= List of ship commissionings in 1999 =

The list of ship commissionings in 1999 includes a chronological list of all ships commissioned in 1999.

	Operator	Ship	Flag	Class and type	Pennant	Other notes
20 March	United States Navy	Porter		Arleigh Burke-class destroyer	DDG-78	
24 April	United States Navy	Higgins		Arleigh Burke-class destroyer	DDG-76	
2 June	Indian Navy	Mysore		Delhi-class destroyer	D60	
5 June	Royal Canadian Navy	Brandon		Kingston-class coastal defence vessel	MM 710	
6 June	French Navy	Aconit		La Fayette-class frigate	F713	
10 July	Royal Australian Navy	Waller		Collins-class submarine	SSG 75	
18 July	Royal Canadian Navy	Summerside		Kingston-class coastal defence vessel	MM 711	
25 September	Royal Navy	Grimsby		Sandown-class minehunter	M108	
23 October	United States Navy	O'Kane		Arleigh Burke-class destroyer	DDG-77	
10 November	Royal Malaysian Navy	Jebat		Lekiu-class frigate	F29	
27 November	Royal Navy	Vengeance		Vanguard-class submarine	S31	
10 December	Royal New Zealand Navy	Te Mana		Anzac-class frigate	F111	
23 December	French Navy	Téméraire		Triomphant-class submarine	S617	
