= KD Lekiu =

Malaysian frigate

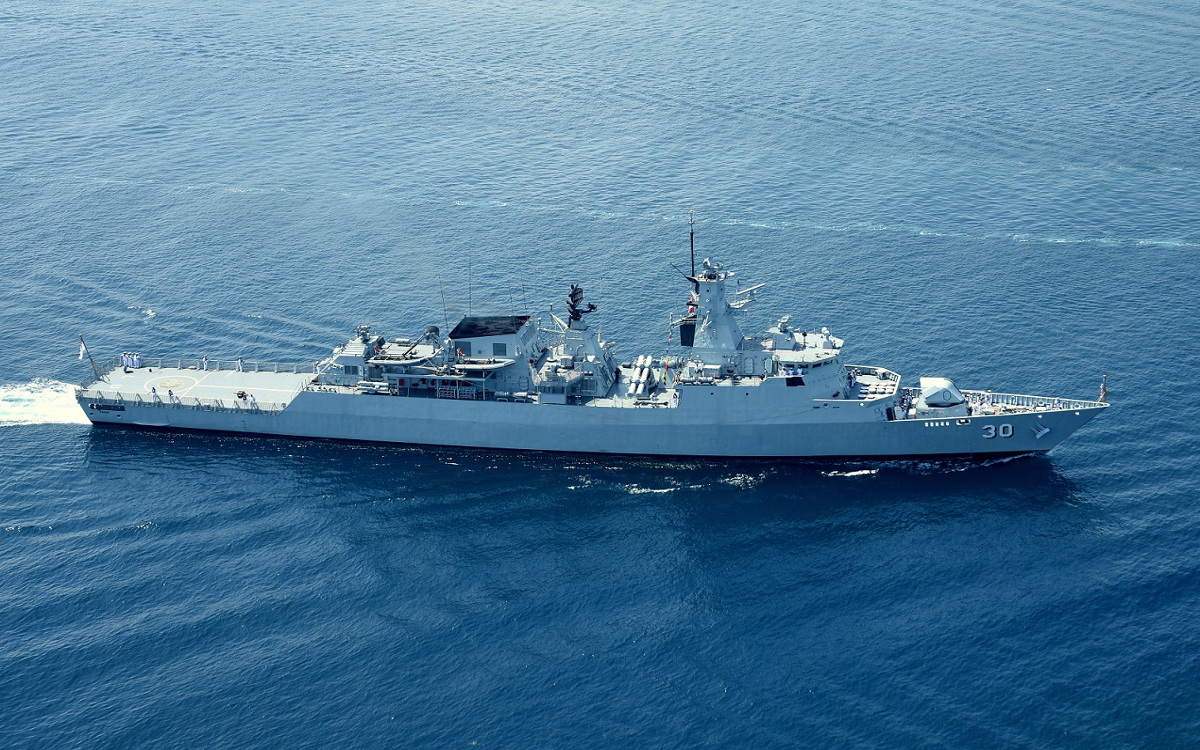
- KD Lekiu (FFG30)

History

Malaysia
- Name: KD Lekiu
- Namesake: Hang Lekiu
- Builder: Yarrow Shipbuilders, Glasgow
- Launched: December 1994
- Commissioned: May 1999
- Status: In active service
- Badge

General characteristics
- Class & type: Lekiu-class frigate
- Displacement: 2,270 long tons (2,306 t) full load
- Length: 106 m (347 ft 9 in)
- Beam: 12.8 m (42 ft 0 in)
- Draught: 3.6 m (11 ft 10 in)
- Propulsion: 4 diesels, 2 shafts, 16,000 bhp (11,931 kW)
- Speed: 28 knots (32 mph; 52 km/h)
- Range: 5,000 mi (8,000 km)
- Complement: 146 with 18 officers
- Sensors & processing systems: Combat system: BAE Systems Insyte Nautis F combat data system; Search radar: Ericsson Sea Giraffe-150 Surface search radar G and H bands, Thales Netherlands (Signaal) DA-08 air search operating at E and F bands; Navigation radar: Thales Defence I-band navigation radar; Fire control radar: 2 × Marconi 1802SW, Alenia Marconi Systems Nautis F combat data system, Radamec Series 2000 Optronic weapon director, BAE SYSTEMS 1802 fire control radars operating at I and J bands; Thermal imager: BAE Type V 3001; Sonar: Thales Underwater Systems Spherion TSM 2633 LF sonar
- Electronic warfare & decoys: ESM: BAE Mentor-A; ECM: Thales Defense Scimitar; Decoy: 2 Super Barricade 12 barrelled launchers, Graseby Sea Siren torpedo decoy
- Armament: Guns: 1 × Bofors 57 mm gun; 2 × MSI DS30B 30 mm cannon; Anti-air: 16 × VLS for Sea Wolf; Anti-ship: 8 × Exocet MM40 Block 2; Anti-submarine: 2 × triple Eurotorp B515 with A244-S ASW torpedoes
- Aircraft carried: 1 × Super Lynx 300 helicopter
- Aviation facilities: Stern hangar; Helicopter landing platform

KD Lekiu (FFG 30) is a Lekiu-class guided missile frigate currently serving in the Royal Malaysian Navy and one of the major naval assets for Malaysia. Together with her sister ship Jebat, Lekiu serves in the 23rd Frigate Squadron of the Royal Malaysian Navy.

== Development ==
The ships were built by Yarrow Shipbuilders of Glasgow (now BAE Systems Surface Ships) of United Kingdom based on the F2000 frigate design. Lekiu was launched in December 1994 and commissioned May 1999. Although the Lekiu was launched before the Jebat, but Jebat carries the lower pennant number (FFG29) compared to Lekiu (FFG30) to signify the seniority of this ship, which accommodates the Admiral of the Royal Malaysian Navy. (Hang Jebat succeeded Hang Tuah as Laksamana (Admiral) of the Malacca Sultanate, while Hang Lekiu was never made a Laksamana.).

== Characteristic ==
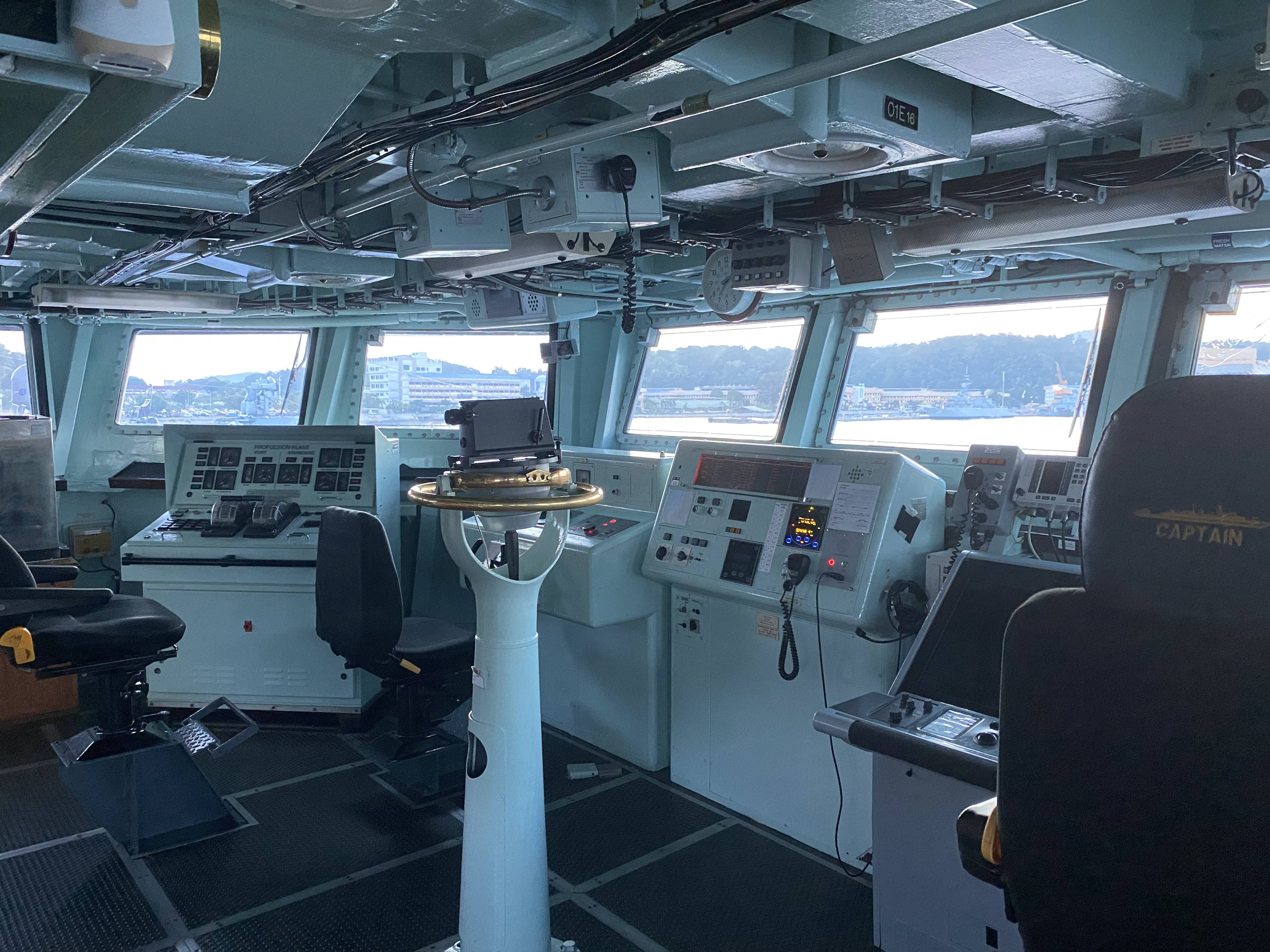
Bridge of KD Lekiu

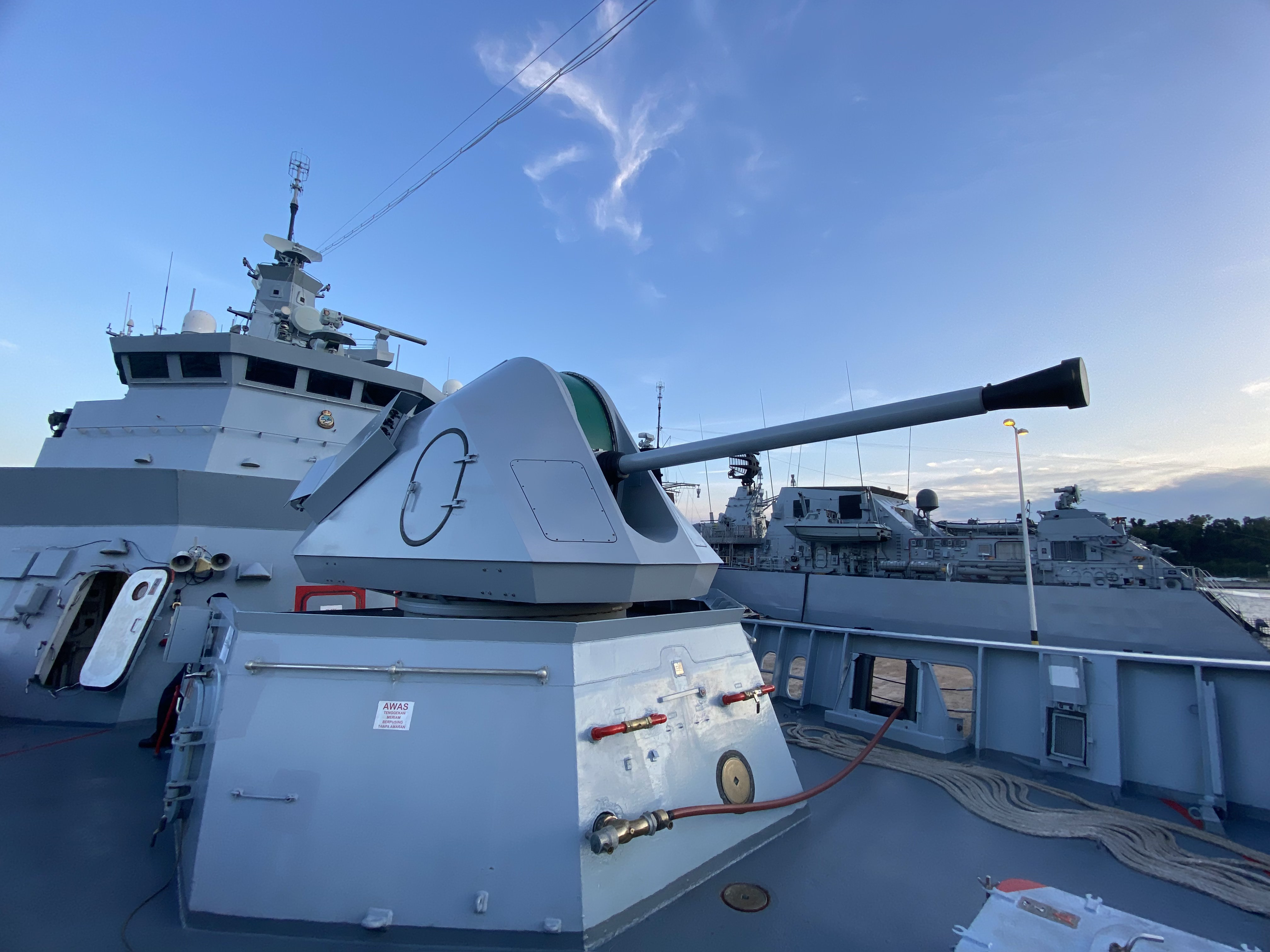
Bofors 57 mm gun on KD Lekiu

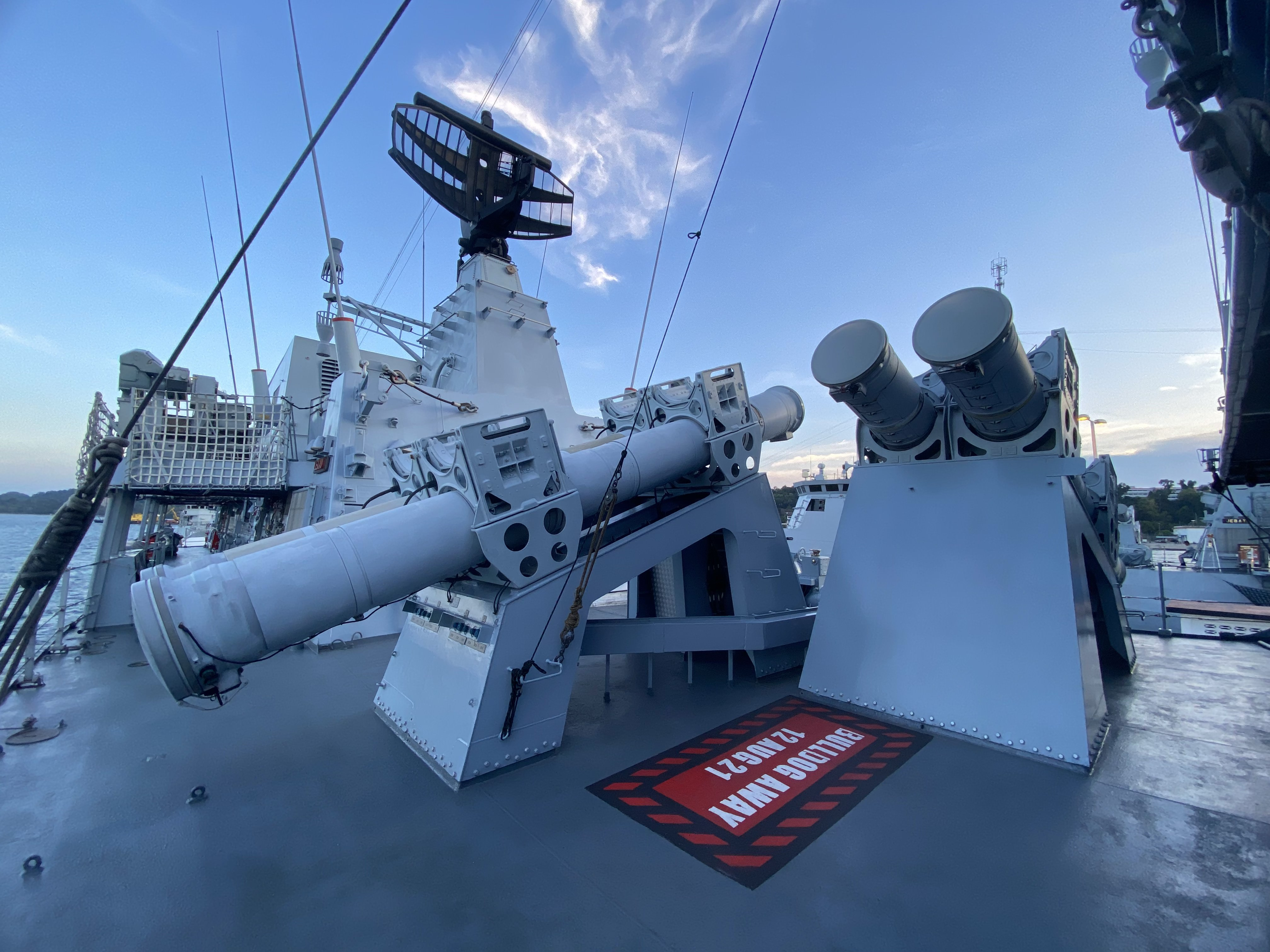
Anti-ship missile system on KD Lekiu equipped with Exocet missiles

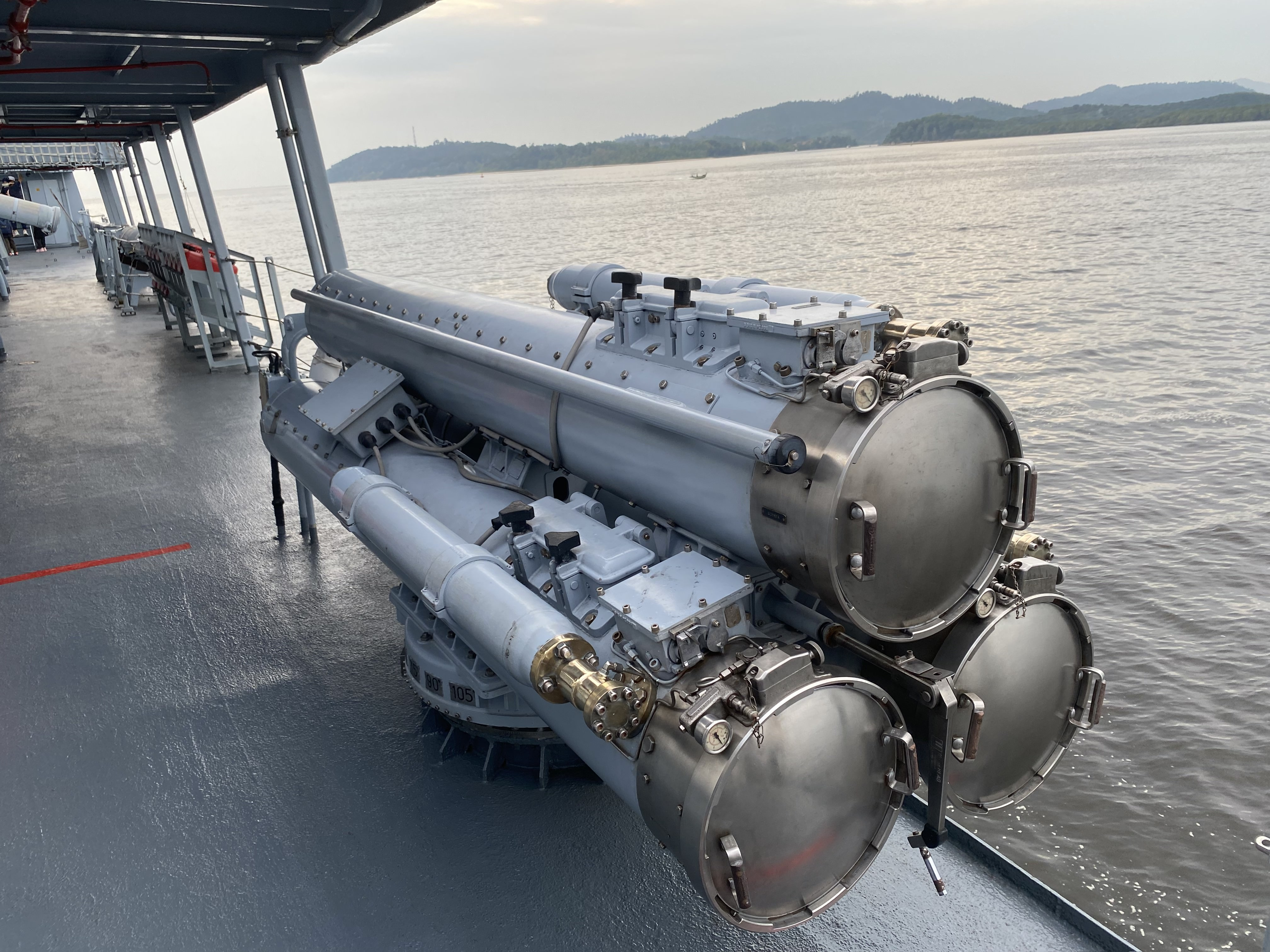
Anti submarine warfare on KD Lekiu equipped with A244-S ASW torpedo

As for the weapon systems, Lekiu equipped with one Bofors 57 mm gun and two MSI DS30M 30 mm cannon. For the missiles, there was 16 Sea Wolf surface-to-air missile for air defence and 8 MM40 Exocet block 2 anti-ship missile for anti surface warfare. Two triple Eurotorp B515 with A244-S ASW torpedoes also installed for anti submarine warfare.
