= Lekiu-class frigate =

Malaysian Navy frigate class

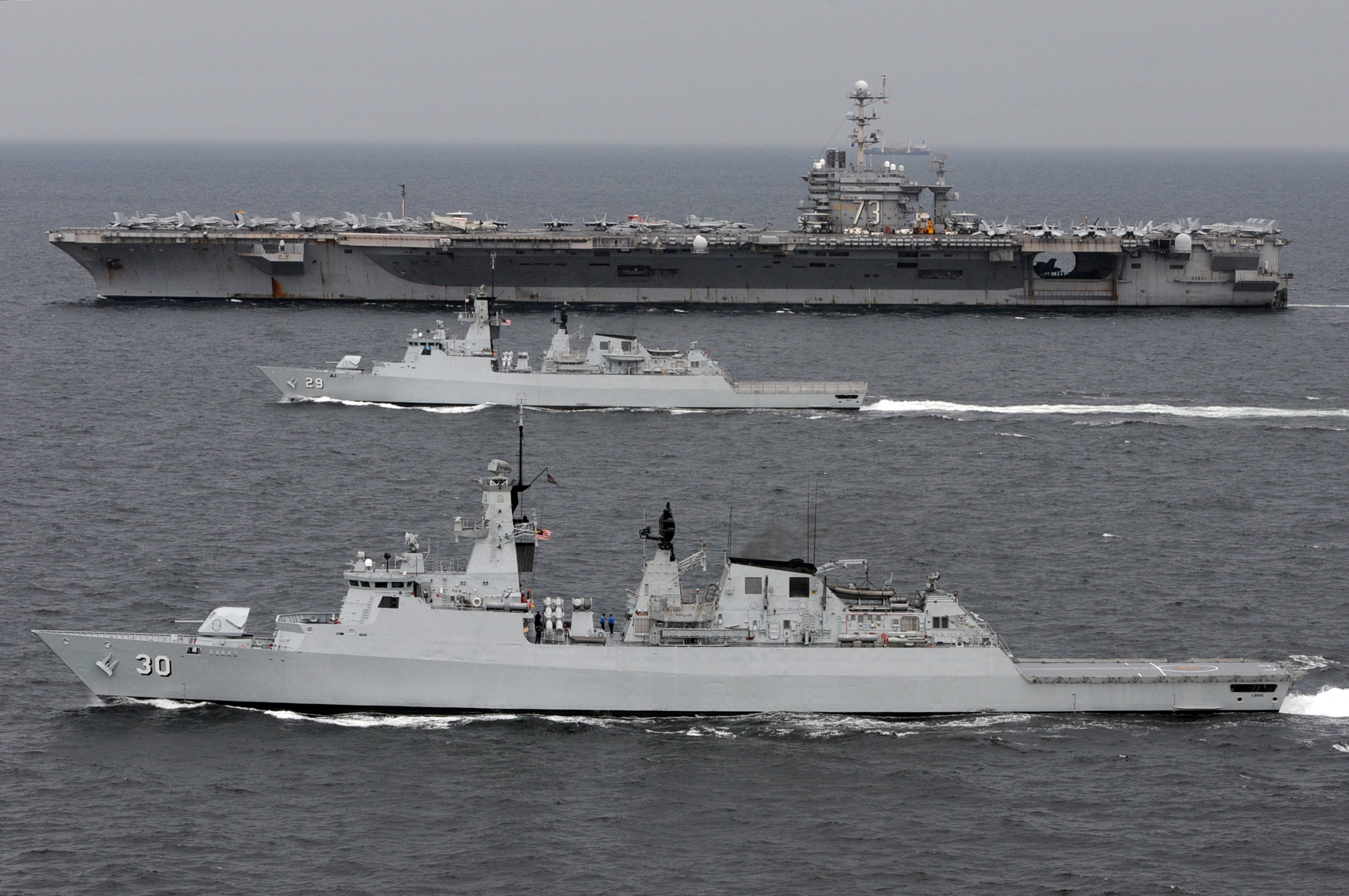
- KD Lekiu (FFG30) and KD Jebat (FFG29) with USS George Washington

Class overview
- Name: Lekiu class
- Builders: Yarrow Shipbuilders, Glasgow, UK
- Operators: Royal Malaysian Navy
- Preceded by: KD Rahmat; KD Hang Tuah (as a frigate)
- Succeeded by: Maharaja Lela class
- Completed: 2
- Active: 2

General characteristics
- Class & type: F2000 frigate
- Displacement: 2,300 tons full load
- Length: 106 m (348 ft)
- Beam: 12.75 m (41.8 ft)
- Draught: 3.08 m (10.1 ft)
- Propulsion: 4 × MTU 20V 1163 TB93 diesel engines, 24.5MW, twin shafts with Kamewa controllable pitch propellers
- Speed: 28 knots (52 km/h; 32 mph)
- Range: 5,000 nmi (9,300 km; 5,800 mi)
- Complement: 146 with 18 officers
- Sensors & processing systems: Combat system: BAE Systems Insyte Nautis F combat data system; Search radar: Ericsson Sea Giraffe-150 surface search radar G and H bands, Thales Netherlands (Signaal) DA-08 air search operating at E and F bands; Navigation radar: Thales Defence I-band navigation radar; Fire control radar: 2 × Marconi 1802SW, Alenia Marconi Systems Nautis F combat data system, Radamec Series 2000 Optronic weapon director, BAE SYSTEMS 1802 fire control radar operating at I and J bands; Thermal imager: BAE Type V 3001; Sonar: Thales Underwater Systems Spherion TSM 2633 LF sonar
- Electronic warfare & decoys: ESM: BAE Mentor-A; ECM: Thales Defense Scimitar; Decoy: 2 Super Barricade 12 barrelled launchers, Graseby Sea Siren torpedo decoy
- Armament: Guns: 1 × Bofors 57 mm gun; 2 × MSI DS30B 30 mm cannon; Anti-air: 16 × VLS for Sea Wolf; Anti-ship: 8 × Exocet MM40 Block 2; Anti-submarine: 2 × triple Eurotorp B515 with A244-S ASW torpedoes
- Aircraft carried: 1 × Super Lynx 300
- Aviation facilities: Stern hangar; Helicopter landing platform

The Lekiu-class frigates are a class of frigates of the Royal Malaysian Navy. They are the largest and most modern surface combatants of the Royal Malaysian Navy, until the Maharaja Lela-class frigates are completed. The class comprises two vessels, KD Jebat and KD Lekiu. The class is named after the second ship of the class which was launched before Jebat.

The two ships of the class are named after Hang Lekiu and Hang Jebat, two figures from the Malay 15th-century epic narrative Hikayat Hang Tuah. They share this characteristic with the two Kasturi-class corvettes, KD Kasturi and KD Lekir, as well as the old frigate-turned-training ship KD Hang Tuah, all of which are named after figures from the epic as well.

== Development ==
The ships were built in the United Kingdom by Yarrow Shipbuilders of Glasgow (now BAE Systems Surface Ships) from the company's standard F2000 frigate design. Lekiu was launched in December 1994 while the Jebat was launched in May 1995. Jebat carries the lower pennant number (FFG29) to signify the seniority of this ship, which accommodates the Admiral of the Royal Malaysian Navy. (Hang Jebat succeeded Hang Tuah as Laksamana (Admiral) during the Melaka Sultanate, while Hang Lekiu was never made a Laksamana.)

The purchase of the two ships of the Lekiu class involved a major transfer of technology programme and an offset programme where some portion of the contract value would involve purchases and services contracted to Malaysian companies.

Delivery and operational status were delayed due to integration of combat systems problems. The ships were commissioned in March and May 1999. The ships represented a huge jump in capability compared to the frigates then operated by the Royal Malaysian Navy, KD Rahmat and KD Hang Tuah (ex-HMS Mermaid).

Both Jebat and Lekiu serve in the 23 Frigate Squadron of the Royal Malaysian Navy.

== Delays ==
The Lekiu class faced serious delays due to difficulties in the systems integration of the weapons and weapons control system (i.e., software problems). These problems were overcome and the delivery and commissioning of the two ships was completed on 7 October and 10 November 1999.

== Plans for further ships ==
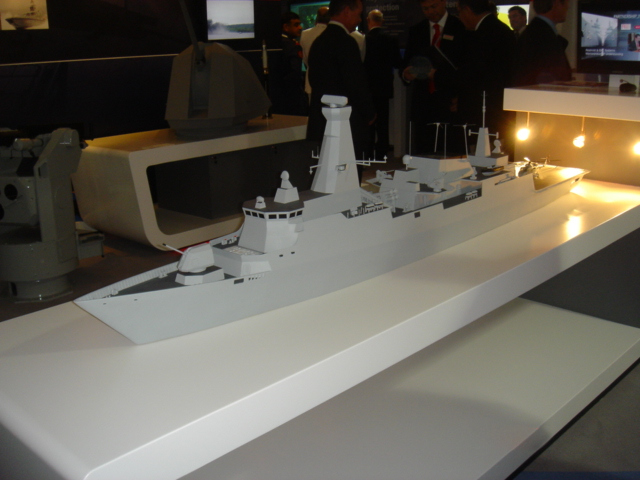
The model of Lekiu batch 2 displayed at LIMA 2007.

Malaysian Minister of Defence Najib Tun Razak announced at the 2006 Farnborough Air Show that Malaysia would be buying two frigates from the United Kingdom under Project Brave. The Evening Times reported on 20 July 2006 that the Clyde shipyard has won a contract to build two Lekiu class-frigates for Malaysia.

The two ships were to have been completed at Labuan Shipyard and Engineering as a condition of the deal but were cancelled in August 2009. In 2013, Malaysia announced the purchasing of Maharaja Lela-class frigates and the Lekiu class batch 2 is presumed to be cancelled.

== Service Life Extension Program (SLEP) ==
A limited service life extension program started in 2015. Upgrades include Thales Vigile 100 Mk2 ESM replacing the BAE Mentor A, Chess Dynamics Sea Eagle FCEO replacing the BAE Type V 3001 and Terma Scanter 6000 navigation radar.

In January 2025, it is confirmed that Malaysia planned to upgrade Lekiu class with Naval Strike Missile as its new anti-ship missile. In March 2026, the Norwegian government banned the export of the NSM to Malaysia a few days before a scheduled delivery. The ban was announced to the public in May, after which Prime Minister Anwar Ibrahim expressed Malaysia's "objection" to his Norwegian counterpart Jonas Gahr Støre. On the same day, a special committee was set up by Defence Minister Mohamed Khaled Nordin to oversee legal action and compensation claims against Norway.

== Major operation ==
KD Lekiu together with KD Sri Inderapura involved in Ops Fajar 4 mission/Anti-piracy measures in Somalia by Royal Malaysian navy in Gulf of Aden in 2008. Both ships were tasked to return two hijacked Malaysian International Shipping Corporation (MISC) shipping vessels MT Bunga Melati Dua and MT Bunga Melati Lima to Malaysia.

In 2013 KD Jebat was involved in a naval blockade in 2013 Lahad Datu standoff.

In 2014, KD Lekiu involved in MH370's Search and Rescue Operation in the South Indian Ocean for several months.

In 2018, KD Lekiu participated in the world's largest maritime exercise RIMPAC.

== Ships of the class ==
Pennant	Name	Builders	Launched	Commissioned	Division/Squadron	Notes
FFG29	KD Jebat	Yarrow Shipbuilders	May 1995	March 1999	23rd Frigate Squadron	
FFG30	KD Lekiu	Yarrow Shipbuilders	December 1994	May 1999	23rd Frigate Squadron	

== Gallery ==
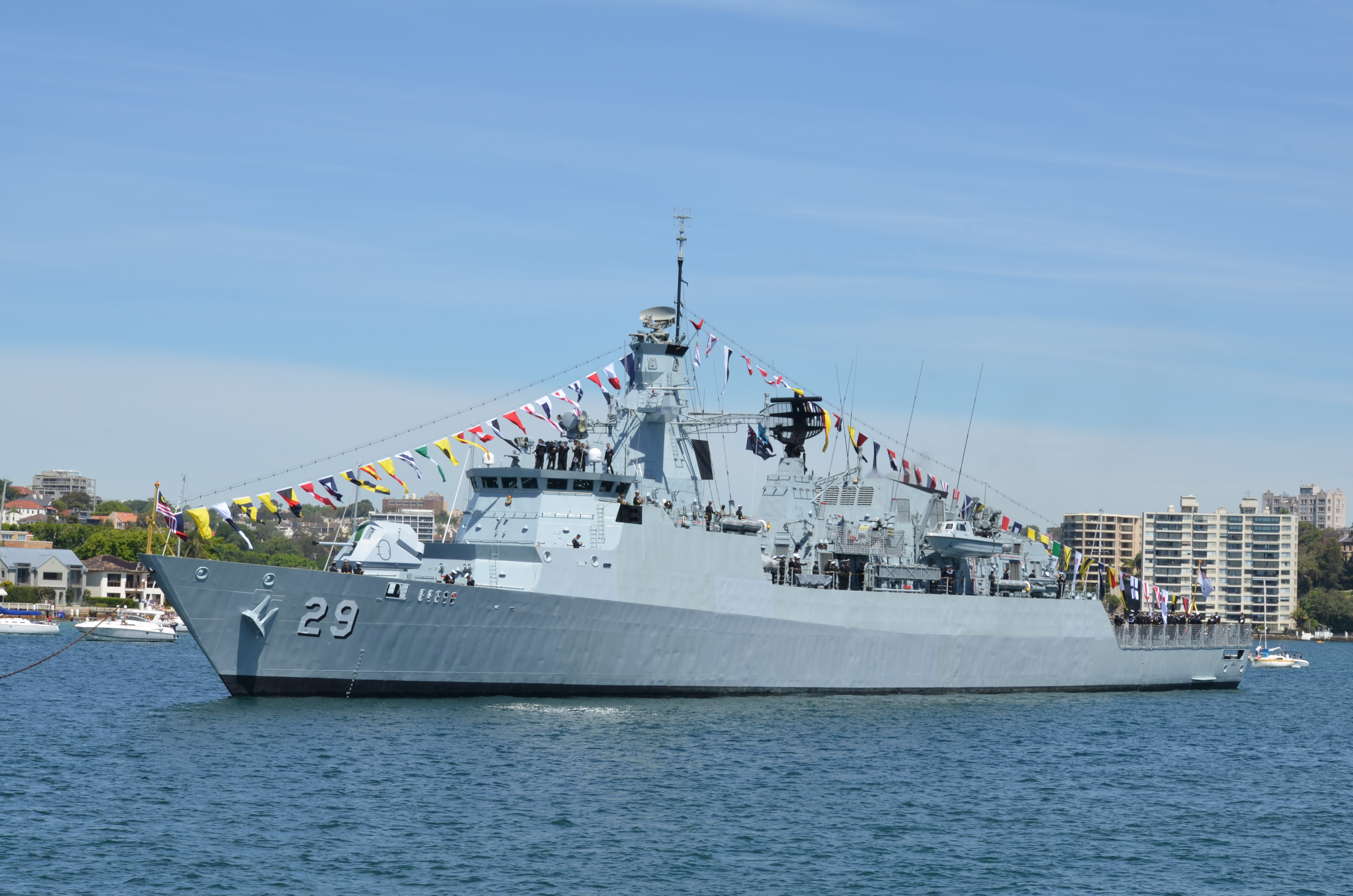
KD Jebat moored in Sydney Harbour in October 2013.

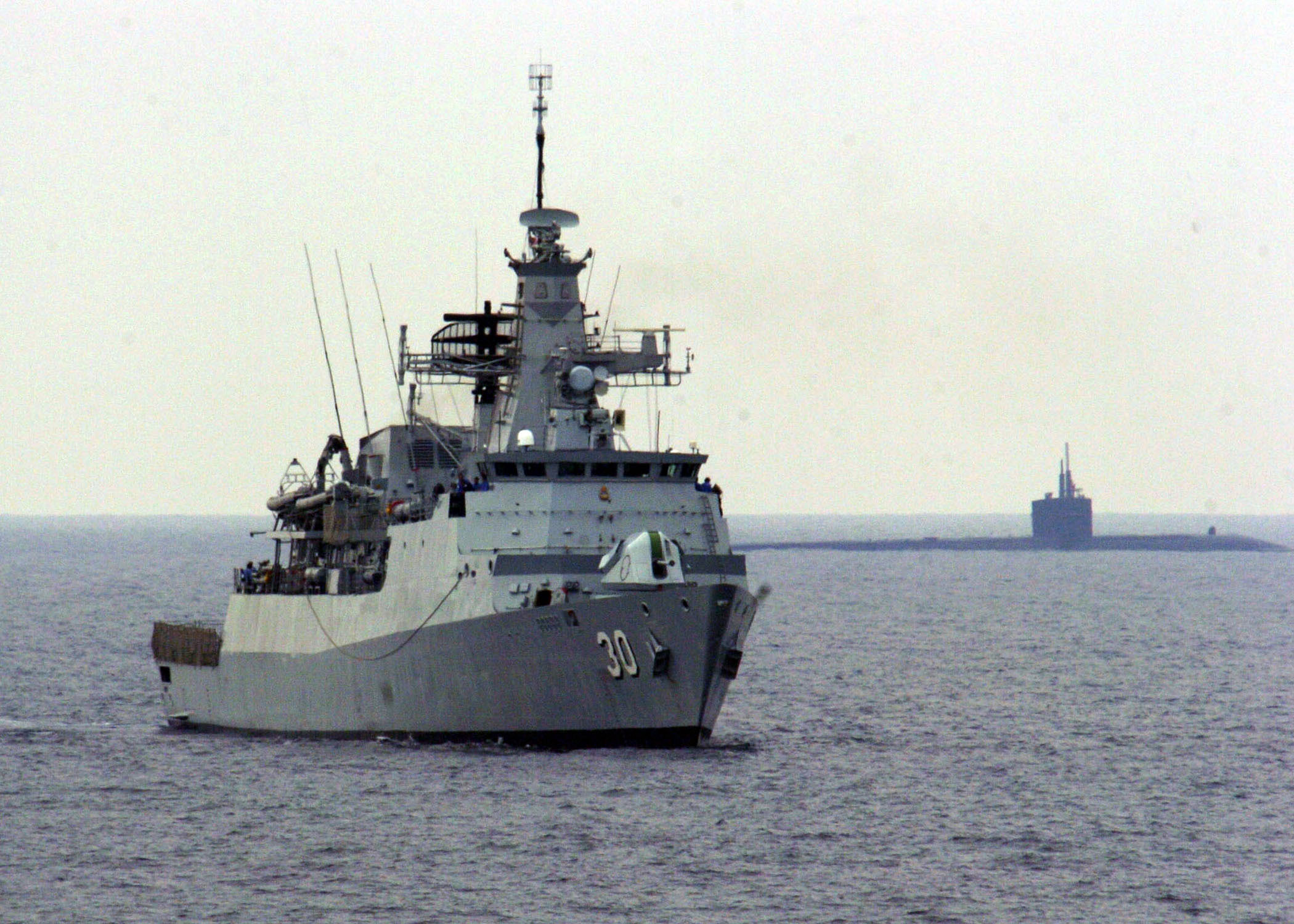
KD Lekiu passes by the US Navy submarine USS La Jolla during a submarine warfare exercise at CARAT 2011.

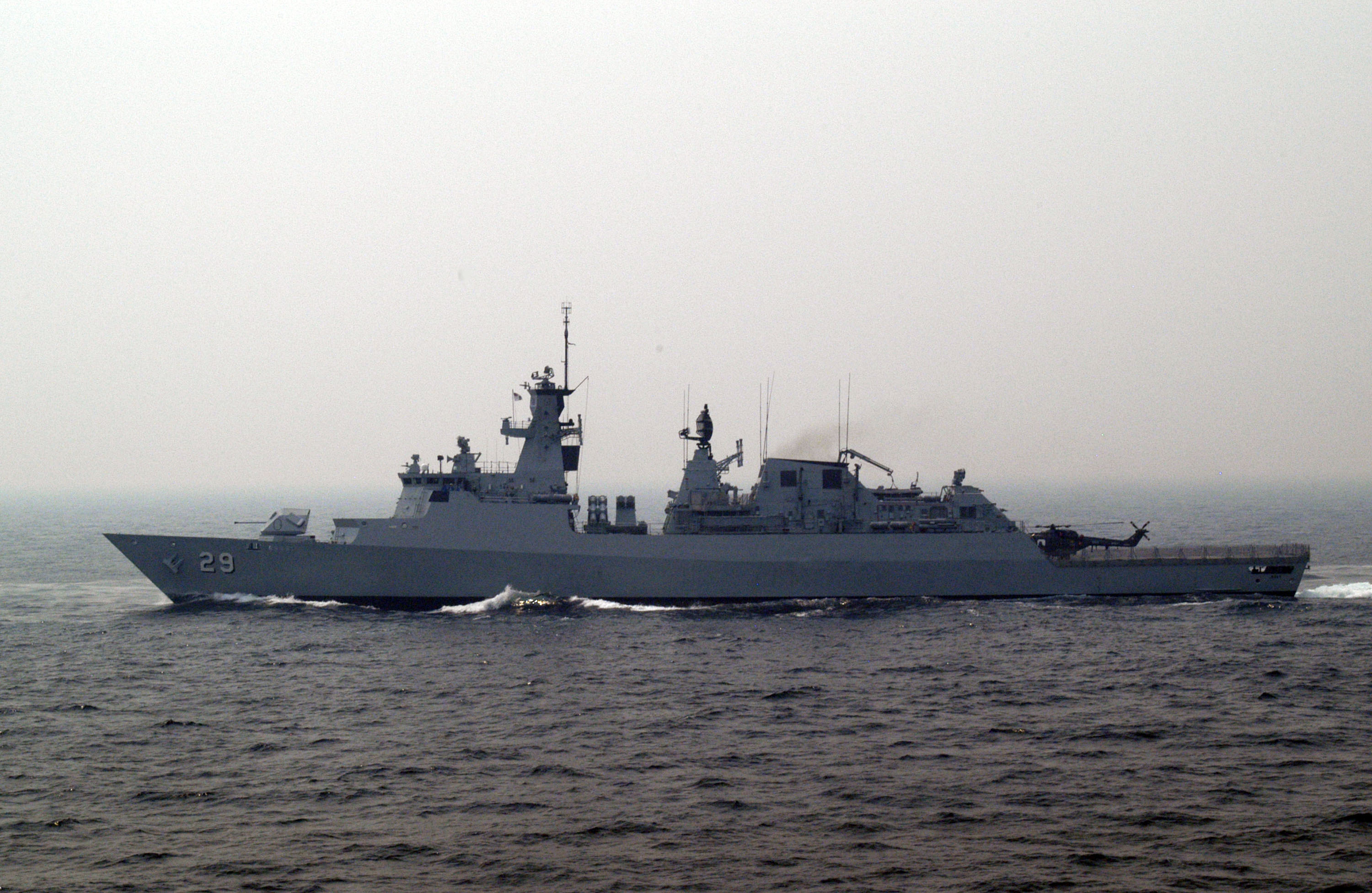
KD Jebat underway off the coast of Malaysia during a divisional tactics drill as part of Cooperation Afloat Readiness and Training (CARAT) Malaysia 2013.

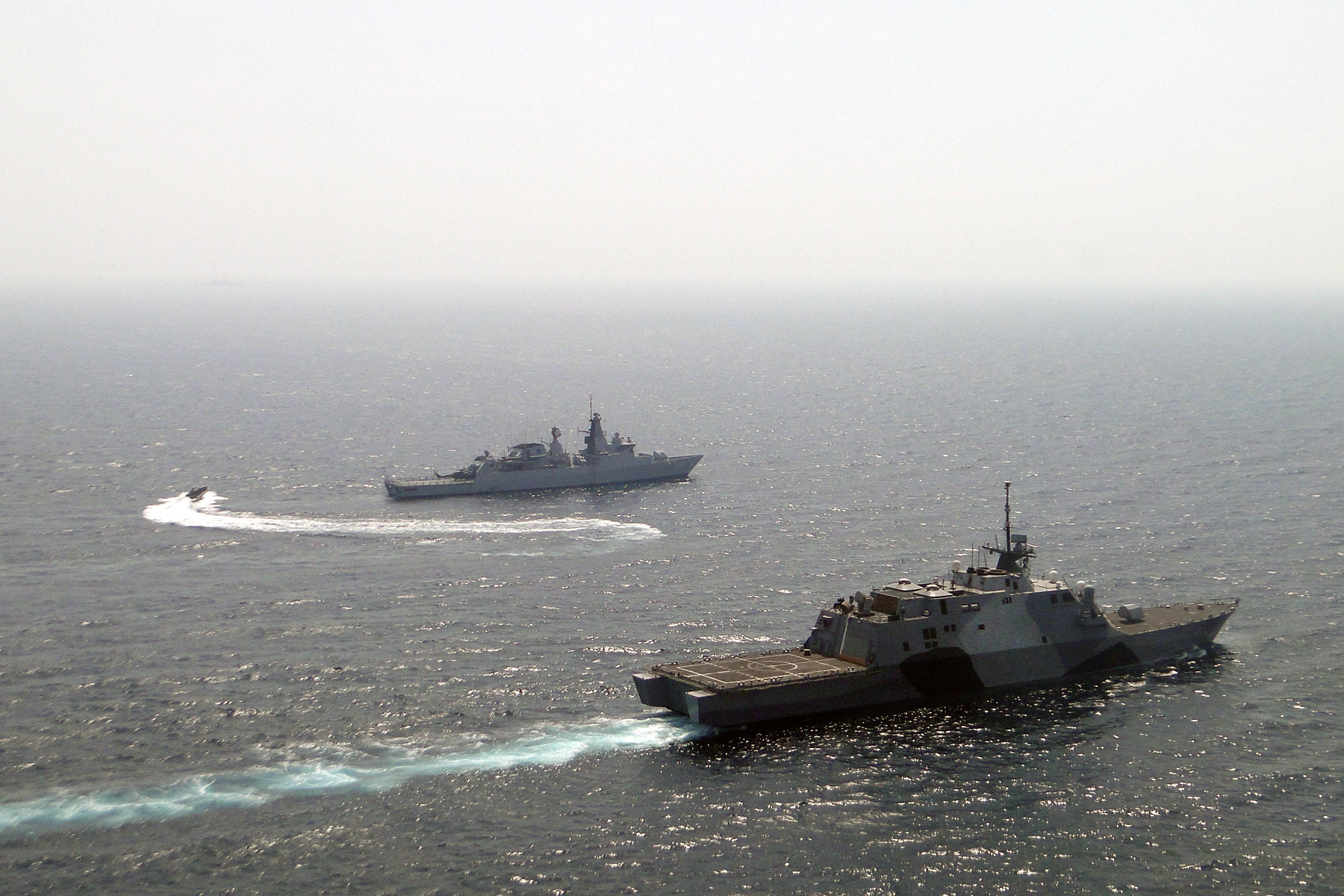
A rigid-hull inflatable boat from the LCS USS Freedom takes a visit, board, search and seizure team to the Malaysian frigate KD Jebat during a compliant boarding exercise.

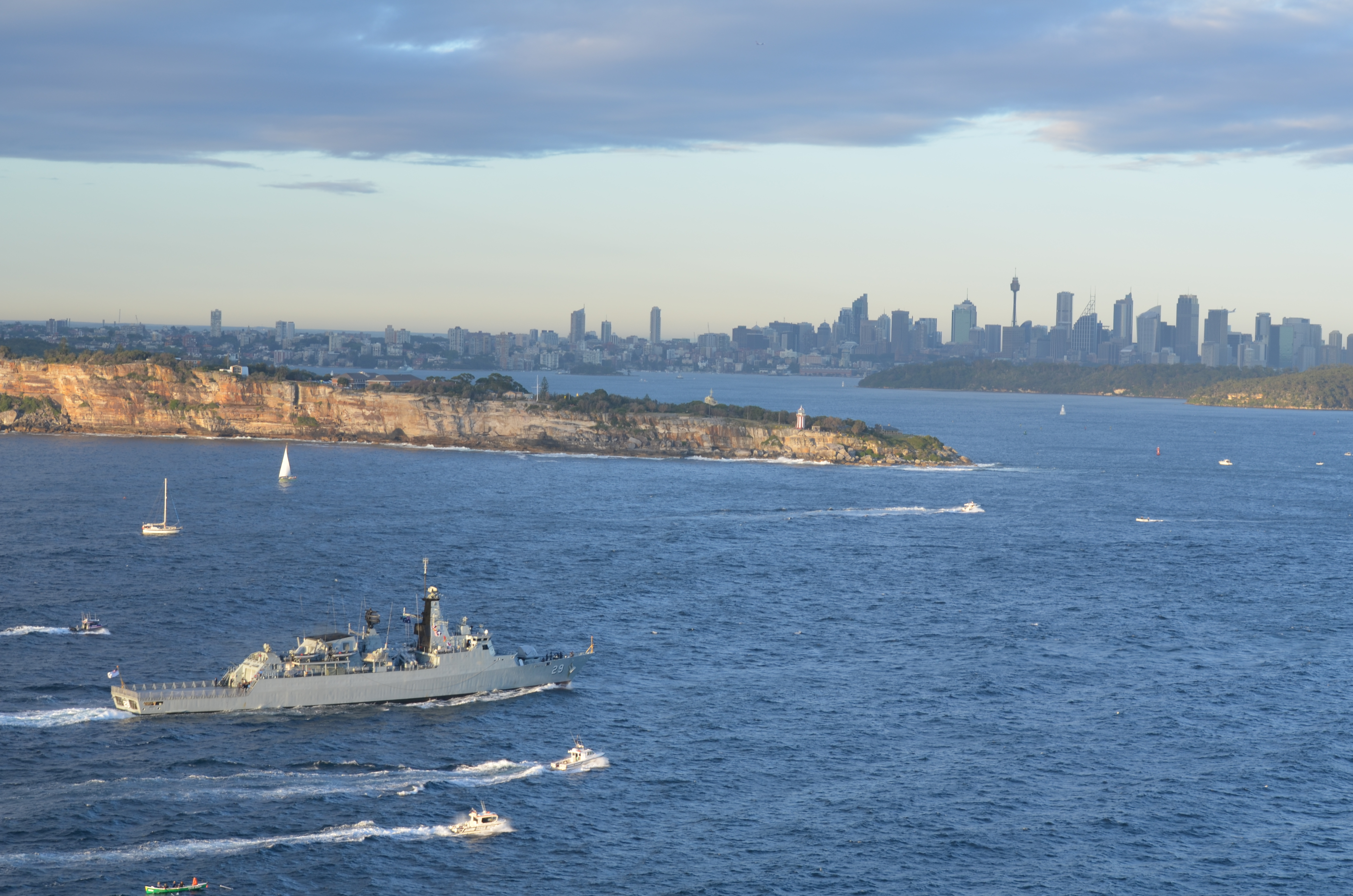
KD Jebat entering Sydney harbour for the Sydney International Fleet Review 2013.

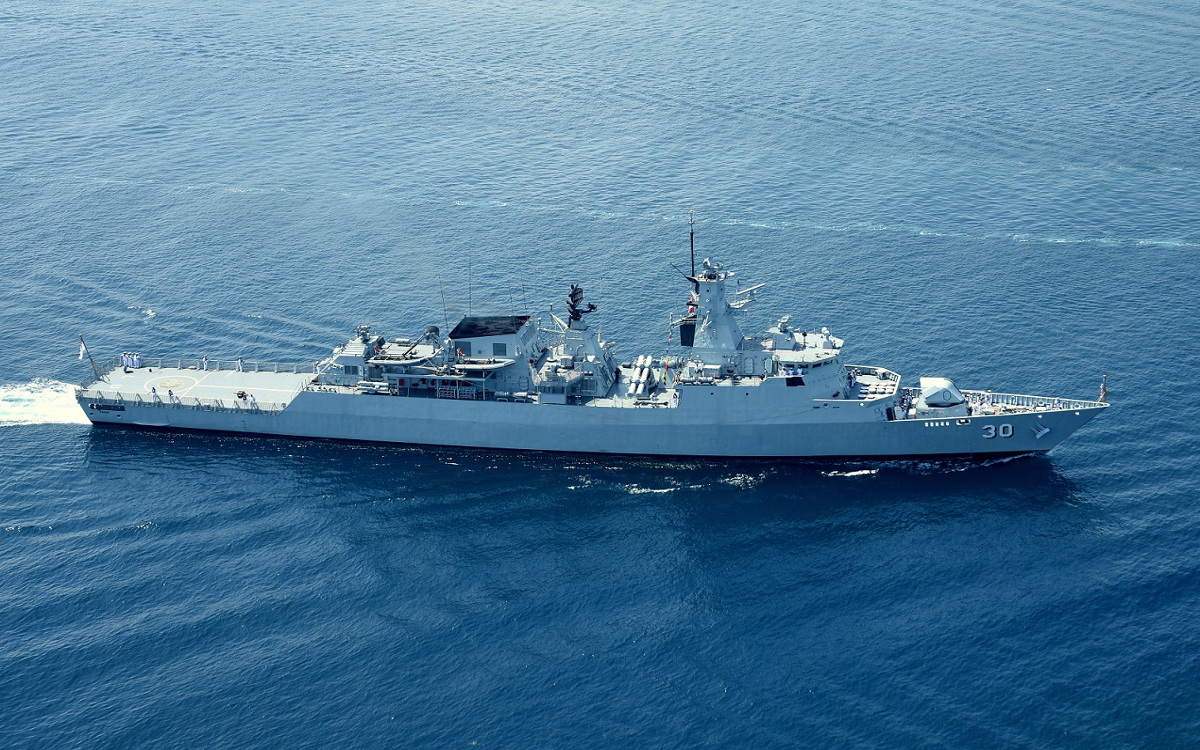
KD Lekiu during Milan 2018 exercise hosted by Indian Navy.

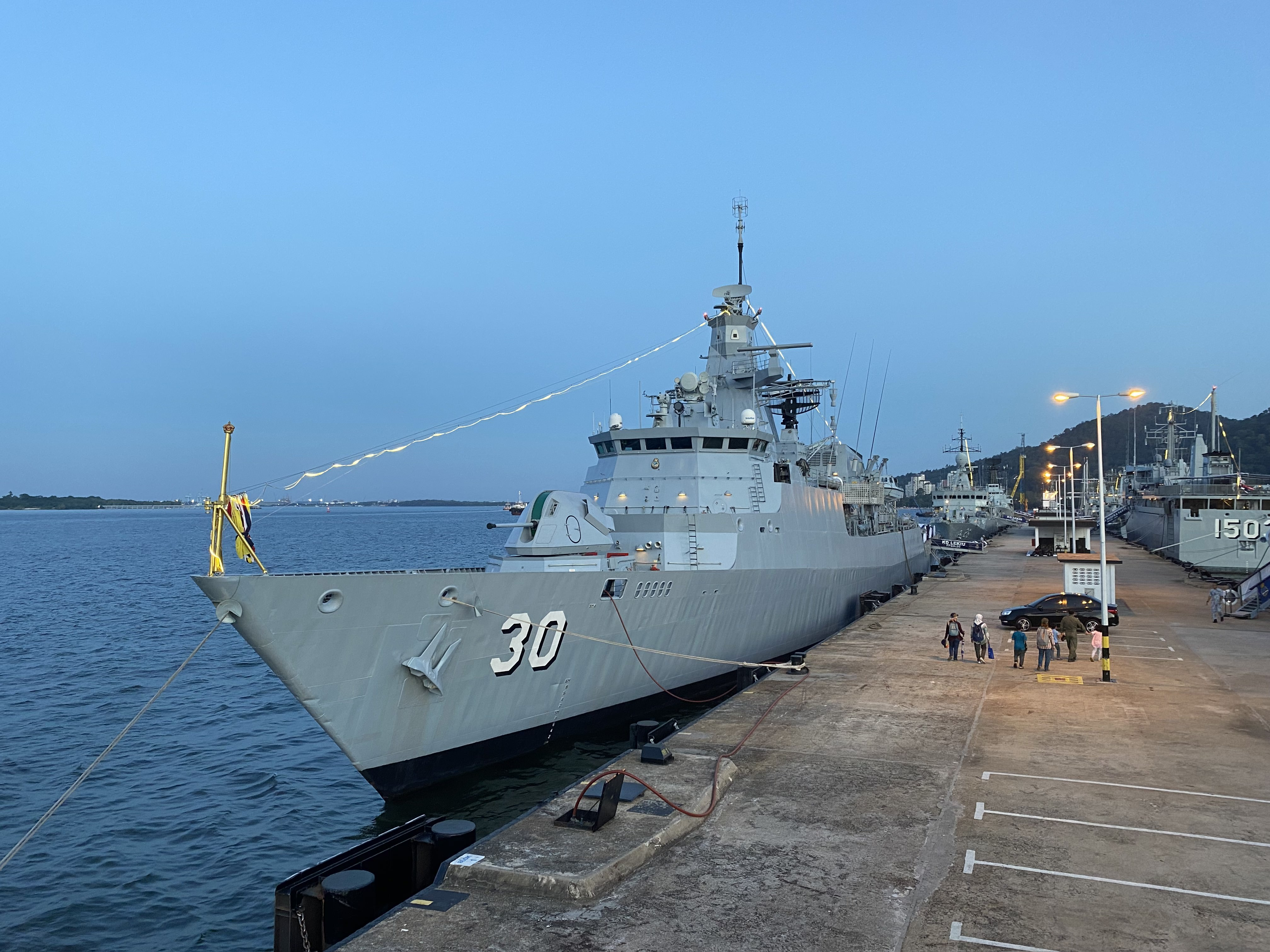
KD Lekiu docked at RMN Lumut Naval Base at night.

== See also ==
- Nakhoda Ragam-class corvette – Three other F2000-derived ships ordered for the Royal Brunei Navy but purchased by the Indonesian Navy.
- List of frigate classes in service

Equivalent frigates of the same era

- Hydra class
- Type 053H3
- Brahmaputra class
- Barbaros class
- La Fayette class
