= KD Jebat =

Malaysian guided missile frigate

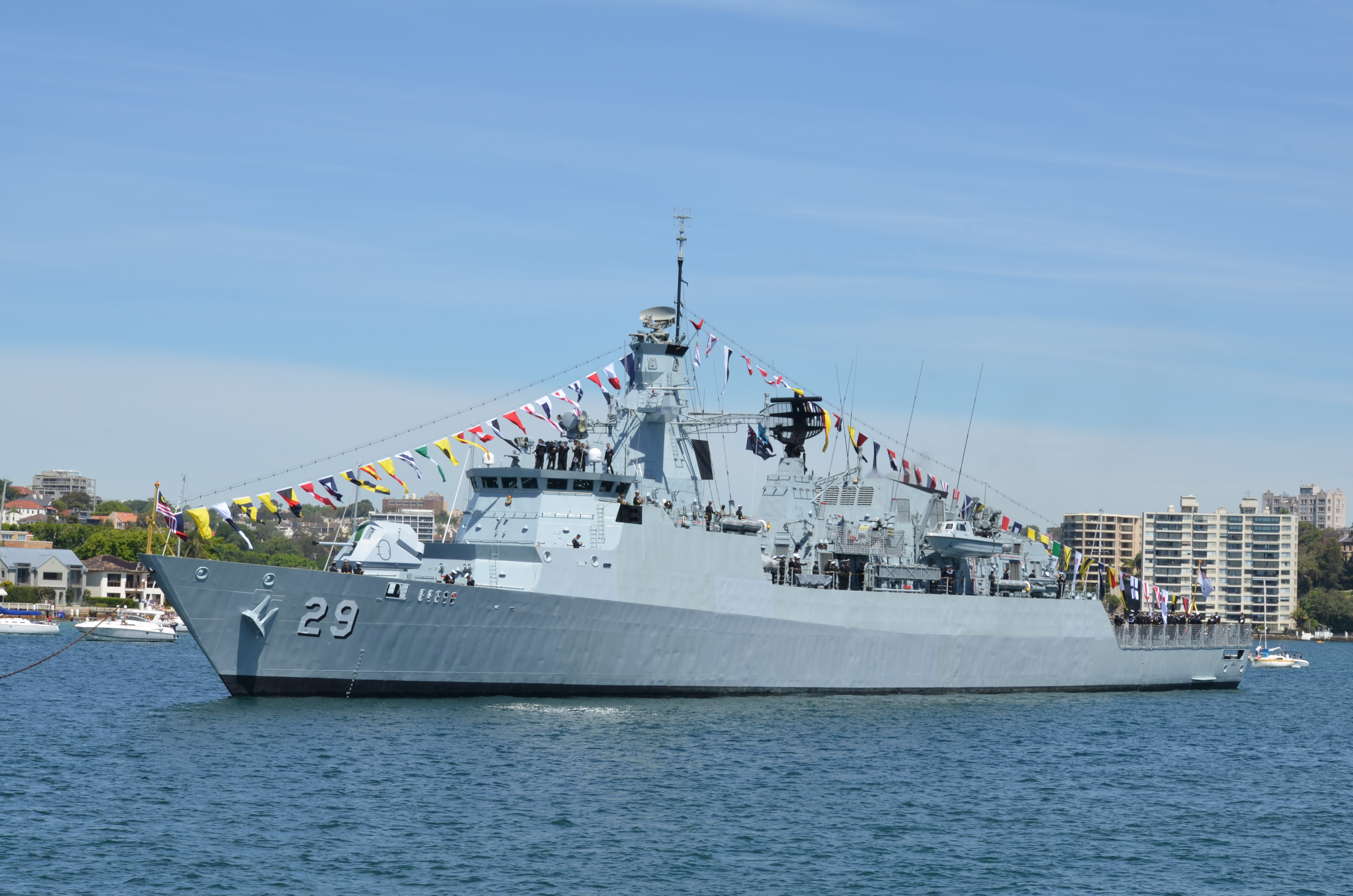
- KD Jebat (FFG29) moored in Sydney Harbour in October 2013

History

Malaysia
- Name: KD Jebat
- Namesake: Hang Jebat
- Builder: Yarrow Shipbuilders, Glasgow
- Launched: 27 May 1995
- Commissioned: 10 November 1999
- Identification: MMSI number: 535198000; Callsign: 9MOF; Hull number: 29
- Status: In active service
- Badge

General characteristics
- Class & type: Lekiu-class frigate
- Displacement: 2,270 long tons (2,306 t) full load
- Length: 106 m (347 ft 9 in)
- Beam: 12.8 m (42 ft 0 in)
- Draught: 3.6 m (11 ft 10 in)
- Propulsion: 4 diesels, 2 shafts, 16,000 bhp (11,931 kW)
- Speed: 28 knots (32 mph; 52 km/h)
- Range: 5,000 mi (8,000 km)
- Complement: 146 with 18 officers
- Sensors & processing systems: Combat system: BAE Systems Insyte Nautis F combat data system; Search radar: Ericsson Sea Giraffe-150 Surface search radar G and H bands, Thales Netherlands (Signaal) DA-08 air search operating at E and F bands; Navigation radar: Thales Defence I-band navigation radar; Fire control radar: 2 × Marconi 1802SW, Alenia Marconi Systems Nautis F combat data system, Radamec Series 2000 Optronic weapon director, BAE SYSTEMS 1802 fire control radars operating at I and J bands; Thermal imager: BAE Type V 3001; Sonar: Thales Underwater Systems Spherion TSM 2633 LF sonar
- Electronic warfare & decoys: ESM: BAE Mentor-A; ECM: Thales Defense Scimitar; Decoy: 2 Super Barricade 12 barrelled launchers, Graseby Sea Siren torpedo decoy
- Armament: Guns: 1 × Bofors 57 mm gun; 2 × MSI DS30B 30 mm cannon; Anti-air: 16 × VLS for Sea Wolf; Anti-ship: 8 × Exocet MM40 Block 2; Anti-submarine: 2 × triple Eurotorp B515 with A244-S ASW torpedoes
- Aircraft carried: 1 × Super Lynx 300 helicopter
- Aviation facilities: Stern hangar; Helicopter landing platform

KD Jebat (FFG 29) is a Lekiu-class guided missile frigate currently serving in the Royal Malaysian Navy and one of the major naval assets for Malaysia. Jebat serves in the 23rd Frigate Squadron of the Royal Malaysian Navy.

== Development ==
The ship's class, built by Yarrow Shipbuilders (now BAE Systems Surface Fleet Solutions) in Glasgow, United Kingdom, is based on the F2000 frigate design. Jebat was launched in May 1995 and commissioned in May 1999. Jebat carries the lower pennant number (FFG29) to signify the seniority of this ship, which accommodates the Admiral of the Royal Malaysian Navy. (Hang Jebat succeeded Hang Tuah as Laksamana (Admiral) of the Malacca Sultanate, while Hang Lekiu was never made a Laksamana.)

The ship was a huge jump in capability compared to the frigates then operated by the Royal Malaysian Navy, KD Rahmat (F24) and KD Hang Tuah (F76) (ex-HMS Mermaid). Nevertheless, the delivery and operational status of Jebat were delayed due to integration of combat systems problems. The purchase of this ship also involved a major Transfer of Technology (ToT) program as well as an offset program where some portion of the contract value would involve purchases and services contracted to Malaysian companies.

== Characteristics ==
As for the weapon systems, Jebat equipped with one Bofors 57 mm gun and two MSI DS30M 30 mm cannon. For the missiles, there was 16 Sea Wolf surface-to-air missile for air defence and 8 MM40 Exocet block 2 anti-ship missile for anti surface warfare (to get NSM SSM see note). Two triple Eurotorp B515 with A244-S ASW torpedoes were also installed for anti submarine warfare.
