= KD Rahmat =

Frigate operated by the Royal Malaysian Navy

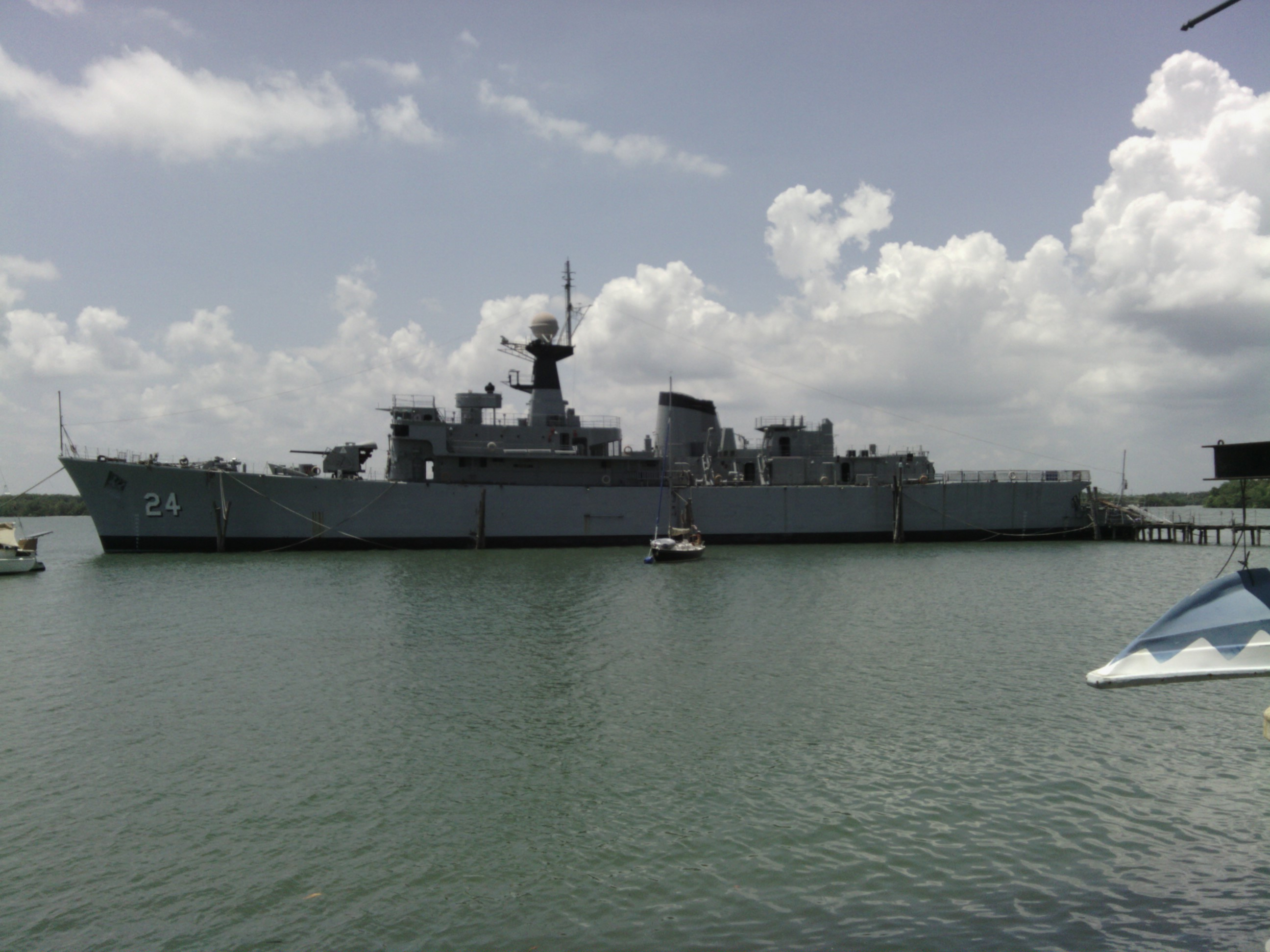
- KD Rahmat as a museum ship

History

Malaysia
- Name: KD Rahmat
- Operator: Royal Malaysian Navy
- Builder: Yarrow Shipbuilders, Glasgow
- Laid down: February 1966
- Launched: 18 December 1967
- Commissioned: 13 September 1971
- Decommissioned: 2004
- Identification: F24
- Fate: Scrapped in 2017
- Notes: Museum ship (2011-2017)
- Badge

General characteristics
- Type: Frigate
- Displacement: 1,250 long tons (1,270 t) standard, 1,600 long tons (1,600 t) full load
- Length: 93.9 m (308 ft) oa, 91.44 m (300.0 ft) pp
- Beam: 10.4 m (34 ft)
- Draught: 4.5 m (15 ft)
- Propulsion: 2 shaft CODOG; 1 Rolls-Royce Olympus gas turbine 19,500 shp (14,500 kW); 1 Crossley Pielstick diesel 3,850 hp (2,870 kW)
- Speed: 26 kn (48 km/h) gas turbines; 16 kn (30 km/h) diesel only
- Range: 6,000 nmi (11,000 km) at 16 kn (30 km/h); 1,000 nmi (1,900 km) at 26 kn (48 km/h)
- Crew: 140
- Sensors & processing systems: Radar - HSA LW 02 air search radar, Signaal M20 gun fire control, M-44 missile fire control; Sonar Type 170B, 174
- Armament: 1 × Mark 5* Mod 1 4.5-inch (113mm) gun; 2 × 40 mm Bofors gun; 1 × 4 Sea Cat SAM (later replaced with 40 mm AA guns); 1 Limbo anti submarine mortar
- Aviation facilities: Helicopter landing platform

KD (Kapal Diraja = Royal Ship) Rahmat (pennant number F24) was a frigate operated by the Royal Malaysian Navy. The ship was ordered in 1966 as Hang Jebat.

== Development ==
The design emphasised simplicity and economy but had an unusual machinery layout with a gas turbine and a diesel driving two propellers via a gearbox in a CODOG (Combined Diesel or Gas) arrangement.

The ship's design served as the basis for HTMS Makut Rajakumarn built for the Thai Navy by Yarrows. KD Rahmat was also the first ship in the region to be fitted with surface-to-air missile system. The Sea Cat surface-to-air missile system was removed during a 1982 refit and was replaced by an additional 40 mm (1.6 in) Bofors gun.

Originally configured as an anti-submarine warfare (ASW) frigate, the ship was also used as the navy's second training platform for commissioned officers and men after routine refit in 2000. To enhance its role as a training vessel and to provide more accommodation space for trainees, its weapons and sonar systems were removed during the refit. The ship was decommissioned in 2004 and handed over to the Perak government in 2008.

== Fate ==
Rahmat was converted into a museum ship in Lumut in 2011. In June 2017, the ship developed a leak and started listing to port. The ship was floated back into position within a few days. In February 2018, the ship sprang another leak and listed to starboard. This time, the ship was deemed irrecoverable and scrapped by Oberjaya Engineering.

== Sources ==
- Baker, A.D. The Naval Institute Guide to Combat Fleets of the World 1998–1999. Annapolis, Maryland: Naval Institute Press, 1998. ISBN 1-55750-111-4.
- Gardiner, Robert and Stephen Chumbley. Conway's All The World's Fighting Ships 1947–1995. Annapolis, Maryland USA: Naval Institute Press, 1995. ISBN 1-55750-132-7.
- Moore, John. Jane's Fighting Ships 1979–80. London: Jane's Yearbooks, 1979. ISBN 0 354 00587 1.
