= Royal Malaysian Navy =

Naval warfare branch of Malaysia's military

- Tentera Laut Diraja Malaysia تنترا لاءوت دراج مليسيا
- Crest of the Royal Malaysian Navy
- Founded: 27 April 1934; 92 years ago
- Country: Malaysia
- Type: Navy
- Role: Naval warfare
- Size: 18,000 personnel; 2 Submarines; 2 Frigates + (5 u/c); 4 Corvettes + (3 u/c); 10 Offshore patrol vessels; 18 Fast attack craft; 43 Fast interceptor craft; 4 Minesweepers; 1 Diving support vessel (u/c); 2 Multi-role support ships; 2 Auxiliary ships; 3 Training ship; 1 Submarine rescue ship; 5 Hydrographic survey vessels; 11 Helicopters; 18 Unmanned aerial vehicles
- Part of: Malaysian Armed Forces
- Garrison/HQ: RMN Lumut Naval Base, Lumut, Perak
- Nickname: TLDM (Tentera Laut Diraja Malaysia)
- Patron: HM The King of Malaysia
- Mottos: Sedia Berkorban (Ready to Sacrifice)
- March: Samudera Raya (Great Ocean)
- Anniversaries: 27 April
- Engagements: World War II; Malayan Emergency; Sarawak Communist Insurgency; Indonesia–Malaysia Confrontation; Communist Insurgency in Malaysia; UNIMOG; 2004 Indian Ocean Earthquake; 2006 East Timorese Crisis; Operation Astute; MALCON-UNIFIL; ISAF; War on terrorism; Operation Enduring Freedom – Horn of Africa; Operation Dawn 8: Gulf of Aden; Cross Border Attacks in Sabah; 2013 Lahad Datu Standoff; MT Orkim Harmony Hijacking
- Battle honours: Perang Dunia Kedua 1941-45; Darurat 1948-60; Konfrontasi 1963-65; Daulat Feb 2013
- Website: navy.mil.my

Commanders
- Captain-in-Chief: HRH Sultan Sharafuddin Idris Shah of Selangor
- Chief of Navy: Admiral Tan Sri Zulhelmy Ithnain
- Deputy Chief of Navy: Vice Admiral Datuk Badarudin Taha

Insignia
- Commissioning pennant

- Ensign

- Jack

- Roundel

The Royal Malaysian Navy (RMN, Malay: Tentera Laut Diraja Malaysia; TLDM; Jawi: تنترا لاءوت دراج مليسيا) is the naval arm of the Malaysian Armed Forces. RMN is the main agency responsible for the country's maritime surveillance and defence operations. RMN's area of operation consists of 603,210 square kilometers covering the country's coastal areas and Exclusive Economic Zones (EEZ). RMN also bears the responsibility of controlling the country's main Sea Lines of Communications (SLOC) such as the Straits of Malacca and the Straits of Singapore and also monitors national interests in areas with overlapping claims such as in Spratly.

== History ==
=== Straits Settlement Royal Naval Volunteer Reserve ===
The Royal Malaysian Navy can trace its roots to the formation of the Straits Settlement Royal Naval Volunteer Reserve (SSRNVR) in Singapore on 27 April 1934 by the British colonial government in Singapore. The SSRNVR was formed to assist the Royal Navy in the defence of Singapore, upon which the defence of the Malay Peninsula was based. Also behind its formation were political developments in Asia, particularly the rise of a Japan that was increasingly assertive in Asia. In 1938, the SSRNVR was expanded with a branch in Penang. On 18 January 1935, the British Admiralty presented Singapore with an Acacia-class sloop, HMS Laburnum, to serve as the Reserve's Headquarters and drill ship. It was berthed at the Telok Ayer Basin. HMS Laburnum was sunk in February 1942, prior to the capitulation of Singapore at the beginning of Second World War activities in the Pacific.

With the outbreak of the Second World War in Europe, the SSRNVR increased the recruitment of mainly indigenous personnel into the force, to beef up local defences as Royal Navy resources were required in Europe. Members of the SSRNVR were called up to active duty and the force was augmented by members of the Royal Navy Malay Section. This formed the basis of the navy in Malaya, called the Malay Navy, manned by indigenous Malay personnel. (Similarly, the Malays were recruited into the fledgling Malay Regiment formed in 1936). The Malay Navy had a strength of 400 men who received their training at HMS Pelandok, the Royal Navy training establishment in Malaya. Recruitment was increased and in 1941 at the outbreak of the war in Asia, the Malay Navy had a strength of 1,450 men. Throughout the Second World War, the Malay Navy served with the Allied Forces in the Indian and Pacific theatre of operations. When the war ended with the Japanese Surrender in 1945, only 600 personnel of the Malay Navy reported for muster. Post war economic constraints saw the disbandment of the Malay Navy in 1947.

=== After world war II – Formation of the Malayan Naval Force ===
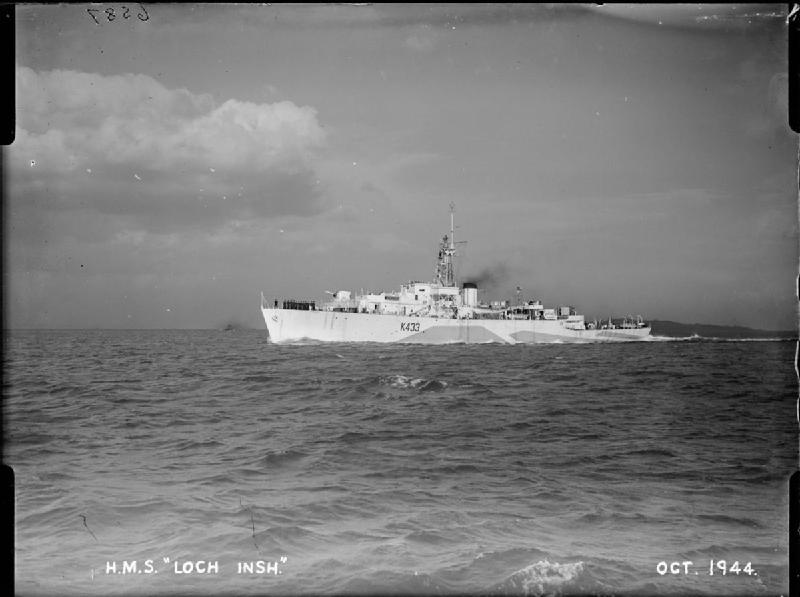
HMS Loch Insh, which later became Malaysia's flagship.

The Malay Navy was reactivated on 24 December 1948 at the outbreak of the Malayan Emergency, the communist-inspired insurgent war against the British colonial government. The Malayan Naval Force (MNF) regulation was gazetted on 4 March 1949 by the colonial authorities and was based at an ex-Royal Air Force radio base station in Woodlands, Singapore. The base was called the 'MNF Barracks' but was later renamed HMS Malaya. The Royal Naval Volunteer Reserve (RNVR) was reconstituted as a joint force comprising the Singapore Division and the Federation Division, by an Ordinance passed in Singapore in 1952. The main mission of the Malayan Naval Force (MNF) was coastal patrols to stop the communists receiving supplies from the sea. In addition, the Force was tasked with guarding the approaches to Singapore and other ports. The MNF was equipped with a River-class frigate, HMS Test, which was used as a training ship. By 1950, the MNF fleet had expanded to include the ex-Japanese minelayer HMS Laburnum, Landing Craft Tank (LCT) HMS Pelandok ("Mousedeer"), motor fishing vessel HMS Panglima ("Marshal"), torpedo recovery vessel HMS Simbang and several seaward defence motor launches (SDML). In August 1952, Queen Elizabeth II bestowed the title "Royal Malayan Navy" on the Malayan Naval Force in recognition of its sterling service in action during the Malayan Emergency.

=== Independence ===
Ensign (1957–1963).

Ensign (1963–1968).

On 12 July 1958, soon after attaining its independence on 31 August 1957, the Federation of Malaya negotiated with the British government to transfer British naval assets to the newly formed Royal Malayan Navy. With the hoisting of the Federation naval ensign – the White Ensign modified by the substituting the Union Flag with the Federation flag in the canton – the Royal Malayan Navy became responsible for Malaya's maritime self-defence. The "Royal" in Royal Malayan Navy was now in reference to the Yang di-Pertuan Agong, who became the Supreme Commander of the Malaysian Armed Forces. All ships, facilities and personnel serving in the Royal Malayan Navy were inherited by the Malayan government. The new force had an operational and training base at HMMS Malaya and a small coastal fleet of one LCT, one coastal minelayer, six Ham-class minesweepers and seven Ton-class minesweeper (the ex-RN 200th Patrol Squadron) on transfer from the Royal Navy.

On 16 September 1963, the naval force was renamed the Royal Malaysian Navy (RMN), following the formation of Malaysia. Eighteen Kris-class were ordered from Vosper and formed the mainstay of the navy for years to come. These 103 ft (31 m) boats were driven by Maybach diesels and capable of 27 knots (50 km/h; 31 mph). The Kris patrol boats were confined to coastal patrols and had short endurance. An offensive capability was acquired with the purchase of four Brave-class patrol boats also known as Perkasa-class patrol boats in RMN service. The Perkasa patrol boats were built for the RMN by Vosper Thorneycroft in 1967, powered by three Rolls-Royce Marine Proteus gas turbines as the main power plant with two diesel auxiliary engines for cruising and manoeuvring. These were armed with four 21-inch (53 cm) torpedoes, one Bofors 40 mm gun forward and one 20 mm cannon aft. They had a maximum speed of 54 knots (100 km/h) and was driven by triple propellers. The Royal Navy transferred the Loch-class frigate HMS Loch Insh to the RMN in 1964 and renamed KD (Kapal Di-Raja, "His Majesty's Ship") Hang Tuah. In 1965, during the Indonesian confrontation, Hang Tuah took over guardship duties off Tawau from HMAS Yarra. The ship served as the flagship of the RMN until it was decommissioned in the 1970s and scrapped. The RMN also used some of the decommissioned ship as a part of navy monument. This shop can be toured at Bandar Hilir, Melaka or at the Lumut Naval Base.

=== Malaysianisation ===
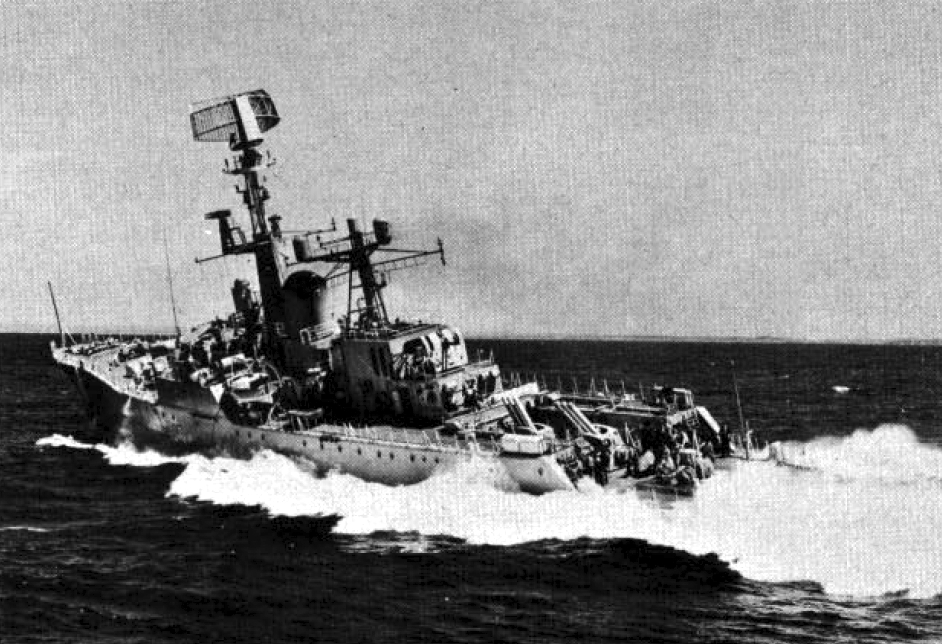
HMAS Yarra, an Australian Navy ship that guarded Malaysia during the Indonesian confrontation.

Following the end of Indonesian confrontation in 1966, Tunku Abdul Rahman and his colleagues decided to Malaysianise the top posts in the navy and air force. They offered these posts to two senior Malaysian army generals, who declined for two main reasons. First they felt that they were not professionally qualified and second because they did not want to jeopardise their own careers in the army. Tunku and his colleagues then decided that they would select two officers, one from the navy and one from the air force, and appoint them chiefs of their respective services. They were fully aware of Rear Admiral Datuk K. Thanabalasingam's age —he was 31 years old and a bachelor- but decided to appoint him and take the risk. Under Thanabalasingam and with Tunku Abdul Rahman's foresight and will, they were responsible for initiating the gradual transformation of the navy from a coastal navy (brown water force) to a sea-going navy (green water navy).

=== 1970s onwards ===
In 1977, the RMN acquired the frigate HMS Mermaid from the Royal Navy to replace the decommissioned Hang Tuah. The ship was also named KD Hang Tuah, but retained HMS Mermaid's pennant number of F76. Hang Tuah is a 2,300 standard ton light patrol frigate armed with twin 102 mm guns. Hang Tuah gradually reverted to a training role and continues in that role for the RMN. KD Rahmat (ex-Hang Jebat) (F24) joined the RMN in 1972. The 2,300-ton ship was a one-off Yarrow light frigate design for the RMN. The ship was originally named Hang Jebat but renamed after initial propulsion problems during pre-commissioning trials. It was the first Malaysian naval vessel equipped with a missile (Seacat) system. Rahmat was decommissioned in 2004.

The RMN purchased several types of missile boats in the 1970s and 1980s. These were four Perdana-class missile boats purchased from France and four Handalan-class missile boats purchased from Sweden. Both classes were armed with the Exocet MM38 missiles. The RMN also acquired two 1,100-ton Musytari-class offshore patrol vessels of Korean design. Sealift requirements were met by the purchases of several ex-United States Navy World War II-era LSTs. KD Sri Langkawi (A1500), ex-USS Hunterdon County, KD Sri Banggi (A1501), ex-USS Henry County and KD Rajah Jarom (A1502), ex-USS Sedgwick County, were replaced by KD Sri Indera Pura (1505), the Newport-class LST ex-USS Spartanburg County. Additional sealift capability is provided by two 4,300-ton, 100-metre support ships, KD Sri Indera Sakti (1503) and KD Mahawangsa (1504). Minehunting capabilities are provided by four Mahamiru-class minehunters. These are Italian-built ships based on the Lerici-class but displacing 610 tons. Hydrographic duties are handled by KD Perantau and KD Mutiara. A Naval Air Wing was also founded with the purchase of ex-Royal Navy Westland Wasps. Some ships of the RMN that have been decommissioned was transferred to the Malaysian Maritime Enforcement Agency (MMEA). MMEA had received more than 20 vessels from the RMN fleet to equip its enforcement operations from 2000s onwards.

=== Modernisation ===
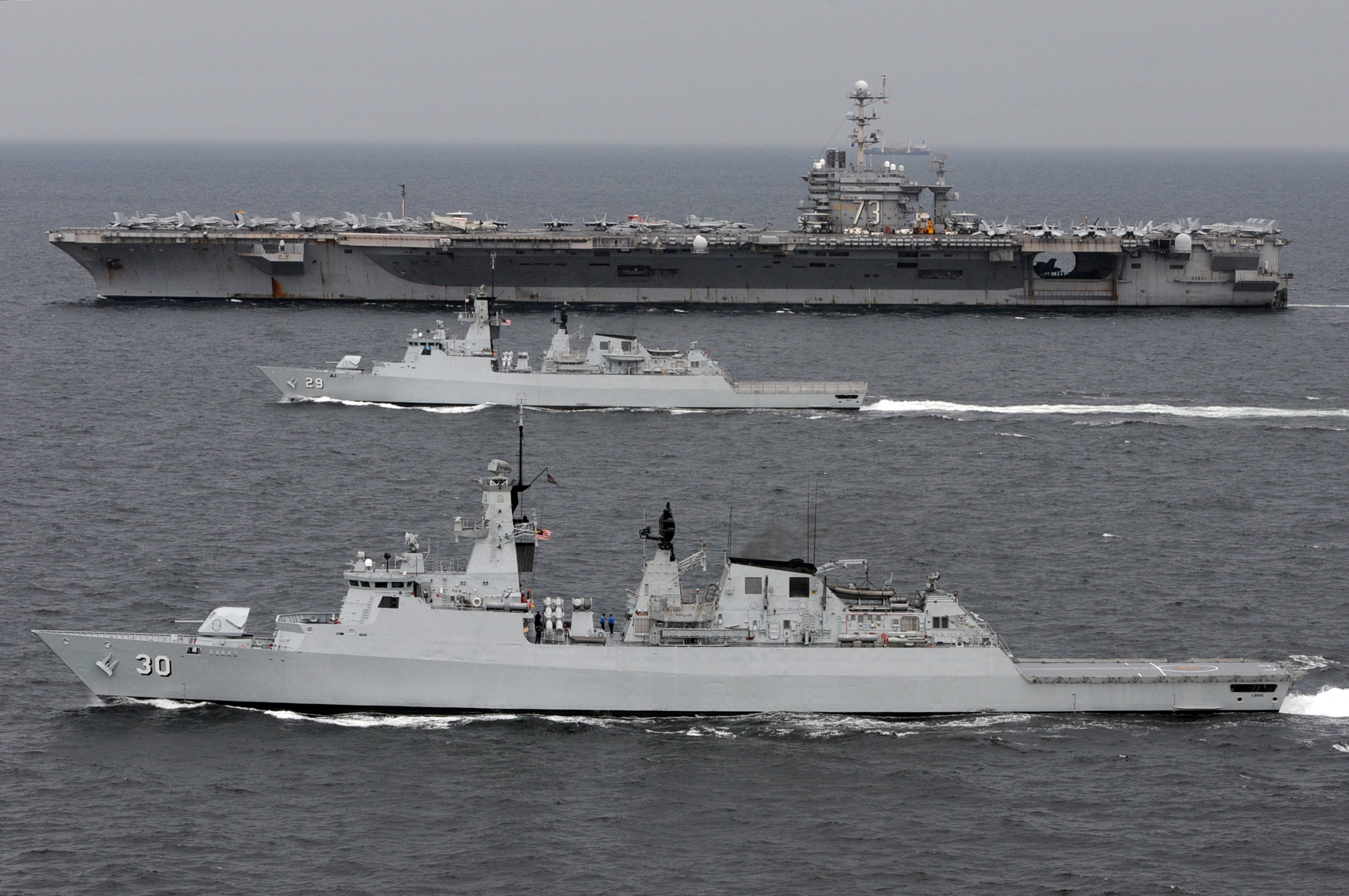
Lekiu-class frigates and Nimitz-class aircraft carrier during a transit of the Andaman Sea.

The modernisation of the RMN began in the late 1980s. Four Laksamana-class corvettes were purchased from Italy. These compact ships were originally built for Iraq, but were not delivered due to international sanctions put in place against Iraq. A prominent addition to the fleet were two Lekiu-class frigates. Based on the Yarrow F2000 design, the two 2,300-ton frigates are armed with Exocet MM40 II SSM and the Sea Wolf VLS point defence SAM system with accommodation for one Westland Super Lynx helicopter. Malaysia had planned to add new batch of Lekiu frigates but this was cancelled in August 2009. Complementing the two Lekiu frigates are two German-built Kasturi-class corvettes which were delivered in the early 1980s. Two Scorpène-class submarines were ordered by the RMN on 5 June 2002 under a €1.04 billion (about RM4.78 billion) contract to form the new submarine force. RMN also purchased six Kedah-class offshore patrol vessels and a batch of Littoral Mission Ships namely Keris-class littoral mission ship and Ada-class corvette to strengthen the fleet. In addition, the construction of new modern Maharaja Lela-class frigate also will make the RMN a formidable power in the region.

=== Anti-piracy efforts ===
The Royal Malaysian Navy has been patrolling the Gulf of Aden to thwart piracy since 2009. In January 2011, the navy foiled a hijacking attempt against the Malaysian-flagged chemical tanker MT Bunga Laurel carrying lubricating oil and ethylene dichloride. The navy ship KA Bunga Mas 5 responded after receiving a distress signal from the ship. A Fennec attack helicopter was used to pin down the pirate mothership as commandos boarded the tanker. The commandos injured three pirates in the battle to re-take the ship. 23 sailors were rescued and seven Somali pirates were detained. According to an 11 February 2011 online breaking news update by CNN's Brad Lendon, the seven Somalis, including three boys under 15 years old, could face the death penalty if convicted on charges of firing on Malaysian armed forces- navy commandos- while attempting to hijack the ship. The seven was sentenced for four to seven years in prison by Malaysian High Court on 2 September 2013. The ship was rescued 555 kilometres (300 nmi; 345 mi) from the coast of Oman.

The Royal Malaysian Navy was also involved in the operation to secure the release of MT Orkim Harmony that was hijacked in 2015 by a group of Indonesian pirates. All of the pirates were captured with the help of Vietnam Border Guard (VNBG), Vietnam Coast Guard (VNCG), Royal Australian Air Force and the Indonesian Navy.

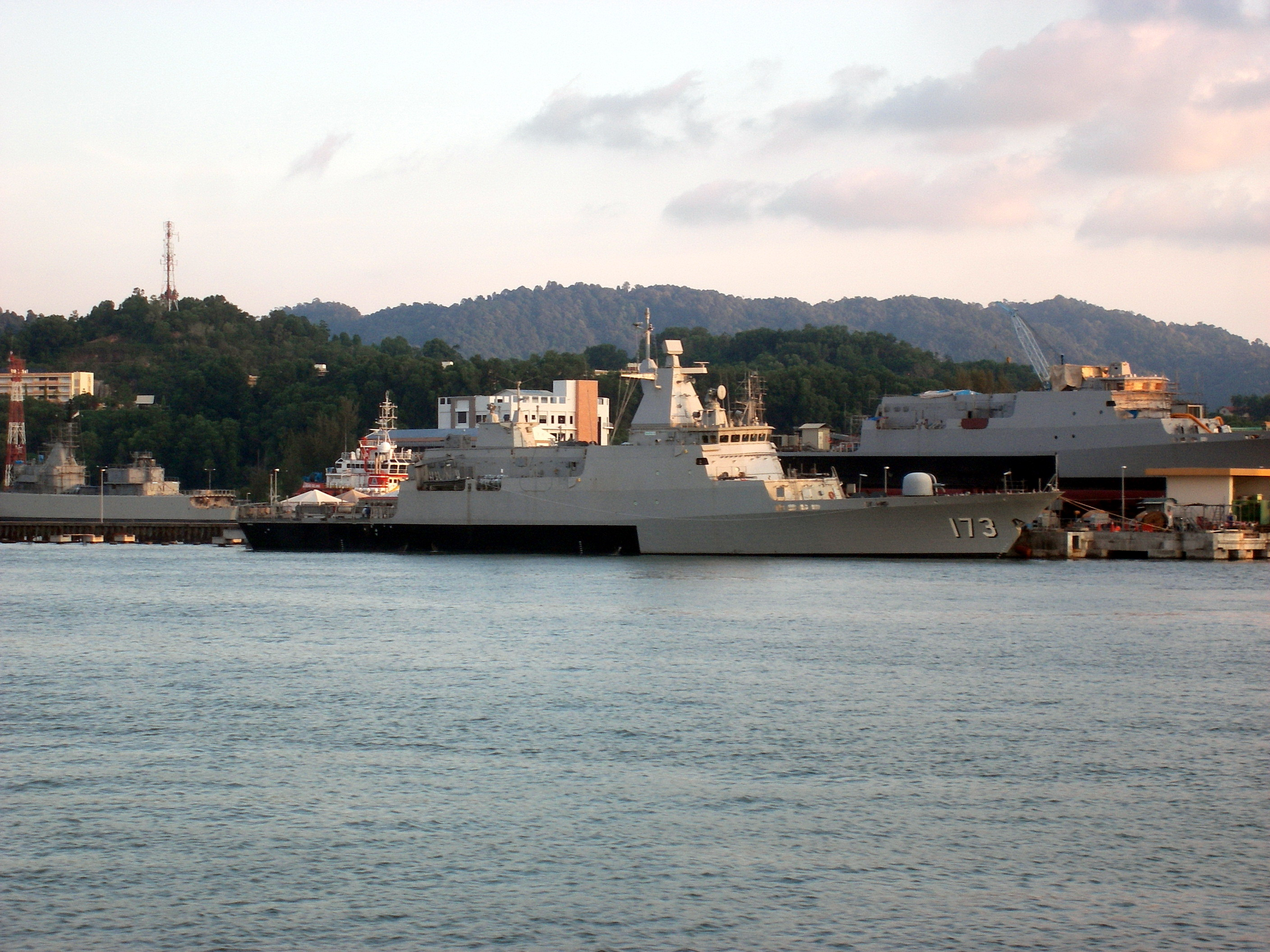
KD Perak, the Kedah-class offshore patrol vessel involved in the blockade during Lahad Datu standoff.

=== Sulu militants intrusion on Sabah ===
Following the Sulu militants' intrusion, a military standoff lasted from 11 February 2013 until 24 March 2013 after 235 militants, most of whom were armed, arrived by boats in Lahad Datu, Sabah, Malaysia from Simunul island, Tawi-Tawi in the southern Philippines on 11 February 2013. The group, calling themselves the "Royal Security Forces of the Sultanate of Sulu and North Borneo", was sent by Jamalul Kiram III, one of the claimants to the throne of the Sultanate of Sulu. Kiram stated that their objective was to assert the unresolved territorial claim of the Philippines to the eastern part of Sabah (which is the former North Borneo).

Malaysian security forces surrounded the village of Tanduo in Lahad Datu where the group had gathered and after several weeks of negotiations and broken deadlines for the intruders to withdraw, security forces moved in and routed the militants. The Royal Malaysian Navy enforced a naval blockade during and after the standoff to ensure that no more Sulu militants would be able to reach Sabah. The assets allocated for the blockade included KD Jebat, KD Perak, KD Todak, among many others. The RMN also provided a naval special warfare unit for joint operations with army, air force and police commandos to track down and neutralise any militants left after the standoff.

== Commanders ==
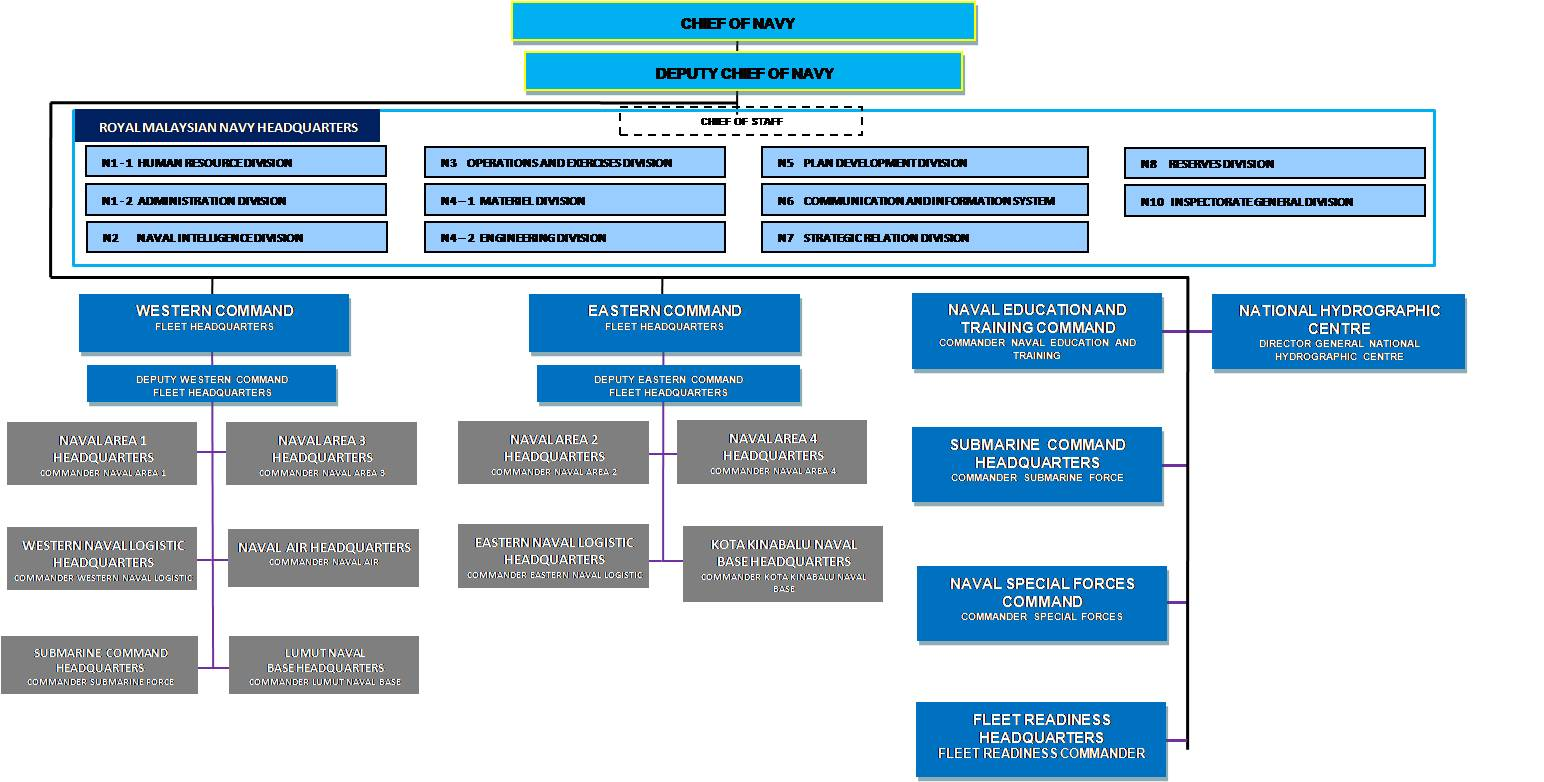

=== List of chiefs of the Royal Malaysian Navy ===
Source.

No	Name	Term Began	Term Ended
1	Commodore Edward Dudley Norman	15 May 1957	7 February 1960
2	Captain W.J. Dovers	8 February 1960	13 July 1962
3	Commodore A.M. Synnot	14 July 1962	March 1965
4	Commodore A.N. Dollard	March 1965	30 November 1967
5	Rear Admiral Tan Sri Dato' Seri K. Thanabalasingam	1 December 1967	31 December 1976
6	Vice Admiral Dato' Mohammad Zain Mohammad Salleh	1 January 1977	31 Januari 1986
7	Vice Admiral Tan Sri Abdul Wahab Hj Nawi	1 February 1986	31 October 1990
8	Vice Admiral Tan Sri Mohammad Shariff Ishak	1 November 1990	12 October 1995
9	Vice Admiral Tan Sri Ahmad Ramli Hj Mohd Nor	13 October 1995	14 October 1998
10	Admiral Tan Sri Dato' Seri Abu Bakar Abdul Jamal	14 October 1998	12 August 2002
11	Admiral Datuk Mohammad Ramly Abu Bakar	13 August 2002	12 August 2003
12	Admiral Tan Sri Dato' Seri Mohd Anwar Mohd Nor	13 August 2003	27 April 2005
13	Admiral Tan Sri Ilyas Hj Din	28 April 2005	14 November 2006
14	Admiral Tan Sri Ramlan Mohamed Ali	15 November 2006	31 March 2008
15	Admiral Tan Sri Dato' Seri Abdul Aziz Hj Jaafar	1 April 2008	18 November 2015
16	Admiral Tan Sri Ahmad Kamarulzaman Hj Ahmad Badaruddin	18 November 2015	29 November 2018
17	Admiral Tan Sri Mohd Reza Mohd Sany	30 November 2018	27 January 2023
18	Admiral Tan Sri Abdul Rahman Hj Ayob	27 January 2023	1 August 2024
19	Admiral Tan Sri Zulhelmy Ithnain	1 August 2024	current

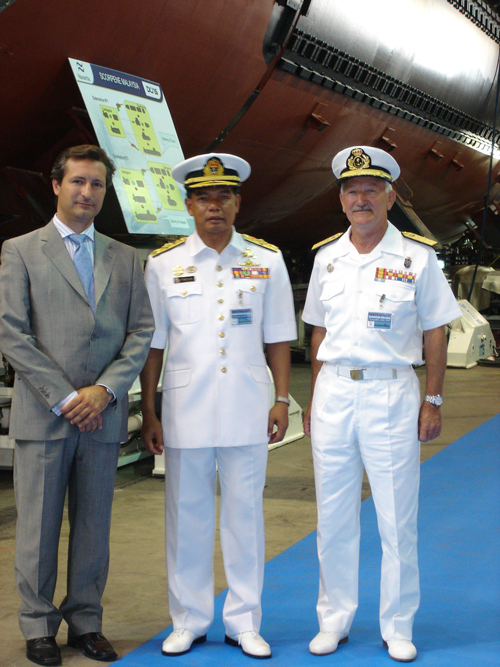
Admiral Tan Sri Ramlan Mohamed Ali in Spain

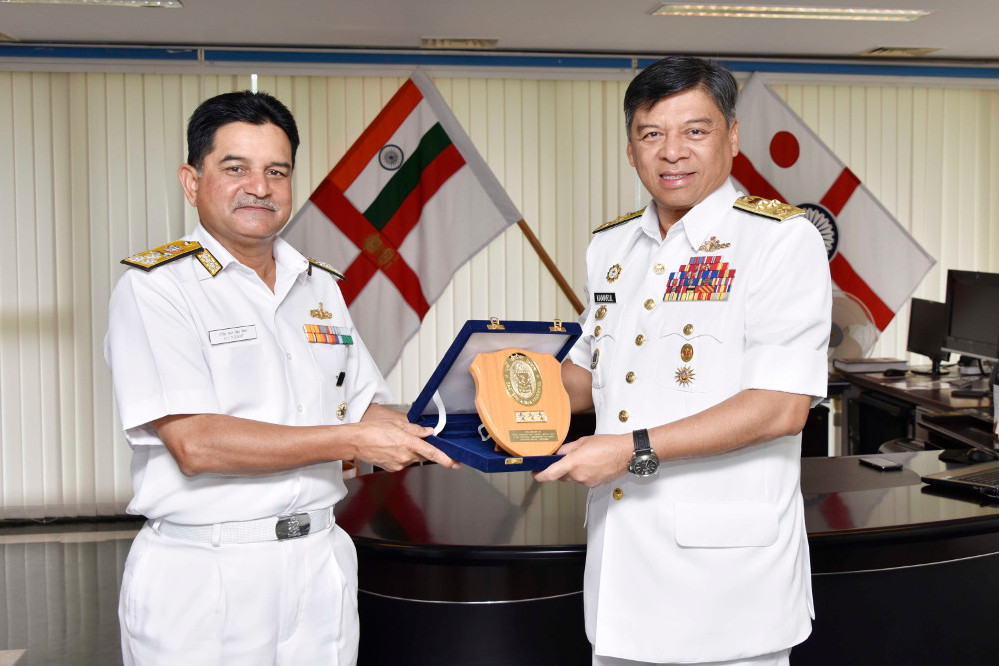
Admiral Tan Sri Ahmad Kamarulzaman Hj Ahmad Badaruddin in India

== Ranks ==
Sleeve insignia (known as Uniform No. 5, Overseas Service Dress) were similar from those of the Royal Navy, but rarely used and used exclusively during foreign visits.

Rank group	General/flag officers					Senior officers			Junior officers
Royal Malaysian Navy
Royal Malaysian Navy	Laksamana armada	Laksamana	Laksamana madya	Laksamana muda	Laksamana pertama	Kepten	Komander	Leftenan komander	Leftenan	Leftenan madya	Leftenan muda

The Sultan of Selangor, as Commodore-in-Chief of the RMN, holds the rank of Honorary Rear Admiral and as such wears a normal Rear Admiral's uniform.

Rank group	Senior NCOs				Junior NCOs		Enlisted
Royal Malaysian Navy								No insignia
Royal Malaysian Navy	Pegawai waran I	Pegawai waran II	Bintara kanan	Bintara muda	Laskar kanan	Laskar kelas I	Laskar kelas II	Perajurit muda

== Structure ==
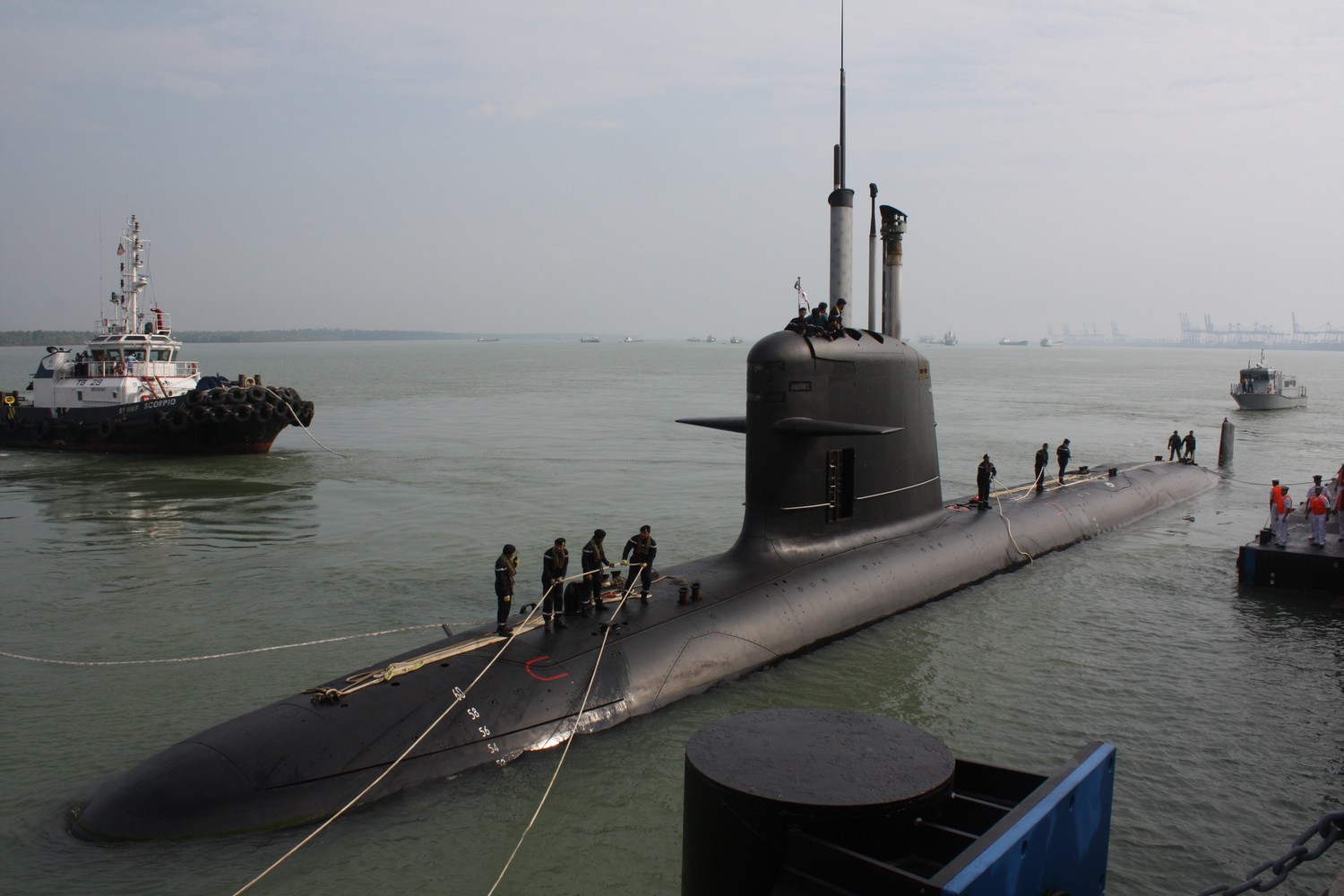
RMN Scorpène-class submarine.

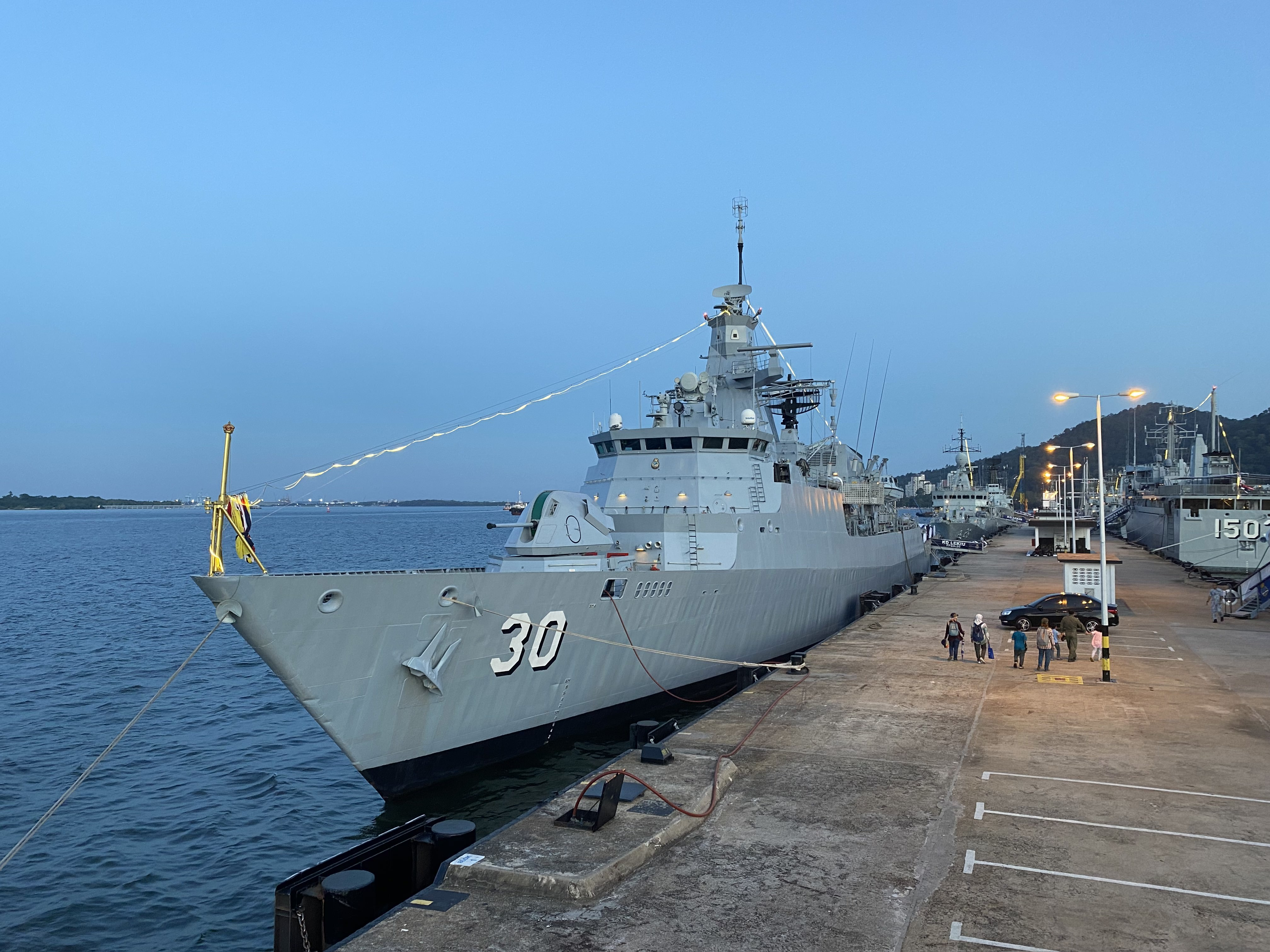
RMN Lekiu-class frigate.

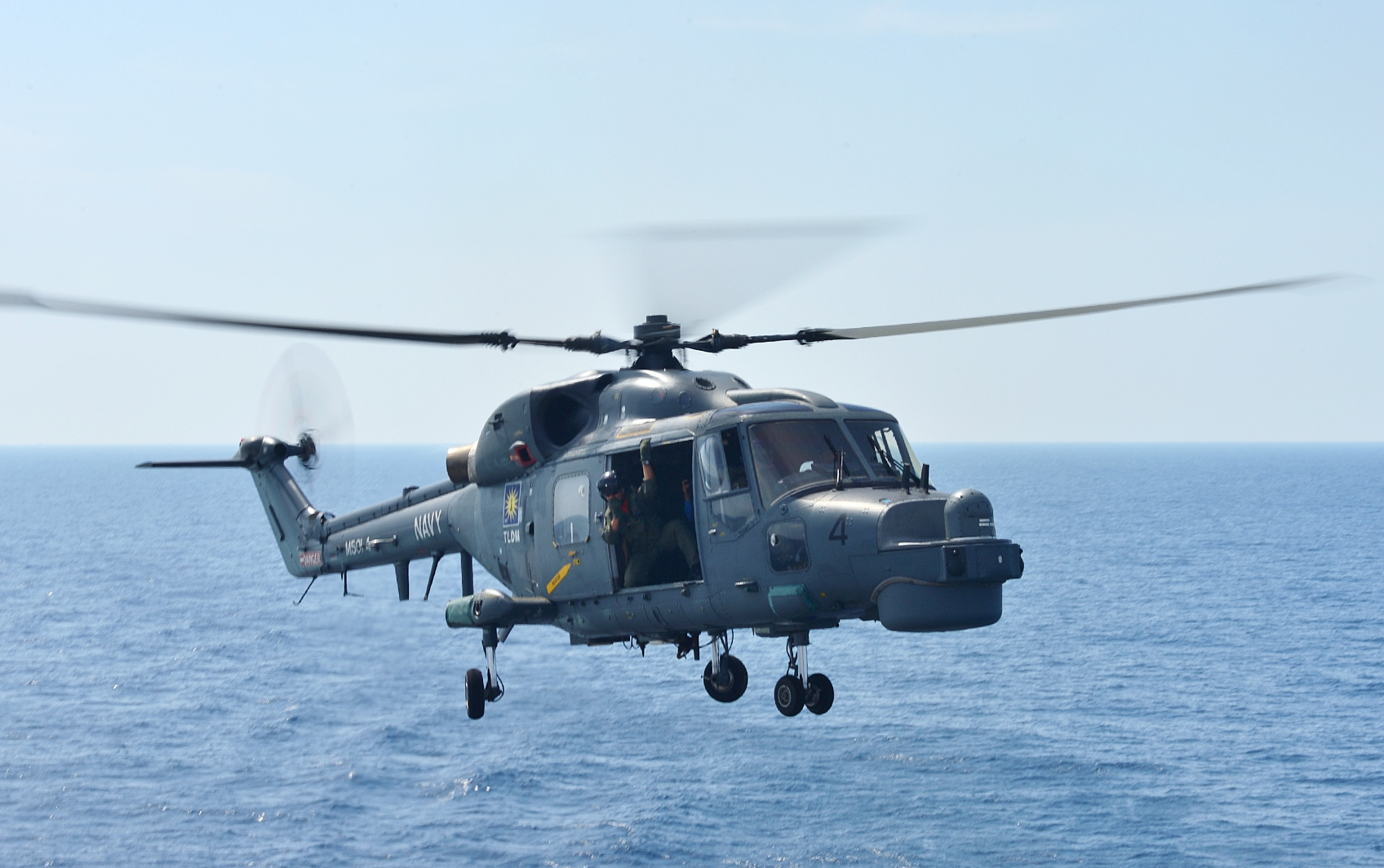
RMN Super Lynx ASW helicopter.

- Squadron Submarine
- Squadron 23rd Frigate
- Squadron 22nd Corvette
- Squadron 24th Corvette
- Squadron 17th PV
- Squadron 11th LMS
- Squadron 1st FAC
- Squadron 2nd FAC
- Squadron 6th FAC
- Squadron 13th PC
- Squadron 26th Mine Counter Measure Vessel
- Squadron 31st MPCSS
- Squadron 32nd Sealift
- Squadron 33rd Fast Troop Vessel
- Squadron 36th Hydro
- Squadron 27th Training Vessel
- Squadron Diving Tender
- Squadron Tug
- Squadron 501st Super Lynx
- Squadron 502nd Fennec
- Squadron 503rd AW139
- Squadron 601st UAS

== Fleets ==
Royal Malaysian Navy have two main fleets:

- Western Fleet (In Malay: Armada Barat)

- The fleet HQ was at Lumut Naval Base, Lumut, Perak. The chief of the fleet is Vice Admiral Dato’ Ts. Shamsuddin bin Hj Ludin.

- Eastern Fleet (In Malay: Armada Timur)

- The fleet HQ was at Sepanggar Naval Base, Sepanggar, Sabah. The chief of the fleet is Vice Admiral Datuk Hj Muhammad Ruzelme bin Hj Ahmad Fahimy.

== Naval bases ==
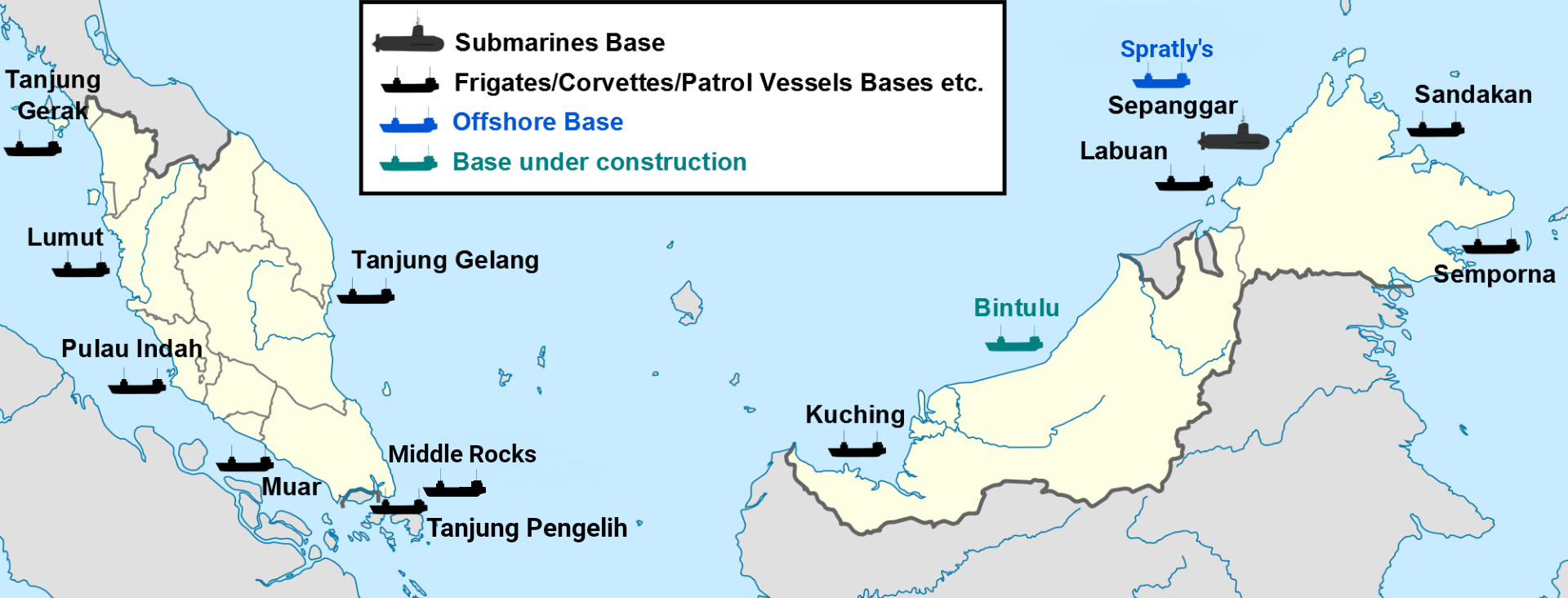
Bases of the Royal Malaysian Navy.

The RMN's Fleet HQ is called KD Malaya, in Lumut, Perak. Other bases are located at Tanjung Gelang, Kuantan, Pahang, which also serves as HQ Naval Region I and KD Sultan Ismail at Tanjung Pengelih, Johor, where the Recruit Training Centre is located. Bases are also located in Sandakan, Sabah. The principal submarine base is located at Sepanggar, Sabah, which also serves as HQ Naval Region II.

Another base is constructed on Pulau Langkawi, Kedah to provide the RMN with readier access into the Indian Ocean. Ready access into the Pacific Ocean is available via the existing base at Labuan and Semporna, Sabah.

=== List of naval bases ===
==== Peninsular Malaysia ====
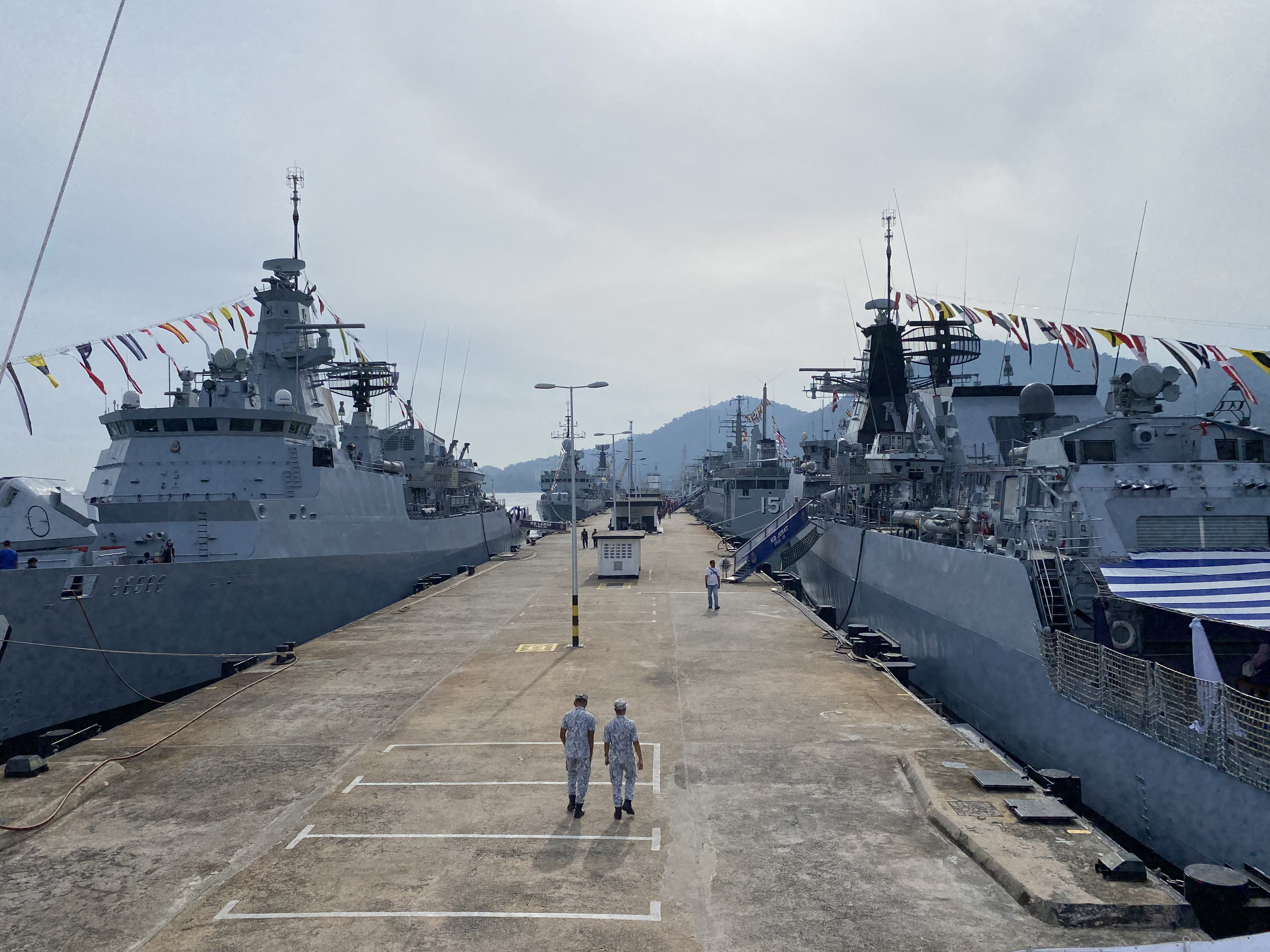
RMN ships docking at Lumut naval base during the 2022 Fleet Open Day.

- RMN Lumut Naval Base, Lumut, Perak (HQ Western Fleet and location of LUNAS)
- TLDM Tanjung Gelang, Kuantan, Pahang (HQ Naval Region I)
- TLDM Bukit Malut, Langkawi, Kedah (HQ Naval Region III) (KD Badlishah)
- TLDM Tanjung Pengelih, Johor (Recruit Training Centre) (PULAREK) (KD Sultan Ismail)
- National Hydrographic Centre, Pulau Indah, Selangor (KD Sultan Abdul Aziz Shah)
- TLDM Johor Bahru, Johor Bahru, Johor (KD Sri Medini)

==== East Malaysia ====
- TLDM Sepanggar, Kota Kinabalu, Sabah (HQ Eastern Fleet and HQ Submarine Force)
- TLDM Labuan, Federal Territory
- TLDM Sandakan, Sabah (HQ Naval Region II)
- TLDM Semporna, Sabah
- TLDM Kuching, Sarawak
- TLDM Bintulu, Sarawak (construction confirmed)
- TLDM Tawau, Sabah (KD Sri Tawau)

=== Offshore bases ===
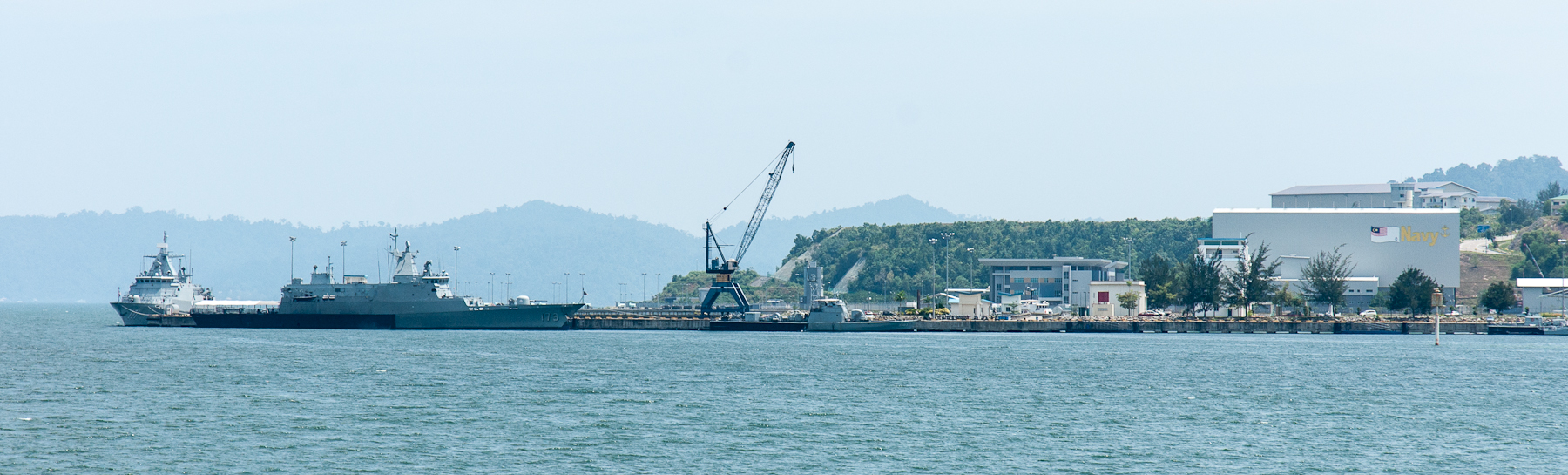
The RMN base in Sepanggar Bay, Kota Kinabalu, Sabah.

The Royal Malaysian Navy's five naval stations were originally built on outlying atolls, with the most developed Station Lima now expanded to a comfortably habitable naval station and also a popular diving spot in the region, in contrast with its harsh original conditions in 1983. On 21 June 1980 a claim plaque was erected on the island and three years later eighteen PASKAL men went ashore in May 1983 to build the first encampment while braving the elements. At the time, the only infrastructure available was a helipad for personnel transfer and the sailors had to camp under the open skies on the bare reef. When the naval station proper was constructed six years later with the construction of a small living-cum-operations quarters, it was also decided that the enlarged island the atoll had become would also be developed as a tourist attraction so that the tourism potential of the island could be exploited.

Thus by 1995, more buildings were added, including two air-conditioned accommodation blocks, an aircraft landing strip, two hangars, a radar station, an air traffic control tower, watchtowers and a jetty. The aviation facilities on the island allow the operation of C-130 Hercules transport planes and CN-235 maritime patrol aircraft operated by the Royal Malaysian Air Force. These facilities made the island a proper island station code-named Station Lima. Patrols by navy soldiers in CB90 attack boats and larger patrol vessels such as the Kedah-class offshore patrol vessels are carried out around the island. The Royal Malaysian Air Force also operate frequently on the airstrip. Several anti-ship and anti-aircraft guns are placed on several areas on the island and the RMAF personnel operate a Starburst air defence system to prevent low-level air attacks. The rest of the stations were originally floating barge type habitat modules constructed on mainland Malaysia. Location selection and module positioning was done during high tide so that they could be more easily anchored during low tide and after found satisfactory, the modules were landed and filled in with cement and rocks to strengthen their anchorages. They are all also equipped with radar and ship docking facilities as well as water and power generation facilities. Soldiers are stationed on all stations.

==== Offshore stations ====
- 1983 Station Lima (Swallow Reef)
- 1986 Station Uniform (Ardasier Reef)
- 1986 Station Mike (Mariveles Reef)
- 1999 Station Sierra (Erica Reef)
- 1999 Station Papa (Investigator Shoal)

== Special forces ==
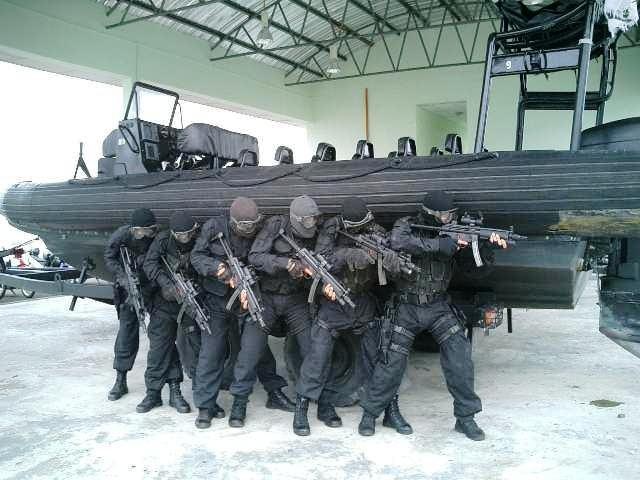
RMN Special Operations Force PASKAL.

The special forces of the RMN is known as PASKAL (Pasukan Khas Laut or Naval Special Warfare Forces). In peacetime, the unit is tasked with responding to maritime hijacking incidents as well as protecting Malaysia's numerous offshore oil and gas platforms. Its wartime roles include seaborne infiltration, sabotaging of enemy naval assets and installations, and the defence of RMN vessels and bases. This unit is analogous to the United States Navy SEALs. On 15 April 2009, PASKAL was renamed KD Panglima Hitam (KD being the equivalent of HMS in the Royal Navy). The ceremony was held at the RMN Lumut Naval Base to honour PASKAL's courage and loyalty to the nation. Panglima Hitam was the name given to brave and loyal Malay warriors who served during the golden age of the Malay Rulers (Sultans and Rajas) of Perak, Selangor, Johor and Negeri Sembilan.

== Present development ==
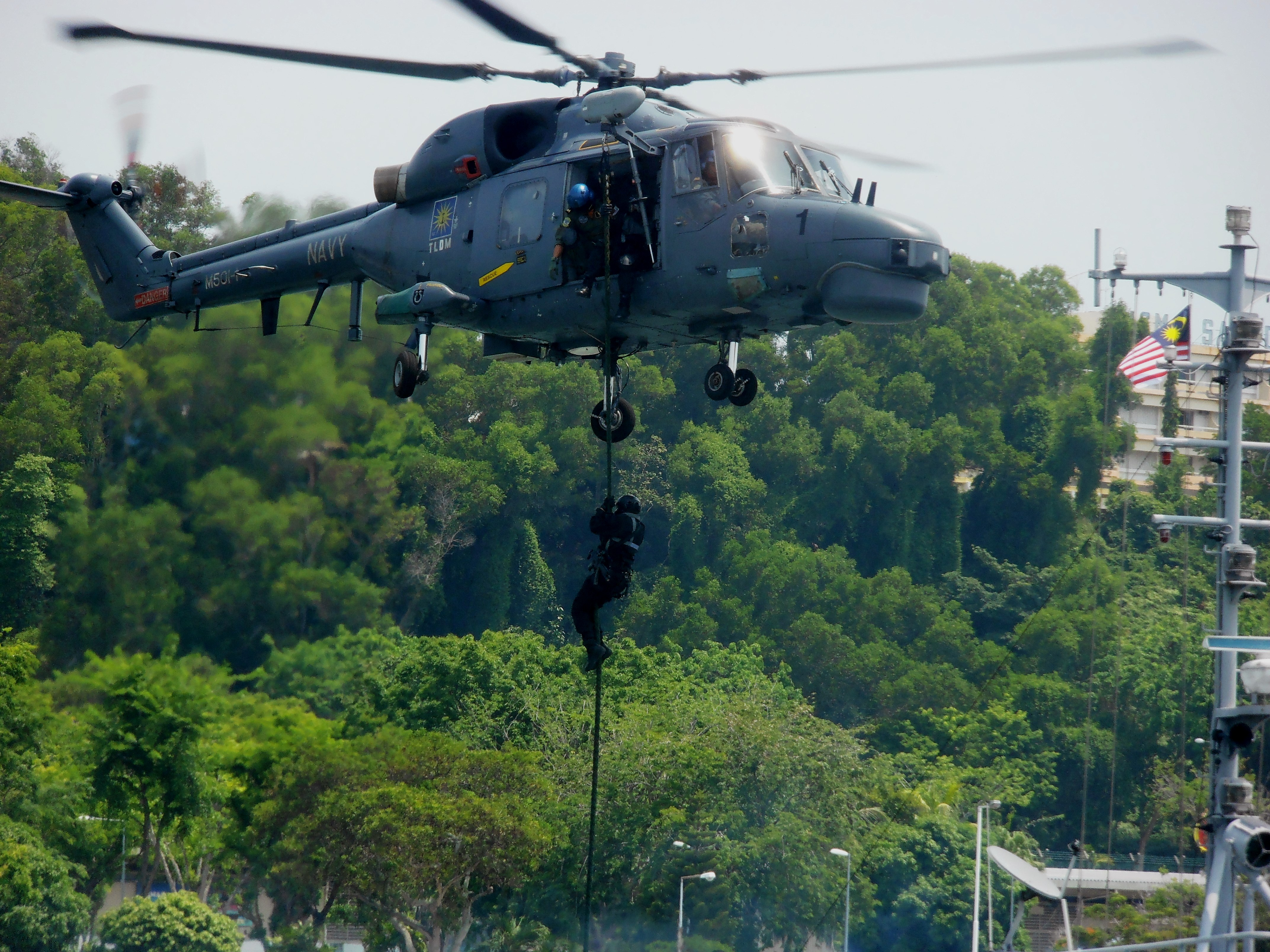
PASKAL team member using the rappeling from Super Lynx ASW helicopter during 82nd Anniversaries of RMN.

The navy has sought to modernise its fleet with the procurement of new vehicles through the New Generation Patrol Vessels (NGPV) program which produced the Kedah-class offshore patrol vessel and the Second Generation Patrol Vessel (SPGV) program which produced the Maharaja Lela-class frigate. It has also purchased Keris-class littoral mission ships (patrol vessels) and ordered three Littoral Mission Ship Batch 2 to fulfill its Littoral Mission Ship (LMS) program. Additionally, the navy has plans to procure a new class of amphibious warfare ships, Multi Role Support Ship (MRSS), for its fleet. As part of a modernisation plan launched in 2014, the navy has also launched the Service Life Extension Program (SLEP) upgrade program for aging vessels.

=== Kedah-class New Generation Patrol Vessel ===
In 1996, the RMN planned to acquire a total of 27 New Generation Patrol Vessels (NGPV) to full fill its future requirement. The German Blohm + Voss MEKO 100 based design was selected and a contract of six NGPVs was signed in 2003. However, due to management failure of the main contractor, PSC-Naval Dockyard Sdn Bhd (PSC-ND), progression was seriously delayed and led the programme into crisis. This may also affect the initial planned total number of NGPVs to be decreased. However, under the intervention of the Malaysian Government, Boustead Heavy Industries Corporation took over the PSC-ND, thus regaining momentum for the programme. After a long wait of 18 months, the first two hulls, KD Kedah commissioned in June 2006 and KD Pahang commissioned in August 2006. As of July 2009, all six ships had been launched. Subsequently, good progression of the programme has regained interest in the Malaysian decision makers to order the second batch of six NGPVs. Navy Chief Admiral Datuk Abdul Aziz bin Jaafar had recently unveiled that the navy is interested to have the second batch of NGPV ASW configured. The ASW configured NGPV is expected to be able to co-ordinate operations with the Scorpène submarines. The ships will also be upgrade with missiles.

=== Scorpène-class submarine ===
Two Scorpène-class submarines were ordered by the RMN on 5 June 2002 under a €1.04 billion (about RM4.78 billion) contract. The two Scorpène submarines were built jointly by the French shipbuilder, Naval Group and its Spanish partner, Navantia. They are armed with Blackshark wire-guided torpedoes and Exocet SM-39 sub-launched anti-ship missiles. The submarine programme also included the redeployment of an Agosta-class submarine retired from the French Navy, for the training of submarine crews. The training of 150 Malaysian sailors, mainly in Brest, France, represented an important aspect of the programme. In 2006, the RMN had launched a nationwide competition to select the names for the first two Malaysian submarines. On 26 July, RMN announced these vessels will be named after historic Malaysians. The first hull will be named KD Tunku Abdul Rahman and the second hull KD Tun Abdul Razak. These vessels are classified as Perdana Menteri class in service with RMN. The first vessel, KD Tunku Abdul Rahman was launched on 24 October 2007 at the Naval Group dockyard, Cherbourg, France.

On 3 September 2009, the first Scorpène submarine of Malaysia KD Tunku Abdul Rahman, arrived at a Port Klang naval base on peninsular Malaysia's west coast after a 54-day voyage from France. Another base is also being constructed on Pulau Langkawi, Kedah to provide the RMN with readier access into the Indian Ocean. Ready access into the Pacific Ocean is available via the existing base at Semporna, Sabah. Defects and problems were found in the submarines such as the inability to submerge and faults in the coolant system of the first submarine, causing delays in the delivery of the second submarine. In October 2012, the Malaysian Navy chief Tan Sri Abdul Aziz Jaafar said that the submarines were in good condition and operational after all the defects repaired by manufacturer.

=== Utility and anti-submarine helicopter ===
The Malaysian government is also considering to increase the total of helicopters for the RMN. This includes both utility and anti-submarine helicopter. In September 2020, it is confirmed that Malaysia has sign the contract to purchase three maritime operations helicopter for utility role. The model selected was AgustaWestland AW139. For anti-submarine helicopter, RMN planned to add with either AW-159, Sikorsky MH-60R Seahawk or the Airbus Helicopters H225M. In 2016, an Italian-aerospace defence company, the Finmeccanica has signed a teaming agreement with Malaysian defence vehicle company, the Global Komited to jointly distribute AgustaWestland AW159 helicopters if it was selected by the Malaysian government. Navy chief Admiral Datuk Abdul Aziz Jaafar unveiled an intention of the navy to acquire at least six ASW helicopters as a complement to the soon to be commissioned Maharaja Lela-class frigate.

=== Multi Role Support Ship (MRSS) ===
RMN has an outstanding requirement for a Multi Role Support Ship (MRSS) to replace KD Sri Inderapura. The MRSS was to be included in the Ninth Malaysian Plan but was postponed due to the 2008 financial crisis.

=== Maharaja Lela-class frigate / Littoral Combat Ship (LCS) ===
Malaysia has launched its program to procure new class of modern frigate. The program is called Second Generation Patrol Vessel. In 2014, Malaysia signed a contract agreement worth MYR9 billion (US$2.8 billion) which was awarded to Boustead Heavy Industries Corporation to build frigates under the program. The ships will be built based on the Gowind 2500 corvette designed by French shipbuilder Naval Group.

=== Littoral Mission Ship (LMS) ===
Malaysia had planned to owned a total of 18 ships of the littoral mission ship in its fleet. In 2016, Malaysia agreed to purchase a littoral mission ship from China where the ships will be built by China Shipbuilding & Offshore International. The first ship will be delivered by 2019, the second and third by 2020 and the fourth by 2021 for the first batch of this program. For the second batch of littoral mission ship program, Malaysia had chooses Ada-class corvette made by Turkey company, Savunma Teknolojileri Muhendislik (STM). Three ship will be built for the second batch of littoral mission ship program.

=== Unmanned aerial vehicle ===
RMN has set a requirements for the maritime surveillance using unmanned aerial vehicle (UAV). Under Maritime Security Initiatives (MSI) program initiated by United States, Malaysia will receive a total of 18 Boeing Insitu ScanEagle. First six unit delivered to RMN in 2020 and another 12 unit in 2021.

=== Service Life Extension Program (SLEP) ===
THALES Naval Division was selected as the contractor of the Service Life Extension Program (SLEP) involving the Kasturi-class corvettes – KD Kasturi, KD Lekir and two Mahamiru (Lerici)-class minehunters – KD Mahamiru, KD Ledang. The corvettes will receive radar and fire control upgrade while the minehunters will receive the new wide band sonar, CAPTAS-2. The program aim to extend the service life of these surface combatants by another 10 years. In the future, RMN also planned to give SLEP for other ships in the fleet to lengthening service period of older ships.

=== 15 to 5 program ===
The RMN took a drastic approach by launching the '15 to 5' Fleet Transformation Program to ensure that the organisation continues as one of the powers in the region. The RMN Future Fleet 15 to 5 program is aimed at equipping the RMN with Scorpène-class submarines, Maharaja Lela-class frigates, Kedah-class offshore patrol vessels, Littoral Mission Ship (LMS) and Multi Role Support Ship (MRSS).

== See also ==
- Malaysian Armed Forces
  - Malaysian Army
  - Royal Malaysian Air Force
- Malaysia Coast Guard
- Royal Malaysia Police
- Royal Johor Military Force
- Joint Forces Command
