= Puteri Gunung Ledang (film) =

2004 film

- Theatrical one-sheet poster
- Directed by: Saw Teong Hin
- Written by: Mamat Khalid; Saw Teong Hin
- Produced by: Tiara Jacquelina; Shazalli Ramly
- Starring: M. Nasir; Adlin Aman Ramlee; Tiara Jacquelina
- Cinematography: Jason Kwan
- Edited by: Kate James
- Music by: M. Nasir; Tan Yan Wei
- Release date: 31 August 2004
- Running time: 145 minutes
- Country: Malaysia
- Languages: Malay; Indonesian
- Budget: MYR 20 million
- Box office: MYR 2.9 million

Puteri Gunung Ledang (English: Princess Of Mount Ledang) is a 2004 Malaysian Malay-language epic period fantasy romance film directed by Saw Teong Hin. The film is based on the Malay legend of the Gunung Ledang princess, who is said to have lived on top of Gunung Ledang, and a Malaccan sultan's effort to court her. The film stars Tiara Jacquelina (who also co-produces it alongside Shazalli Ramly), M. Nasir and Adlin Aman Ramlie.

It was the first big-budget Malaysian movie ever made, with a production cost of US$4 million.

== Development ==
Mamat Khalid pitched the original idea of creating a love story between the Princess of Mount Ledang and legendary warrior Hang Tuah for a television series called Hikayat. When Tiara Jacquelina heard his story, she stopped him from pursuing the project, insisting that the story was "too good" for television. The story was eventually expanded into a film project.

Filming took place over the course of 92 days spread over nine months. Meanwhile, Tiara had visited the Mangkunegaran Palace in Solo, Java to do further research to prepare her for the 'princess' role.

== Plot ==
Set in the late 15th-century Sultanate of Malacca and the Javanese kingdom of Majapahit, against a backdrop of war and mysticism, the film is about the forbidden romance that blossomed between Gusti Putri, a Javanese Hindu princess, and Hang Tuah, the famed Malay Muslim warrior from Melaka.

Gusti Putri Retno Dumillah (Tiara Jacquelina), a princess of the Majapahit Kingdom, has fallen in love with Malaccan warrior Hang Tuah (M. Nasir). The Princess leaves her assigned palace life without the consent of her king, traveling to Mount Ledang in the hopes of being reunited with her beloved.

Soon after the princess’ parting, Majapahit is attacked by the Sultanate of Demak. Desperate to quell the invasion, Gusti Putri's brother and King, Gusti Adipati Handaya Ningrat (Alex Komang), offers his sister's hand in marriage to the Prince of Demak. Her absence renders this solution impossible. The King's only hope for security is to forge an alliance with the Malaccan Sultanate by offering his sister's hand in marriage to Sultan Mahmud of Malacca (Adlin Aman Ramli).

Hang Tuah is ordered to head the royal delegation to present the royal proposal to Gusti Putri. The warrior leads the convoy up Mount Ledang. Gusti Adipati is angry that Hang Tuah is getting in his way and invokes supernatural powers to combat him. Despite his supernatural prowess, he is defeated by Hang Tuah and his magical Taming Sari kris. The injured Gusti Adipati expresses that the fate of his country is more important than love, and Hang Tuah's meddling has destroyed his only hope of saving his people. The guilty Hang Tuah resigns from his post as Admiral and cast his Taming Sari kris into the river, never to be found again.

After a fleeting reunion, the Princess is aware that her beloved's foremost duty is that of a warrior. Despite confessing his love for her, Hang Tuah will not forsake the Sultan's wishes. Brokenhearted, she agrees to marry the Sultan on the proviso that he can fulfill seven prohibitive conditions:

- A bridge made of pure gold from Malacca to Mount Ledang;
- Another bridge made of pure silver from Mount Ledang to Malacca;
- Seven trays (dulang) of the hearts of mosquitoes;
- Seven trays (dulang) of the hearts of the germs;
- Seven jars (tempayan) of the juice of young betel nuts, despite young betel nuts not having juice;
- Seven jars (tempayan) of the tears of virgins
- One bowl of blood from his fondest and only son, Prince Ahmad.

When the Sultan learns of the Princess' prohibitive conditions, he is more determined to marry her. But before he can draw blood from his son, a mental projection of Gusti Putri appears before him, explaining that her conditions were in fact an indirect refusal of his proposal. The angered Sultan plants a curse on her, stating that from next sunlight whomsoever sees the princess will die coughing blood.

Hang Tuah, having heard of the curse of the Sultan from the Bendahara, rushes to Mount Ledang to see her one last time. He only arrives after the sun has risen, but Gusti Putri reveals herself to him. It is unknown what their final fate will be.

== Cast ==
- Tiara Jacquelina as Gusti Putri, the Mount Ledang princess
- M. Nasir as Hang Tuah
- Rahim Razali as Datuk Bendahara
- Adlin Aman Ramlie as Sultan Mahmud Shah
- Sofia Jane as Queen Tun Teja
- Khir Rahman as Tun Mamat
- Alex Komang as Gusti Adipati Handaya Ningrat
- Christine Hakim as Bayan
- Ruminah Sidek as Nenek Kebayan (Gusti Putri's alter ego)
- Azmil Mustapha as Pangeran Demak
- Sabri Yunus as Sang Setia
- Man Bai as Iqbal
- Radhi Khalid as Tapik
- Slamet Rahardjo as Patih
- Muhammad Naufal Nasullah as Raja Ahmad
- Melissa Saila as Raja Ahmad's Governess
- Dian Sastrowardoyo as Medicine Seller's Daughter (cameo)

Tiara Jacquelina and M Nasir also provide the theme songs for the film; the former with "Asmaradana" produced by Edry Abdul Halim, while the latter with "Bagaikan Sakti" which features Siti Nurhaliza.

== Awards ==
Puteri Gunung Ledang won five awards at the Malaysian Film Festival 2004 including best director, best screenplay, best art direction, best music score. Tiara Jacquelina won the "Best Actress" category at the 50th Asia Pacific Film Festival, as well as the "Best Producer" award at the inaugural Asian Festival of First Films in Singapore (2005).

This film was submitted as Malaysia's official entry for the 2004 Academy Awards but failed to be long-listed.

== Adaptation ==
The Legend of Gunung Ledang is set during the rule of Sultan Mahmud. At this time, Hang Tuah was already an old man at the end of his career, for he had begun his royal service during the reign of Sultan Mansur, who was Sultan Mahmud's grandfather. The film modifies this by making Hang Tuah still a physically capable man.

The most notable change to the film is that the original legend doesn't feature any romantic relationship between Hang Tuah and the Princess of Gunung Ledang. In some versions of the tale, Hang Tuah did not even make it to the peak of Mount Ledang, for he was already ailing in health. The man who made it to the peak and presented the proposal in Hang Tuah's stead is a young warrior named Tun Mamat. The Puteri was also never subject to any curse from the Sultan, for he was the one who rejected her, not the other way round as depicted in the film.

Relatively minor changes are that the Princess is a Majapahit human princess with supernatural abilities, while in the legend she is not of this world.

== See also ==
- Puteri Gunung Ledang
- Puteri Gunong Ledang, 1961 film
- Hikayat Hang Tuah
