= Puteri Gunung Ledang (musical) =

- The Musical
- Original box office poster
- Music: Dick Lee
- Lyrics: Adlin Aman Ramlie
- Book: Saw Teong Hin; Zahim Albakri; Adlin Aman Ramlie
- Basis: Puteri Gunung Ledang
- Productions: 2006 Istana Budaya Season 1; 2006 Istana Budaya Season 2; 2006 Singapore; 2009 Istana Budaya Season 3

Puteri Gunung Ledang is a Malaysian musical directed by Zahim Albakri, co-directed by Adlin Aman Ramlie, book by Adlin Aman Ramlie, Saw Teong Hin and Zahim Al-Bakri and music composed by Dick Lee. The musical is based on the 2004 Puteri Gunung Ledang film. The original production was staged at the Istana Budaya in February 2006, this was followed by two more productions and an upcoming third in February 2009. Tiara Jacquelina and Stephen Rahman-Hughes starred as Gusti Putri and Hang Tuah in all the productions to date. Other members of the production team are music director Roslan Aziz, choreographer Pat Ibrahim and production designer Raja Malek. The musical was staged in poetic Malay and Javanese-accented Malay, but English subtitles were provided.

== Synopsis ==
Set late in the 15th Century, the musical tells the tale of Gusti Putri, a princess of Majapahit who falls in love with the Malaccan warrior Hang Tuah. The pair first meet when a Malaccan entourage arrives in Majapahit, and both are immediately intrigued with the other's charm and intelligence.

When Majapahit is threatened by a coup, the king Gusti Adipati asks Sultan Mahmud of Malacca for help. Sultan Mahmud promises his aid on the condition that he be allowed to marry Gusti Putri. Gusti Adipati agrees to the condition, not realising that his sister has fallen for another. Sultan Mahmud then sends Tuah to lead a delegation to warn Majapahit's enemy. Gusti Putri, overcome with longing for her beloved, decides to leave Majapahit for Mount Ledang, where she will wait for Tuah.

Gusti Adipati learns that his sister has fled, and chases her to Malacca. When Sultan Mahmud learns that Gusti Putri is on Gunung Ledang, he sends Tuah as his delegate to formally present his proposal of marriage to her. The lovers are reunited on Gunung Ledang, but Gusti Putri is disappointed to learn that Hang Tuah has sought her out on behalf of his king.

Gusti Putri then sets seven conditions for Sultan Mahmud to fulfil before she will accept his proposal, the seventh condition being a bowl of his young son's blood. Before Sultan Mahmud can kill his own son, Gusti Putri stops him, declaring that the conditions were a rejection and all she wants is to live on Gunung Ledang in peace. Enraged, Sultan Mahmud condemns her to live forever alone on Gunung Ledang.

== Development ==
=== Early development ===
Tiara Jacquelina and Pat Ibrahim began discussing the idea of a musical version of the Princess of Gunung Ledang story during the development of the film, during which Pat began having meetings with Singaporean composer Dick Lee to discuss the idea. The critical and commercial success of the film became the deciding factor for pursuing a stage version. It was decided that the musical version would follow the storyline established by the film, due to audience's familiarity with it, but with a more contemporary feel in order to appeal to younger audience members. Accordingly, the character of Gusti Putri, who was sombre and philosophical in the film, was reinterpreted as being younger and more playful in the stage version. Tiara said that the reinterpretation of the character was in part inspired by the success of her music single "Asmaradana", which was recorded for the film and became a hit among young Malaysian music fans, drawing their attention to the film itself.

Saw Teong Hin, who directed the film, was invited to write the book. He was later joined by Zahim Albakri and Adlin Aman Ramlie as co-writers. Together with composer Dick Lee, conductor and musician Jason Voo, music producer Roslan Aziz and arts students from the Universiti Teknologi MARA, they held a 10-day workshop for the musical, working on the script and songs. Following the workshop, Saw, who had been invited to direct the production, bowed out due a conflicting project. Writers Zahim and Adlin became the director and co-director respectively.

Raja Malek's stupas forming the peak of Mount Ledang, upon which Gusti Putri (Tiara Jacquelina) and Tuah (Stephen Rahman-Hughes) are reunited. Photo by Wan Izhar.

=== Production design ===
Production designer Raja Malek obtained inspiration from museum exhibits for the look of period Majapahit and Malacca. Raja Malek developed the idea of using stupas that could be rotated and rearranged to form various parts of the set. The stupas were inspired by the "Pintu Gerbang", the oldest remains of Majapahit civilisation that consist of two large pillars on either side of a gateway. The pillars represent the two Javanese mountains Gunung Agung and Gunung Merapi.

=== Casting ===
Tiara Jacquelina and Adlin Aman Ramlie, who had portrayed Gusti Putri and Sultan Mahmud in the film, were quickly signed on to reprise their roles in the stage version. A. C. Mizal, actor and former member of boyband 4U2C, was cast late into pre-production as Gusti Adipati Handaya Ningrat.

For the other lead role of Hang Tuah, established actor and singer M. Nasir, who had portrayed the character in the film, could not commit to the musical due to other projects. Even with rehearsals in full swing and a confirmed date at the Istana Budaya, a replacement had not been found. Eventually, Stephen Rahman-Hughes, a Malaysian-born West End actor was chosen on the recommendations of TV3 chairman Farid Ridzuwan CEO of TV station and Kavita Kaur to the production team. Rahman-Hughes signed on to the project in December 2005, barely two months before opening night. The challenge lay in coaching Rahman-Hughes in Malay, a language he was not fluent in.

== Story adaptation ==
In the original Legend of Gunung Ledang, Sultan Mahmud of Malacca sends his emissary, Hang Tuah, to Gunung Ledang to present his royal proposal of marriage to the mystical Princess of Mount Ledang. The Princess and Hang Tuah are independently famous figures of Malayan history-mythology, and it is only in this specific story that the two briefly cross paths, though in some versions of the tale it is Tun Mamat, not Tuah, who presents the proposal to the Princess as Tuah was too old and weak to reach the mountain peak. The original concept of the Puteri Gunung Ledang, as pitched by Mamat Khalid, was to pose the question of what would happen if these two characters had met and fallen in love.

=== Characters ===
In the original story, the Princess is mysterious and magical, hinting that she is supernatural in origin. In contrast, the stage musical followed the precedent set by the film by making the Princess a mortal human being, and uses the unique creation of the love affair between her and Tuah as the reason she decides to live on Mount Ledang. In order to set up the Princess as a mortal princess, the Majapahit empire was chosen as her kingdom of origin. At the time of Sultan Mahmud’s rule, the Majapahit empire was a powerful neighbour of Malacca. The Princess was set up as the younger sister of the Adipati (King) of Majapahit at that time.

Hang Tuah is an actual Malaccan historical figure, but his career as a Laksamana (Admiral) began during the reign of Sultan Mansur, who was Sultan Mahmud’s grandfather. By the time Sultan Mahmud became ruler of Malacca, Hang Tuah was an old man at the end of his life. However, the musical opts to show Tuah as still being in his prime of his career, though the age gap between him and the Princess is acknowledged by a line in the show when the Princess remarks that she was a child when she saw the famous Admiral Tuah for the first time.

=== Story focus ===
The original legend centres on the Princess’ response to Sultan Mahmud's proposal. During the time of the old Malay Sultanates the Sultans were believed to have ‘daulat’, a divine right bestowed from God that gives them absolute power over the land and its people. It is because of this that the Princess, though she was not interested in his proposal, did not refuse him outright. Instead she set for him seven impossible tasks for him to fulfil, but Sultan Mahmud was either too proud or too blind to realize that the tasks were her way of turning him down, and when he attempted to fulfil them Malacca fell into ruin.

The musical instead focuses on the love story between the mortal characters of the Princess and Tuah. The seven impossible tasks are only briefly mentioned towards the end of Act 2, near the finale.

Due to the romantic nature of the reinterpreted story, the finale was made bittersweet, with Sultan Mahmud cursing the Princess to live forever on Mount Ledang alone. In the original legend, the Princess was never condemned by a curse as she was beyond the Sultan's jurisdiction, and it is Sultan Mahmud who ultimately suffered by trying to fulfil her seven conditions. Historically, Sultan Mahmud was the last Sultan of Malacca, and at the end of his reign had to flee from his city, thus ending the Malaccan Sultanate. This Sultan Mahmud is sometimes confused with his great-grandson, Sultan Mahmud II, who was assassinated on his royal dais.

=== Tun Teja ===
The musical's reinterpreted love story of Tuah and the Puteri bears similarity to the love story between Tuah and Tun Teja. As chronicled in Hikayat Hang Tuah and other sources, Tun Teja was a beautiful princess from Pahang. Sultan Mahmud heard of her beauty and sent Tuah as his emissary to present to her his royal proposal of marriage. Upon meeting Tuah, Tun Teja fell in love with him, and in some versions Tuah reciprocated her feelings. Ultimately, Tuah placed his loyalty to Sultan Mahmud above his personal emotions.

The Puteri Gunung Ledang film acknowledges the existence of Tun Teja, who in that version is already Sultan Mahmud's wife and the mother of the crown prince Raja Ahmad. The musical omits Tun Teja completely.

== Productions ==
The musical first ran at the Istana Budaya from February 10 to 24, 2006. The enthusiastic response both critically and commercially lead to a second season being announced before the first season had been completed. The second season ran at the same venue from August 6 to 21, 2006, and featured supporting cast replacements, slight changes in the set-up and dialogue along with more sophisticated props.

The musical had an international run when it was performed in Esplanade Theatres on the Bay, Singapore from November 24 to 26, 2006 in conjunction with Pesta Raya (Malay Festival of Arts). The tickets were declared sold-out a month prior to the performance, prompting the organisers to create an extra matinee performance on the November 25, 2006.

A special performance of the musical was staged in April 2008 to celebrate the opening of the East Ledang resort in Nusajaya, Johor. The original ensemble performed the show, with the understudies taking over the principal roles originated by Tiara Jacquelina and Stephen Rahman-Hughes.

The musical had its third run at the Istana Budaya from February 6 to 21, 2009.

== Cast ==
Gusti Putri (Tiara Jacquelina) decides to leave her home to find Tuah. (Photo by Wan Izhar)

=== Season 1 (10-24 Feb 2006) ===
Main cast

- Tiara Jacquelina as Gusti Puteri Retno Dumilah
- Stephen Rahman-Hughes as Hang Tuah
- Adlin Aman Ramlie as Sultan Mahmud
- AC Mizal as Gusti Adipati Handaya Ningrat
- Sukania Venugopal as Bayan
- Hamzah Tahir as Bendahara
- Yalal Chin (BCM) as Patih
- Mohammed Afif Halim as Raja Ahmad

=== Season 2 (6-21 Aug 2006) ===
Main cast

- Tiara Jacquelina as Gusti Puteri Retno Dumilah
- Stephen Rahman-Hughes as Hang Tuah
- Adlin Aman Ramlie as Sultan Mahmud
- AC Mizal as Gusti Adipati Handaya Ningrat
- Ida Mariana as Bayan
- Firdee Akassya Rosli as Bendahara
- Yalal Chin (BCM) as Patih
- Martin Haniff Sargeant and Mohammed Afif Halim as Raja Ahmad

Understudy cast

- Lily Zarina as Gusti Puteri Retno Dumilah
- Firdee Akassya Rosli as Hang Tuah
- Jeffry Haikel as Sultan Mahmud
- Mohammad Faizal Mohd Ali as Adipati Handaya Ningrat
- Norenshah Sahari as Bayan
- Ismarizal Zulamran as Bendahara
- Azrul Zaidi as Afiq

=== Singapore (24-26 Nov 2006) ===
- Tiara Jacquelina as Gusti Puteri Retno Dumilah
- Stephen Rahman-Hughes as Hang Tuah
- Adlin Aman Ramlie as Sultan Mahmud
- AC Mizal as Gusti Adipati Handaya Ningrat
- Ida Mariana as Bayan

=== Season 3 (6-21 Feb 2009) ===
Main cast

- Tiara Jacquelina as Gusti Puteri Retno Dumilah
- Stephen Rahman-Hughes as Hang Tuah
- Adlin Aman Ramlie as Sultan Mahmud
- AC Mizal as Gusti Adipati Handaya Ningrat
- Ida Mariana as Bayan
- Chedd Eddie Yusoff as Bendahara
- Yalal Chin as Patih
- Mohammed Afif Halim and Muhammad Haziq Fitrie as Raja Ahmad

== Songs ==
Director and writer Zahim Albakri was influenced by the musicals of Rodgers and Hammerstein, opting for "rousing numbers, a full chorus performing lavish song and dance spectacles, and colourful costumes and props". Composer Dick Lee found inspiration in Bali, Java and among his own Peranakan heritage. A live cast recording of the songs from the show was released on CD in August 2006. A few songs were omitted from the album, all of them featuring the vocals of Sukania Venugopal.

Act I

- Suatu Hari Nanti (Someday) – Adipati, Patih, Putri, Bayan, Ensemble Majaphit
- Moga Temui Cinta (Hoping to Find Love) – Putri, Bayan
- Kemasyhuran (Fame) – Ensemble Majapahit
- Jiwa Abadi (Eternal Soul) – Putri
- Jiwa Abadi reprise – Putri
- Tinta Dewa (Lord's Command) – Bayan, Ensemble Kraton
- Di Puncak Tertinggi (On the Highest Peak) – Hang Tuah, Putri
- Suatu Hari Nanti reprise – Ensemble
- Dewa Perang (Lord of War) – Adipati, Ensemble Prajurit
- Hajatmu Kubantu (I Will Aid Thee) – Adipati, Sultan
- Keranamu Kekasih (For You, Beloved) – Hang Tuah
- Katakan Hadirmu Kerana Cinta solo (Say You are Here Because of Love) – Putri
- Tinta Dewa - Bayan dan Suara Ramai (Lord's Command - Bayan and the People) – Bayan, Ensemble Kraton
- Moga Temui Cinta duet – Bayan, Putri
- Suatu Hari Nanti duet – Adipati, Patih
- Moga Temui Cinta solo – Bayan

Act II

- Melaka Terbilang (Glorious Malacca) – Ensemble Malacca
- Di Puncak Tertinggi solo – Hang Tuah
- Di Puncak Tertinggi duet – Hang Tuah, Putri
- Cinta Atau Setia (Love or Loyalty) – Hang Tuah
- Titah Sultan (The Sultan's Command) – Sultan, Ensemble Malacca
- Melaka Terbilang reprise – Ensemble Malacca
- Mendaki Gunung (Climbing the Mountain) - (Dance) Hang Tuah, Rombongan Tujuh (Seven Delegates)
- Putri Chant/Tinta Dewa – Putri, Ensemble
- Keranamu Kekasih duet – Hang Tuah, Putri
- Katakan Hadirmu Kerana Cinta reprise – Putri
- Tujuh Syarat Agong (The Seven Conditions) – Ensemble Nenek Kebayan
- Melaka Bercelaru (Malacca in Turmoil) – Hang Tuah, Putri, Ensemble Malacca
- Cinta Atau Setia solo – Hang Tuah
- Curtain call: Suatu Hari Nanti/Keranamu Kekasih

== Response ==
The musical was critically and commercially successful, earning praise from critics for the reinterpretation of the legend of Mount Ledang.

== Awards ==
- 5th Annual BOH Cameronian Arts Awards 2006
  - Best Director (Theatre) — Zahim Albakri and Adlin Aman Ramlie
  - Best Lighting Design (Theatre) — Mac Chan
  - Best Set Design (Theatre) — Raja Malek
  - Best Music and Sound Design (Theatre) — Dick Lee
  - Primavera Best Costume Design (Theatre) — Akma Suriati Awang
  - Best Actor in a Supporting Role (Theatre) — Sukania Venugopal
  - Best Original Script, Bahasa Malaysia (Theatre) — Adlin Aman Ramlie

== See also ==
- Puteri Gunong Ledang, 1961 film
- Hikayat Hang Tuah
