= Hang Nadim =

15th-century Laksamana of Malacca Sultanate

- Born: Pulau Besar, Malacca
- Resting place: Bintan, Riau Islands
- Occupation: Laksamana
- Era: Malacca Sultanate
- Spouse: Tun Emas Jiwa
- Children: Tun Mat Ali
- Parents: Hang Jebat (father); Dang Wangi (mother)

Hang Nadim (Jawi: هڠ نديم) was a warrior of the Malacca Sultanate during the Portuguese occupation of Melaka (modern day Malacca). Nadim was appointed laksamana (admiral) of Sultan Mahmud Shah's forces that harassed the Portuguese trade colonies from 1511 to 1526.

== Family and career ==
Hang Nadim was the son of Malaccan warrior and insurrectionist Hang Jebat and his wife, Dang Wangi. According to the Sejarah Melayu (Malay Annals), at the time Hang Jebat was killed by the Laksamana Hang Tuah, Hang Nadim was still in the womb of his mother Dang Wangi, who was seven months pregnant. Two months later, Dang Wangi gave birth to Jebat's son, the Sultan Mahmud Shah ordered Hang Tuah to throw the baby into the sea. Instead, Hang Tuah instructed Dang Wangi with the baby to take refuge in Singapura (Temasek), fearing that she might be sentenced to death by Sultan due to the transgressions committed by her husband. Hang Nadim was later adopted by Hang Tuah.

He eventually married Tun Mas Jiwa (also known as Tun Emas Jiwa), who was Hang Tuah’s daughter. The union between Laksamana Hang Nadim and Tun Emas Jiwa produced a son named Tun Mat Ali.

=== Appointment to rank of laksamana ===
After Laksamana Khoja Hassan was dismissed from his position for slandering the Bendahara Tun Mutahir and banished from Malacca, Nadim was appointed the new laksamana in 1509 to replace him. In 1516, Nadim attacked Malacca with the hope of recapturing it from the Portuguese, but the attack was unsuccessful. Nadim proved his leadership and heroism by defeating the Portuguese attacks on the Bintan Regency and Kopak. His repeated attacks on the Portuguese weakened their fighting spirit and badly damaged their ability to trade with Malacca. During this time, his reputation grew, and he became famous with the Malay peoples. Nadim assisted Mahmud Shah in two attempts to recover the throne, in 1519 and 1524. Also in 1524, Nadim besieged Malacca in the hope of preventing food from reaching the town. The siege was broken, however, when the Portuguese were relieved by reinforcements from Goa.

== Background ==
After the 1511 fall of Malacca to the Portuguese, exiled Sultan Mahmud Shah of the royal house of Melaka, withdrew from Teloh Naming to Ulu Muar. His people eventually settled in Pagoh and Bentayan. Mahmud Shah and his descendants founded the Johor Sultanate. (Note: the Johor Sultanate was the basis of the much larger Johor-Pahang-Riau-Lingga empire to come later. This empire comprised Johor, the Riau Islands, Pahang and all those parts of the old Malacca Sultanate which had not been occupied by the Portuguese.) Although Malacca had fallen to the Portuguese, Mahmud Shah and his son, Sultan Ahmad, had continued to attack the Portuguese in Malacca, up to 1526. Mahmud died in the Kampar Regency (modern Sumatra) in 1528 and was known posthumously as Marhum Kampar.

== In legend and popular culture ==
Another version of Hang Nadim appeared as a legendary boy in a chapter of the Sejarah Melayu (or the Malay Annals).

In the Sejarah Melayu (the Malay Annals), the boy who saved the fishing village of Temasek from the attacking swordfishes is not given a name. The name Hang Nadim was only given to a character in the story after later adaptions of the legend made its way into popular culture. This Nadim character appeared in a different chapter and is unrelated to the story of the boy who saved Temasek. It is mentioned in the traditional accounts that the swordfish attacks were the result of a curse because the reigning Maharajah had ordered the death of a pious man, Tun Jana Khateb, from Pasei.

In the Annals, the Raja plans to counter the attacks by having his countrymen stand in the sea to form a human barrier of legs along the shores of Temasek to protect the area. The number of swordfish, however, proved too numerous, and the plan only caused more lives to be lost. After that, Hang Nadim came forward and advised the Maharajah to build a barrier with banana stems instead. The effort was successful as the swordfishes' snouts were trapped by stems of the barricade. (Note: According to common belief, the place called Tanjong Pagar in modern-day Singapore takes its name from this barricade. In the Malay language, tanjong pagar means "cape of gates".) The Maharajah became furious because he had been publicly outwitted by a boy, so he hired assassins to murder the boy. Nadim lived on top of a hill. That night, the assassins murdered him in his sleep and all of his blood flowed into the hill. The name Bukit Merah is today called the "Red Hill".

== Legacy ==
- The Royal Malaysian Navy's Laksamana Class corvette KD Laksamana Hang Nadim (F134), is named after him.
- The Hang Nadim International Airport in Batam, Indonesia is named after him.
- Film Director Omar Rojik directed an adaption of Hang Nadim's story as told in the Malay Annals; the film is entitled "Singapura Dilanggar Todak" and was produced in 1962. This film ties together both the story of Tun Jana Khateb's visit and execution in Temasek, and Hang Nadim's later heroic act in saving the people from the attacks of the swordfish.
