= Hikayat Hang Tuah =

Malaysian hikayat, or folktale, about Malaccan warrior Hang Tuah

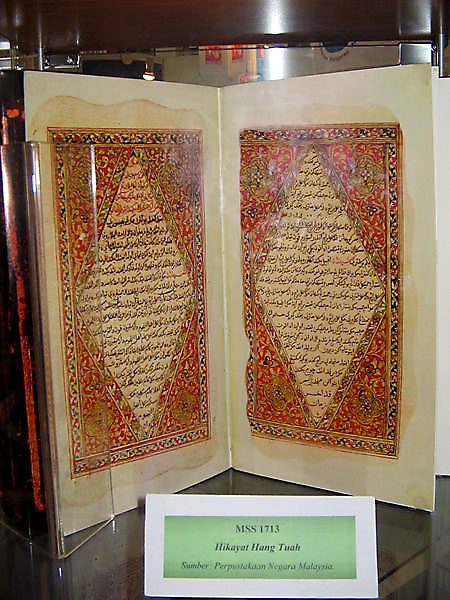
A copy of the Hang Tuah Saga in display.

Hikayat Hang Tuah (Jawi: حکاية هڠ تواه) is a Malay work of literature that tells the tale of the historical figure of a Malay warrior Hang Tuah and his four warrior friends – Hang Jebat, Hang Kasturi, Hang Lekir and Hang Lekiu – who lived during the height of the Sultanate of Malacca in the 15th century.

The author is unknown and it has been accepted that it was written and compiled by several different authors from the 17th century to the early 18th century. The writer Kassim Ahmad argued that each writer aimed to adapt the tale to suit the society in which they lived during that specific period of time. Hikayat Hang Tuah was first published by the Methodist Publishing House, Singapore in 1908 and was listed in UNESCO's Memory of the World Programme International Register in 2001.

== Story ==
The most memorable chapter in the work concerns a duel between Hang Tuah and his closest friend, Hang Jebat. Hang Tuah was falsely accused of adultery with one of his king's maids by his jealous rivals. Upon hearing the accusation, the king ordered Hang Tuah killed, without further investigation of the alleged offense. Hang Tuah was secretly saved, however, by his executioner, the Bendahara.

Hang Jebat was aware that Hang Tuah was being unjustly punished and in a show of support and deep loyalty for his friend, revolted against the sultan. The sultan's forces were unable to suppress Hang Jebat.

The sultan later came to realize that Hang Tuah was innocent, and immediately regretted sentencing Hang Tuah to death. The Bendahara then told the sultan that Hang Tuah was still alive, and that only Hang Tuah could suppress Hang Jebat's rebellion. Hang Tuah was immediately recalled and given amnesty. After seven days of fighting, Hang Tuah managed to kill Hang Jebat.

However, according to the Malay Annals, it was Hang Kasturi that fought with Hang Tuah instead of Hang Jebat.

== Translations ==
An English language translation of Hikayat Hang Tuah, titled The Epic of Hang Tuah, was translated by Muhammad Haji Salleh, edited by Rosemary Robson-McKillop, and published by Institut Terjemahan Negara Malaysia in 2010.

A Chinese language translation of Hikayat Hang Tuah, titled 杭·杜阿传奇 ('The Legend of Hang Tuah'), was translated by Huang Yuanhuan (黄元焕) and published by Intelligentsia Book Station in 2006.

A Hawaiian language translation of this hikayat titled Ke Kaao o Lakamana ('The Tale of the Laksamana') was serialized by American minister Walter M. Gibson in his own bilingual English-Hawaiian newspaper Nuhou from November 1873 to April 1874; Gibson had learned Malay during his time in Java.

== Significance and controversies ==
Malay culture holds the Hang Tuah legends in extremely high regard. In fact, one of the hottest debates in Malay literature centers on the duel between Hang Tuah and Hang Jebat. Hang Tuah is a symbol of absolute loyalty to a ruler while Hang Jebat symbolizes freedom and justice. Hence, there is the question of who is right. Though it is generally perceived that there were five friends, there is doubt that Hang Lekir and Hang Lekiu are indeed two different persons. In the Jawi script, the letter "ﺭ" (ra) and the letter "ﻭ" (wow) look similar and those were part of the nouns "Leki-r" and "Leki-u". Due to the similarity, the differentiation of Lekir and Lekiu might be due to mistranslation.

Apart from that, Hikayat Hang Tuah is highly critical of the Javanese and deals with the rivalry between the Malay Sultanate of Malacca and the Javanese Majapahit Empire. In the literary work, many of the crooks and the villains were from Majapahit or Java. The king of Majapahit is depicted as an indecisive person and Majapahit's grand vizier, Gajah Mada, as sly, cunning and unsympathetic.

== See also ==
- Legend of Puteri Gunung Ledang
- Puteri Gunong Ledang, 1961 film
- Puteri Gunung Ledang, 2004 film
  - Puteri Gunung Ledang (musical), musical based on the 2004 film
- List of Hikayat
