= Malay Annals =

15th–16th-century literary work

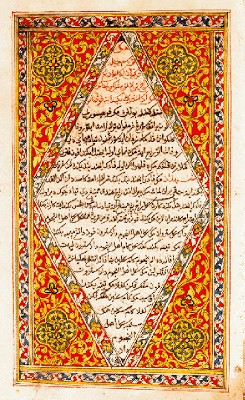
The frontispiece of a Jawi edition of the Malay Annals

The Malay Annals (Malay: Sejarah Melayu, Jawi: سجاره ملايو), originally titled Sulalatus Salatin (Genealogy of Kings), is a literary work that gives a romanticised history of the origin, evolution and destruction of the Malacca Sultanate. The work, composed in the 17th century by court historians, draws from earlier accounts prior to that century, is considered one of the finest literary and historical works in the Malay language.

The original text has undergone numerous changes, with the oldest surviving version from 1612, through the rewriting effort commissioned by the then regent of Johor, Raja Abdullah. It was originally written in Classical Malay on traditional paper in old Jawi script, but today exists in 32 different manuscripts, including those in Rumi script. Notwithstanding some of its mystical contents, historians have looked at the text as a primary source of information on past events verifiable by other historical sources, in the Malay world. In 2001, the Malay Annals was listed on UNESCO's Memory of the World International Register. Today, more than 30 manuscript copies survive, but the 1612 copy is believed to contain the earliest changes to the original text.

== Compilation history ==
There are a large number of manuscripts of the Malay Annals and its related texts. The manuscripts are scattered over libraries in various countries: in Malaysia (Dewan Bahasa dan Pustaka), in Indonesia (Jakarta, Museum Pusat), in the United Kingdom (mainly in London), in the Netherlands (Leiden). Not all of these manuscripts have the same value; some are fragmentary or otherwise incomplete; others are just copies of existing manuscripts, and some are copies of the printed text. A version of the Malay Annals dated 1612, acquired by Sir Stamford Raffles and coded Raffles MS no.18 or Raffles Manuscript 18, is considered the oldest and the most faithful to the original.

There is a possibility that Raffles MS no.18 version has developed from a genealogical king-list complete with the periods of reigns and dates. This king-list was subsequently enlarged by various stories and historically relevant material which was inserted in suitable places, but at the same time it lost its dates. Unknown Malay texts titled Soelalet Essalatina or Sulalatu'l-Salatina, that is referred to by Petrus Van der Vorm and François Valentijn in their works Collectanea Malaica Vocabularia ("Collection of Malay Vocabulary") (1677) and Oud En New Oost Indien ("A Short History of East Indies") (1726) respectively, could have existed in the form of a king-list.

However, the introduction of Raffles MS no.18 describes that the manuscript originates from another manuscript known as the Hikayat Melayu, which may trace its origin to the time of the Malacca Sultanate (1400–1511). The manuscript was brought together when the last ruler, Mahmud Shah, fled the Portuguese invasion in 1511 to Kampar. In 1536, during the Portuguese attack on Johor Lama, where the exiled sultan established his base, the manuscript was seized by the Portuguese soldiers and brought to Goa, Portuguese India. Decades later, in the early 17th century, the manuscript was returned to Johor from Goa by a nobleman identified as Orang Kaya Sogoh. However, historian Abdul Samad Ahmad provides an alternative view, suggesting that the manuscript was returned from Gowa, Sulawesi instead of Goa, India. His argument is based on the fact that during Malacca's time as an important regional entrepôt, it had established strong trading and diplomatic ties with regional kingdoms, including Gowa, and some copies of the Hikayat Melayu could have been spread to Sulawesi long before the arrival of Portuguese. Another view, from William Linehan, tried to argue that Goa ought to read guha or gua, and that the reference was to Gua, a place located north of Kuala Lipis in Pahang, where a copy of the Malay Annals had been preserved and later brought to Johor and edited there in 1612.

On 13 May 1612, during the reign of Sultan Alauddin Riayat Shah III of Johor, the regent of Johor, Yang di-Pertuan Di Hilir Raja Abdullah also known as Raja Bongsu, had commissioned the rewriting and compilation work of the manuscript to the bendahara Tun Sri Lanang. In 1613, the Johorean capital, Batu Sawar was sacked by the Aceh Sultanate and Alauddin Riayat Shah, and his entire court, including Tun Sri Lanang and Raja Abdullah was captured and exiled to Aceh. Although Tun Sri Lanang managed to complete the bulk of the Malay Annals in Johor, he completed his work during his captivity in Aceh.

In 1821, the English translation of Raffles MS no.18 by John Leyden was posthumously published in London. It included a foreword by Raffles himself, introducing the text and explaining its relevance in highlighting the potential congeniality of Malayans to British rule. It was then followed by the edited version in Malay by Abdullah Abdul Kadir, published in Singapore in 1831 and the compilation by Édouard Dulaurier in 1849. In 1915, William Shellabear's edition was published. It is considered as a hybrid long text, primarily based on Abdullah and Dulaurier's version but containing extracts from other texts as well. It was then followed by another translation of Raffles MS no.18, this time by Richard Olaf Winstedt in 1938. Another important version, compiled by Malaysian historian Abdul Samad Ahmad in 1979, uses the original title of the text, Sulalatus Salatin. Abdul Samad's compilation was based on three manuscripts that he named as A, B and C, kept in the library of Dewan Bahasa dan Pustaka, Kuala Lumpur. Two of the manuscripts, alternatively named as MS86 and MS86a by Dewan Bahasa dan Pustaka, were later referred in the nomination form submitted for UNESCO's Memory of the World International Register.

== Contents ==
The Malay Annals is historical literature written in the form of narrative-prose with its main theme being lauding the greatness and superiority of Malacca. The narration, while seemingly relating the story of the reign of the sultans of Malacca until the destruction of the sultanate by the Portuguese in 1511 and beyond, deals with a core issue of Malay statehood and historiography, the relationship between rulers and ruled. The Malay Annals are prefaced by a celebration of the greatness of God, the Prophet Muhammad and his companions. They begin with a genealogical account of the first sultan of Malacca who is said to be descended from Raja Iskandar Zulkarnain. The Malay Annals cover the founding of Malacca and its rise to power; its relationship with neighbouring kingdoms and distant countries; the advent of Islam and its spread in Malacca and the region as a whole; the history of the royalty in the region including battles won or lost, marriage ties and diplomatic relationships; the administrative hierarchy that ruled Malacca; the greatness of its rulers and administrators, including the bendahara Tun Perak and laksamana, Hang Tuah. The Malay Annals conclude with the account of Malacca's defeat by the Portuguese forces in 1511, resulting not only in the downfall of Malacca, but also in the eventual re-emergence of the Malacca-modelled sultanates in other parts of the region, including Johor, Perak and Pahang.

=== Notable stories ===
- The genealogical origin of Sang Sapurba from Raja Iskandar Zulkarnain, his miraculous appearance in Bukit Seguntang, and the oath he made with Demang Lebar Daun, the native chief of Palembang.
- The adventure of Sang Nila Utama from Palembang to Temasek, and the founding of Singapura. The Malay Annals also describes how Singapura got its name.
- The legend of Badang, a man with an unusual strength who was said to have demonstrated a feat of strength in Sri Rana Wikrama's court.
- The story of Hang Nadim, the saviour of Singapura when the coastline of the kingdom was infested by numerous fierce swordfish.
- The fall of Singapura to Majapahit, and the flight of the last ruler, Sri Iskandar Shah. He lost the island kingdom after falsely accusing and punishing one of his concubines for adultery. Her father, Sang Rajuna Tapa, who was also an official in Sri Iskandar Shah's court, acted upon his family's holdings, changed sides and opened the way for a successful Majapahit invasion that ousted Sri Iskandar Shah.
- The founding of Malacca. The last ruler of Singapura, Sri Iskandar Shah fled north and later founded Malacca and introduced court ceremonies, laws and regulations which became the basis of Malacca's administration. The Malay Annals also describes how Malacca got its name.
- The story of Tun Perak, the most revered Bendahara of Malacca. The Malay Annals recount his career, from a noble headman of Klang to the second most powerful man in Malacca's court.
- The saga of Hang Tuah and his companions. According to the Hikayat Hang Tuah, Hang Tuah killed one of his companions Hang Jebat in a duel that took place at the Istana of Malacca. The Shellabear and Winstedt's versions of the Malay Annals on the other hand record that instead of Hang Jebat, it was Hang Kasturi that was killed by Hang Tuah.
- The Legend of Puteri Gunung Ledang. It recounts the story of a legendary fairy princess living on top of Mount Ophir, Johor during the reign of Mahmud Shah and was once wooed by the sultan.
- The Portuguese conquest of Malacca. According to the Malay Annals, the Portuguese forces, led by Afonso de Albuquerque, launched a second assault on Malacca during the reign of Ahmad Shah, the first being repulsed by Bendahara Tun Mutahir. The assault on the city was great on the first day, and on the second, Malacca fell to the Portuguese. However, according to Portuguese records, Albuquerque's assault on Malacca started on 25 July 1511, and lasted for 15 days before the city was captured on 15 August. Portuguese records, especially the ones written by Albuquerque's son, mention that the Malaccan commander-in-chief, Ahmad Shah, died in battle. However, in the Malay Annals' account, he survived the battle and retreated to a safer place, only to be put to death by his father.

== Significance ==
The Malay Annals have had a great influence on the history, culture, and development of Malay civilisation, which confronted major cultural transformation through the centuries. Through courtly chronicles like the Malay Annals, the Malaccan tradition developed in the 15th century was transmitted onwards and fostered a Malay identity. These chronicles became an important source of instruction for Malacca's successor states, as they enshrined the sanctity and authority of a Malay ruler (daulat), in his role in maintaining the cohesion of the realm, and legitimized the increasingly absolutist governments these states adopted in the competitive environment. The documents were used by Johor to promote the idea that Malacca and Johor were the centre of Malay culture, during competition with Malay polities in Sumatra. Tun Sri Lanang wrote as follows at the beginning of the Malay Annals:

The royal command of His Majesty, "That we ask the Bendahara for the hikayat be produced in the nature of the events and speech of Malay kings and their customs and traditions as well; so it would known by all our descendants who succeed us, remembered by them; therupon will they benefit from it.

The Malay Annals and other Malay manuscripts remain the subject of study for the 'people who succeeded' from the time the works were produced.

== Translations ==
There are a number of English translations of the Malay Annals, the first of which is by John Leyden published in 1821 with an introduction by Sir Stamford Raffles. Another one by C.C. Brown was published in 1952. The Singaporean historian Hsu Yun Tsiao translated the Malay Annals into the chinese version (马来纪年).

== See also ==
- Gangga Negara, an ancient Malay kingdom that is mentioned in the Malay Annals.
- Kota Gelanggi, an ancient Malay city that is mentioned in the Malay Annals.
