= The Secret Life of Nora =

- Music: Weng Onn San
- Lyrics: Jerome Kugan, Alfian Sa’at & Mamat Khalid
- Book: Raymond Miranda
- Premiere: September 29, 2011: Istana Budaya, Kuala Lumpur

The Secret Life of Nora is a Malaysian musical produced by Enfiniti (M) Sdn Bhd, with Tiara Jacquelina as Executive Producer, story by Raymond Miranda, directed by Steven Dexter and choreographed by Pat Ibrahim. The show is an adaptation of the 1965 Shaw Brothers film Nora Zain - Agen Wanita 001.

== Production ==
The production was staged at the Malaysian National Theatre, Istana Budaya from 29 September - 16 October 2011 in Bahasa Malaysia and English.

== Synopsis ==
Nora (Tiara Jacquelina), the prima donna of a Malaysian cabaret, is tricked into becoming a spy to help uncover a mysterious plot by villain Mr J (Aznil Nawawi). Along the way, she falls in love with Roger Foss (Ryan Silverman), an international agent who helps transform her from Drama Queen to a skilled undercover spy.

== Music ==
The Secret Life Nora features an original score, music composed by Weng Onn San, lyrics written by Jerome Kugan with Alfian Sa'at and Mamat Khalid, arranged and directed by Roslan Aziz.

The original cast recording was released as a digital download on April 28, 2020.

=== Track listing ===
Original Cast Recording
No.	Title	Performer(s)	Length
1	Siapa Dia	Tiara Jacquelina	4:05
2	Pancaran Cahaya (Part 1)	Tiara Jacquelina, Stephanie Van Driesen	2:42
3	Pancaran Cahaya (Part 2)	Tiara Jacquelina	2:29
4	A Woman Makes A Better Spy	Ryan Silverman	3:07
5	Kau Yang Menulis	Stephanie Van Driesen	2:53
6	Siapa Mahu Menjadi Bintang	Aaron Khaled, Nadia Aqilah	3:35
7	A Twinkle In The Dark	Tiara Jacquelina, Ryan Silverman	3:56
8	Kalau Hati Dah Berpaut	Adibah Noor	2:58
9	Layakkah Aku	Tiara Jacquelina	4:32
10	Not Too Late To Start	Ryan Silverman	3:15
11	Kau Dan Aku	Aznil Nawawi	3:36

== Casts ==
- Tiara Jacquelina as Nora
- Ryan Silverman as Roger Foss
- Aznil Nawawi as Mr J
- Adibah Noor as Khatijah
- Tony Eusoff as Farouk
- Aaron Khaled as Sharif
- Stephanie Van Driesen as Betty
- Mamat Khalid as Hong Kong

Ensemble / Company:

- Suhaili Micheline
- Iedil Dzuhrie Alaudin
- Nadia Aqilah
- Nasz Sally

== Video-On-Demand ==
The Secret Life Of Nora is the first Malaysian show to be streamed online

During the Movement Control Order (MCO) for COVID-19 in March - April 2020, 40% of the collections for the streaming of The Secret Life of Nora on their Vimeo On Demand channel was channelled to MaybankHeart's The People Campaign is a relief fund for the most at-risk communities.

== Awards ==
The Secret Life of Nora won several awards at the 9th BOH Cameronian Arts Awards 2012.

- Kakiseni Audience Choice Awards for Musical Theatre
- Best Original Book And/Or Lyrics (Raymond Miranda, Mamat Khalid, Elliot Davis, Steven Dexter and Alfian Sa’at)
- Best Performance In A Supporting Role (Stephanie Van Driesen)
