= Hang Jebat =

Malay warrior

- هڠ جبت
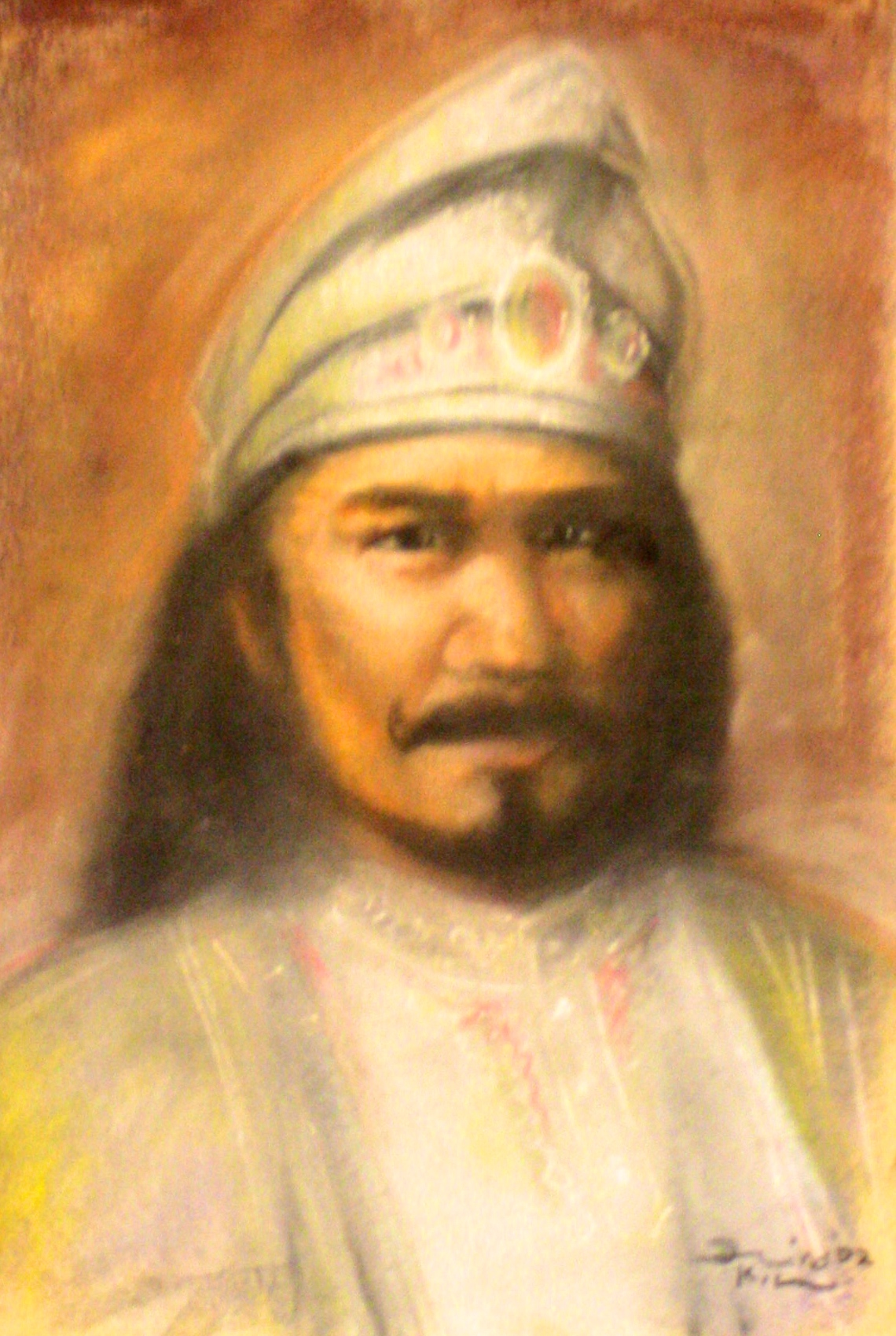
- Artist's depiction of Hang Jebat, Malacca Sultanate Palace Museum
- Born: c. 1400; Malacca Sultanate
- Occupation: Warrior
- Era: Malacca Sultanate
- Spouse: Dang Wangi
- Children: Hang Nadim

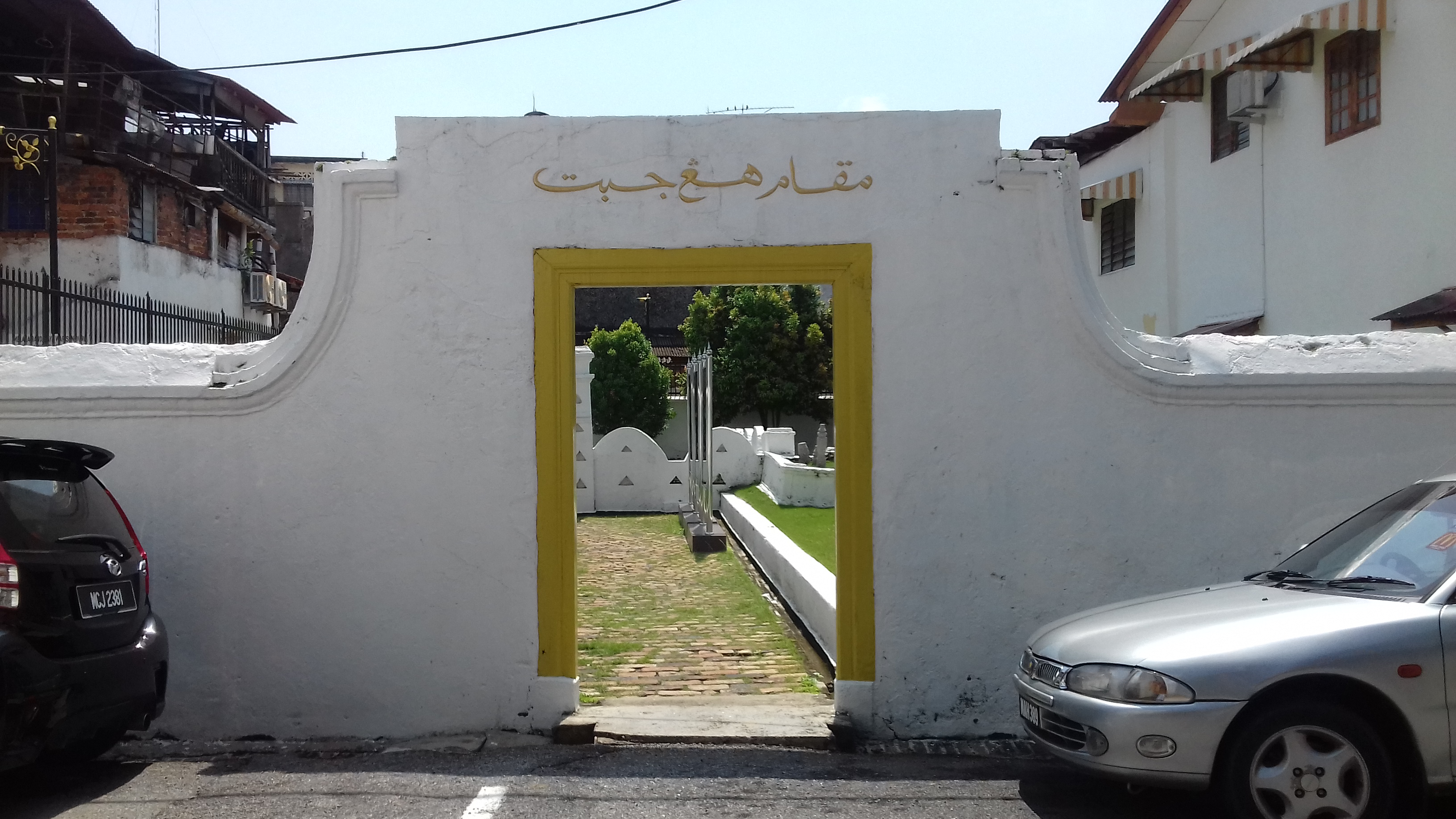
Hang Jebat Mausoleum in Malacca.

Hang Jebat (Jawi: هڠ جبت; born c. 1400) was the closest companion of the legendary Malaccan hero Hang Tuah. Regarded in Malaysia as one of the greatest silat exponents in history, he is well known for his vengeful rebellion against the Malacca Sultan and final duel with Hang Tuah, who he swore to avenge after he was wrongfully punished by the Sultan. In contrast to Tuah's undying loyalty to the sultanate, Jebat is most remembered for his fierce defiance against unjust authority.

== Biography ==
After Hang Tuah was sentenced to death, Hang Jebat was conferred the coveted Taming Sari kris, a weapon formerly used by Hang Tuah. Believing that Hang Tuah was unjustly murdered by the sultan he served, Hang Jebat turned against the ruler to avenge his friend's death. No one knew that the bendahara (chief minister) went against the royal decree and hid Hang Tuah in a remote area.

With the kris in his possession, Hang Jebat was undefeatable and there was not one person in the palace who was capable of killing him. Hang Jebat's revenge allegedly became a palace killing spree or furious rebellion against the sultan (sources differ as to what actually occurred). It remains consistent, however, that Hang Jebat wreaked havoc onto the royal court, and the sultan was unable to stop him, as none of the warriors dared to challenge the more ferocious and skilled Hang Jebat.

After learning from the bendahara that Hang Tuah was still alive, the sultan had him recall the warrior and gave him full amnesty. The sultan then ordered Hang Tuah to kill Hang Jebat. Being unquestionably loyal to the ruler, Hang Tuah obeyed the sultan's bidding and went on to challenge Hang Jebat. After fighting in a battle that lasted for seven days, Hang Tuah eventually managed to reclaim the Taming Sari by tricking Hang Jebat. Although stabbed by Tuah, Hang Jebat bandaged his wounds and ran amok in the city square for three days, killing thousands of people before retreating to Tuah's house and dying in his friend's arms.

Hang Jebat's famous quote during the fight was "Raja adil raja disembah, raja zalim raja disanggah" meaning "A fair king is a king saluted, a tyrant king is a king disputed." This went against Tuah's philosophy of loyalty without question.

After the fight, the sultan ordered his men to tear down, burn and throw the ashes of the house into the sea. Two months later, when a lady of the bendahara's retinue, Dang Wangi gave birth to Jebat's son, the sultan ordered Hang Tuah to throw the baby into the sea as well. Instead, the laksamana entrusted the child, Hang Nadim, to the bendahara. The child was then taken to Singapura where he was raised.

== Namesakes ==
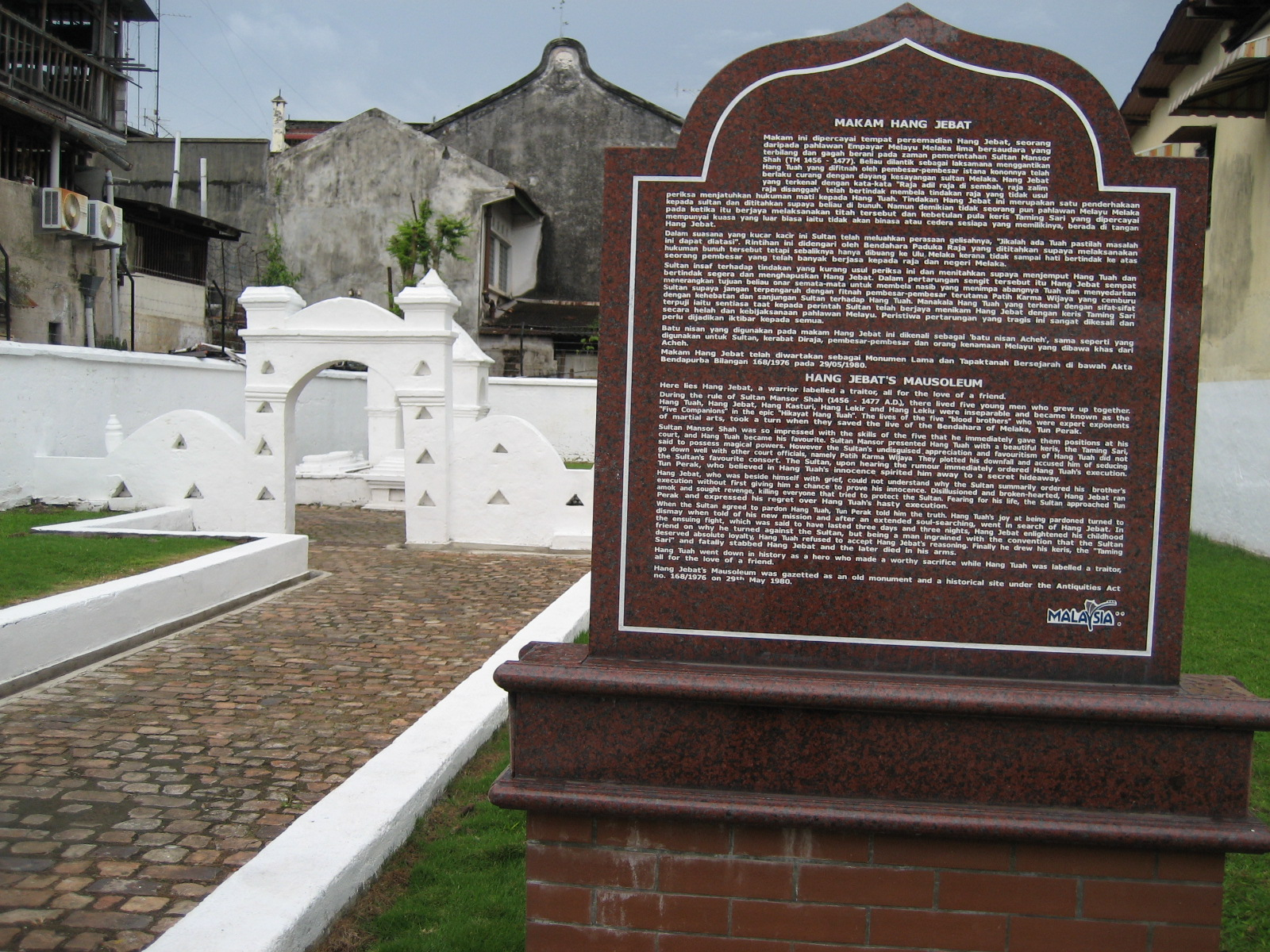
Gravestone of legendary Malaccan Hang Jebat.

KD Jebat (FFG29), a Lekiu-class frigate in the Royal Malaysian Navy, is named after him. The decommissioned frigate KD Rahmat was to be called KD Hang Jebat, but engine problems during building trials caused the navy to change her name to Rahmat. One of the oldest engines that pulls the trains along the Singapore-Malaysia rail route is also named after him.

In Malaysia, there is Hang Jebat Stadium, a multi purpose stadium located in Krubong and Paya Rumput, Malacca.

In Singapore, there exists a minor road off Portsdown Avenue named "Jalan Hang Jebat" and a namesake mosque, Masjid Hang Jebat at the road's end.

In Indonesia, there is a road named "Jalan Hang Jebat" in Batam and Pekanbaru.

== In popular culture ==
In 1965, Talivishen Malaysia produced a one-scene drama surrounding the figure titled Terajidi Hang Jebat ("The Tragedy of Hang Jebat") directed by Aziz Wok for Merdeka Day, with Rahim Razali portraying Jebat and Bidin Subari as Tuah.

== See also ==
- Hang Jebat Mosque
- Hang Jebat Stadium
