= Ahmad Shah of Malacca =

Sultan of the Malacca Sultanate

Ahmad Shah
- 9th Sultan of Malacca
- Reign: 1511–1513 (de facto)
- Predecessor: Mahmud Shah
- Successor: Mahmud Shah
- Died: 1513
- Cause of death: assassination
- House: House of Malacca
- Father: Mahmud Shah
- Mother: Tun Teja
- Religion: Sunni Islam

Sultan Ahmad Shah ibni Almarhum Sultan Mahmud Shah (died 1513) was the de facto Sultan of Malacca from 1511 to 1513.

The son of Sultan Mahmud Shah, Ahmad Shah's rule began in 1511 when his father stepped aside, and ended in 1513 when he died during the kingdom's war with Portugal. His religious advisor was Sadar Jahan, who accompanied him to face the Portuguese attack that destroyed the city in 1511. His father stabbed him after failing to conquer Malacca. He was succeeded by his father.

Sultan Ahmad Shah was also involved in the myth of the Mount Ledang princess, where the princess had requested from the Sultan of Malacca, among other things, a bowl of the sultan's young son's, and hence Ahmad's, blood in order to marry her.

There is also another account regarding how Ahmad Shah was in charge despite not being officially appointed as ruler to cover up for his father's escape with Tun Teja alongside Hang Tuah to the Indian Ocean.

== See also ==
- Sultanate of Malacca
- Malay Annals

Ahmad Shah of Malacca House of Malacca Died: 1513
Regnal titles
Preceded by Mahmud Shah	Sultan of Malacca; 1511-1513	Succeeded by Position abolished
