= Hang Tuah's Well =

Water well in Duyong, Malacca, Malaysia

- Perigi Hang Tuah
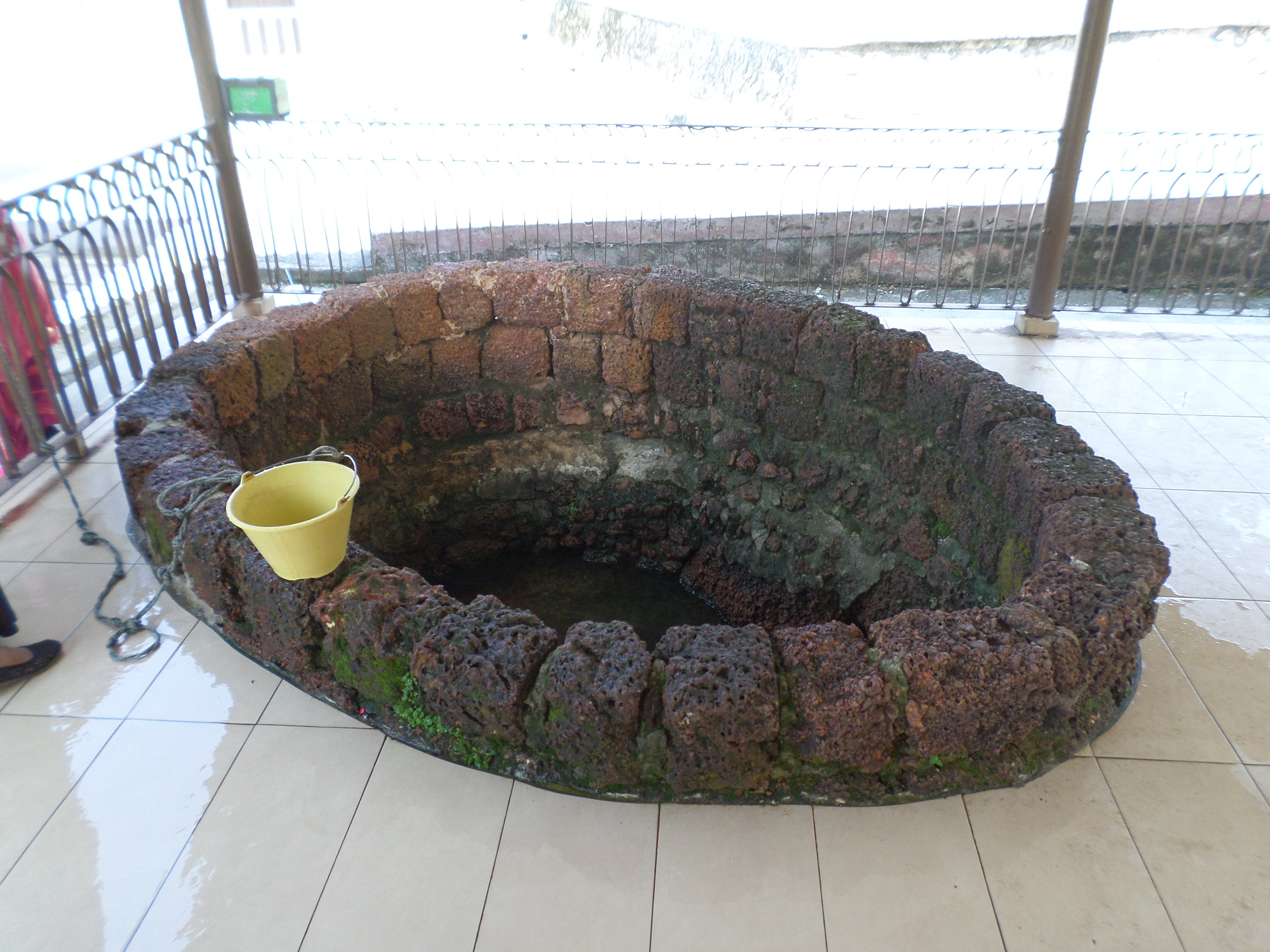
- Interactive map of the Hang Tuah's Well area

General information
- Type: water well
- Location: Hang Tuah Village, Kampung Duyong, Duyong, Malacca, Malaysia
- Coordinates: 2°12′00.2″N 102°17′49.0″E

Height
- Height: 1.8 m (5 ft 11 in)

Technical details
- Material: Laterite

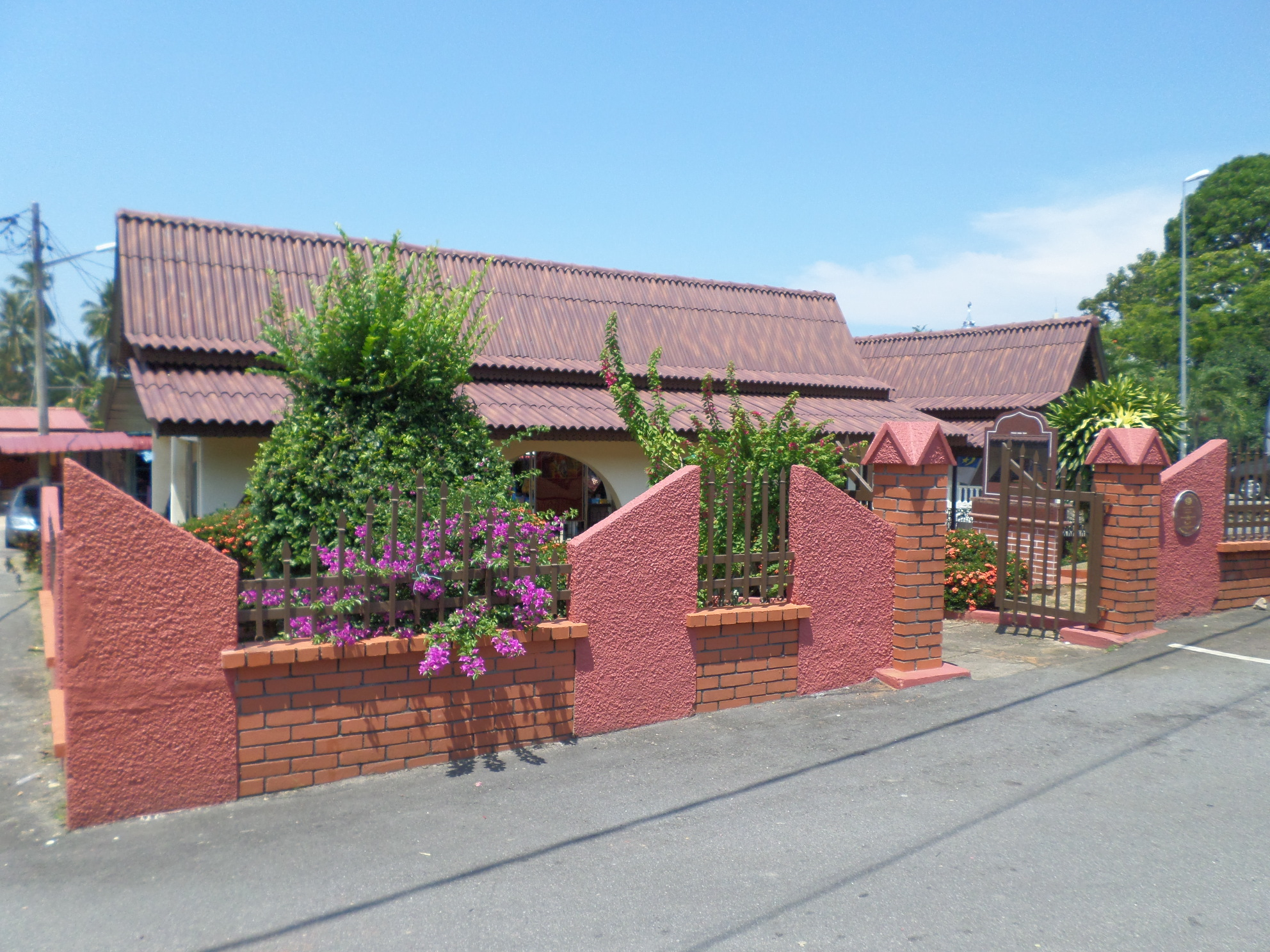
Building surrounding Hang Tuah's Well

Hang Tuah Well (Malay: Perigi Hang Tuah) is a 1.8-meter-deep water well, which is located in Hang Tuah Village, Kampung Duyong, Duyong, Malacca, Malaysia. It was declared as a historical monument under the Antiquities Act on 29 September 1977. According to the folklore, it is believed that Hang Tuah dug the well himself for his own use.

There is also urban legend where it was believed the well housed a white crocodile that can only be seen by alim ulama.

== Structure ==
The well is 1.8 metre deep. The wall were made from laterite and the well were claimed to never empty even during draught season. The well is still in use by the public for their daily water usage by the surrounding neighborhood and during water disruption window.

== See also ==
- List of tourist attractions in Malacca
