= Hang Tuah Village =

Village in Melaka Tengah, Malacca, Malaysia

Coordinates: 2°12′01.7″N 102°17′34.1″E

- Perkampungan Hang Tuah
- Interactive map of the Hang Tuah Village area

General information
- Type: Village
- Location: Kampung Duyong, Malacca, Malaysia
- Opening: 9 August 2013

Technical details
- Floor area: 10 hectares

The Hang Tuah Village (Malay: Perkampungan Hang Tuah) is a village in Kampung Duyong, Malacca, Malaysia. It was opened to the public on 9 August 2013. The village spreads over an area of 10.4 hectares and consists of Hang Tuah Centre, Hang Tuah's Well, House of Traditional Costumes and Batik Gallery.

== See also ==
- List of tourist attractions in Malacca
- Hang Tuah
