= Tun Teja Mausoleum =

Mausoleum in Jasin, Melaka, Malaysia

- Makam Tun Teja
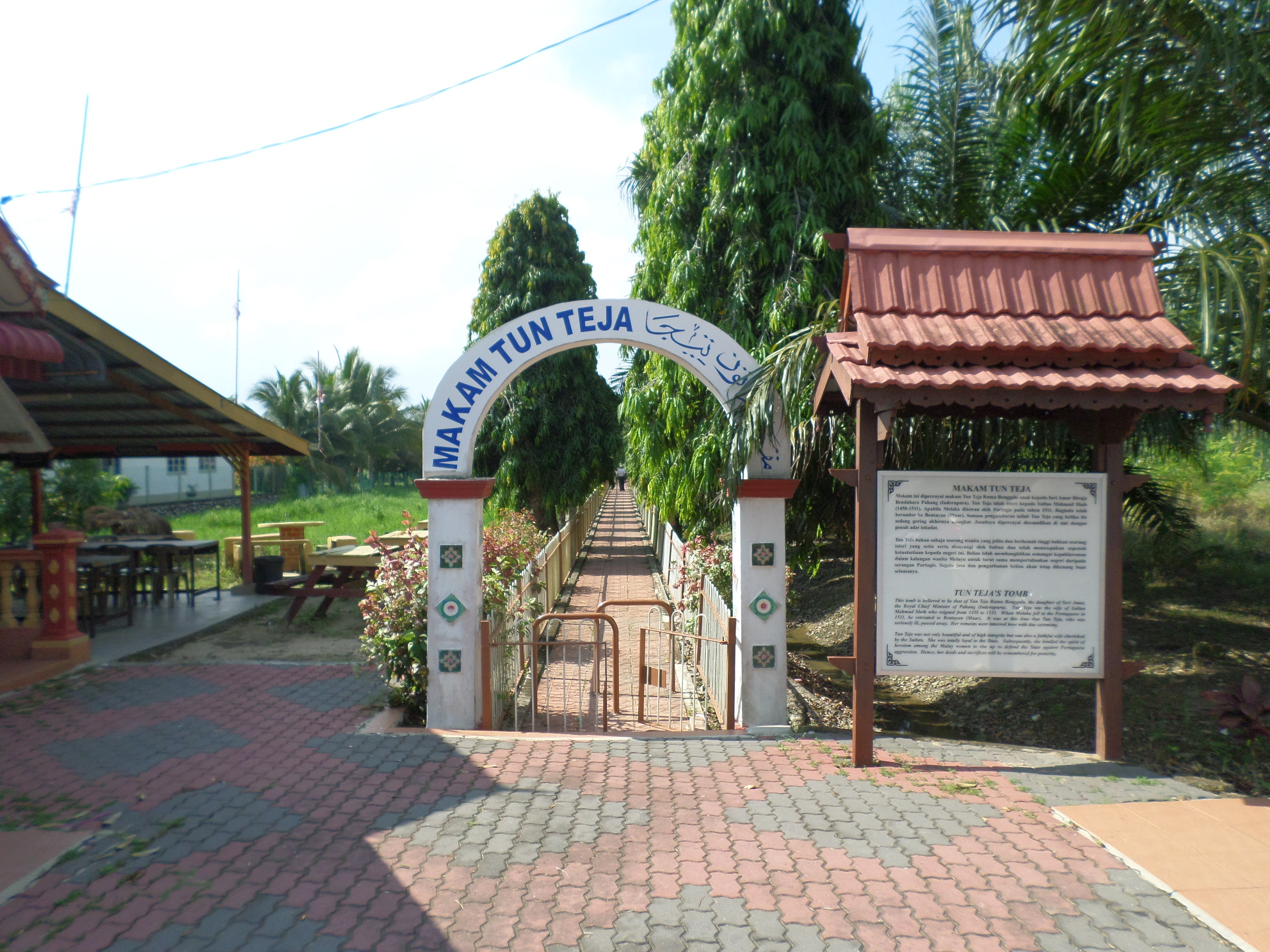
- Interactive map of Tun Teja Mausoleum

Details
- Location: Jasin, Melaka, Malaysia
- Coordinates: 2°8′8.4″N 102°24′51.5″E
- Type: mausoleum

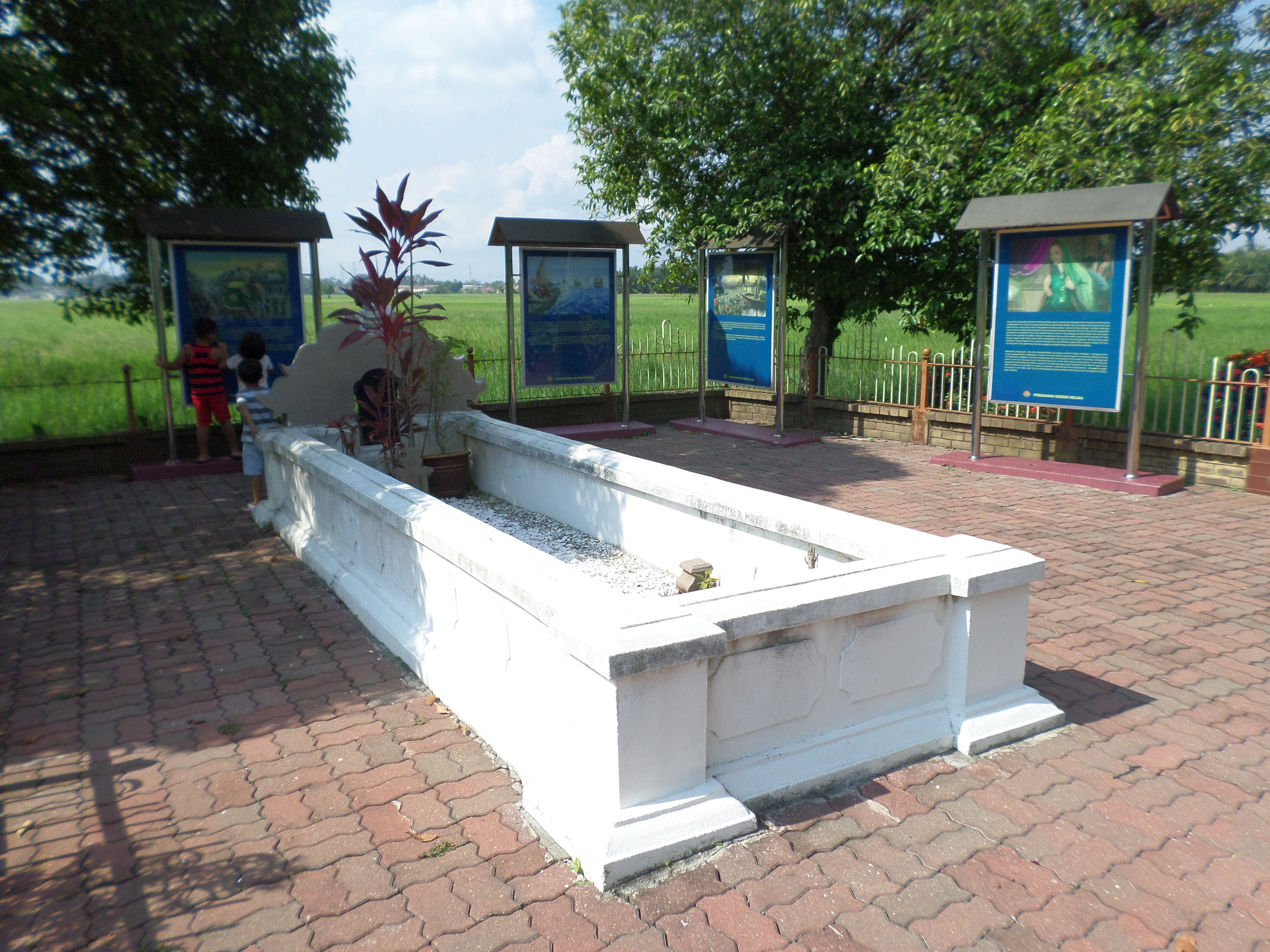
The tomb of Tun Teja

The Tun Teja Mausoleum (Malay: Makam Tun Teja) is the mausoleum of Tun Teja located in Merlimau, Jasin District, Melaka, Malaysia. It is the burial place of Tun Teja Ratna Benggala, consort of Sultan Mahmud Shah who ruled Melaka from 1488 to 1511.

As the king was escaping the invasion of the Portuguese in 1511 with his army, Tun Teja was believed to have died on the way to Muar, Johor before being buried at Kampung Pengkalan Samak.

== Architecture ==
Her mausoleum is located in the middle of a paddy field. Her tomb is painted in white and the headstone is covered with yellow cloths. The entrance to the tomb can be accessed via an archway and a long path flanked by tall temple pillar trees.

== See also ==
- List of tourist attractions in Melaka
