= Tun Teja =

Malay royalty

- Queen of Malacca
- Born: c. 1470; Pahang Sultanate
- Died: 1511; Malacca
- Burial: Tun Teja Mausoleum
- Spouse: Mahmud Shah
- Issue: Ahmad Shah I
Names
- Tun Teja Ratna Menggala
- House: Melaka
- Father: Bendahara Seri Amar Diraja Pahang
- Religion: Sunni Islam

Tun Teja Ratna Benggala was a princess of Pahang origins and the second wife to the last Sultanate of Malacca, Mahmud Shah of Malacca.

== Contributions ==
Some sources say she aided the resistance against Portuguese colonialism in the Malay Peninsula.

She is believed to have died after the Portuguese invasion in 1511. Her tomb, the Tun Teja Mausoleum, is a historic monument and popular tourist location.

== Legacy ==
In Malay culture, the phrase "kecantikan Tun Teja" (beauty of Tun Teja) has become a figure of speech reflecting incontestable perfection and purity.

Tun Teja has also been notable for her life being featured in a number of dramatizations. In 1961 a dramatized movie of her life was created. Her life is also depicted in an upcoming animated movie also called "Tun Teja".
