= Laksamana =

Position of admiral within the armed forces in Malay and Indonesia areas

The Laksamana (Jawi: لقسامان) is a position within the armed forces, similar to the position of admiral in Malay sultanates and in present-day countries like Indonesia and Malaysia. Since South East Asia was part of Indosphere of Greater India since earlier, during and after the Hinduised Srivijaya empire, Hindu titles based on Sanskrit were used. The word Laksamana originated from Lakshmana, a figure in the Hindu epic of Ramayana.

== Malacca Sultanate ==
The Laksamana in the Malacca Sultanate was a key figure responsible for safeguarding the Sultanate’s maritime security, particularly along the vital China-India trade route in the Straits of Malacca, which was the lifeline of the empire. As the commander of the Malaccan fleet, the Laksamana held significant authority, outranked only by the Bendahara (prime minister) and the Sultan. In addition to his naval duties, the Laksamana also served in roles akin to a modern-day head of diplomatic affairs and vice minister of war.

The legendary Hikayat Hang Tuah records Laksamana Hang Tuah being sent on numerous diplomatic missions to destinations such as the Vijayanagara Empire in South India, China, Thailand, and even the Ottoman Empire. Similarly, the Rekidai Hoan, an official record from the Ryukyu Kingdom, mentions a Malaccan diplomatic envoy led by "Lezoumana" or "Lo-hsi-ma-na", reflecting the Laksamana’s international significance.

Historical sources, including the Suma Oriental and the Malay Annals, identify only three named Laksamana during the Sultanate's history. Hang Tuah served under Sultan Mansur Shah, followed by Khoja Hussain and Hang Nadim, who served under Sultan Mahmud Shah.

== Modern-day usage ==
=== Navy and coast guard ===
In modern times, the word refers to a rank in Brunei (by the Royal Brunei Navy), in Indonesia (by the Indonesian Navy and Indonesian Maritime Security Agency) and in Malaysia (by the Royal Malaysian Navy and Malaysian Maritime Enforcement Agency).

The common grades for "Laksamana" title are:

1. Laksamana armada (lit. 'Fleet admiral', a five-star rank used by Royal Malaysian Navy)
2. Laksamana besar (lit. 'Grand admiral', a five-star rank used by Indonesian Navy)
3. Laksamana (lit. 'Admiral', a four-star rank)
4. Laksamana madya (lit. 'Middle admiral', "Vice Admiral", a three-star rank)
5. Laksamana muda (lit. 'Young/junior admiral', "Rear Admiral", a two-star rank)
6. Laksamana pertama (lit. 'First admiral', a one-star rank, Rear Admiral or Commodore)

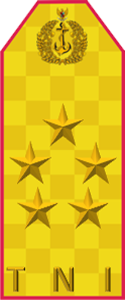
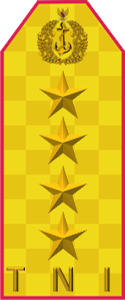
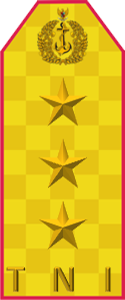
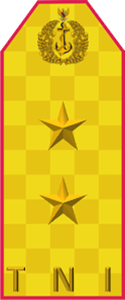
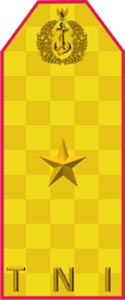
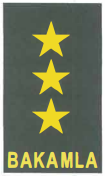
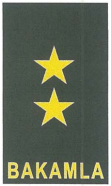
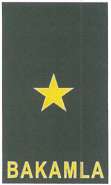
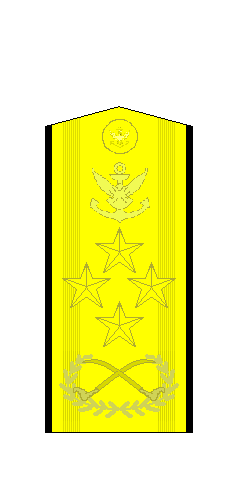
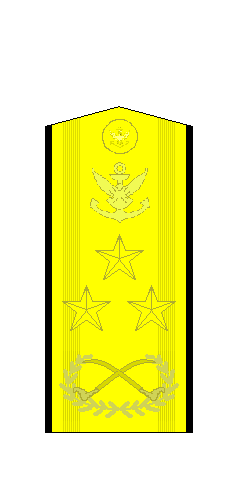
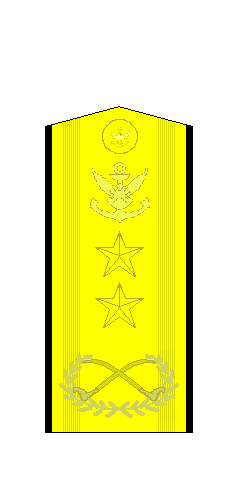
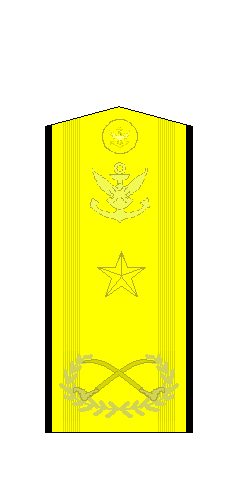
Rank	Laksamana armada or Laksamana besar	Laksamana	Laksamana madya	Laksamana muda	Laksamana pertama
	Admiral of the Fleet	Admiral	Vice Admiral	Rear admiral	Commodore
Royal Brunei Navy
Indonesian Navy
Indonesian Maritime Security Agency
Royal Malaysian Navy
Malaysian Maritime Enforcement Agency

== Usage other than as military title ==
In Brunei, Laksamana College of Business (Malay: Kolej Perniagaan Laksamana) is an accredited private university college established in 2003. The college also acted as a subsidiary college of the Kensington College of Business.

In Indonesia, Laksamana mengamuk is a drink from Riau. This drink is made from mango mixed with coconut milk and sugar. Usually served during Ramadan.

In Malaysia, Laksamana class is a class of small missile corvettes comprising four ships in service with the Royal Malaysian Navy. As of 5 June 2025, two ships of the Laksamana class are serving in the 24th Corvette Squadron of the Royal Malaysian Navy, while the remaining two were decommissioned.

In Philippines, Laksamana, along with its Hispanicized forms Lacsamana and Laxamana, is a family name among the Kapampangan people of the Philippines and their descendants.

== See also ==
- Bendahara
- Syahbandar
- Temenggung
