= Hang Tuah =

15th-century figure from Malacca

- هڠ تواه (Malay)
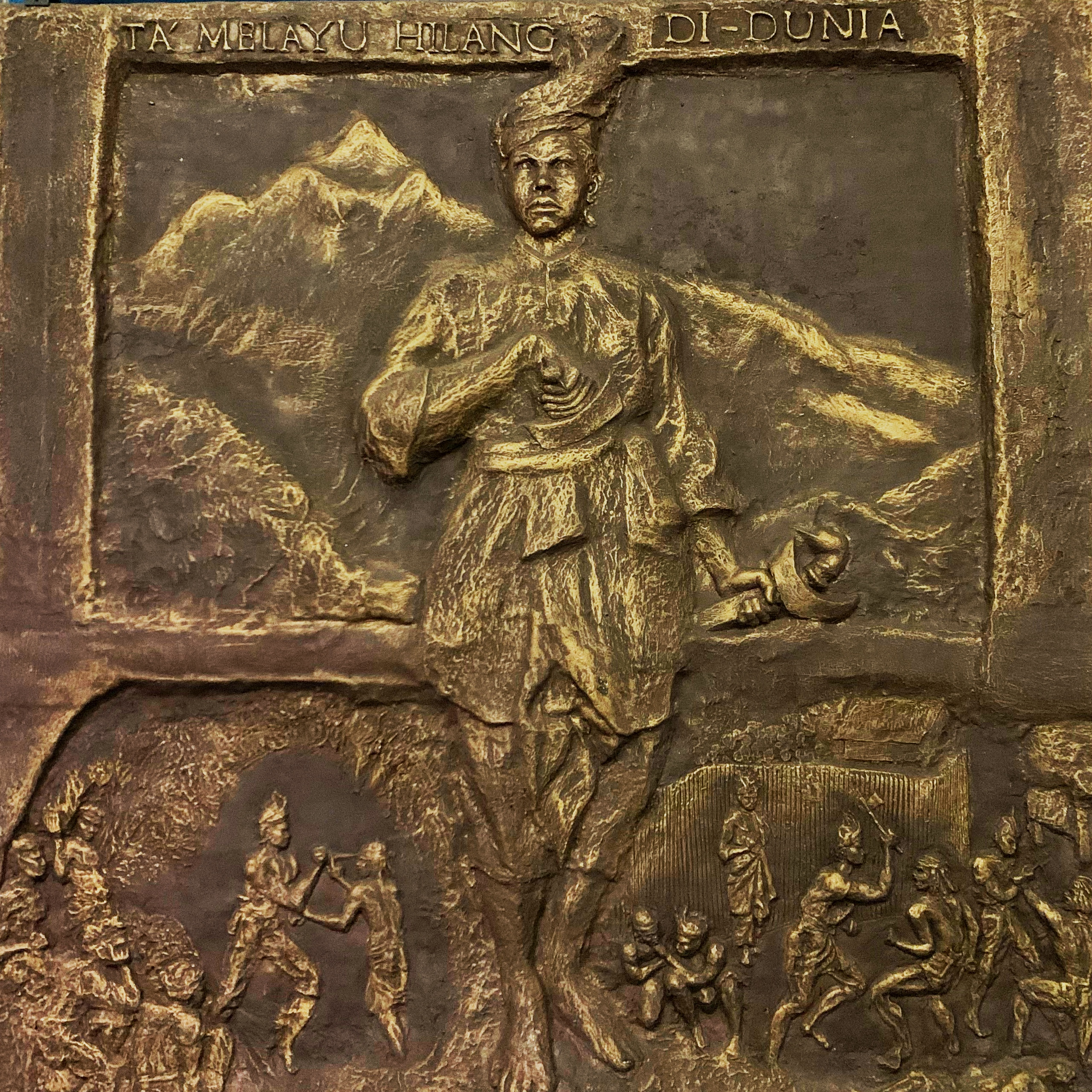
- Bronze bas relief of Tuah made in 1962 by Waveney Jenkins for the National Museum, Kuala Lumpur.
- Resting place: Hang Tuah Mausoleum, Tanjung Kling, Malacca or Sumatra, Malacca Sultanate
- Occupation: Laksamana
- Era: Malacca Sultanate
- Spouse(s): Tun Sundari; Tun Ratna
- Children: 3 or 5
- Parent(s): Hang Mahmud (father); Dang Merduwat (mother)

Hang Tuah (Jawi: هڠ تواه, from Malay توه pronounced [tuha] or [toh]) was a Malay warrior and admiral (Note: Equivalent to modern-day Laksamana.) who purportedly lived in Malacca during the reign of Sultan Mansur Shah in the 15th century. (Note: According to the semi-historical Malay Annals (Sejarah Melayu). However, there is limited historical evidence for his existence.)

He was supposedly known as a diplomat and a silat master. Hang Tuah is the most illustrious warrior figure in Malay literature. However, he is somewhat a contested figure and there is dispute in regards about the factual basis on Hang Tuah's true life story.

== Historicity ==
The veracity of Hang Tuah has been the subject of debate among historians for a century. In 2012, historian Khoo Kay Kim noted that there was no historical evidence for Hang Tuah's tangible existence.

Since 2016, some historians have suggested that Hang Tuah is referred to in the Rekidai Hoan, an official record from the Ryukyu Islands. The document spans the period from 1424 to 1867 and records the arrival of a certain admiral from Malacca dubbed the "Lezoumana" or "Lo-hsi-ma-na" which is similar to Tuah's title of Laksamana as mentioned in the Annals.

Afonso de Albuquerque's Commentaries of the Great Afonso Dalboquerque, Second Viceroy of India mention a Lassamane (Laksamana) who was eighty years old at the time of the Portuguese capture of Malacca in 1511, described as “a good soldier, of good repute and great knowledge,” as follows:

...when he perceived that the king of Malaca was lost, he went and settled in Singapura, and after Afonso Dalbuquerque was in possession of Malaca, he came down to the river of Muar and sent to ask a safeguard, declaring that he was desirous of returning to live at Malaca and serving the king of Portugal. Afonso Dalbuquerque sent him the safeguard; nevertheless he would not come, and it was thought that some of the Moors of Malaca, hoping to gain favours from Afonso Dalboquerque and obtain the government of the land had written something to this Lassamane, whereby they had prevented his coming, for they feared that as he was a man of uncommon capabilities, Afonso Dalboquerque would seize the opportunity to make use of him for the governing of Malaca.

Scholarly research suggests that the Laksamana mentioned in Afonso's commentaries might be Khoja Hassan, the son-in-law of Hang Tuah. (Note: Khoja Hassan is a character mentioned in the Malay Annals as follows: 'the Laksamana (admiral) under Sultan Mahmud (the last king of Melaka), named Khoja Husain, who was the son-in-law of Hang Tuah, and who was also known as Khoja Hassan'. It was he who, after accepting bribes, reported to Sultan Mahmud that the Bendahara (Prime Minister) Sri Maharaja was planning treason, which resulted in the execution of the bendahara and his family. When the falseness of the claims became known, Sultan Mahmud orders Khoja Hassan to be castrated. For some reason, likely connected with his castration by the sultan, he was supportive of Portuguese efforts to trade in Melaka. Subsequently, after the fall of Melaka, he served the Portuguese administration in that city or acted as a mediator between the Melaka court in exile and the Portuguese.) However, this theory remains contested due to the age discrepancies, his tarnished reputation from his involvement in political plots and subsequent punishment by the Sultan.

Nevertheless, since Hang Tuah is not explicitly named in these documents, the identification remains unproven.

== Ethnicity ==
Regardless of the historicity of Hang Tuah, his ethnicity is the source of some dispute. Legend has it that Hang Tuah had aboriginal Jakun ancestry from Bintan Island.

== Biography ==
Hang Tuah's life and career as a laksamana (admiral) includes tales of his accomplishments and unfaltering loyalty to his sultan, some of which are chronicled in the Sejarah Melayu (the semi-historical Malay Annals) and Hikayat Hang Tuah (a romantic collection of tales involving Hang Tuah), both being written in the 17th century in its earliest versions.

According to legend, Hang Tuah learns silat together with his four comrades, Hang Kasturi, Hang Jebat, Hang Lekir and Hang Lekiu. Their teacher is Adi Putra, a renowned master who lived a hermetic life at the top of a mountain. The comrades encounter and deal with a man running amok. Following this incident, Hang Tuah is presented to Sultan Muzaffar Shah by his bendahara, Tun Perak.

Hang Tuah is given the title of laksamana when he accompanies his lord Sultan Mansur Shah to Majapahit where the sultan is to marry a Majapahit princess. Hang Tuah is shown to be the most courageous and closest servant to the sultan as he rescues a royal horse from a cresspool. However, later, his laksamana title is taken away from him as he is accused of slander and is forced to go into hiding. When Hang Kasturi starts a revolt, Hang Tuah is called back to the Malacca court and he manages to kill Kasturi. This results in him retaking the title of Laksamana and he again becomes the sultan's closest servant.

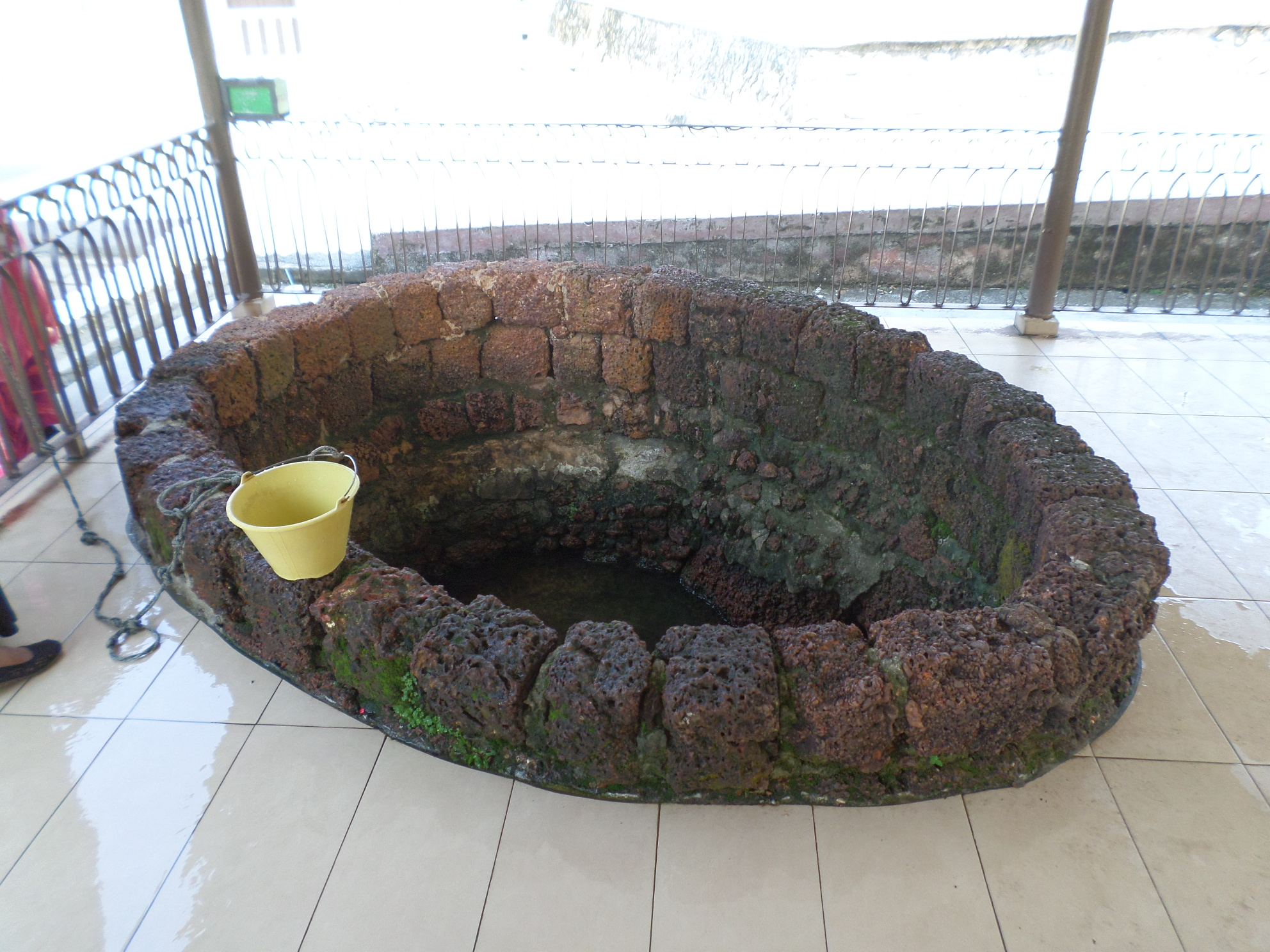
Hang Tuah's Well in Kampung Duyong, Malacca

Numerous tales describe his successes in dealing with tasks given by the sultan: in one tale, Hang Tuah protects Malacca from an attack by Semerluki, a Makasarese privateer and prince. Another tale sees Hang Tuah sent to Haru to engage in war, which saw the Malaccan fleet winning. In another, he goes to Siak to ask for its allegiance to Malacca and succeeds. He is also responsible in managing Puteri Gunung Ledang to marry his lord. Hang Tuah is sent to Siam, China, Brunei, and Keling, along with envoys and Malaccan courtiers. He is also sent to Pasai to vassalise it under Malacca, but he is shown to lack courage and only with the help of the bendahara's son, the mission is successful.

He continues to be the sultan's constant aide, accompanying him on official visits to foreign countries. On one such visit to Majapahit, Hang Tuah fights a duel with the famed pendekar Taming Sari. After this brutal fight, Hang Tuah emerges victorious, and then Singhavikramavardhana, the ruler of Majapahit, bestows upon him Taming Sari's kris or dagger. The Keris Taming Sari was named after its original owner, and is purported to be magical, empowering its owner with physical invulnerability.

Another story concerning Hang Tuah's loyalty to the ruler is found in the Hikayat Hang Tuah, and involves his visit to Inderaputra or Pahang during one such voyage. The sultan sends Hang Tuah to Pahang with the task of persuading the princess Tun Teja, who was already engaged, to become the sultan's companion. Tun Teja falls under the impression that Hang Tuah had come to persuade her to marry him, not the sultan, and agrees to elope with him to Malacca. It was only during the voyage home that Hang Tuah reveals his deception to Tun Teja. The Hikayat Hang Tuah and Sejarah Melayu each carry different accounts of this incident. The Hikayat records that it is Hang Tuah who persuades Tun Teja to elope with him, thus deceiving her.

=== Hang Jebat ===
Perhaps the most famous story in which Hang Tuah is involved is the fight with his closest childhood companion, Hang Jebat. Hang Tuah's deep loyalty to and popularity with the sultan leads to rumours being circulated that Hang Tuah is having an illicit affair with one of the sultan's dayang (court stewardesses). The sultan then sentences Hang Tuah to death without trial for the alleged offence. The death sentence is not carried out, however, because Hang Tuah's executioner, the bendahara (chief minister), goes against the sultan's orders and hides Hang Tuah in a remote region of Malacca.

The story continues with Hang Jebat believing that Hang Tuah is dead, murdered unjustly by the king he served. Hang Jebat then decides to avenge his friend's death. Hang Jebat's revenge becomes either a palace killing spree or furious rebellion against the sultan (sources differ as to what actually occurred). It remains consistent however that Hang Jebat wreaks havoc onto the royal court, and the sultan is unable to stop him, as none of the warriors dares to challenge the more ferocious and skilled Hang Jebat. The bendahara then informs the sultan that the only man who is able to stop Hang Jebat is still alive: Hang Tuah. The bendahara recalls Hang Tuah from his hiding place; the warrior is given full amnesty by the sultan and is instructed to kill Hang Jebat. After seven gruelling days of fighting, Hang Tuah is able to kill Hang Jebat.

The two main sources for Hang Tuah differ yet again on the details of the final aspect of his life. According to the Hikayat Hang Tuah, it is Hang Jebat who avenges his friend's death, only to be killed by the same friend, but according to Sejarah Melayu, it is Hang Kasturi. The Sejarah Melayu are unique in that they constitute the only available account of the history of the Malay Sultanate in the 15th and early 16th century, but the Hang Jebat story, as the more romantic tale, remains more popular.

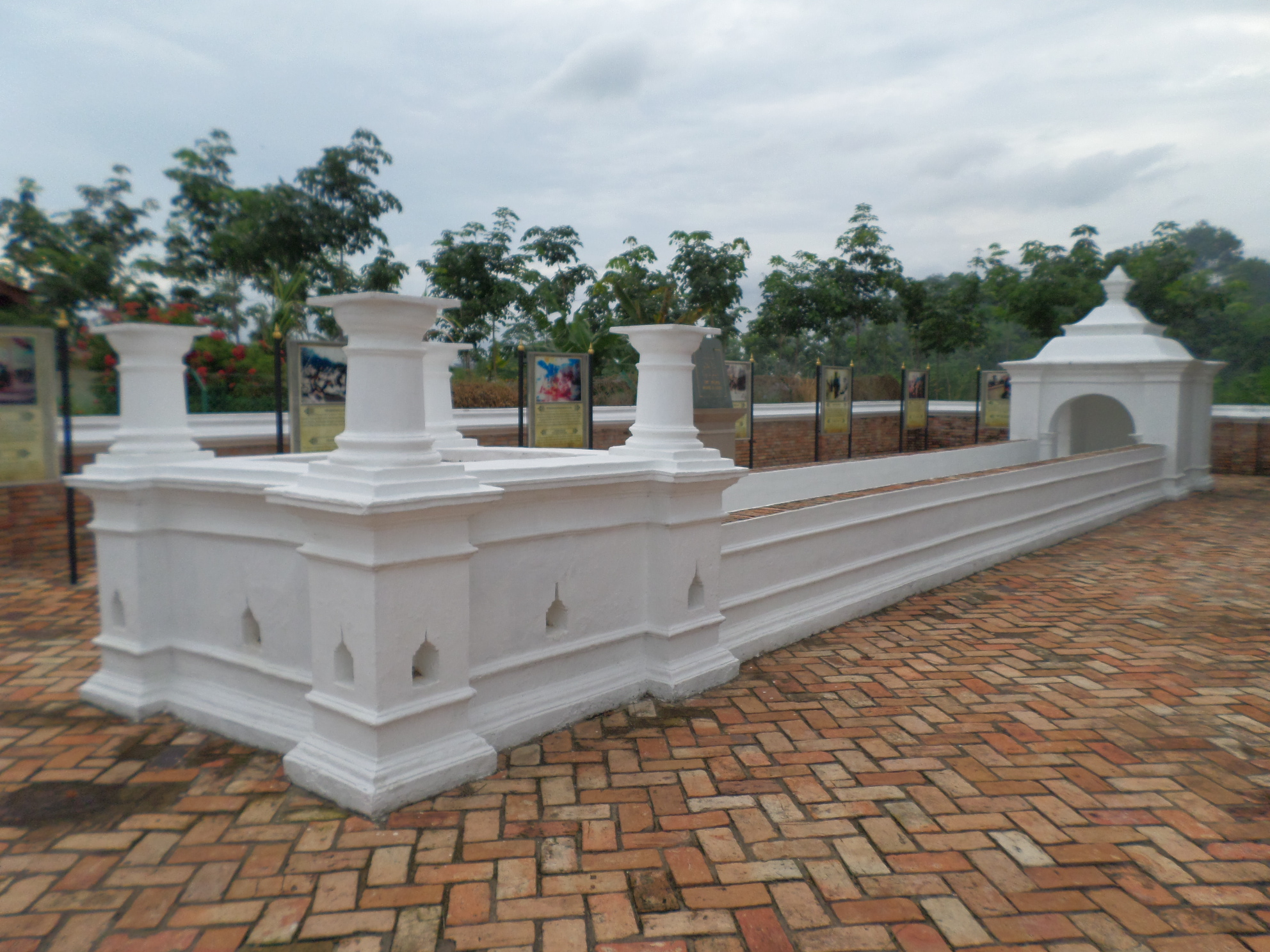
Hang Tuah Mausoleum, located in Tanjong Kling

=== Later life ===
Sources show that Malacca kept the peace as Hang Tuah protected the common man and was considerate to the oppressed. The Hikayat Hang Tuah describes that not only Malacca falls apart but also that Hang Tuah makes a long journey to Mecca and 'Rum' and he continuous to live in peace and becomes a wandering darwish. He eventually falls with fever and headaches, showing that his end was near.

According to other sources, Hang Tuah lives to an old age, and his body is buried in Tanjung Kling in Malacca, where his tomb can still be seen today; however some say his body is actually buried in Bintan. Other sources state that, following the arrival of the Portuguese, Hang Tuah moves to Singapura.

== Legacy ==
Hang Tuah remains popular in Malaysia, embodying the values of allegiance and loyalty. The legend of the tragic friendship between Hang Tuah and Hang Jebat represents the conflict between loyalty and justice.

Hang Tuah is associated with the saying, "Takkan Melayu hilang di dunia" ('never shall Malays vanish [from the face of the earth]') which had been made a rallying cry for Malay nationalism in early 20th century; however, there is no historical record attributing the saying to Hang Tuah, nor is it found in the Hikayat Hang Tuah; On other hand, the phrase was popularised by well known local Malayan author Abdul Ahmad Samad in his 1950 literary work, Dosaku.

== Popular culture ==
=== Film and television ===
Hang Tuah is a prominent figure in Malaysia's popular culture and his story has been adapted into several movies. Famous portrayals include:

- P. Ramlee in Hang Tuah (1956)
- M. Amin in Hang Jebat (1961)
- Pak Yem in Puteri Gunong Ledang (1961)
- Bidin Subari in television drama Terajidi Hang Jebat (1965) for Talivishen Malaysia
- Jamal Abdillah in Tuah (1990)
- Jalaluddin Hassan in time travel fiction film XX Ray 2 (1995) by Aziz M. Osman, about modern scientists sent back to the 15th century, when Hang Tuah was alive. The film imagines the hero getting his attributed quote Takkan Melayu Hilang Di Dunia from one of the scientists from the future.
- Khairudin Samsudin in Season 1 episode 2 of Robbie And The Book Of Tales (2000) for Kids Central
- M. Nasir in Puteri Gunung Ledang (2004). Nasir also portrays Hang Tuah in a Kit Kat commercial where the warrior (unrelated to the character in the Ledang movie) enters a modern convenience store.
- Saiful Apek in Magika (2010)

=== Comics ===
In 1951, Indonesian author Nasjah Djamin wrote Hang Tuah (Untuk Anak-Anak) ("Hang Tuah for Children") published by Balai Antara, making it the first locally published comic book in the country.

== Places and things named after Hang Tuah ==
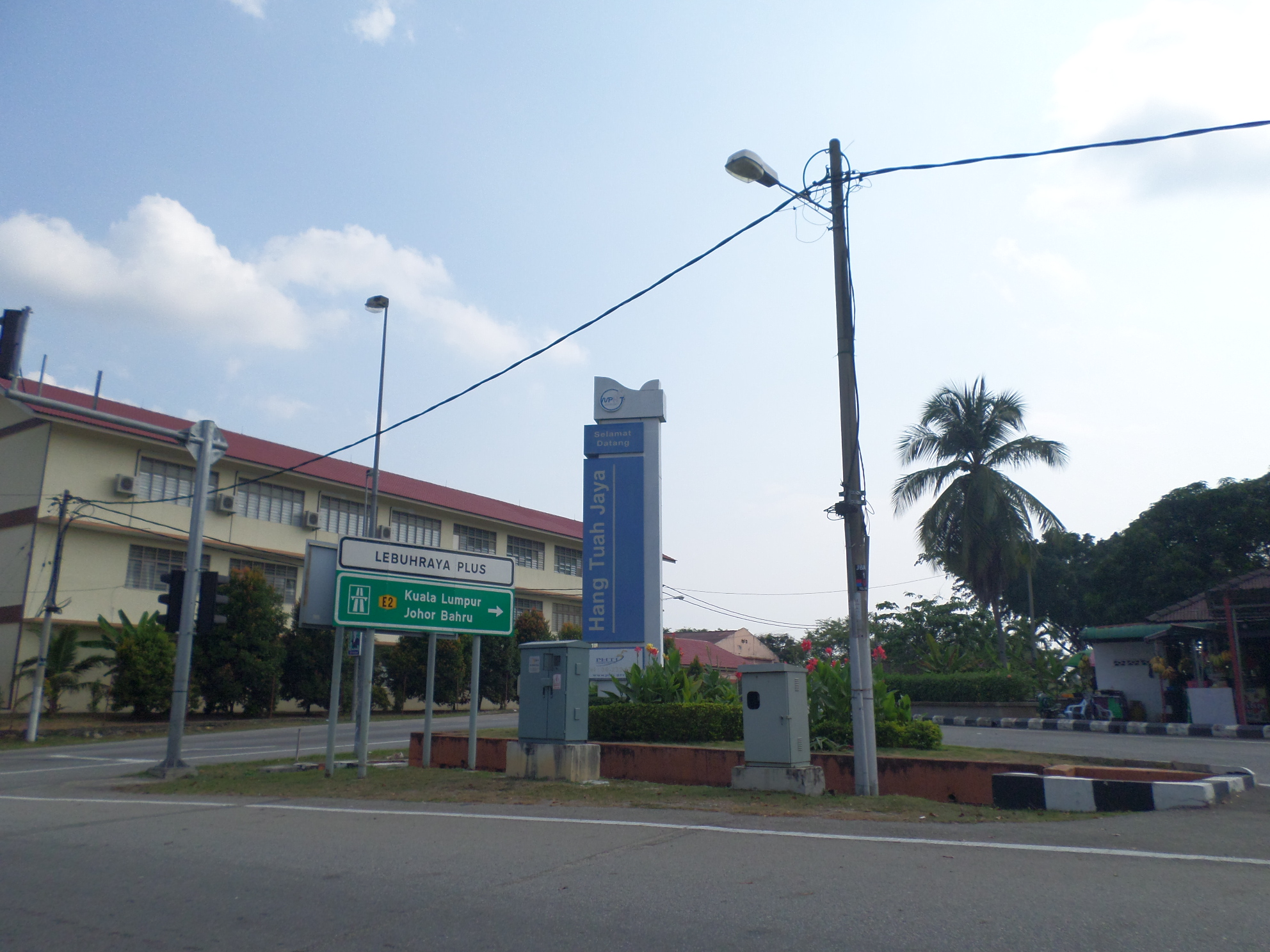
Hang Tuah Jaya

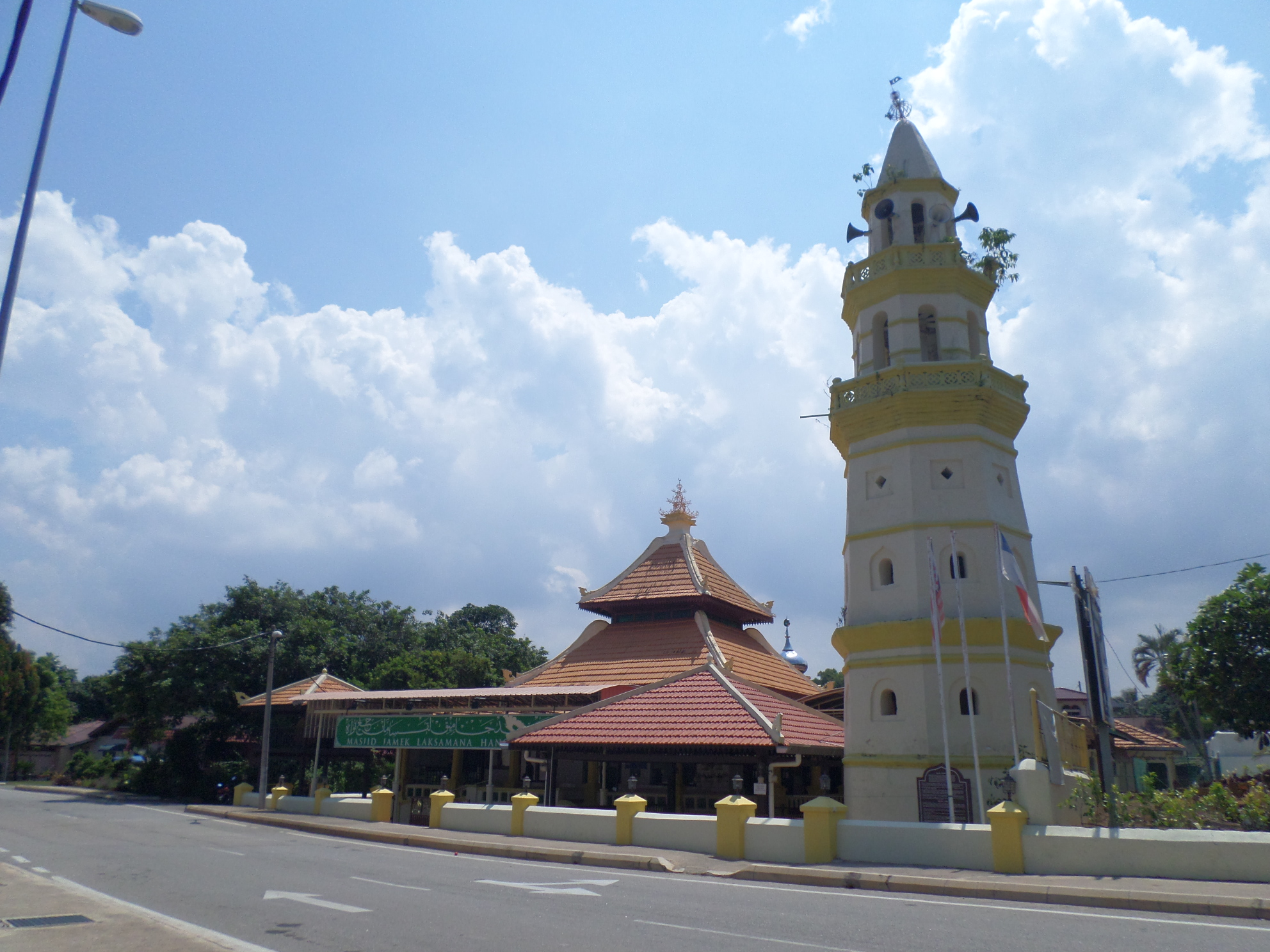
Admiral Hang Tuah Jamek Mosque

=== Malaysia ===
- Five roads in Malaysia are named after Hang Tuah: Jalan Hang Tuah in Kuala Lumpur, and similarly named streets in Johor, Malacca, Muar, and Ipoh.
- The Royal Malaysian Navy has two frigates named after Hang Tuah, KD Hang Tuah (F433) and KD Hang Tuah (F76).
- A strip along Jalan Hang Tuah has been renamed Hang Tuah Mall and popularised as a tourist attraction.
- An LRT station and Monorail station in Kuala Lumpur is named Hang Tuah. It is an interchange station.
- Medan Hang Tuah, a major food court and hawker centre is located at Sunway Putra Mall, Kuala Lumpur.
- Hang Tuah Stadium, a stadium in Malacca City.
- Hang Tuah's Well, a water well in Hang Tuah Village in Kampung Duyong, Duyong, Malacca.
- Hang Tuah Jaya, a municipality and parliamentary constituency in Malacca.
- Admiral Hang Tuah Jamek Mosque, a mosque in Malacca.
- Hang Tuah Centre, an attraction in Malacca.
- Hang Tuah Village, a village in Kampung Duyong, Duyong, Malacca.
- Hang Tuah Bridge, a bridge in Malacca City across Malacca River.
- Hang Tuah Hall, a building in Malacca City beside the Hang Tuah Bridge.

=== Indonesia ===
- Certain roads in several major cities are named after the warrior as Jalan Hang Tuah: in Pekanbaru, Jakarta, Batam, Tanjung Pinang, Medan, Surabaya, Palembang, Padang, Palu, Denpasar, and Bandung
- Hang Tuah University, a major university established by the Indonesian Navy in Surabaya
- The Indonesian Navy has two ships named after Hang Tuah, Bathurst-class corvette RI Hang Tuah and Riga-class frigate KRI Hang Tuah (358).
- Hang Tuah Park, a Park in Riau Main Stadium in Pekanbaru
- Hang Tuah Stadium, a green space in Masjid Agung An-Nur in Pekanbaru

== See also ==
- Hang Jebat, close companion of Hang Tuah
- Hikayat Hang Tuah, an early 18th-century Malay epic
- Tanjong Kling, the mausoleum of Hang Tuah is located within the Mukim
- Legend of Puteri Gunung Ledang, a legendary princess whom Hang Tuah interacted with
- Malay folklore
