= Tiara Jacquelina =

Malaysian actress

Yang Berbahagia Puan Sri Tiara Jacquelina
- Born: Jacqueline Eu; 3 October 1967 (age 58); Kuala Lumpur, Malaysia
- Other names: Tiara Jacquelina Eu Effendi; Tiara Jacquelina Eu Abdullah
- Occupations: Producer, actress, singer
- Years active: 1988–present
- Spouses: Hani Mohsin (m. 1993; div. 1998); Tan Sri Mohd Effendi Norwawi (m. 1997)
- Children: 2

Puan Sri Tiara Jacquelina Eu Abdullah (born 3 October 1967) is a Malaysian actress, film producer, musical theater producer, singer and the founder of The Enfiniti Academy of Musical Theatre and Performing Arts. She is well-acclaimed for her role in Puteri Gunung Ledang, the biggest budget movie ever produced in Malaysia up until 2005, in which she played the lead character and sang the theme song, "Asmaradana". Aside from appearing on stage and on camera, Tiara Jacquelina also serves as the managing director of Enfiniti (M) Sdn. Bhd. (also known as Fairy-Star Studios or trade Elegant Pursuit), registered as Fairy-Star Studios Sdn. Bhd. and Tiara Jacquelina will be branding its television production, film studio and theater, a Malaysian arts, entertainment, and television production company.

== Early life and career ==
Jacquelina was born as Jacqueline Eu on 3 October 1967 in Kuala Lumpur, Malaysia to a Burmese Chinese father and Indonesian Chinese mother.

She began her film career in 1988. In 1995, Jacquelina co-starred with Academy Award winner, Frances McDormand, who played the lead role in the movie, Beyond Rangoon. In the 12th Malaysia Film Festival later that year, she won the Best Actress Award for her role in the film Ringgit Kasorrga, a social drama concerning a sex scandal involving a politician and young models. In 2004, she played the title character, a legendary Javanese princess in Puteri Gunung Ledang, which gained her recognition. The movie was submitted for the Best Foreign Language Film category at the Academy Awards in 2004 but was not nominated.

Following the success of the film, she later staged it as a musical at Istana Budaya in 2006 with the title, Puteri Gunung Ledang: The Musical.

Recently, in March 2018, Jacquelina adapted and directed Ola Bola: The Musical, a theatrical musical that was staged at Istana Budaya and has received positive reviews from both the media and its viewers. The musical was staged after the movie, Ola Bola, after marking its success in Malaysian cinematography in 2016 where the story revolves around the history of Malaysian national football team in their journey of paving their way into the 1980 Summer Olympics.

Jacquelina is the founder and owner of popular glamping resort Tiarasa Escapes, located in Janda Baik, Pahang.

== Personal life ==
Jacquelina was raised in a Buddhist family, but she converted to Christianity when she was 12. However, she converted to Islam in 1993and was previously married to actor and celebrity Hani Mohsin, from 1993 until they divorced in 1998. She is the mother of two children.

She later married Sarawakian businessman Mohd Effendi Norwawi, who also formerly served as a senator and minister in the Prime Minister's Department.

== Awards ==
Year	Award	Result	Category	Film
1995	Malaysian Film Festival	Won	Best Actress	Ringgit Kasorrga
2005	Asian First Film Festival	Won	Best Producer	Puteri Gunung Ledang
2005	Asia-Pacific Film Festival	Won	Best Actress	Puteri Gunung Ledang
2005	Malaysian PPFM Oscars 2005	Won	Best Producer	Puteri Gunung Ledang
2005	Malaysian PPFM Oscars 2005	Won	Best Actress	Puteri Gunung Ledang
2009	Federation for Asian Cultural Promotion (FACP Malaysia)	Won	Outstanding Contribution to the Arts	

== Achievements ==
- Executive Producer of the multiple-award-winning film Puteri Gunung Ledang which has garnered 11 awards at the Malaysian Film Festival 2004 including Best Film, Best Producer, Cinematography, Best Actress, Costume Design, Art Direction, Best Sound b) Best Producer at the Asian 1st Films Festival 2005 c) 5 awards at the Malaysian Film Festival 2004 including best director, best screenplay, best art direction, best music score.
- Executive Producer of Puteri Gunung Ledang the Musical which won 8 wards at the 2006 Boh Cameronian Arts Awards for Best Director, Original Script (Bahasa Malaysia), Best Lighting Design, Set Design, Music and Sound Design, Costume Design, Supporting Actor, Audience's Choice Award for Theatre.
- Executive Producer of P. Ramlee the Musical which won 6 awards at the 2007 Boh Cameronian Arts Awards for Best Director, Original Script (Bahasa Malaysia), Set Design, Music and Sound Design, Best Supporting Actor, Audience's Choice Award for Theatre.

== Filmography ==
=== Film ===
Year	Title	Role	Notes
1988	Irisan-Irisan Hati	Ipah	First film debut
1988	Siluman Kera	Sofia	
1988	Lukisan Berlumur Darah	Hannah	
1990	Mat Som	Che Yam	
1992	Yang Disayangi		Sabah's last film
1994	Obses	Siti	
1995	Beyond Rangoon	San San	
1995	Ringgit Karsorgga	Meera (Almeera Almeida)	
1999	Perempuan Melayu Terakhir	Theater actor	
2004	Puteri Gunung Ledang	Gusti Putri, the Mount Ledang princess	As producer

=== Telemovie ===
Year	Title	Role	TV Channel	Notes
1994	Hello	Haz	TV3	
1996	Darling Sayang	Suraya	TV3	
2017	Kontena Ana	—	Astro Citra	Appreciation

=== Web series ===
Year	Title	Role	Network
2021	Keluarga Baha Don 3	Ivana Balkanovich	Viu

=== Television ===
Year	Title	TV channel	Notes
1994	Mikroskop	TV3	Host
1999	Jam 2 Petang	TV3	As producer
1999–2005	Spanar Jaya	NTV7	As producer
2019	Spanar Jaya X	TV3	As executive producer
