= Legend of Puteri Gunung Ledang =

Malaysian legend

The legend revolves around a celestial princess who lived on Mount Ledang, located in present-day Tangkak District, Johor, Malaysia.

== Hikayat Hang Tuah ==
Puteri Gunung Ledang is mentioned by name to be the sultan's daughter (or a citizen, depending on how you view the translation of 'anak perempuan kita' as).

== Sejarah Melayu/Sulalatus Salatin ==
The sultan had heard of the princess' beauty and wanted to marry her, but she set seven impossible conditions for him. The conditions were:

- A golden walkway for her to walk to Malacca from the mountain,
- A silver walkway for her to return from Malacca to the mountain,
- Seven barrels of tears
- Seven barrels of young betel nut juices from the betel tree (Areca catechu) also for her to bathe in,
- Seven trays filled with hearts of germs,
- Seven trays filled with hearts of mosquitoes, and
- A bowl of the blood of the Sultan's young son and gold

All the conditions were set or requested on purpose by the Princess to test the Sultan's love towards her whereby she knew that he will be unable to fulfil them due to their ridiculous and mostly unattainable nature. The last request is rather a difficult decision for the Sultan as the Sultan's son was his only child.

Some versions of the legend say that the Sultan was not able to fulfil any of these requests, while others say that he was able to fulfil the first six requests (thus causing the ruin of the Malacca Sultanate) but could not fulfil the final request which would have required him to kill his son. The point of the story is that the Sultan was either too proud or too blind to realise that the conditions were the princess's subtle way of turning his proposal down.

Some say that the remnants of the gold and silver bridge still exist, but have been reclaimed by the forest. Others claim that the bridges or walkways can only be seen in the spirit world.

== Further legend ==
Further legend has it that the princess eventually married one Nakhoda Ragam, a hero whose name unfailingly struck terror into the hearts of those who had dared to oppose him. However, this hero was later to die at the hands of his princess-wife. Ragam was fond of tickling the Princess's ribs. One day, in an uncontrollable burst of anger, the Princess stabbed her husband on the chest with a needle she was handling. Thereafter, the Princess returned to Mount Ophir and vowed never to set her eyes on another man. Ragam's boat, not long after, was crushed during a storm and legend has it that the debris of the wreck was transformed into the present six islands off Malacca. It was claimed that the boat's kitchen became Pulau Hanyut, the cake-tray Pulau Nangka, the water-jar Pulau Undan, the incense-burner Pulau Serimbun, the hen-coop Pulau Burong, and the honeymoon cabin of Ragam and the Princess became Pulau Besar.

== Gunung Ledang ==
Ancient history and myth points to the Gunung Ledang mountain being the site of rich gold deposits, luring traders from as far as the Rich. In the 14th century, the Chinese seafarers plying the Straits of Melaka called it 'Kim Sua' meaning the 'Golden Mountain'. The mountain was named 'Gunung Ledang', which means 'mount from afar', during the period of the Majapahit empire. There have even been locals who claimed that the golden bridge connecting to the mountain did manage to get built but is now buried under the ground of the site.

== Adaptations in theatre and film ==
Several adaptations of the tale have been made, all based on the same topic but each varying on the version used or interpretation:

- Puteri Gunong Ledang, a 1961 black-and-white Malayan film starring Elaine Edley.
- Puteri Gunung Ledang, a lavish 2004 Malaysian feature film starring Tiara Jacquelina and M. Nasir. This film was eventually adapted into a stage musical of the same name two years later also starring Tiara plus Stephen Rahman-Hughes.
