= Malaysia Federal Route 141 =

Road in Malaysia

Federal Route 141

Route information
- Maintained by Malaysian Public Works Department
- Length: 1.0 km (0.62 mi)

Major junctions
- North end: Pantai Dusun
- FT 140 Federal Route 140; FT 5 Federal Route 5
- South end: Tanjung Kling

Location
- Country: Malaysia
- Primary destinations: Pantai Kundor, Pelabuhan Beruas

Highway system
- Highways in Malaysia; Expressways; Federal; State

Federal Route 141 (formerly Melaka state route M23) is a federal road in Melaka, Malaysia. The Kilometre Zero of the Federal Route 141 starts at Tanjung Kling.

== Features ==
At most sections, the Federal Route 141 was built under the JKR R5 road standard, allowing maximum speed limit of up to 90 km/h.

== Junction lists ==
The entire route is located in Melaka Tengah District, Malacca.

Legend:

- I/C - Interchange, I/S - Intersection, RSA - Rest and service area, OBR - Overhead bridge restaurant, R/R - Restaurant and rest plaza, L/B - Layby, V/P - Vista point, TN - tunnel, T/P - Toll plaza, BR - Bridge
- C - Cloverleaf, S - Stack, T-A - Trumpet-A, T-B - Trumpet-B, DT - Directional-T/Y, SDT - Semi-Directional-T/Y, P-Y - Partial-Y, D - Diamond, P-C - Partial cloverleaf, D-D - Diverging diamond, D-R - Direct ramp

Location	km	mi	Name	Destinations	Notes
Pantai Kundor	1.0	0.62	Pantai Dusun		
Pantai Kundor			Pantai Kundor	FT 140 Malaysia Federal Route 140 – Tangga Batu	T-junctions
Pantai Kundor			Jalan Bukit Tempayan	Jalan Bukit Tempayan – Tangga Batu	T-junctions
Pantai Kundor			Pantai Rombang		
Pantai Kundor			Pantai Puteri		
Pelabuhan Beruas			Kampung Pengkalan Perigi		
Pelabuhan Beruas			Pelabuhan Beruas		
Tanjung Kling			Tanjung Kling Power Station		
Tanjung Kling			Hang Tuah Mausoleum	Hang Tuah Mausoleum	
Tanjung Kling			Tanjung Kling	Tanjung Kling Mosque	
Tanjung Kling	0.0	0.0	Tanjung Kling	FT 5 Malaysia Federal Route 5 – Port Dickson, Masjid Tanah, Tangga Batu, Klebang, Tengkera, Malacca City	Junctions
1.000 mi = 1.609 km; 1.000 km = 0.621 mi
