= Protected Areas and Protected Places Act 1959 =

Malaysian law to protect important infrastructure

Federal Legislative Council of the Federation of Malaya
- Long title: An Act to provide for protected areas and places.
- Citation: Act 298
- Territorial extent: Malaysia
- Enacted by: Federal Legislative Council
- Commenced: 1 February 1960 — Peninsular Malaysia, [L.N. 27/1960]; 16 September 1963 — Sabah and Sarawak, [L.N. 232/1963]

Legislative history
- First reading: 24 June 1959
- Second reading: 25 June 1959
- Third reading: 25 June 1959

Amended by
- Modification of Laws (Internal Security and Public Order) (Borneo States) Order 1963 [L.N. 232/1963] Malaysian Currency (Ringgit) Act 1975 [Act 160]

Keywords
- critical infrastructure, freedom of movement, trespassing
- Status: In force

Protected Areas and Protected Places Act 1959 (Malay: Akta Kawasan Larangan dan Tempat Larangan 1959) is a Malaysian law that control the movement and entry of persons within key infrastructure, and to prevent unauthorised entry into such places.

Places or buildings such as power station, radio station, waterworks, police station, airport, oil rig, military installation and government offices are often subjected to the protection and control of this Act.

The main difference between "protected area" and "protected place" is that the former generally allow the public to enter, albeit subjected to search and control by an authorized officer, while the latter requires one to obtain prior permission to enter and remain within it.

== History ==
The bill for this law was first tabled to the Federal Legislative Council of Malaya on 24 June 1959. According to Attorney General Cecil Majella Sheridan when the bill was first proposed, there was no permanent legislation on protected areas or places, other than emergency legislation under the Emergency Regulations 1951, which would soon to be revoked in 1960 when the Malayan Emergency was declared over.

The bill was then passed by Federal Legislative Council on 25 June 1959, two days before its permanent dissolution to make way for the 1959 general election that would elect the first Parliament of Malaya.

== Legal provisions ==
=== Protected areas ===
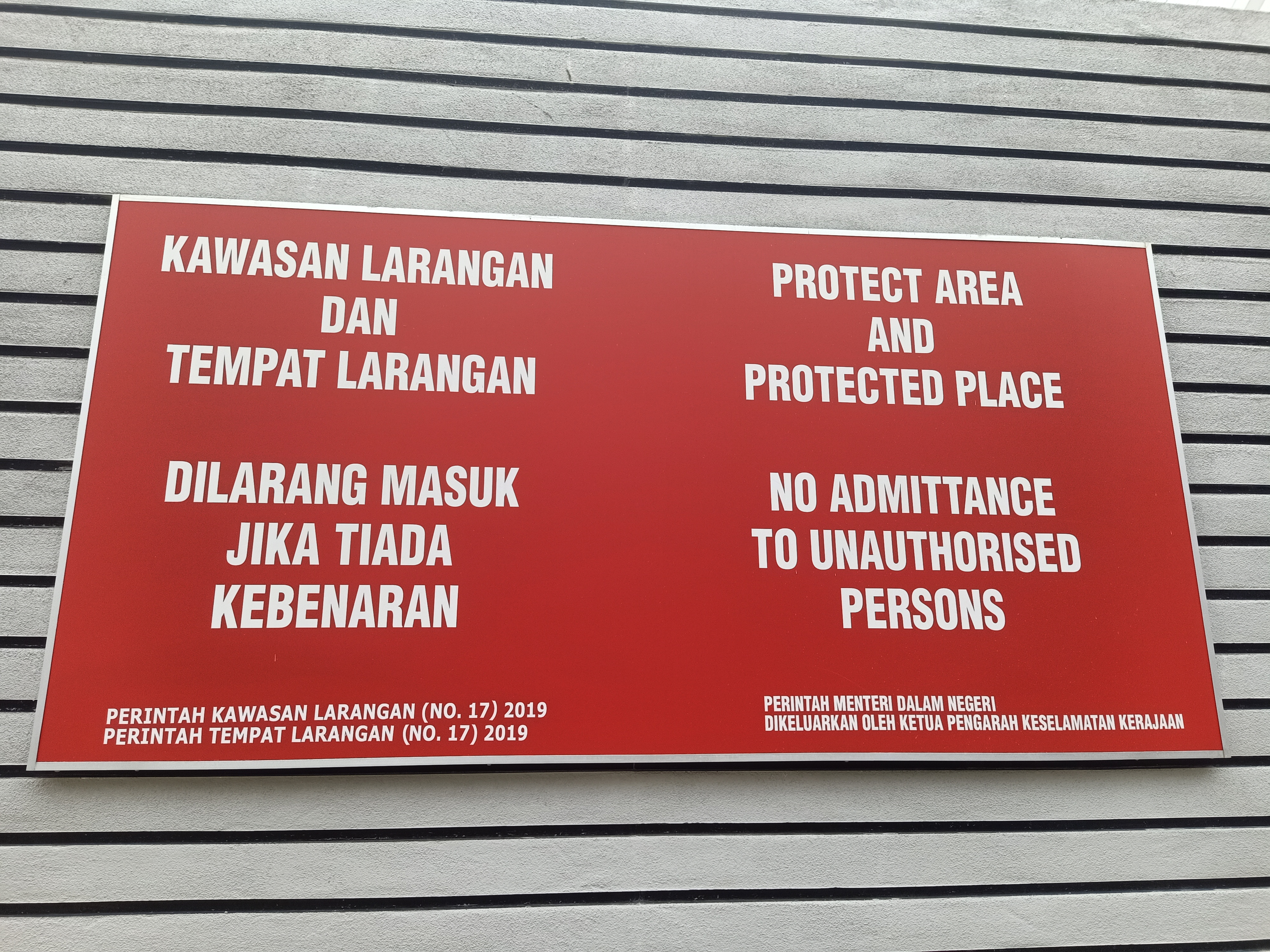
A warning sign at the KLCC Gas District Cooling plant, declaring that the plant is a protected area and protected place.

Under section 4, if the Home Minister thinks that there is a need to control the movement and conduct of persons within an area, he may declare such area as a "protected area".

Any person situated in the area are required to comply with the instructions of an authorized officer. Failure to comply may be subjected to removal from the area. Additionally, any person entering, wish to enter or is within the area may be subjected to a search, or detention for the purpose of search by an authorized officer.

=== Protected places ===
Under section 5, if the Home Minister thinks that it is necessary to take special precautions to prevent unauthorised entry into certain premises, he may declare such premises as a "protected place", and accordingly no person can remain within such places without a pass-card or permit issued by the authority for those places, or without permission from authorized officer on duty at the protected places.

Similar to section 4, even though a person has been granted permission to enter a protected place, he will still be subjected to instructions given by an authorized officer or an agent authorized by the premise owner. Further, an authorized officer and the agent acting on the premise owner behalf has the power to search any person entering, wish to enter, or within the protected place.

Failure to comply with the given instructions or searches may resulted in removal from the premises.

=== Penalty, and seizable & non-bailable offence ===
Under section 7, any person who failed to comply with section 4 or 5 are liable to imprisonment of a term of up to 2 years, or a fine of up to RM1,000, or to both. Furthermore, such offences are considered as seizable and non-bailable offence, in which violators can be arrested without warrant and would not be allowed to be granted bail.

=== "Three times challenge" ===
According to section 9, any person who attempts to enter or is within a protected area or protected place may be arrested by force, if he failed to stop after being challenged for 3 times by an authorized officer, and such force includes the use of lethal force, if necessary.

=== Defensive measures and prominent warning notices ===
Per section 10 of the Act, the Home Minister may take such necessary measures to protect a protected area or protected place, and such measures extend to the adoption of defensive measures that may involve a danger to life to any person entering or attempting to enter a protected area or protected place.

If a defensive measure has been put in place in a protected area or place, the Home Minister shall take necessary precautions to warn the public, such as display of prominent warning notices, to prevent unintentional or accidental entry to the said protected area or place. When such precautions and warning notices have been duly taken or implemented, no person will be entitled to any compensation or damage if one suffers injuries or death in consequence of an unauthorised entry into a protected area or place.

== Notable protected areas or places ==
- Kuala Lumpur International Airport (KLIA)
- Kota Kinabalu International Airport (KKIA)
- Spaces below Penang Bridge and Penang Second Bridge
- Malaysian Anti-Corruption Commission headquarters
- Istana Bukit Serene
- Istana Pasir Pelangi
- Durian Tunggal Dam
- Jus Dam
- Machap Dam
- Pengerang Integrated Petroleum Complex (PIPC)
- Perdana Putra
- Prime Minister's Department Complex
- 4th Battalion Border Regiment, Gerik

== See also ==
- Tresspassing
- Infrastructure
- Critical infrastructure

== External link ==
- The full text of Protected Areas and Protected Places Ordinance, 1959 at Wikisource
