= Malaysia Federal Route 140 =

Road in Malaysia

Federal Route 140

Route information
- Maintained by Malaysian Public Works Department
- Length: 12.70 km (7.89 mi)

Major junctions
- West end: Pantai Kundor
- FT 141 Federal Route 141; FT 5 Federal Route 5 FT 19 AMJ Highway
- East end: Cheng

Location
- Country: Malaysia
- Primary destinations: Tangga Batu, Bukit Rambai, Tanjung Minyak

Highway system
- Highways in Malaysia; Expressways; Federal; State

Federal Route 140 (formerly Malacca State Route M4) is a federal road in Malacca, Malaysia. It connects Pantai Kundor in the west to Cheng in the east. The Kilometre Zero of the Federal Route 140 starts at Pantai Kundor.

== Features ==
At most sections, the Federal Route 140 was built under the JKR R5 road standard, with a speed limit of 90 km/h.

== Junction lists ==
The entire route is located in Melaka Tengah District, Malacca.

Legend:

- I/C - Interchange, I/S - Intersection, RSA - Rest and service area, OBR - Overhead bridge restaurant, R/R - Restaurant and rest plaza, L/B - Layby, V/P - Vista point, TN - tunnel, T/P - Toll plaza, BR - Bridge
- C - Cloverleaf, S - Stack, T-A - Trumpet-A, T-B - Trumpet-B, DT - Directional-T/Y, SDT - Semi-Directional-T/Y, P-Y - Partial-Y, D - Diamond, P-C - Partial cloverleaf, D-D - Diverging diamond, D-R - Direct ramp

Location	km	mi	Name	Destinations	Notes
Pantai Kundor	0.0	0.0	Pantai Kundor	FT 141 Malaysia Federal Route 141 – Kampung Pantai Dusun, Pelabuhan Beruas, Tanjung Kling	T-junctions
Tangga Batu			Tangga Batu	FT 5 Malaysia Federal Route 5 – Port Dickson, Masjid Tanah, Sungai Udang, Malacca City, Tanjung Kling	Junctions
Tangga Batu			Sungai Udang bridge		
Bukit Rambai			Bukit Rambai	M11 Jalan Bukit Rambai – Ayer Salak, Paya Mengkuang	Dual T-junctions
Bukit Rambai			Sungai Ayer Salak bridge		
Tanjung Minyak			Tanjung Minyak	M6 Jalan Tanjung Minyak – Paya Mengkuang, Klebang, Tengkera	T-junctions
Tanjung Minyak			Sungai Ayer Salak bridge		
Cheng	12.70	7.89	Cheng	FT 19 AMJ Highway – Alor Gajah, Tampin, Malacca City, Batu Berendam, Muar; North–South Expressway Southern Route / AH2 – Kuala Lumpur, Johor Bahru	T-junctions
1.000 mi = 1.609 km; 1.000 km = 0.621 mi: Concurrency terminus; Route transition
