= Puteri Beach =

Beach in Tanjung Kling, Malacca, Malaysia

Puteri Beach Pantai Puteri (Malay)
- Beach
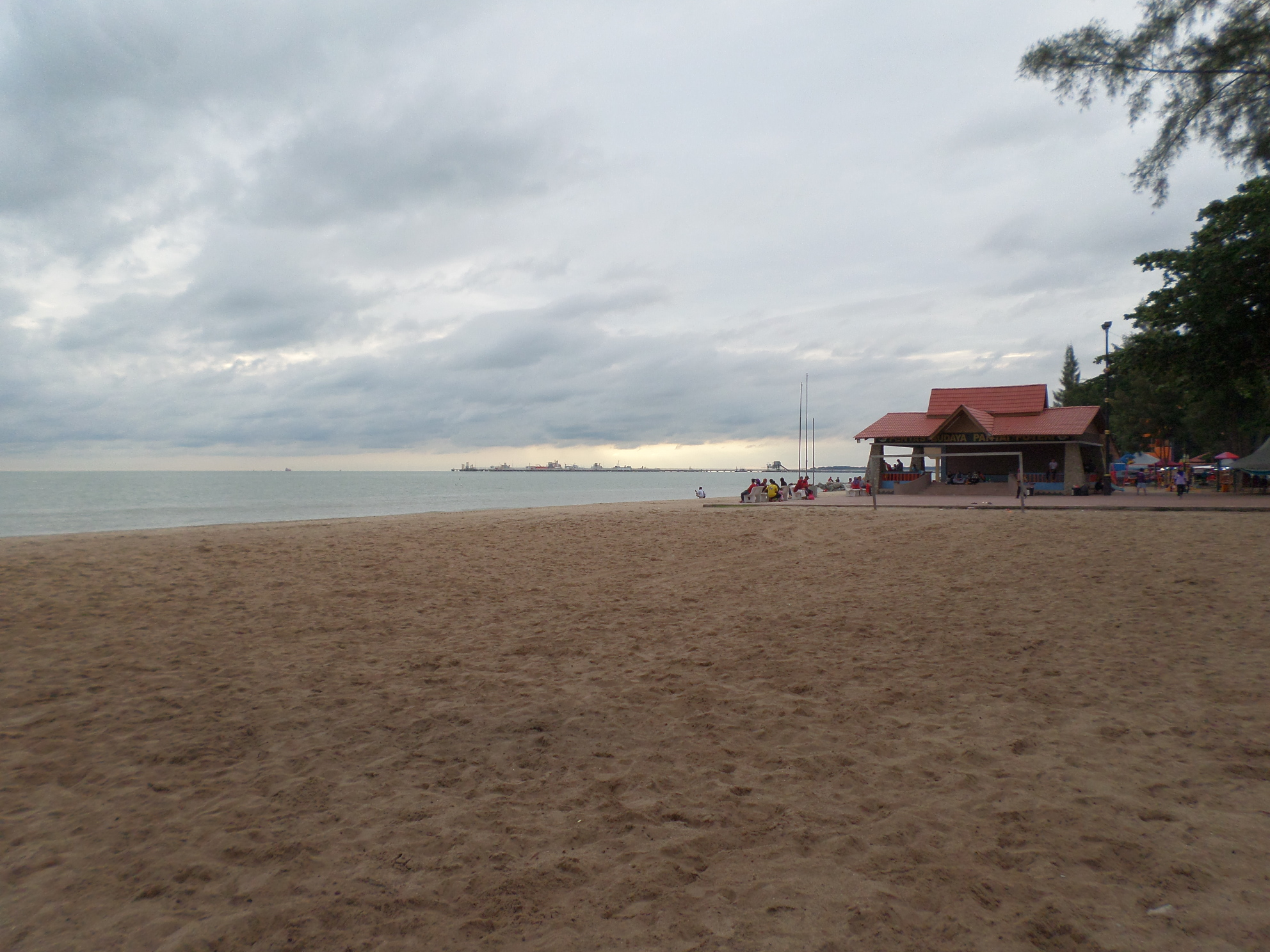
- Puteri Beach, looking north

- Coordinates: 2°13′50.6″N 102°08′50.6″E
- Location: Tanjung Kling, Malacca, Malaysia

Dimensions
  - Length: 2.1 km

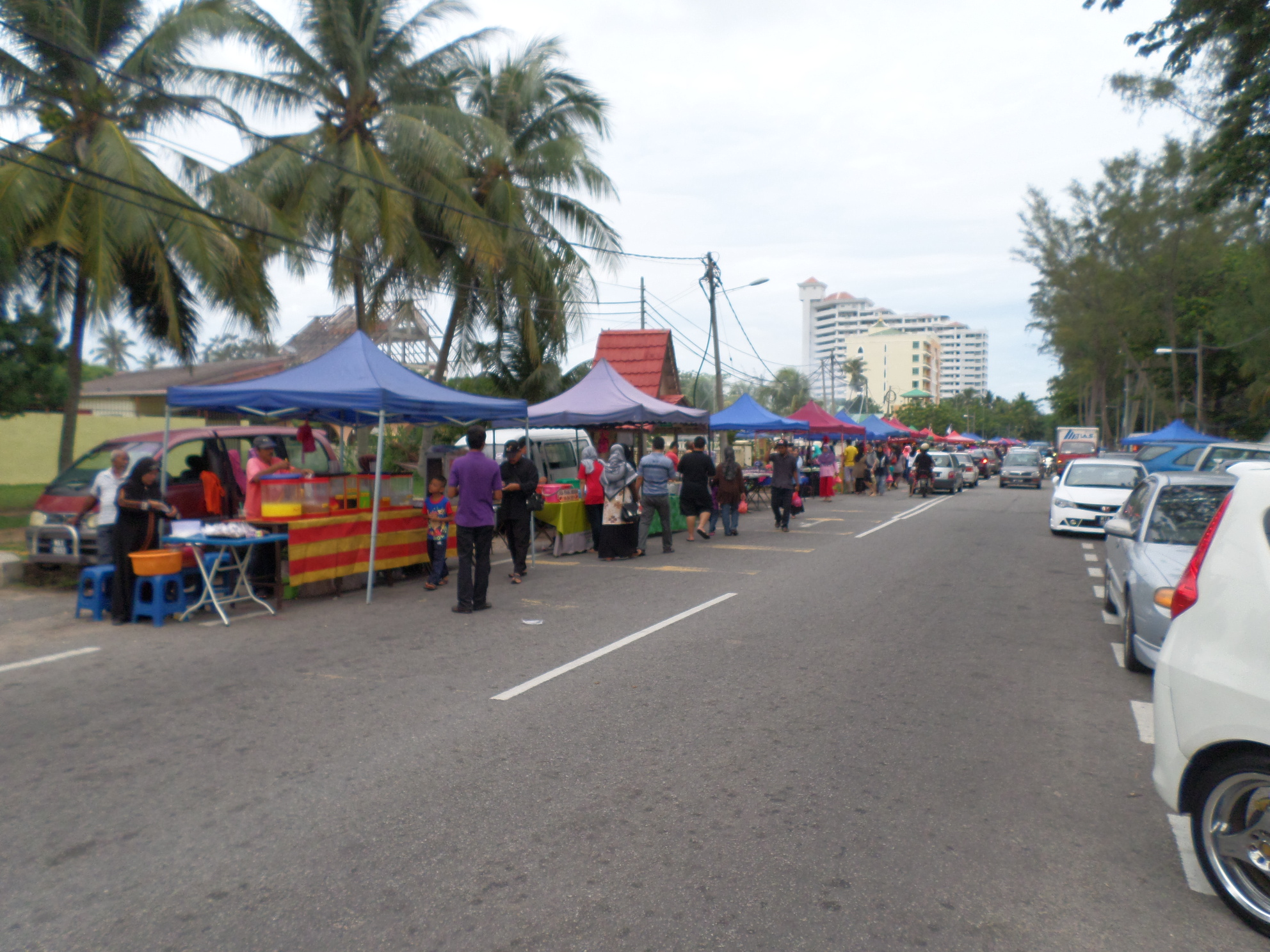
Puteri Beach night market

Puteri Beach (Malay: Pantai Puteri, lit. 'Princess Beach'), formerly Kundor Beach (Malay: Pantai Kundor) is a 2.1 km long beach in Tanjung Kling, Melaka Tengah District, Malacca, Malaysia. It has been developed as a seaside resort by the state government since the 1990s.

Various activities are found around the beach, ranging from angling, picnicking and camping. It also has night markets, hotels, food stalls and restaurants stretching along the road in parallel with the shoreline.

In April 2021, rock revetment was constructed along the beach to save it from coastal erosion which has spread over a length of 100 meters.

== See also ==
- Geography of Malaysia
- List of tourist attractions in Malacca
