= Jus Reservoir =

Reservoir in Jasin, Malacca, Malaysia

- Takungan Jus (Malay)
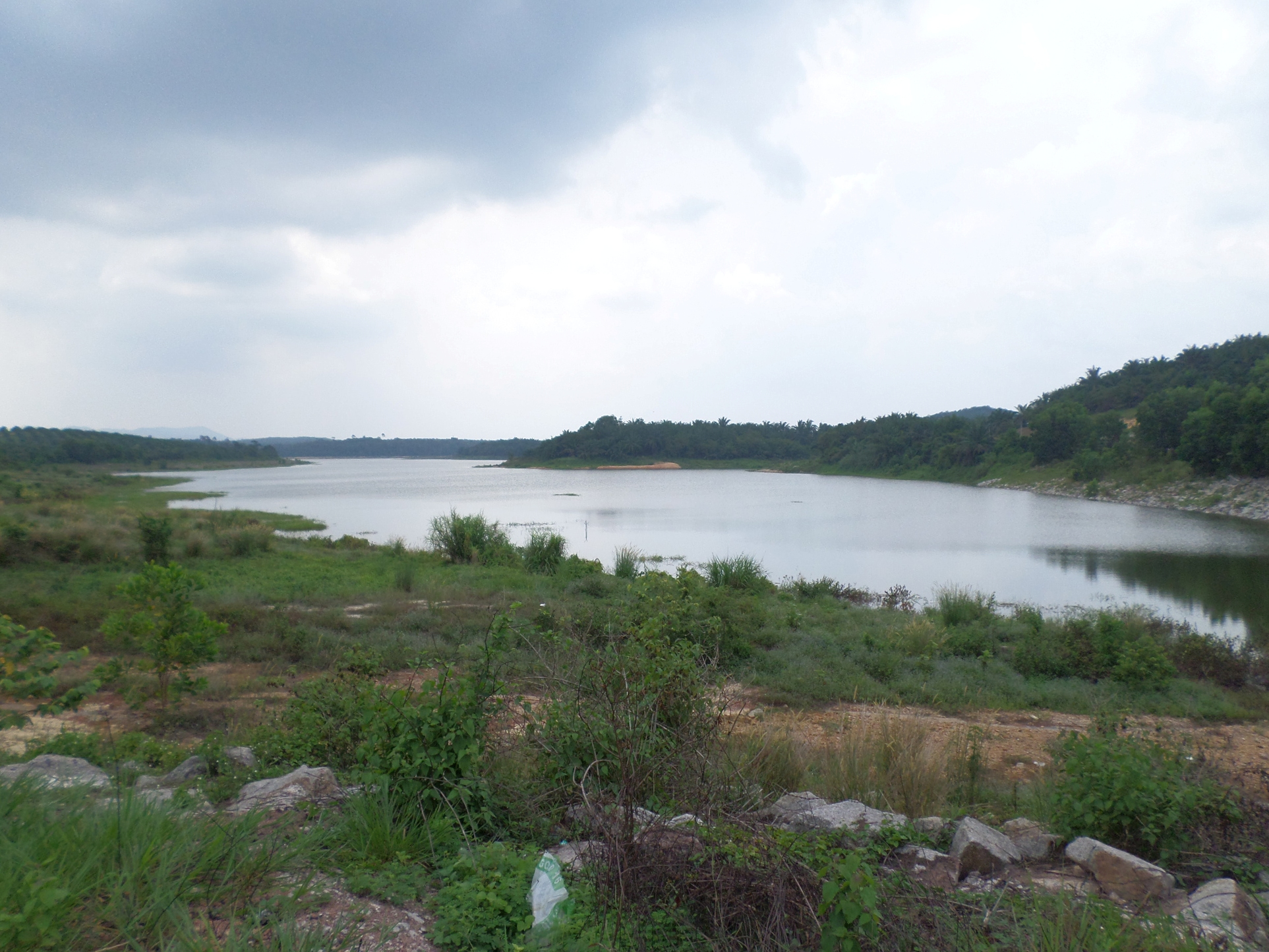

- Location within Malacca
- Location: Jasin, Malacca, Malaysia
- Coordinates: 2°26′25.9″N 102°23′01.4″E
- Type: reservoir
- Built: 2000
- First flooded: 2003
- Surface area: 5.5 square kilometres (2.1 sq mi)
- Water volume: 43,000,000,000 liters (9.5×10^{9} imp gal; 1.1×10^{10} U.S. gal)

The Jus Reservoir (Malay: Takungan Jus) is a reservoir located in Jasin District, Malacca, Malaysia. It was constructed in 2000 to address the water needs of Malacca and started operation in 2003. The dam is capable of storing 43 billion litres of water over an area of 5.5 km^{2} in an overall area of 23 km^{2}. The raw water supply for the reservoir is channeled from Durian Tunggal Reservoir, Kesang River and Batang Melaka River. The water from the reservoir goes to the water treatment facilities in Merlimau and Durian Tunggal.

== See also ==
- Geography of Malaysia
- List of tourist attractions in Malacca
