= Andre Filipe Desker =

Andre Filipe Desker (1826 – 9 March 1898), also known as Henry Filipe Desker, was one of the earliest butchers in Singapore and a prominent philanthropist.

== Early life ==
Desker was born in Malacca to Filipe Desker and Miguelina Sekelches in 1826. He was of Eurasian descent. The surname Desker may be an anglicised form of Desquer or De Sequeira, chosen as Portuguese Eurasians were not allowed business opportunities in early 19th century Malacca.

== Career ==
Desker came to Singapore in the 1840s and established Desker & Co., a butchery business on 1 June 1865. He was one of the earliest butchers on the island. It was advertised as "butchers intending to furnish residents with a regular supply of the best mutton." Situated in between Veerasamy Road and Norris Road in the 1860s, the slaughterhouse and butchery was the largest in Singapore. He owned several pens in which sheep from Australia were stored. He was "very successful" as a butcher. A correspondent with The Daily Advertiser wrote in December 1890 that his products were popular amongst those who preferred "quality to cheapness and inferiority."

Desker also owned five shophouses on Lembu Road, as well as the Desker's Plantation along Changi Road, which later became the Wing Loong Estate. He built six houses each on Queen Street and Waterloo Street in the 1880s.

== Personal life and death ==
Desker married Esmerelda Bruyns in 1853 in Singapore. Together, they had 13 children, including Hermogenes, the chief clerk of the Tanjong Pagar Dock Company. He lived in the area surrounding present-day Desker Road, which was named for him. His estate stretched from Cuff Road to Sungei Road, while the building in which he lived was located on Jalan Besar and demolished before the Japanese Occupation of Singapore. He was the great-grandfather of prominent diplomat Barry Desker. Desker was also a "well-known" philanthropist, donating to local Catholic schools and churches. He died on 9 March 1898 at his residence on Serangoon Road after having fallen ill two months ago.
