= Tanjung Kling =

- Town

Other transcription(s)
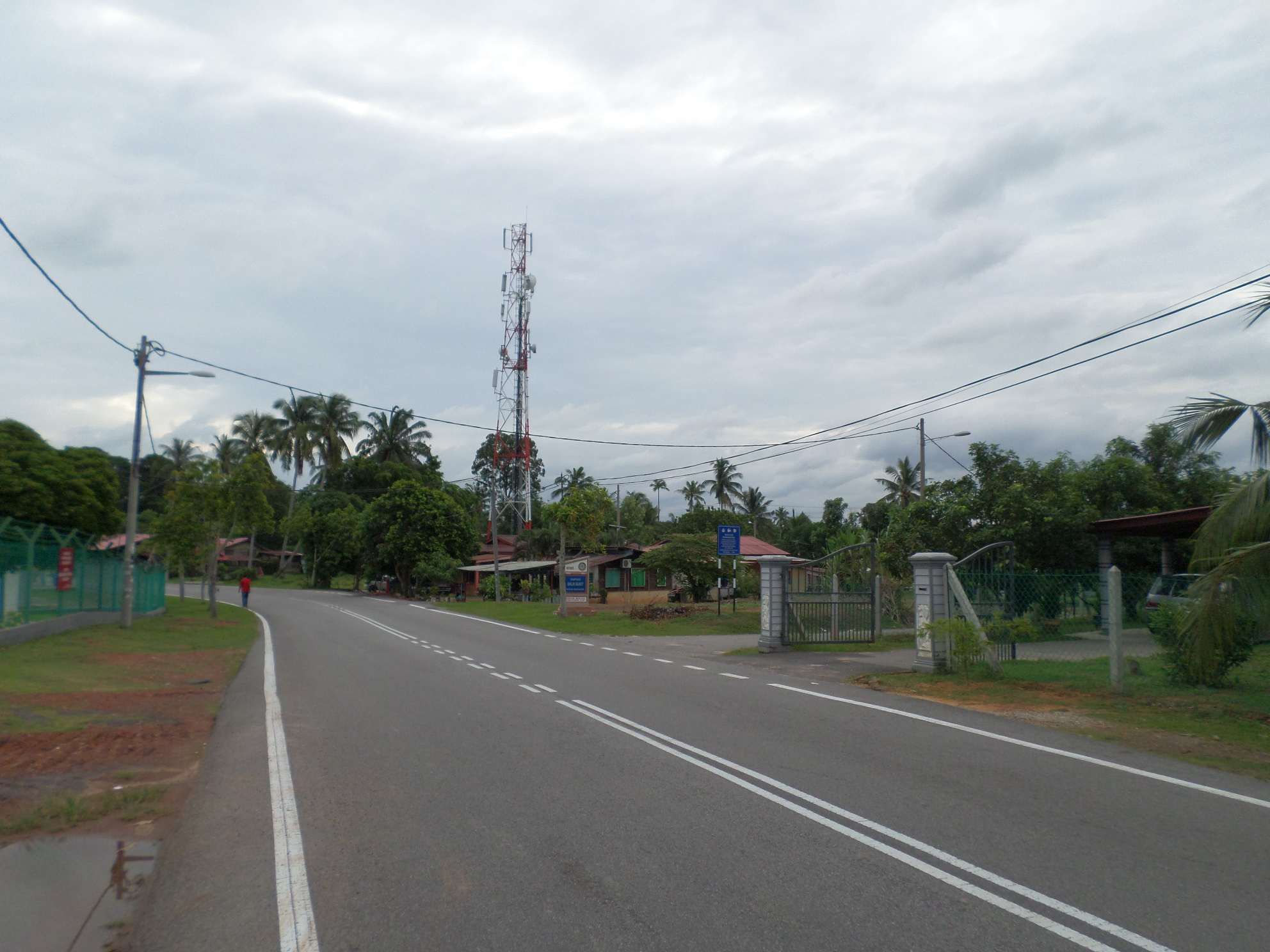
- Road in Tanjung Kling

- Location within Malacca
- State: Malacca
- City: Malacca City
- District: Melaka Tengah District
- Time zone: UTC+8 (MST)
  - Summer (DST): Not observed
- Postal code: 76400

Tanjung Kling in Melaka Tengah District

Tanjung Kling is a coastal mukim and town in Melaka Tengah District, in the Malaysian state of Malacca.

== Infrastructures ==
Image	Name	Description
	Tanjung Bruas Port	A port constructed in late 1970s and commenced operations in early 1980s to provide port facilities and services to the local business communities and to handle the exportation of hinterland goods as well as the importation of raw materials.
	Tanjung Kling Free Industrial Zone	Industrial Zone.
	Tanjung Kling Power Station	

== Tourist attractions ==
Image	Name	Description
	Hang Tuah Mausoleum	Mausoleum of Hang Tuah.
	Puteri Beach	Formerly known as Kundor Beach, literally means Princess Beach. A beach that stretches for 2.1 km along the shore facing the Strait of Malacca on the southwestern edge of Malacca.

== See also ==
- List of cities and towns in Malaysia by population
