= Pantai Kundor =

Pantai Kundor (N12)
Malacca constituency

State constituency
- Legislature: Malacca State Legislative Assembly
MLA
Tuminah Kadi
BN
- Constituency created: 2003
- First contested: 2004
- Last contested: 2026

Demographics
- Electors (2026): 20,855

N12 Pantai Kundor within Malacca, as used for the 2021 state election

Pantai Kundor is a state constituency in Malacca, Malaysia, that has been represented in the Malacca State Legislative Assembly.

The state constituency was first contested in 2004 and is mandated to return a single Assemblyman to the Malacca State Legislative Assembly under the first-past-the-post voting system. Since 2021, the State Assemblyman for Pantai Kundor is Mohd Hasim from the United Malays National Organisation (UMNO), which is part of the state's ruling coalition, Barisan Nasional (BN).

== Definition ==
The Pantai Kundor constituency contains the polling districts of Ayer Salak, Paya Luboh, Pantai Puteri, Kampung Gelam, Pengkalan Perigi, Pengkalan Lanjut and Sungai Lereh.

== Demographics ==
Ethnic breakdown of Pantai Kundor's electorate as of 2026
1. Malays (79.4%)
2. Chinese (15.3%)
3. Other Ethnicities (4.40%)
4. Indians (0.80%)

== History ==
=== Polling districts ===
According to the gazette issued on 5 November 2026, the Pantai Kundor constituency has a total of 7 polling districts.

State constituency	Polling districts	Code	Location
Pantai Kundor (N12)	Ayer Salak	136/12/01	SJK (C) St. Mary
Pantai Kundor (N12)	Paya Luboh	136/12/02	SK Tangga Batu
Pantai Kundor (N12)	Pantai Puteri	136/12/03	SK Pantai Kundor
Pantai Kundor (N12)	Kampung Gelam	136/12/04	SK Kampong Gelam
Pantai Kundor (N12)	Pengkalan Peringi	136/12/05	SRA (JAIM) Pantai Rombang
Pantai Kundor (N12)	Pengkalan Lanjut	136/12/06	SJK (C) Ek Te
Pantai Kundor (N12)	Sungai Lereh	136/12/07	SK Lereh

=== Representation history ===
Members of the Legislative Assembly for Pantai Kundor
Assembly	No	Years	Member	Party
Constituency created from Tangga Batu and Sungai Udang
11th	N12	2004 – 2008	Abdul Rahaman Kassim	BN (UMNO)
12th	N12	2008 – 2013	Ab Rahaman Ab Karim	BN (UMNO)
13th	N12	2013 – 2018	Ab Rahaman Ab Karim	BN (UMNO)
14th	N12	2018 – 2021	Nor Azman Hassan	BN (UMNO)
14th	N12	2021	Nor Azman Hassan	Independent
15th	N12	2021 – 2026	Tuminah Kadi	BN (UMNO)
16th	N12	2026 – present	Tuminah Kadi	BN (UMNO)

== Election results ==
Malacca state election, 2026: Pantai Kundor
Party	Candidate	Votes	%	∆%
BN	Tuminah Kadi	8,864	59.19	▲19.16
BERSATU	Asmah Samat	6,112	40.81	▲40.81
Total valid votes		14,976		
Total rejected ballots		154		
Unreturned ballots		30		
Turnout		15,160	72.69	▲7.58
Registered electors		20,855		
Majority		2,752	18.38	▲10.02
BN hold		Swing		
Source(s) https://electiondata.my/elections/mlk/SE-16/

Malacca state election, 2021: Pantai Kundor
Party	Candidate	Votes	%	∆%
BN	Tuminah Kadi	3,960	40.03	▼5.39
PN	Muhammad Rizuan Mustapha	3,133	31.67	▲31.67
PH	Nor Azman Hassan	2,799	28.30	▲28.30
Total valid votes		9,892		
Total rejected ballots		143		
Unreturned ballots		37		
Turnout		10,072	65.11	▼17.75
Registered electors		15,469		
Majority		827	8.36	▼2.29
BN hold		Swing		
Source(s) https://lom.agc.gov.my/ilims/upload/portal/akta/outputp/1715764/PUB%20583.pdf

Malacca state election, 2018: Pantai Kundor
Party	Candidate	Votes	%	∆%
BN	Nor Azman Hassan	5,773	45.42	▼18.33
PKR	Juhari Osman	5,001	39.35	▲39.35
PAS	Abdul Halim Maidin	1,936	15.23	▼21.02
Total valid votes		12,710	100.00	
Total rejected ballots		256		
Unreturned ballots		32		
Turnout		12,998	82.86	▼3.68
Registered electors		15,686		
Majority		772	6.07	▼21.43
BN hold		Swing		

Malacca state election, 2013: Pantai Kundor
Party	Candidate	Votes	%	∆%
BN	Ab Rahaman Ab Karim	7,101	63.75	▼5.37
PAS	Mohd Noor Omar	4,037	36.25	▲5.37
Total valid votes		11,138	100.00	
Total rejected ballots		180		
Unreturned ballots		0		
Turnout		11,318	86.54	▲8.73
Registered electors		13,079		
Majority		3,064	27.50	▼10.74
BN hold		Swing		
Source(s) "Federal Government Gazette - Notice of Contested Election, State Legislative Assembly for the State of Selangor [P.U. (B) 192/2013]" (PDF). Attorney General's Chambers of Malaysia. 26 April 2013. Archived from the original (PDF) on 29 December 2019. "Federal Government Gazette - Results of Contested Election and Statements of the Poll after the Official Addition of Votes, State Constituencies for the State of Selangor [P.U. (B) 233/2013]" (PDF). Attorney General's Chambers of Malaysia. 22 May 2013. Archived from the original (PDF) on 2 October 2018.

Malacca state election, 2008: Pantai Kundor
Party	Candidate	Votes	%	∆%
BN	Ab Rahaman Ab Karim	5,816	69.12	▼4.53
PAS	Kamis Saat	3,283	30.88	▲4.53
Total valid votes		9,099	100.00	
Total rejected ballots		152		
Unreturned ballots		0		
Turnout		9,251	77.81	▼1.14
Registered electors		11,889		
Majority		2,533	38.24	▼9.06
BN hold		Swing		

Malacca state election, 2004: Pantai Kundor
Party	Candidate	Votes	%
BN	Abdul Rahaman Kassim	6,466	73.65
PAS	Mohamad Burok	2,314	26.35
Total valid votes		8,780	100.00
Total rejected ballots		135	
Unreturned ballots		0	
Turnout		8,915	78.95
Registered electors		11,292	
Majority		4,152	47.30
This was a new constituency created.
