= Hang Tuah Mausoleum =

Mausoleum in Melaka Tengah, Malacca, Malaysia

- Makam Hang Tuah
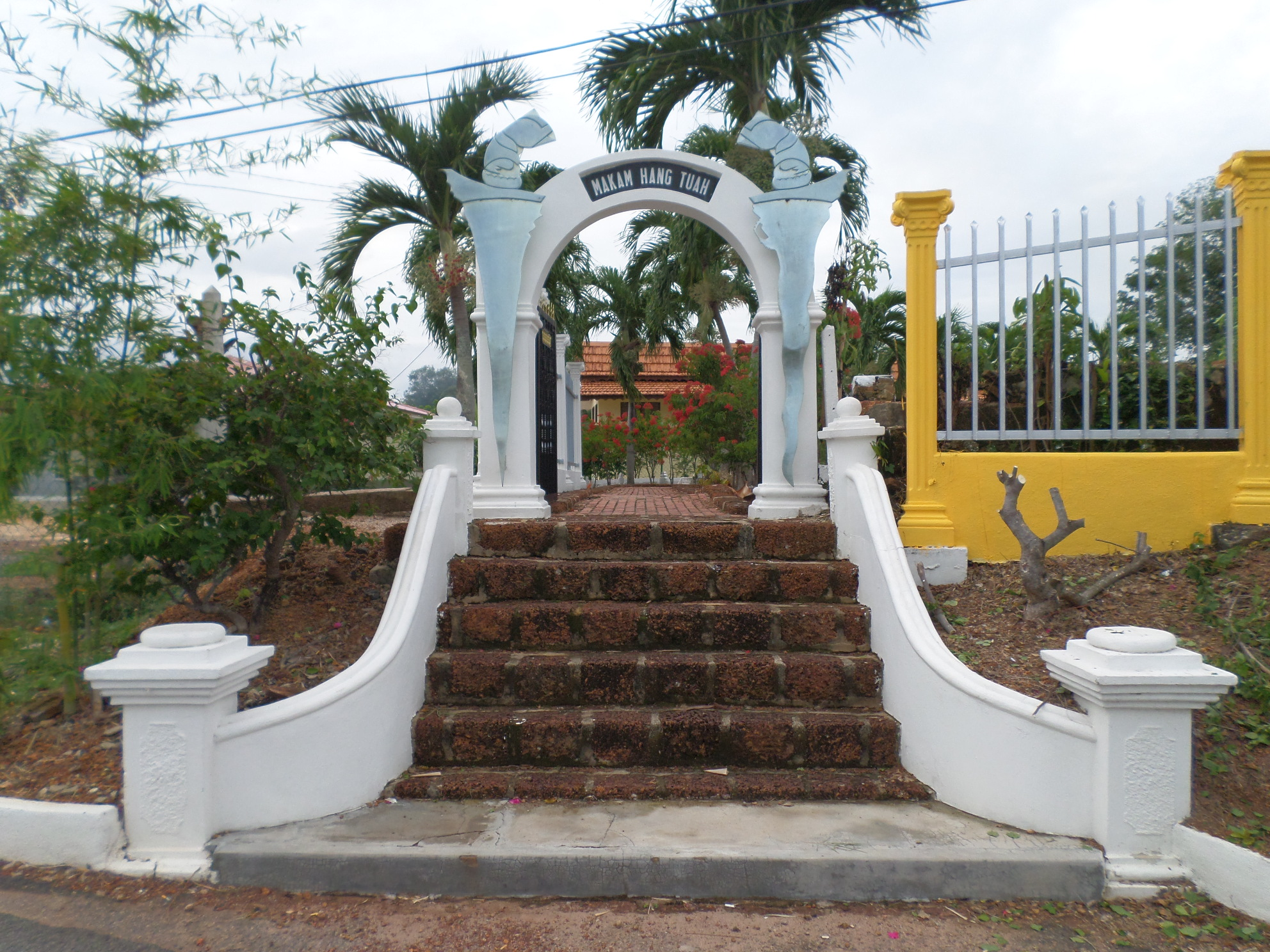
- Interactive map of Hang Tuah Mausoleum

Details
- Location: Tanjung Kling, Malacca, Malaysia
- Coordinates: 2°13′05.5″N 102°09′32.1″E
- Type: mausoleum

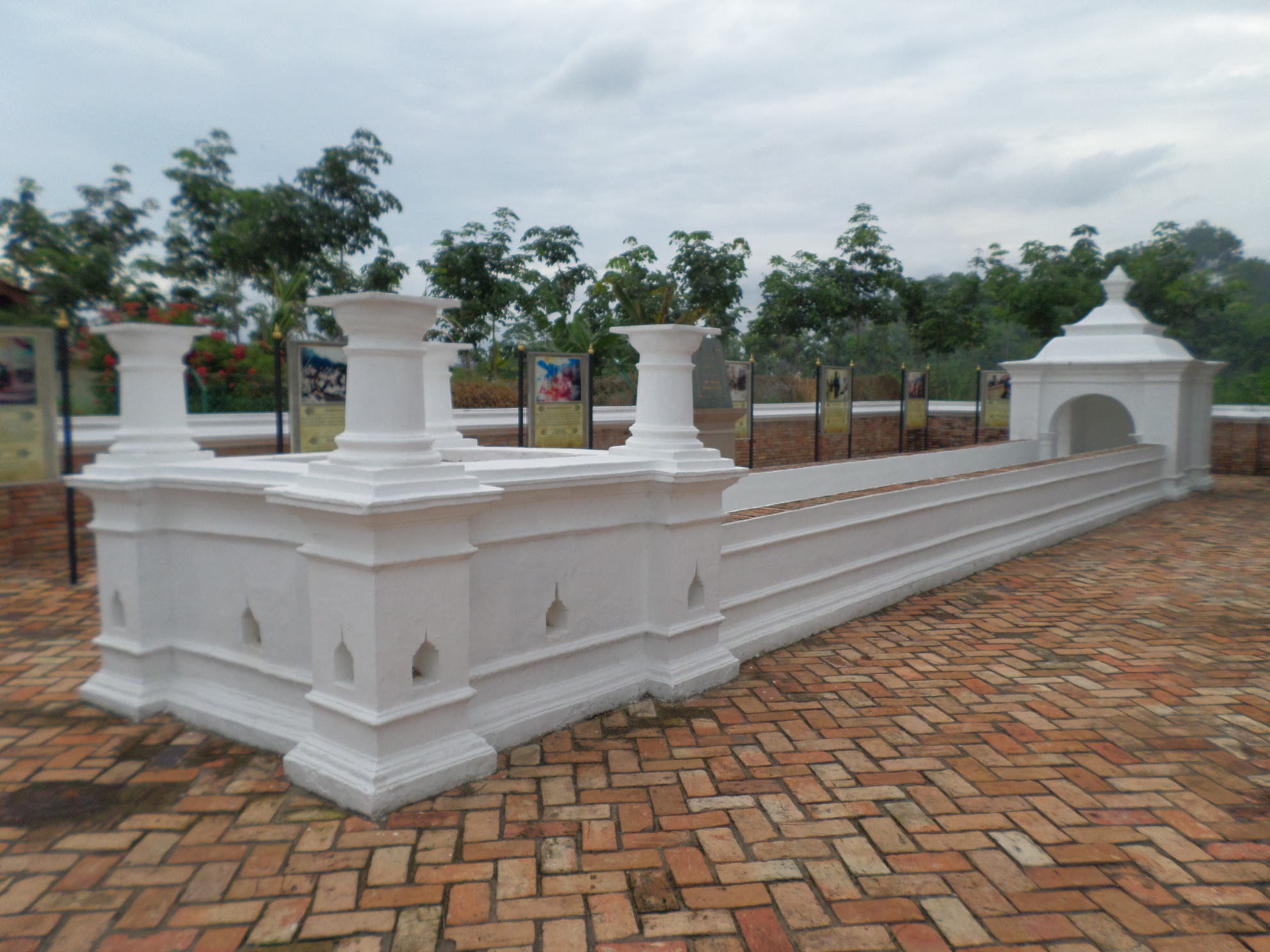
Hang Tuah tomb

Hang Tuah Mausoleum (Malay: Makam Hang Tuah) is a mausoleum located in Tanjung Kling, Malacca, Malaysia.

== See also ==
- List of tourist attractions in Malacca
- Hang Tuah's Well
