= Tanjung Kling Power Station =

Power station in Central Melaka, Melaka, Malaysia

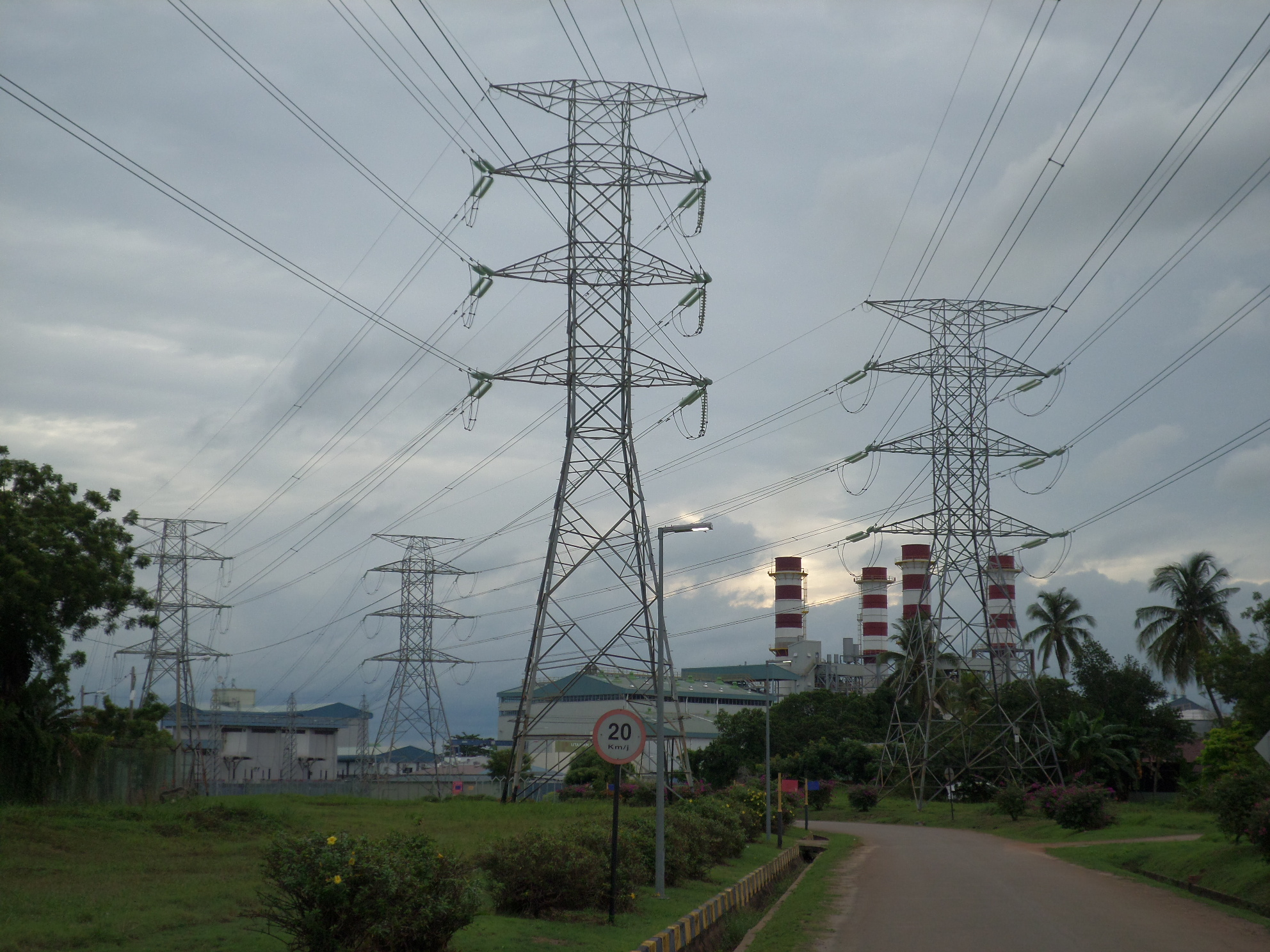
- Tanjung Kling Power Station
- Official name: Tanjung Kling Power Station
- Country: Malaysia
- Location: Tanjung Kling, Malacca
- Coordinates: 2°13′24″N 102°9′7″E
- Status: Operational
- Commission date: 1999
- Decommission date: August 2020
- Operator: Tenaga Nasional Berhad (TNB) (1999-present)

Thermal power station
- Primary fuel: Gas

Power generation
- Nameplate capacity: 330 MW

External links
- Commons: Related media on Commons

The Tanjung Kling Power Station is one of the oldest power stations operating in Malaysia. It went into commercial operation on 6 August 1999 and is located in Tanjung Kling, Malacca. The station is a thermal combined-cycle gas turbine plant.

== See also ==
- List of power stations in Malaysia
