= Durian Tunggal Reservoir =

Reservoir in Alor Galah, Malacca, Malaysia

- Takungan Durian Tunggal (Malay)
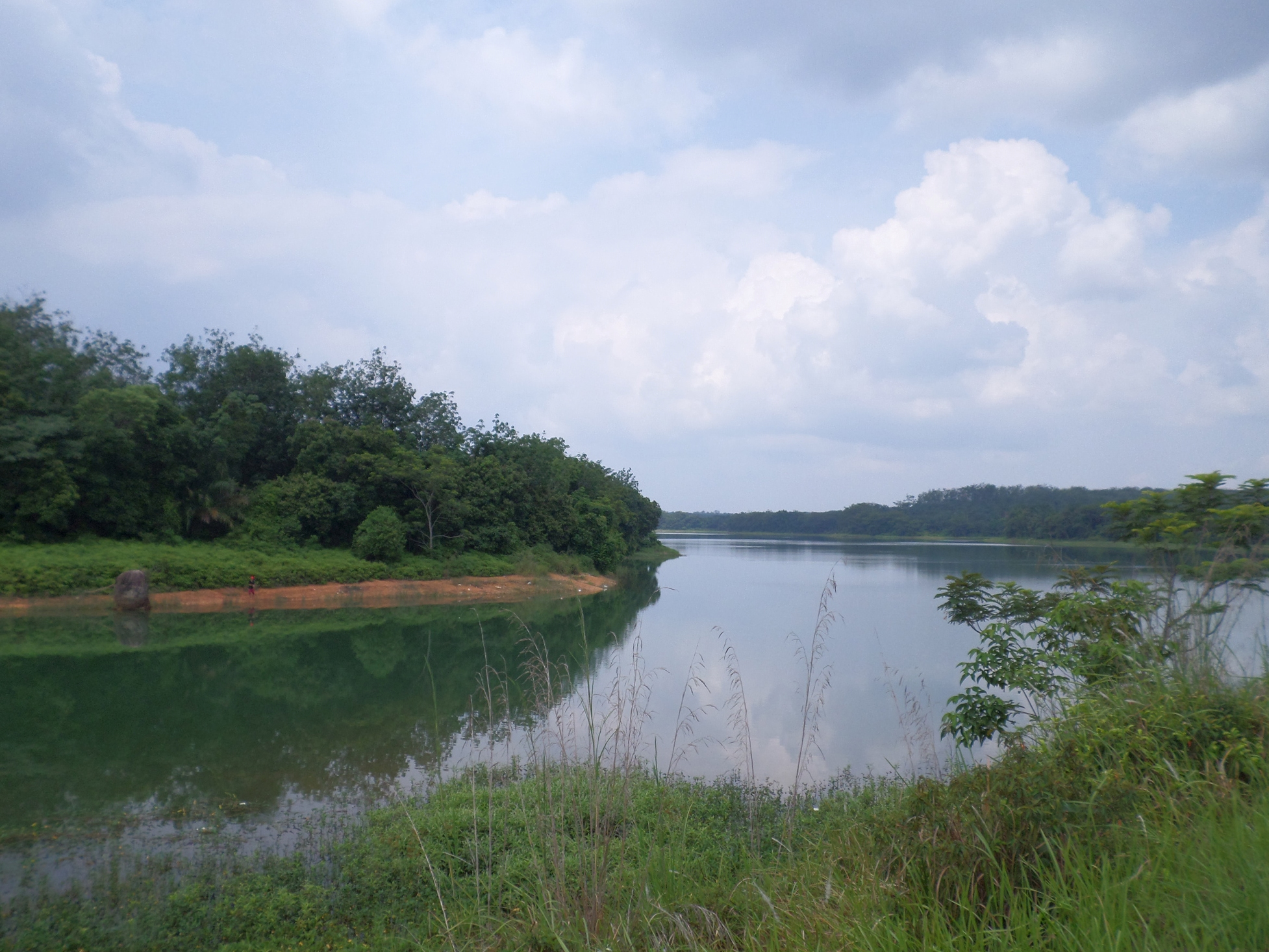

- Location within Malacca
- Location: Alor Gajah, Malacca, Malaysia
- Coordinates: 2°21′18.4″N 102°18′58.4″E
- Type: reservoir
- Primary inflows: Malacca River
- Built: 1976
- Water volume: 32,600,000 cubic metres (26,400 acre⋅ft)

The Durian Tunggal Reservoir (Malay: Takungan Durian Tunggal) is a reservoir in Alor Gajah District in the Malaysian state of Malacca, serving as the main source of water supply to its residents. It has a capacity of 32,600,000 cubic metres (26,400 acre⋅ft) with inflow from Malacca River.

== History ==
The construction of the reservoir started in 1974 and was completed in 1976.

== See also ==
- Geography of Malaysia
- List of tourist attractions in Malacca
