= Malacca =

State of Malaysia

Malacca Melaka
- State
- Historic State of Malacca; Melaka Negeri Bersejarah (Malay)
- Flag Coat of arms
- Nickname(s): Negeri Bersejarah "The Historic State"
- Motto: Bersatu Teguh "Firmly United"
- Anthem: Melaka Maju Jaya "Malacca, Onwards Come!"
- Malacca in Malaysia
- Country: Malaysia
- Malacca Sultanate: 15th century
- Portuguese control: 24 August 1511
- Dutch control: 14 January 1641
- British control: 17 March 1824
- Japanese occupation: 11 January 1942
- Malayan Union: 1 April 1946
- Federation of Malaya independence: 31 August 1957
- Proclamation of Malaysia: 16 September 1963
- Capital and largest city: Malacca City^{[a]} 2°12′N 102°15′E
- Ethnic groups (2020): 66.6% Bumiputera; 65.5% Malay; 1.1% indigenous groups from Sabah and Sarawak; 20.6% Chinese; 5.2% Indian; 0.5% Other ethnicities; 7.1% Non-citizens
- Religion (2020): 68.9% Sunni Islam (official); 19.2% Buddhism; 5.3% Hinduism; 2.6% Christianity; 0.5% Other religions; 3.5% No religion
- Demonym(s): Malaccan
- Government: Parliamentary
  - Yang di-Pertua Negeri: Mohd Ali Rustam
  - Chief Minister: Ab Rauf Yusoh (BN–UMNO)
- Legislature: Legislative Assembly

Area
  - Total: 1,746.60 km^{2} (674.37 sq mi) (11th)
- Highest elevation (Bukit Gapis): 512 m (1,680 ft)

Population
  - 2023 census: 1,027,500
  - Density: 588/km^{2} (1,522.9/sq mi) (6th)
- GDP (PPP): 2023 estimate
  - Total: $38.745 billion (11th)
  - Per capita: $37,708 (6th)
- GDP (nominal): 2023 estimate
  - Total: $12.150 billion (11th)
  - Per capita: $11,825 (6th)
- Gini (2022): ▼0.370 low
- HDI (2024): ▲0.829 very high · 6th
- Currency: Malaysian ringgit (RM/MYR)
- Time zone: UTC+8 (Malaysian Time)
- Date format: dd-mm-yyyy
- Driving side: Left
- Calling code: +606-2, +606-3, +606-5
- Postal code: 75xxx to 78xxx
- ISO 3166 code: MY-04
- Website: www.melaka.gov.my
- ^[a]Ayer Keroh, Hang Tuah Jaya is the state administrative centre and the seat of the Malacca state government (executive branch & legislative branch). However, Malacca City remains the official capital of the Malacca state.

Malacca (Malay: Melaka), officially the Historic State of Malacca (Malay: Melaka Negeri Bersejarah), is a state in Malaysia located in the southern region of the Malay Peninsula, facing the Strait of Malacca. The state is bordered by Negeri Sembilan to the north and west and Johor to the south and east. The exclave of Tanjung Tuan borders Negeri Sembilan to the north. Its capital is Malacca City, which was inscribed as a UNESCO World Heritage Site alongside George Town in 2008.

The state covers a gazetted land area of 1,746.60 km^{2} (674.37 sq mi) (174,660 hectares) distributed across 155 cadastral mukims. When incorporating statutory coastal waters out to 3 nautical miles (50,587.01 ha) and a 200-metre seaward baseline shift (2,814.57 ha), the state's total spatial planning envelope covers 228,061.58 hectares (2,280.62 km²). Situated immediately south of the Titiwangsa Mountains, Malacca is predominantly lowland plain, with Bukit Gapis (512 metres) serving as its highest point.

Although Malacca was the location of one of the earliest Malay sultanates, the Malacca Sultanate, the local monarchy was abolished when the Portuguese conquered it in 1511. The head of state is the Yang di-Pertua Negeri or Governor, rather than a sultan. Malacca occupies a strategic position on international maritime routes along the Strait of Malacca, serving as an important center for manufacturing, maritime transport, and cultural tourism. The state's diverse population includes Malays, Chinese, Indians, Baba Nyonya, Kristang, Chitty, Temuan, and Eurasians.

== Etymology ==
The state's name dates to a popular legend surrounding the founding of the Malacca Sultanate by Parameswara, who sought a new location to establish a kingdom after fleeing a Majapahit invasion of Singapura. As the story goes, Parameswara was resting under a Malacca tree (Malay: pokok melaka) near a river during a hunt, when one of his dogs cornered a mouse deer. In self-defence, the mouse deer pushed the dog into the river. Impressed by the courage of the deer, and taking it as a good omen of the weak overcoming the powerful, Parameswara decided then to found an empire at that spot. He named this empire after the tree where he had just taken shelter. This story shows similarities with folk-tales from Kandy, Sri Lanka, and Pasai, Sumatra.

The "Malacca tree" was taken as a basis for the species Phyllanthus emblica named by Carl Linnaeus in 1753 through Latinising its original Sanskrit name आमलक (āmalaka). The species has since been planted as an ornamental in various state attractions. However, some researchers like those of the Forestry Research Institute of Malaysia speculate that the legendary namesake tree might have been the species Phyllanthus pectinatus endemic to Malay Archipelago forests which superficially resembles P. emblica.

Another account claims that during the reign of Muhammad Shah (1424–1444), Arab merchants called the kingdom 'Malakat' (Arabic for 'congregation of merchants') because it was home to many trading communities. One theory suggests, as mentioned in the Suma Oriental by Tomé Pires, that it is derived from the Javanese terms melayu or mlayu (to steadily accelerate or to run), to describe the strong current of a river in Sumatra that today bears the name Sungai Melayu ('Melayu river').

== History ==
Historical affiliations

Portuguese Malacca 1511–1641
Dutch East India Company 1641–1795
Dutch East Indies 1818–1825
British Straits Settlements 1825–1946
Crown Colony of Malacca 1946–1957
Federation of Malaya 1957–1963
Malaysia 1963–present

=== Sultanate of Malacca ===
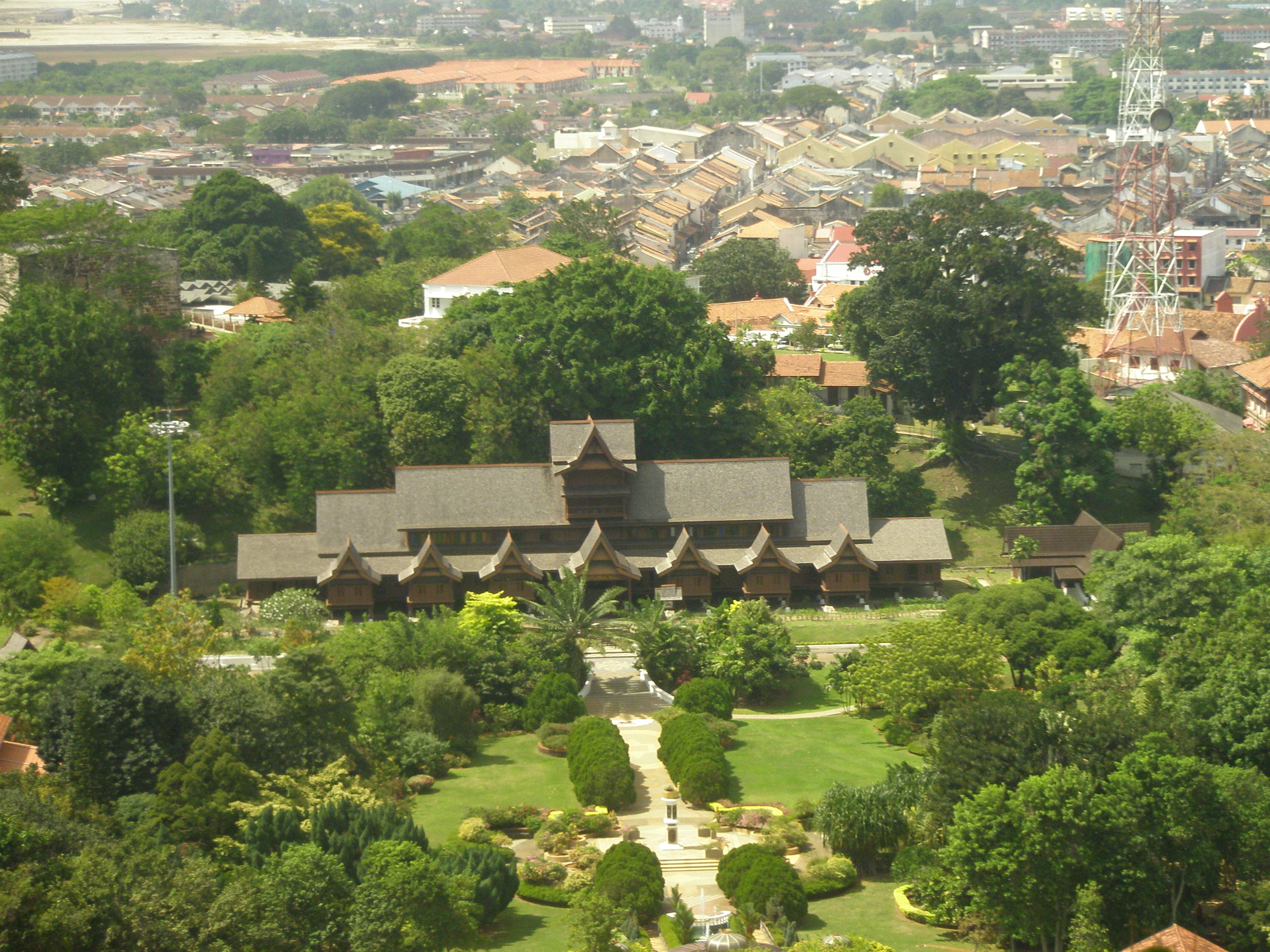
Malacca Sultanate Palace Museum, a reconstruction of the palace of the Malacca Sultanate

Before the arrival of the first sultan, the area that is now Malacca was a fishing village. Malacca was founded by Parameswara, also known as Iskandar Shah, after discovering a port accessible in all seasons at a narrow point of the Strait of Malacca. In collaboration with the Orang Laut ("sea people"), he established Malacca as an international port by requiring passing ships to call there and establishing facilities for warehousing and trade.

In 1403, the first official Chinese trade envoy, led by Admiral Yin Qing, arrived in Malacca. Later, Parameswara was escorted by Zheng He and other envoys in his visits. Malacca's relationship with Ming China granted it protection from attacks by Siam and Majapahit, and the settlement submitted to Ming China as a protectorate. This encouraged the development of Malacca into a trade centre between China, India, the Middle East, Africa, and Europe.

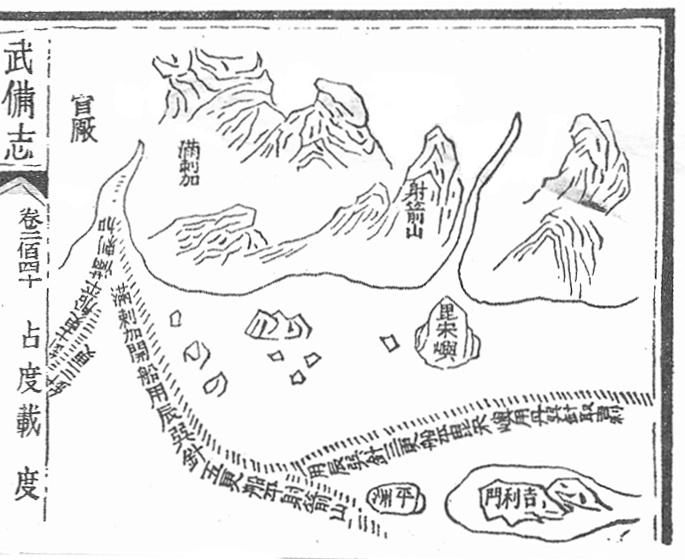
Mao Kun map, from Wubei Zhi, based on the 15th-century maps of Zheng He's voyages, showing Malacca (滿剌加) near the top left

During the early 15th century, Ming China built in Malacca a commercial hub and an operations base for its treasure voyages into the Indian Ocean. Malacca had been a relatively minor settlement prior to the voyages and paid tribute to Siam. In 1405, the Ming court dispatched Admiral Zheng He with a stone tablet enfeoffing the Western Mountain of Malacca, as well as an imperial order elevating the status of the port to a country. The Chinese also established a fortified government depot (官廠) for their personnel. Early rulers of Malacca—Parameswara, Megat Iskandar Shah, and Sri Maharaja—used diplomacy with Ming China to establish security against external rivals.

According to Malaccan tradition, Hang Li Po, associated in local chronicles with the Ming imperial court, arrived in Malacca with 500 attendants to marry Sultan Mansur Shah (reigned 1456–1477). Her entourage settled primarily in Bukit Cina.

=== Colonial era ===
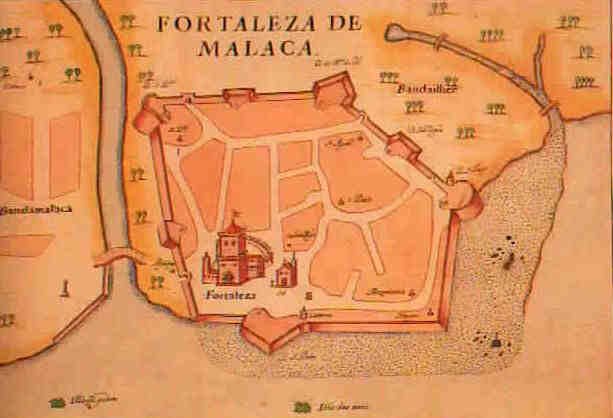
1630 map of the Portuguese fort and city of Malacca

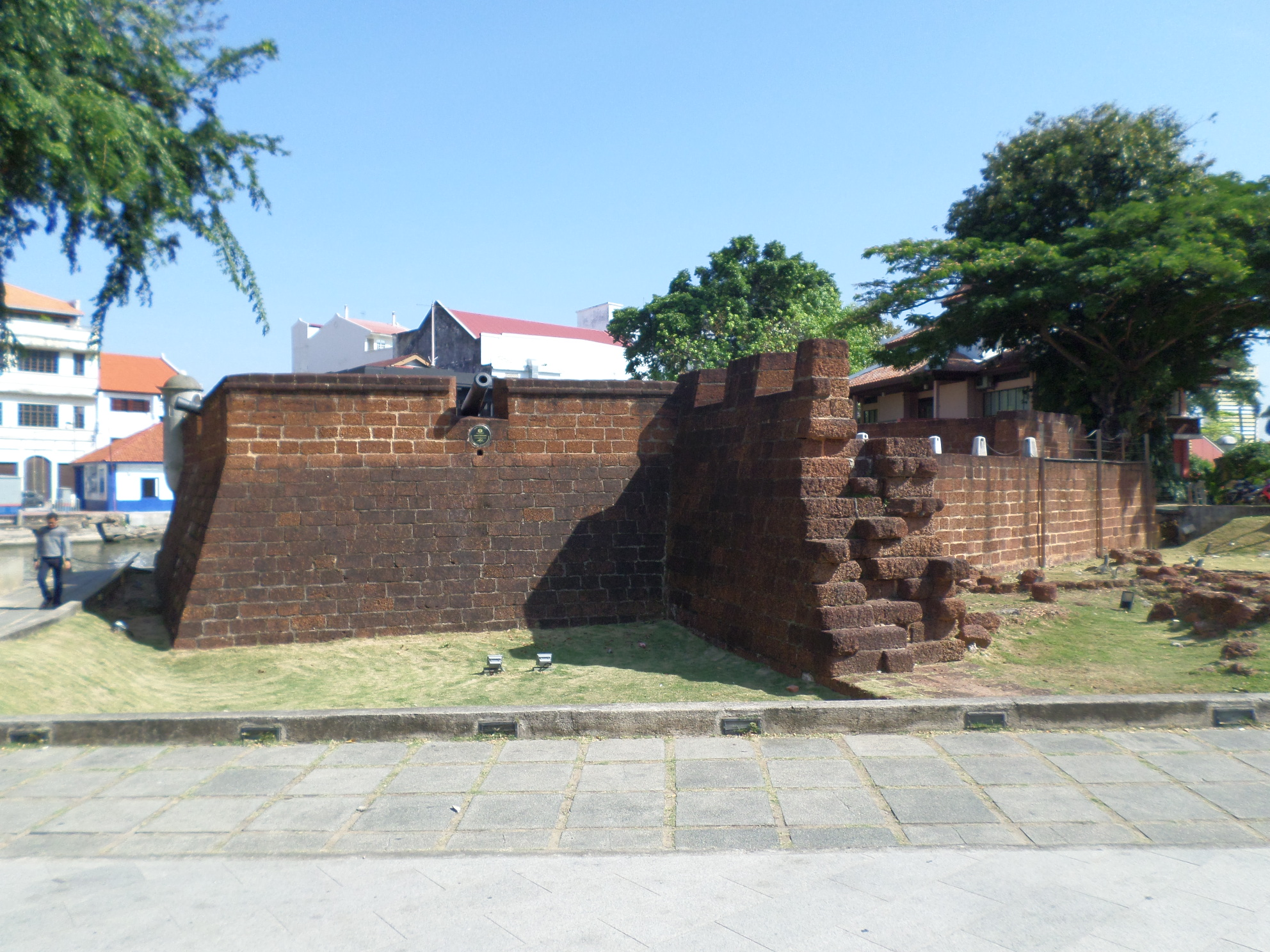
The Middelburg Bastion, constructed in 1660 during Dutch rule, situated at the mouth of the Malacca River

In April 1511, Afonso de Albuquerque sailed from Goa to Malacca with approximately 1,200 men and 17 or 18 ships. The Portuguese conquered the city on 24 August 1511.

Portuguese control of Malacca did not lead to complete control of regional maritime commerce, as trade became dispersed among rival regional ports such as Aceh and Johor.

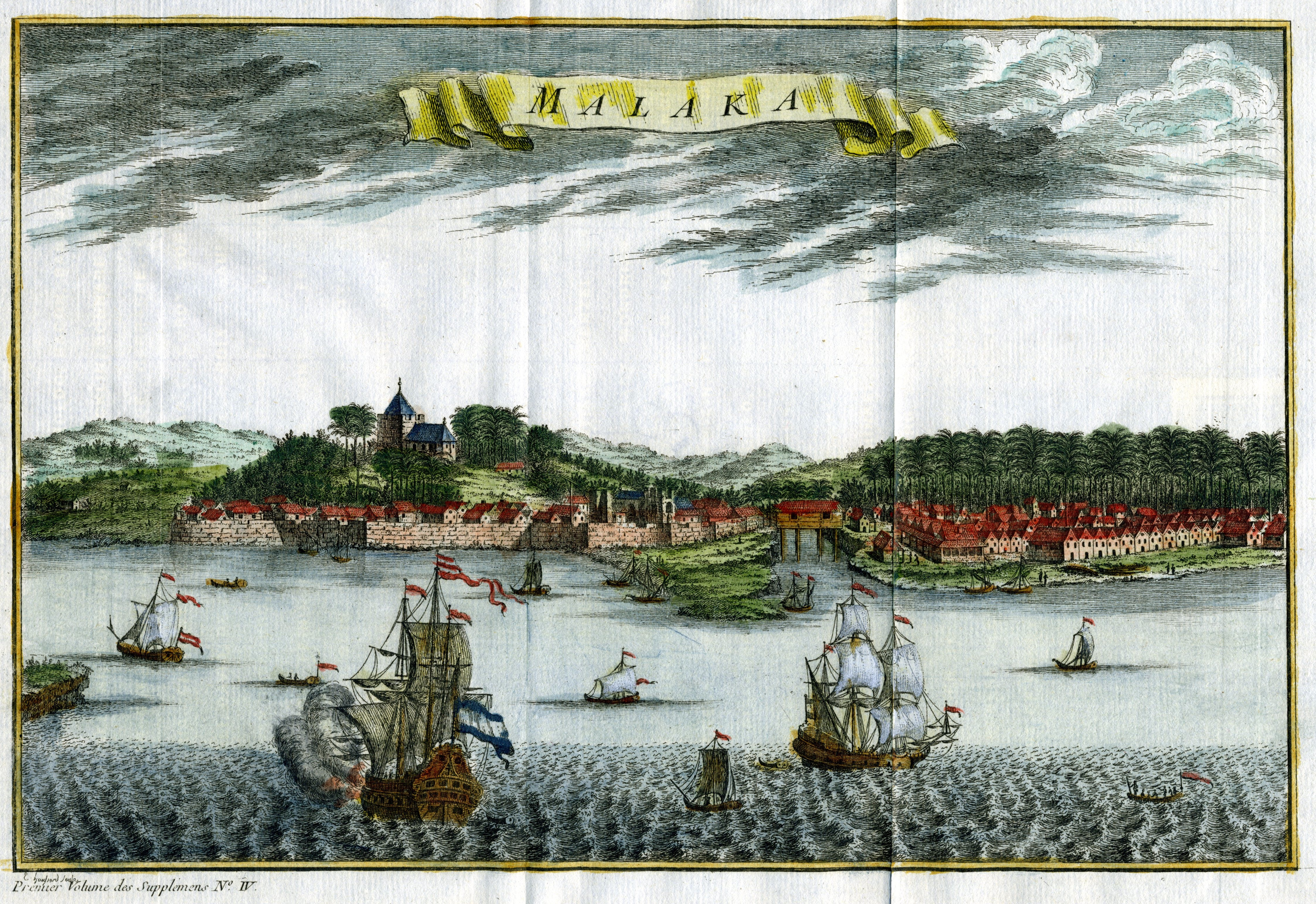
Dutch Malacca, c. 1750

The Jesuit missionary Francis Xavier visited Malacca in 1545, 1546, and 1549. In the early 17th century, the Dutch East India Company (VOC), allied with the Johor Sultanate, contested Portuguese authority in the region. On 14 January 1641, Dutch forces captured Malacca following a protracted siege. The Dutch administered Malacca until the late 18th century, maintaining it alongside their primary administrative base in Batavia (Jakarta). Notable surviving architecture from this era includes the Stadthuys civic building.

Malacca was transferred to the British under the terms of the Anglo-Dutch Treaty of 1824 in exchange for Bencoolen in Sumatra. British authority encountered localized resistance, notably during the Naning War (1831–1832) led by local chieftain Dol Said. Malacca subsequently became part of the Straits Settlements alongside Singapore and Penang, governed by the British East India Company and later directly as a Crown colony. During World War II, Malacca fell under Japanese military administration between 1942 and 1945.

=== Post-colonial era ===
Following the war, the British dissolved the Straits Settlements and placed Malacca under the Malayan Union in 1946, which was reconstituted as the Federation of Malaya in 1948. On 20 February 1956, Chief Minister Tunku Abdul Rahman announced Malaya's upcoming independence at Padang Pahlawan in Bandar Hilir, Malacca, ahead of formal independence on 31 August 1957. Malacca became a constituent state of Malaysia upon its formation on 16 September 1963.

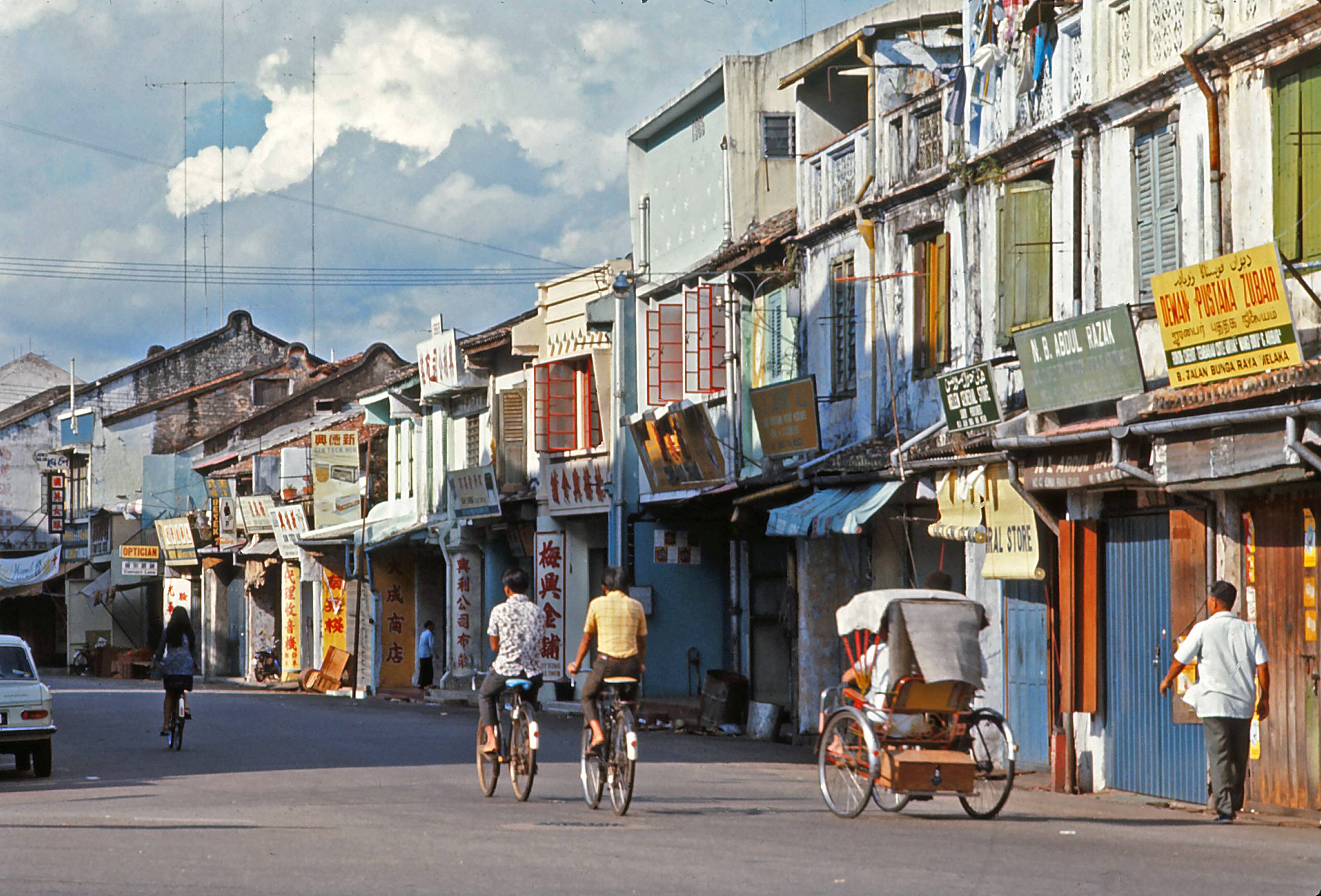
Malacca in 1971

The capital, Malacca City, was declared a historical city on 15 April 1989 and granted city status on 15 April 2003. Its historic core was inscribed as a UNESCO World Heritage Site on 7 July 2008.

== Geography and climate ==
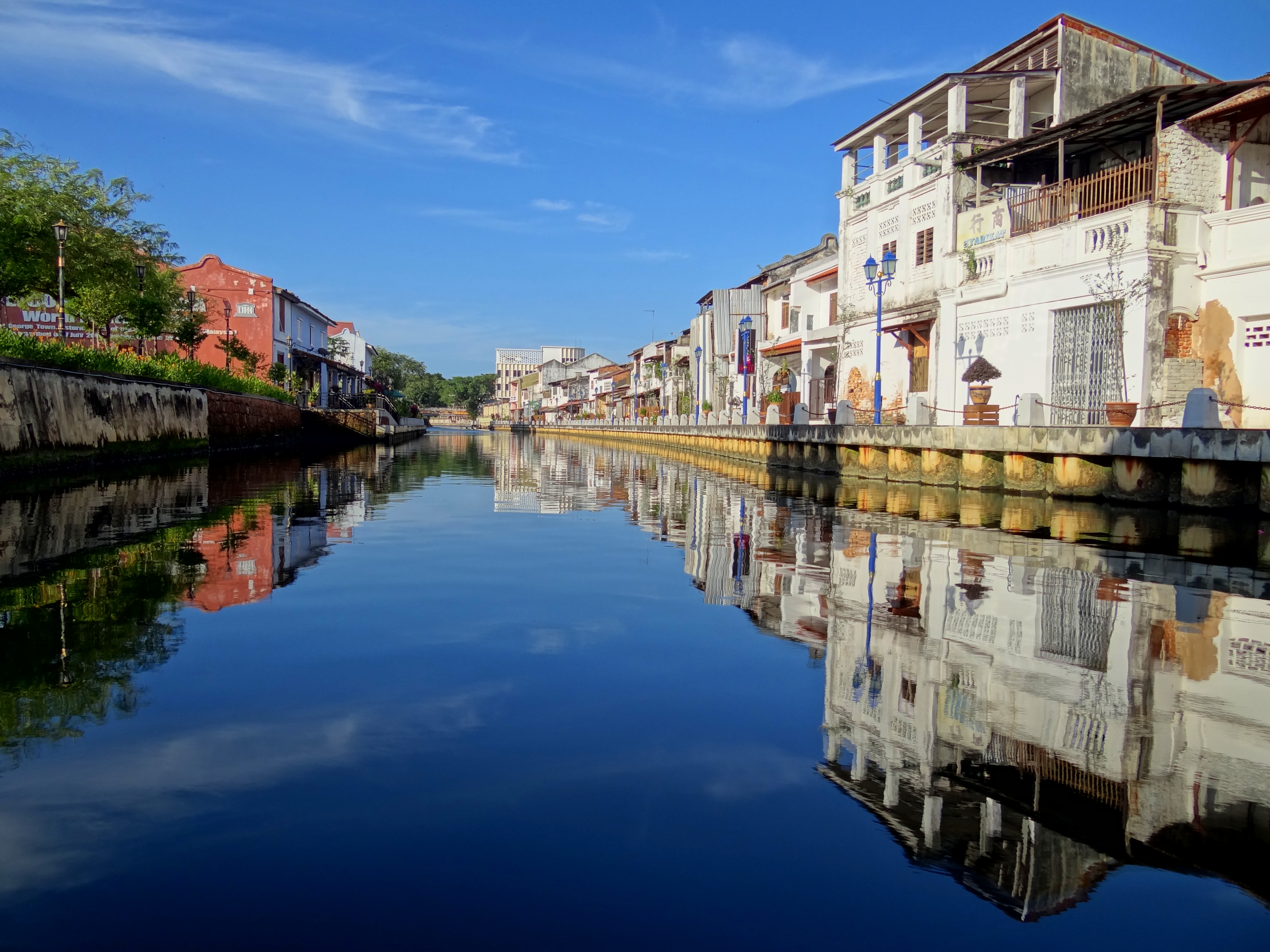
Malacca River

The state of Malacca encompasses 1,746.60 km^{2} (674.37 sq mi) of land area along the southwestern coast of the Malay Peninsula. It borders Negeri Sembilan to the north and west, and Johor across the Kesang River to the east and south. The coastal exclave of Tanjung Tuan is bordered terrestrially by Negeri Sembilan.

=== Topography and hydrology ===
Topographically, 98% of Malacca's land area lies below 150 metres in elevation, and 95.8% of slopes are Class 1 (<15°), presenting a generally low-lying and flat terrain. The highest point in the state is Bukit Gapis (512 metres) on the Asahan ridge.

Drainage is divided across three main river basins: the Malacca River Basin (covering 63.07% of the state's catchment area), the Kesang and Sepang River basins (23.74%), and the northern Langat River basin (13.19%). The coastline extends for 104 kilometres and includes 17 offshore islands, the largest being Besar Island (Pulau Besar), alongside Pulau Undan, Pulau Nangka, and Pulau Dodol. Coastal erosion affects approximately 53.9% of the shoreline, and low-lying coastal corridors face risks associated with tidal inundation and sea-level rise.

=== Climate ===
Malacca experiences a tropical rainforest climate (Köppen: Af), characterised by uniform temperatures, high humidity, and year-round rainfall.

Climate data for Malacca (1991–2020 normals)
Month	Jan	Feb	Mar	Apr	May	Jun	Jul	Aug	Sep	Oct	Nov	Dec	Year
Record high °C (°F)	35.2 (95.4)	37.8 (100.0)	37.2 (99.0)	37.3 (99.1)	38.0 (100.4)	34.7 (94.5)	35.7 (96.3)	34.2 (93.6)	34.6 (94.3)	35.6 (96.1)	34.4 (93.9)	34.6 (94.3)	38.0 (100.4)
Mean daily maximum °C (°F)	31.8 (89.2)	32.9 (91.2)	33.2 (91.8)	33.0 (91.4)	32.6 (90.7)	32.1 (89.8)	31.6 (88.9)	31.6 (88.9)	31.8 (89.2)	32.1 (89.8)	31.7 (89.1)	31.3 (88.3)	32.1 (89.8)
Daily mean °C (°F)	26.9 (80.4)	27.5 (81.5)	27.8 (82.0)	28.0 (82.4)	28.2 (82.8)	27.9 (82.2)	27.5 (81.5)	27.4 (81.3)	27.4 (81.3)	27.4 (81.3)	26.9 (80.4)	26.7 (80.1)	27.5 (81.5)
Mean daily minimum °C (°F)	23.7 (74.7)	23.9 (75.0)	24.3 (75.7)	24.5 (76.1)	24.6 (76.3)	24.4 (75.9)	23.9 (75.0)	23.9 (75.0)	23.9 (75.0)	24.0 (75.2)	23.9 (75.0)	23.8 (74.8)	24.1 (75.4)
Record low °C (°F)	21.7 (71.1)	22.0 (71.6)	22.2 (72.0)	22.6 (72.7)	22.4 (72.3)	22.1 (71.8)	21.8 (71.2)	21.8 (71.2)	21.9 (71.4)	22.1 (71.8)	22.3 (72.1)	21.9 (71.4)	21.7 (71.1)
Average precipitation mm (inches)	102.1 (4.02)	79.7 (3.14)	129.1 (5.08)	166.1 (6.54)	167.3 (6.59)	172.6 (6.80)	196.0 (7.72)	219.5 (8.64)	161.7 (6.37)	189.4 (7.46)	233.1 (9.18)	177.1 (6.97)	1,993.8 (78.50)
Average precipitation days (≥ 1.0 mm)	8.0	6.5	10.1	11.9	10.6	9.4	11.7	12.4	11.4	12.1	15.7	12.5	132.3
Mean monthly sunshine hours	193.0	202.5	214.8	207.5	210.5	193.9	201.3	191.2	171.5	179.6	156.9	166.8	2,289.5
Source 1: World Meteorological Organization
Source 2: NOAA

== Governance and politics ==
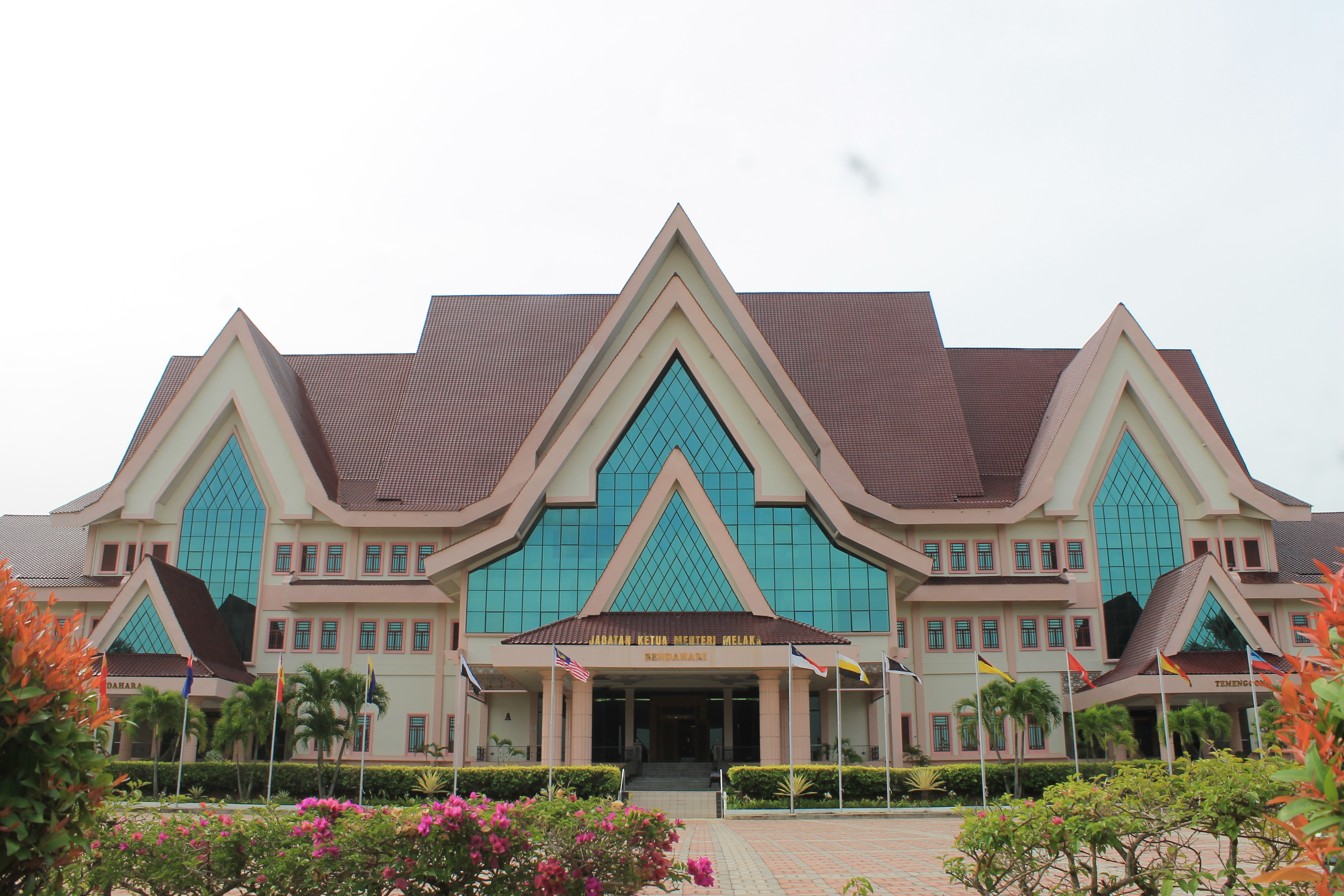
Seri Negeri complex, housing the state administration and the Malacca State Legislative Assembly

The head of state is the governor (Yang di-Pertua Negeri), appointed by the Yang di-Pertuan Agong for a four-year renewable term. Mohd Ali Rustam has served as Governor since June 2020. The head of government is the Chief Minister, who presides over the Malacca State Executive Council. Ab Rauf Yusoh of Barisan Nasional (BN) has served as Chief Minister since March 2023.

The unicameral 28-seat Malacca State Legislative Assembly convenes at the Seri Negeri complex in Ayer Keroh. The state is represented in the federal Dewan Rakyat by six members of Parliament across the constituencies of Masjid Tanah, Alor Gajah, Tangga Batu, Hang Tuah Jaya, Kota Melaka, and Jasin.

=== Administrative divisions ===
Malacca is divided into three administrative districts and 80 mukims and administered locally by four local authorities.

UPI Code	District	Seat	Area (km^{2})	Mukims	Population (2020)
0401	Melaka Tengah	Malacca City	361.80	29	597,135
0402	Jasin	Jasin	689.20	20	151,937
0403	Alor Gajah	Alor Gajah	695.60	31	249,356
04	Total	Malacca City	1,746.60	80	998,428

Map of Malacca showing districts and major settlements

==== List of local authorities ====
- Malacca City Council
- Hang Tuah Jaya Municipal Council
- Alor Gajah Municipal Council
- Jasin Municipal Council

== Economy ==
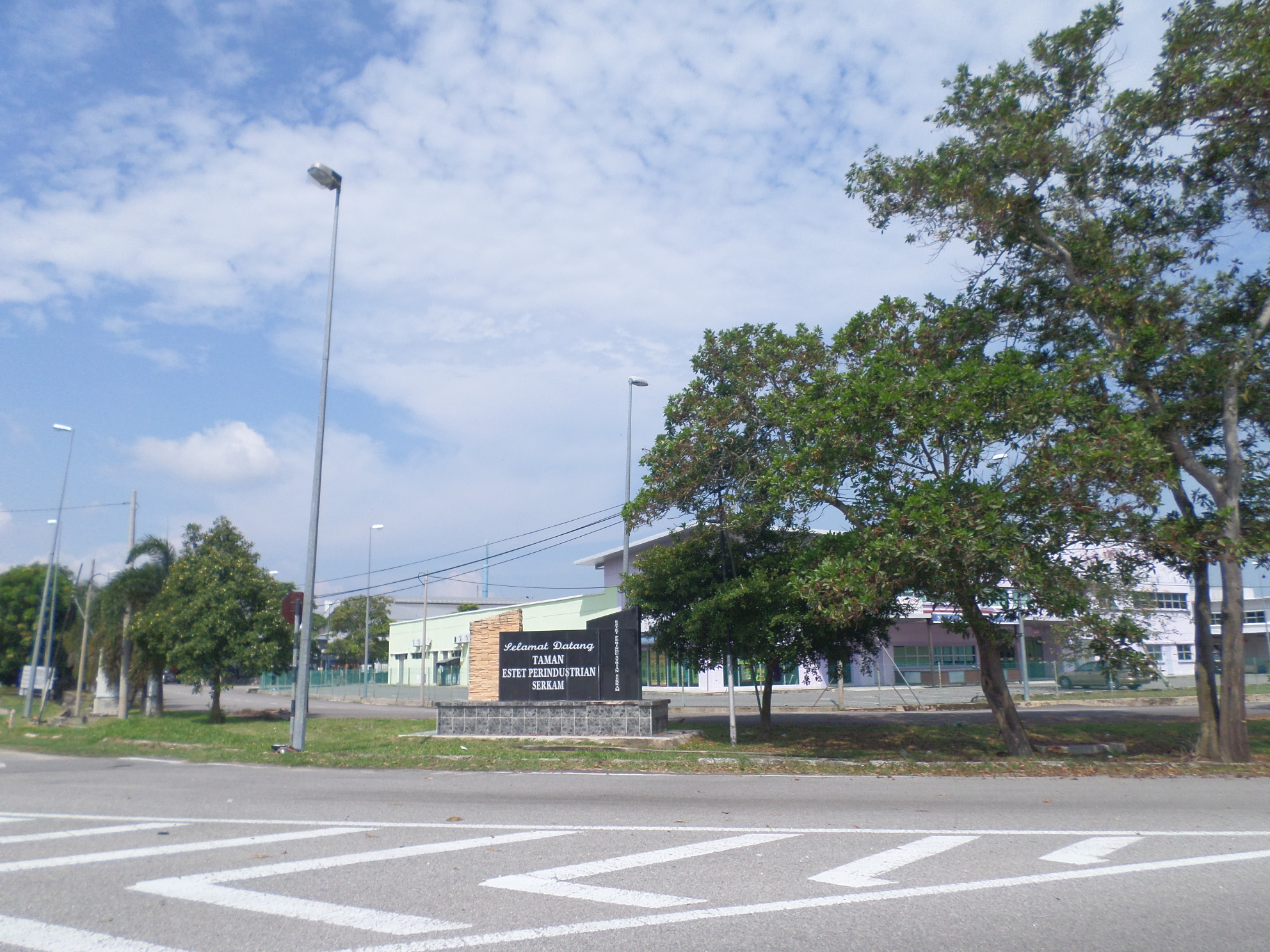
Serkam industrial area

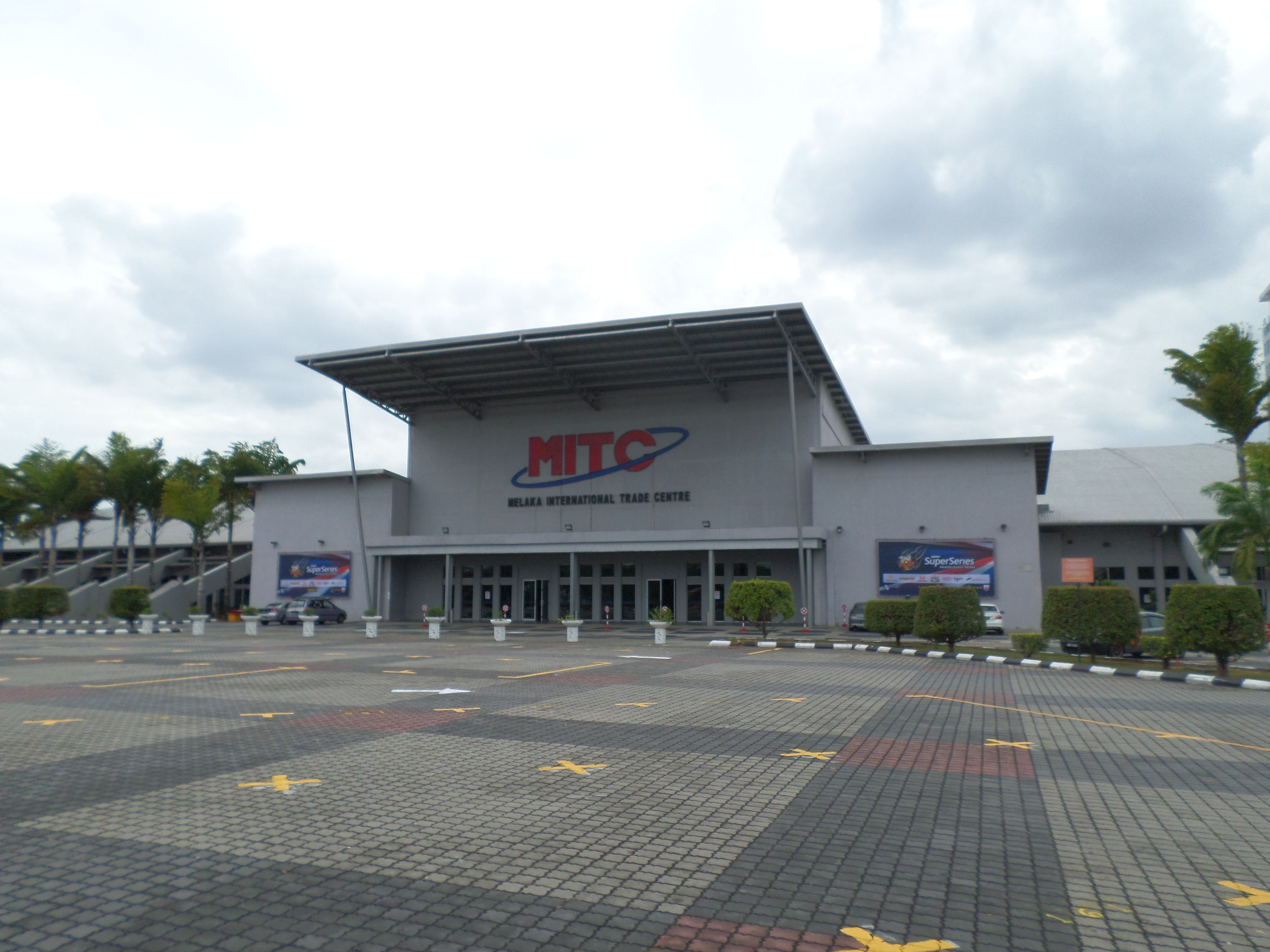
Melaka International Trade Centre

Services and manufacturing are the twin drivers of the state economy, collectively accounting for more than 88% of Malacca's GDP. The services sector accounts for roughly 49% of GDP, driven by tourism, logistics, and retail, followed by manufacturing at approximately 43%. Agriculture, construction, and mining comprise the remaining output.

=== Industrial and trade hubs ===
Industrial activity is organized into dedicated development parks and economic zones:

- Straits of Melaka Waterfront Economic Zone (SM-WEZ 2.0): A 33-kilometre coastal development corridor coordinating marine industrial parks, deepwater terminals, logistics centers, and commercial reclamation zones.
- MCORP Hi-Tech Park and German Technology Park (GTP): Located in Alor Gajah, specializing in advanced automotive assembly, semiconductor manufacturing, and green industrial technologies.
- Elkay Industrial Park: Located in Lipat Kajang, Jasin, housing chemical and advanced materials manufacturing.
- PETRONAS Malacca Refinery Complex in Sungai Udang: Consists of two refining trains with an aggregate capacity of 270,000 barrels per day.

=== Ports and maritime facilities ===
- Tanjung Bruas Port in Tanjung Kling: Constructed in the late 1970s and operational since the early 1980s, handling containers, bulk break, and general cargo.
- Port of Kuala Sungai Linggi (Linggi International Floating Transshipment & Trading HUB, LIFT-HUB): Gazetted in 2006, covering 154 km^{2} for offshore ship-to-ship liquid bulk cargo transfers and bunkering.

== Utilities ==
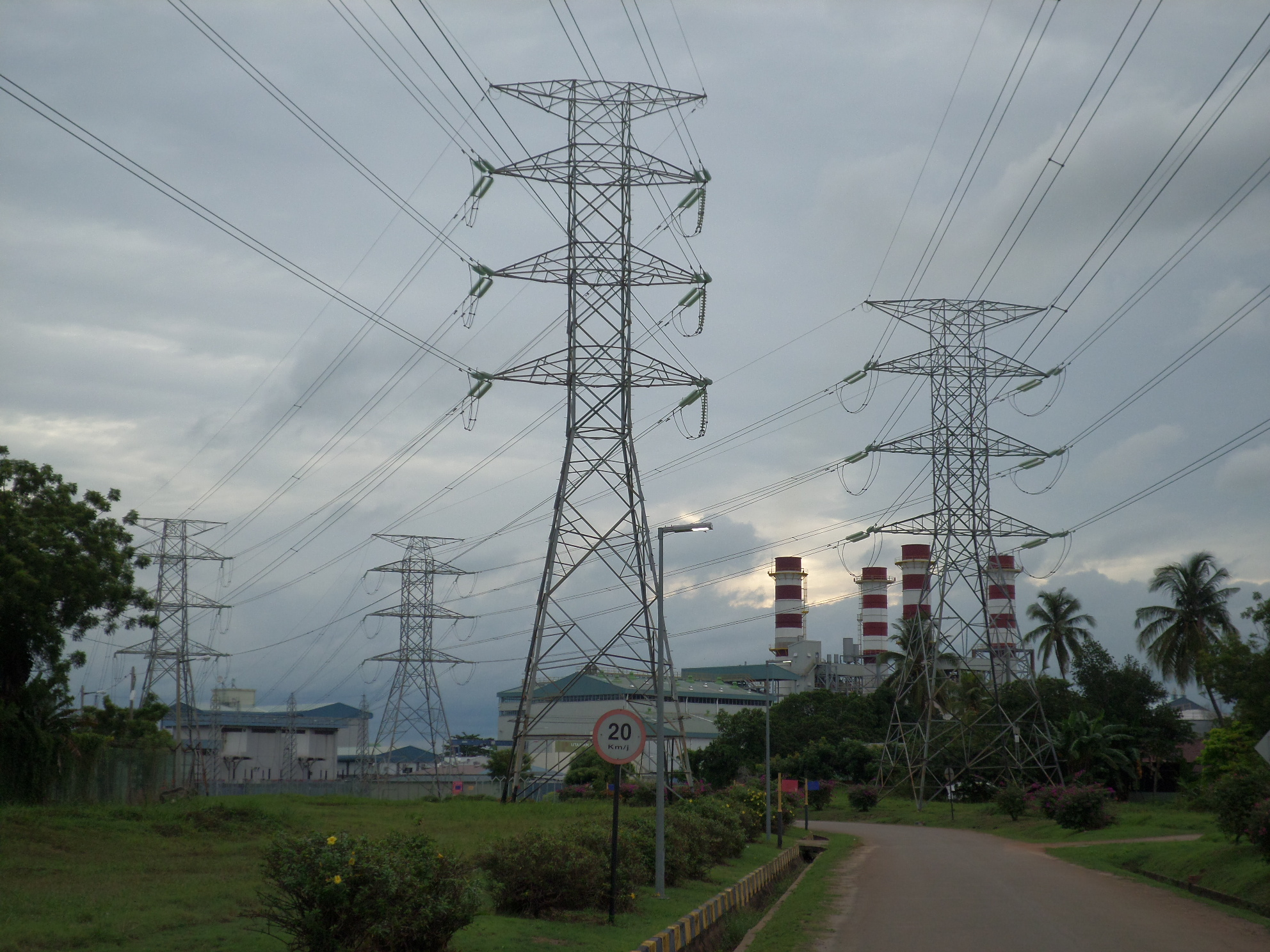
Tanjung Kling Power Station

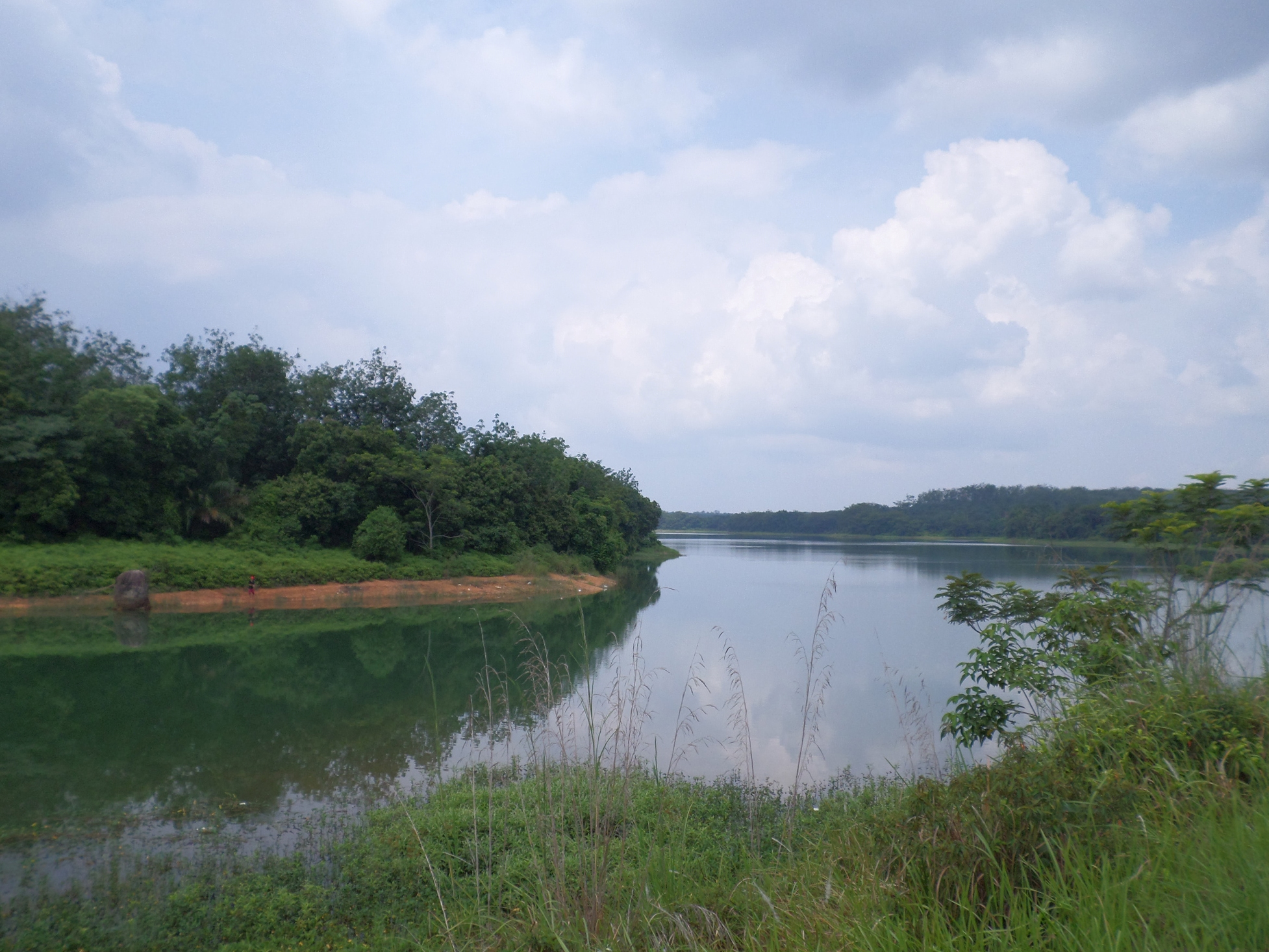
Durian Tunggal Reservoir

=== Energy ===
Malacca houses three major power generation facilities, including the 330 MW Tanjung Kling Power Station and the Telok Gong Power Stations 1 and 2, with combined generating capacities exceeding 1,490 MW. The state also accommodates the Melaka World Solar Valley initiative in Rembia to promote industrial solar installations.

=== Water supply ===
Water services are administered by Syarikat Air Melaka Berhad (SAMB). Malacca is designated as one of Malaysia's five water-stressed states due to its limited catchment footprint and high urban consumption.

Storage is maintained via three dams: Durian Tunggal Reservoir in Alor Gajah, and Jus Reservoir and Asahan Reservoir in Jasin. These are augmented by off-river storage (TAPS Melaka and TAPS Jernih), retention basins, and raw water transfers from the Muar River in Johor.

== Transportation ==
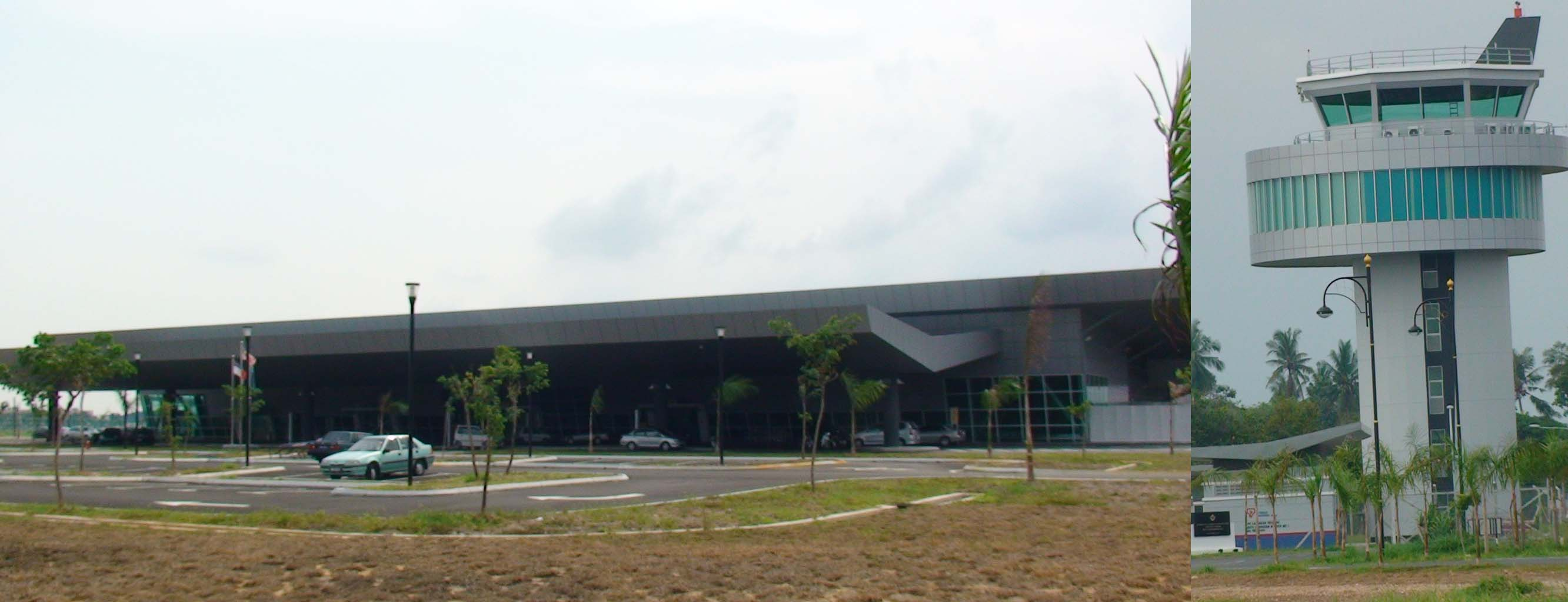
Malacca International Airport

=== Air ===
Malacca International Airport (IATA: MKZ, ICAO: WMKM) in Batu Berendam accommodates regional commercial flights, including services to Singapore. Long-distance international travel is primarily routed via Kuala Lumpur International Airport (KLIA), approximately two hours by road to the north.

=== Railway ===
Railway services operate along the KTM West Coast Line, with passenger halts at Pulau Sebang/Tampin Station and Batang Melaka Station. Pulau Sebang/Tampin is the southern terminus of the KTM Komuter Central Sector and is serviced by regular Electric Train Services (ETS) to Kuala Lumpur and Ipoh.

The Melaka Monorail, a 1.6-km tourist monorail operating along the Malacca River, suspended operations in 2020 due to maintenance and contract challenges.

=== Roads and expressways ===
Intercity road access is provided by the North–South Expressway (PLUS, E2) through exits at Simpang Ampat, Ayer Keroh, and Jasin. The Alor Gajah–Melaka Tengah–Jasin (AMJ) Highway (Federal Route 19) connects the three district centers. Public bus services radiate from the primary interchange at Melaka Sentral to surrounding states and Singapore. Long-term transport plans encompass the southern extension of the West Coast Expressway (WCE) and the proposed Melaka–Dumai Link (MADULink) across the Strait of Malacca.

== Demographics ==
Historical population
Year	Pop.	±%
1970	404,125	—
1980	446,769	+10.6%
1991	506,321	+13.3%
2000	605,239	+19.5%
2010	790,136	+30.5%
2020	998,428	+26.4%

According to the 2020 national census, the population of Malacca stood at 998,428, reaching an estimated 1,027,500 by 2023. Among Malaysian citizens enumerated in 2020, Bumiputera (predominantly Malays) comprised 71.7%, Chinese formed 22.1%, Indians and Chitty accounted for 5.6%, and other ethnicities made up 0.6%. Non-citizens accounted for 7.1% of the total resident population.

The Malay community is divided culturally between those adhering to Adat Temenggong in the central and southern areas, and communities in Naning who observe matrilineal Adat Perpatih traditions. Notable heritage communities include the Peranakan Chinese centered along Jonker Walk and Heeren Street, the Tamil-descended Chitty community in Kampung Gajah Berang, the Kristang people of the Portuguese Settlement, and indigenous Temuan people.

=== Religions ===
Religion in Malacca – 2020 Census
religion	percent
Islam	68.9%
Buddhism	19.2%
Hinduism	5.3%
No religion	3.5%
Christianity	2.6%
Others	0.5%

According to the 2020 Population and Housing Census, 68.9% of the population adhered to Islam, 19.2% practiced Buddhism, 5.3% practiced Hinduism, 3.5% professed no religious affiliation, 2.6% were Christian, and 0.5% adhered to other faiths or traditional beliefs.

Under Article 160 of the Constitution of Malaysia, all ethnic Malays are defined as Muslims by constitutional law. Buddhism is practiced predominantly by the Chinese community, Hinduism is practiced primarily by Indians and Chitty, while Christianity is observed across Eurasians, Kristang, Chinese, and Indian adherents.

== Education ==
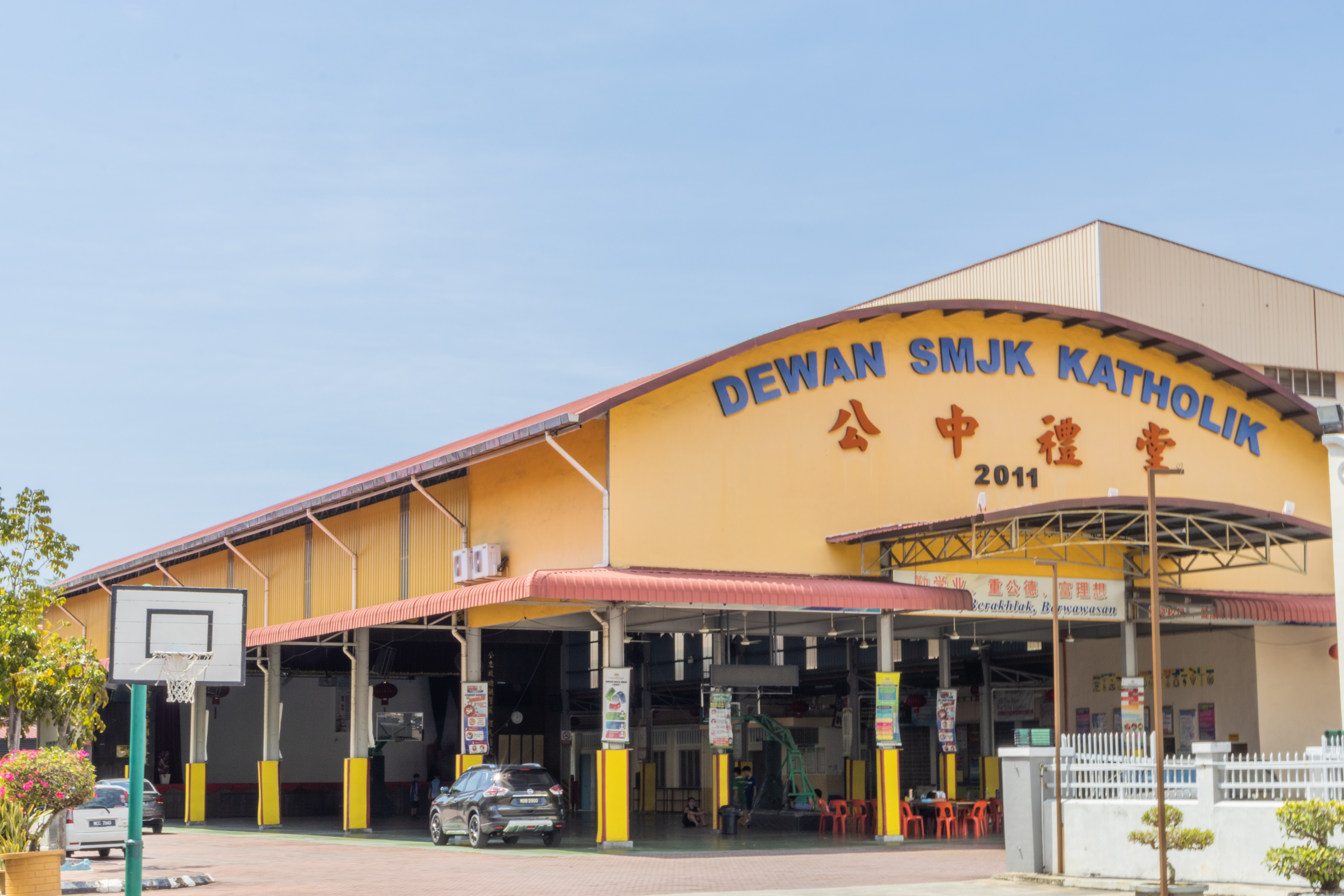
Catholic High School

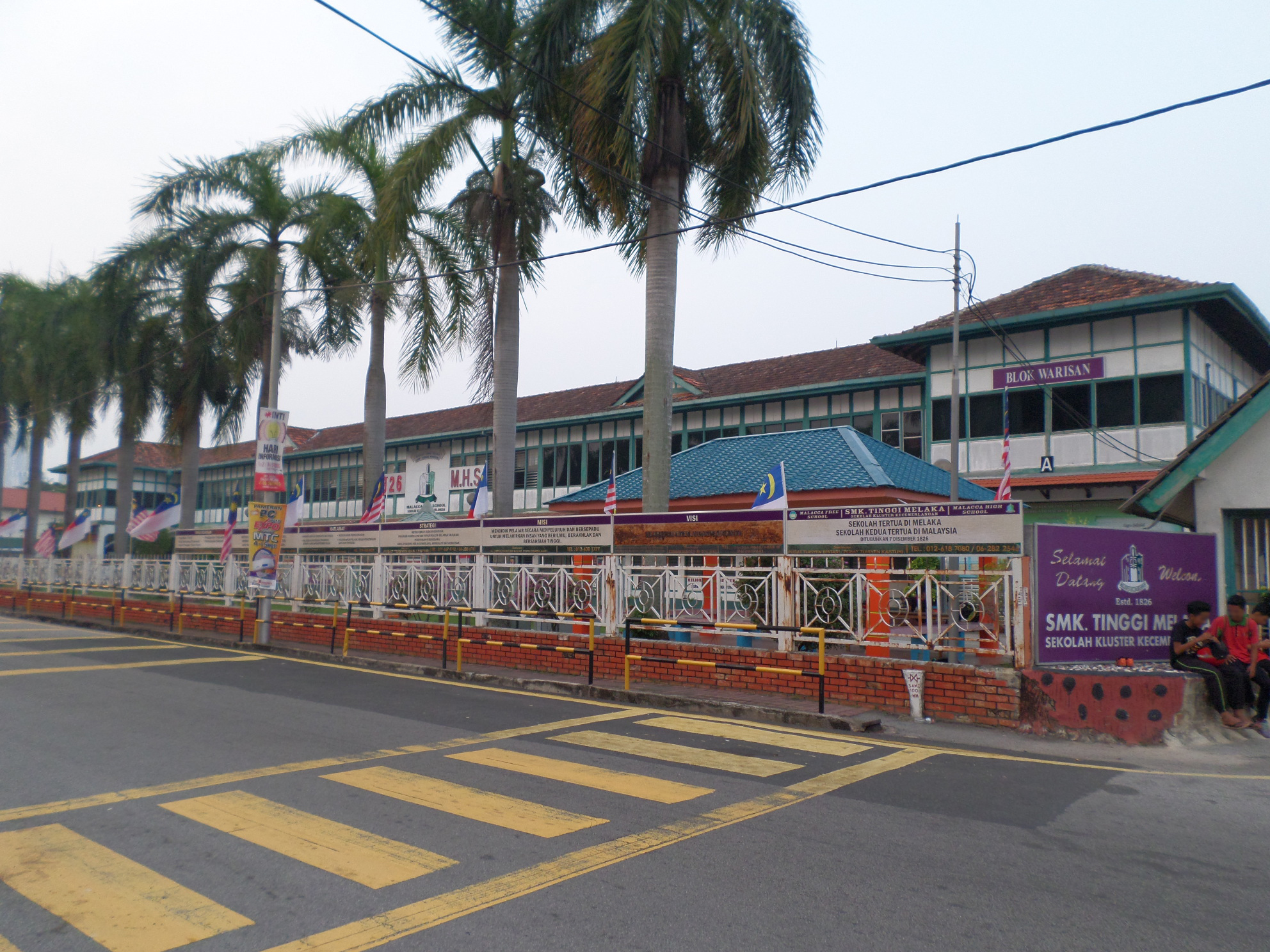
Malacca High School

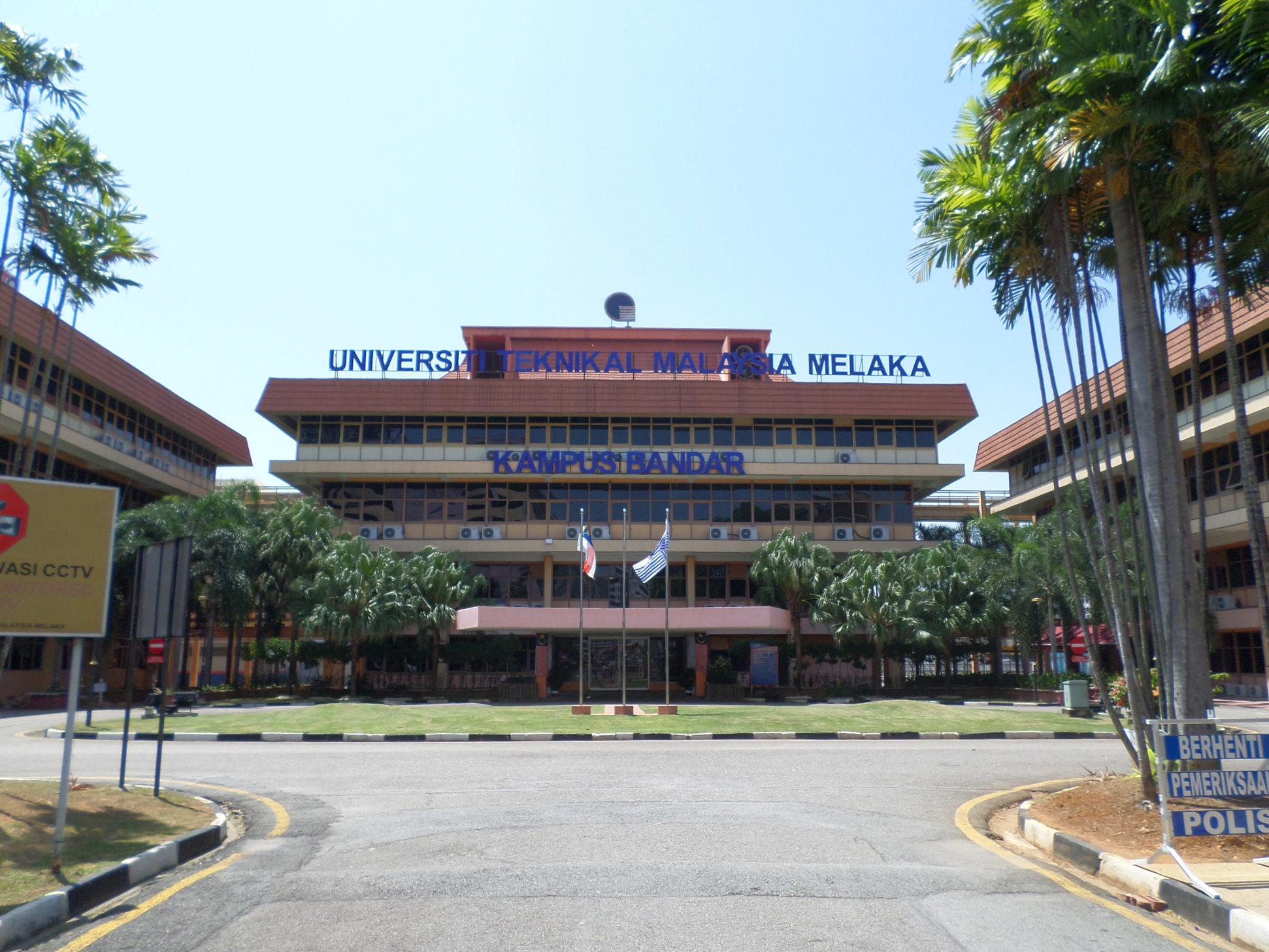
Universiti Teknikal Malaysia Melaka City Campus

As of 2022, Malacca had 238 primary schools and 78 secondary schools. Malacca High School, established in 1826, is the second-oldest secondary school in Malaysia. Tertiary education institutions include:

- Universiti Teknikal Malaysia Melaka (UTeM) in Durian Tunggal and Ayer Keroh.
- Universiti Teknologi MARA (UiTM) with branch campuses in Alor Gajah, Malacca City, and Jasin.
- Multimedia University (MMU) in Bukit Beruang.
- Manipal University College Malaysia (MUCM) in Bukit Baru.
- Malaysian Maritime Academy (ALAM) in Kuala Sungai Baru.

== Healthcare ==
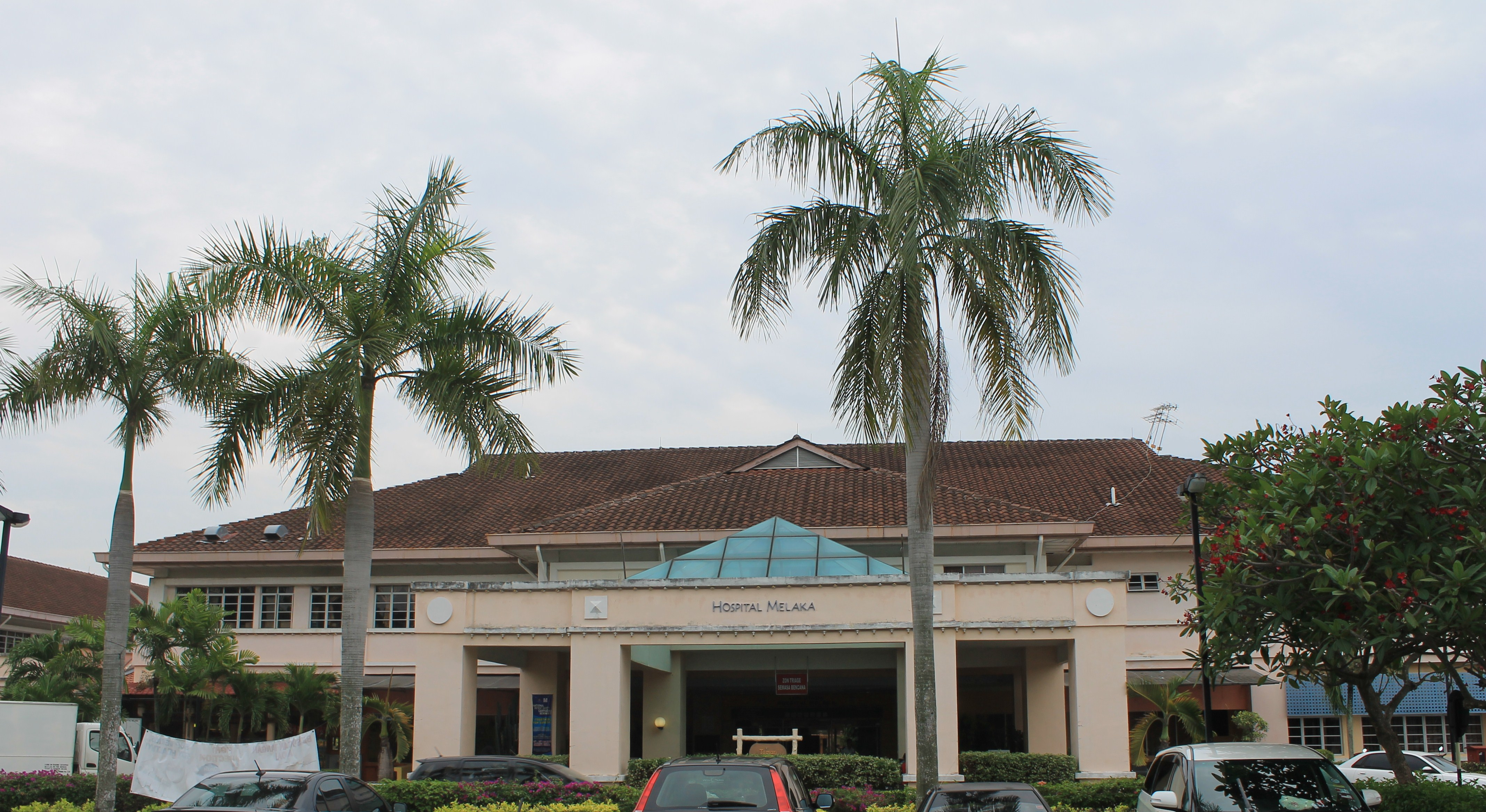
Malacca General Hospital

Malacca houses a number of government and private hospitals and clinics. Medical institutions are located all over Malacca, providing uniform and equitable healthcare to the residents. Health-related affairs in Malacca are governed by Malacca State Health Department by providing basic health service to the residents and oversee all government health facilities in the state among hospitals, community polyclinic, rural health clinics and clinics.

Malacca is also a popular place for health care and medical tourism for Indonesian people from Sumatra due to its close proximity to the state, followed by Singapore. In 2014, Malacca received over 500,000 tourists for medical tourism-related reasons.

Government hospitals in Malacca are the Malacca General Hospital and Jasin District Hospital, while private hospitals are the Putra Hospital, Pantai Hospital Ayer Keroh, Mahkota Medical Centre and Oriental Melaka Straits Medical Centre.

== Culture ==
Malacca is culturally diverse, influenced by a history of ethnic, cultural, and religious intermixing. It is home to ethnic communities such as the Chinese, Indians, and Malays, and those which have emerged from this historical mixing such as the Peranakan Chinese. Buddhist, Hindu, Islamic, Catholic, and Protestant religious buildings are prominent in the city. Portuguese, Dutch, and British rule have left marks on the urban landscape.

=== Arts ===
Dondang Sayang is a traditional Malay art still practised in Malacca by four communities: the Malay, Baba Nyonya, Chitty and Portuguese communities and is recognized by UNESCO. The practice combines elements of music (violins, gongs and tambourines or the tambour), songs and chants, and features melodious strains of poetry. Also known as love ballads, the songs are used by communities to convey feelings of love and give advice on special topics such as love and kindness.

ProjectARM was a street art project brought about by nine artists to create street art along the river in Jalan Kampung Hulu that would highlight Malacca's beauty.

=== Media ===
Malacca is a popular filming location for domestic and international film production companies with the presence of various tourist attractions and historical remains. Iconic Bollywood artist, Shah Rukh Khan described Malacca as beautiful and said he would return for acting and holiday in the state. The films and the music videos published in Malacca include:

- 1987 - Tragic Hero, starring Andy Lau. Part of this Hong Kong movie was filmed in Malacca.
- 1999 - Entrapment, starring Sean Connery, Catherine Zeta-Jones and Kee Thuan Chye, Malaysian actor. Part of the Hollywood movie was shot at Malacca River.
- 2001 - One 2 Ka 4, starring Shah Rukh Khan, Juhi Chawla and Jackie Shroff.
- 2008 - Singaporean drama series The Little Nyonya, starring Jeanette Aw and Qi Yuwu.
- 2011 - Don 2, starring Shah Rukh Khan and Priyanka Chopra. Malacca Prison were among the filming set of the Bollywood movie.
- 2013 - Suami Aku Ustaz, starring Ady Putra, Nora Danish and Izzue Islam. The filming is fully carried out at several locations in Malacca.
- 2016 - Kabali, starring Rajinikanth. Malacca Contingent Police Headquarters and Sungai Udang Prison were filming sites for Kollywood.
- 2016 - Ayda Jebat's Pencuri Hati music video (dangdut version).
- 2017 - Malaysian drama series Hikayat Cinta Si Pematah Hati, starring Alif Satar.
- 2018 - Malaysian telemovie Aku Nazmi starring Jay Iswazir, Ayda Jebat and Sheila Rusly
- 2018 - Malaysian drama series Mr. Grey, starring Fendi Bakry.
- 2021 - Mechamato is a Malaysian animation series which set in a fictional city inspired from Malacca City.

=== Cuisine ===
Malacca received recognition from the World Street Food Congress for Nyonya Siamese Noodles (34th) and Coolie Street Satay (43rd). The various street dishes and delicacies of Malacca include satay celup; chicken rice balls; duck noodles; Malacca-style wonton noodles; nyonya laksa; pai tee (also known as pie tee and top hats); ayam pongteh; asam pedas with fish; Portuguese grilled fish and seafood; fishball lobak; coconut shake; nyonya cendol; putu piring; and nyonya kuih.

=== Sports ===
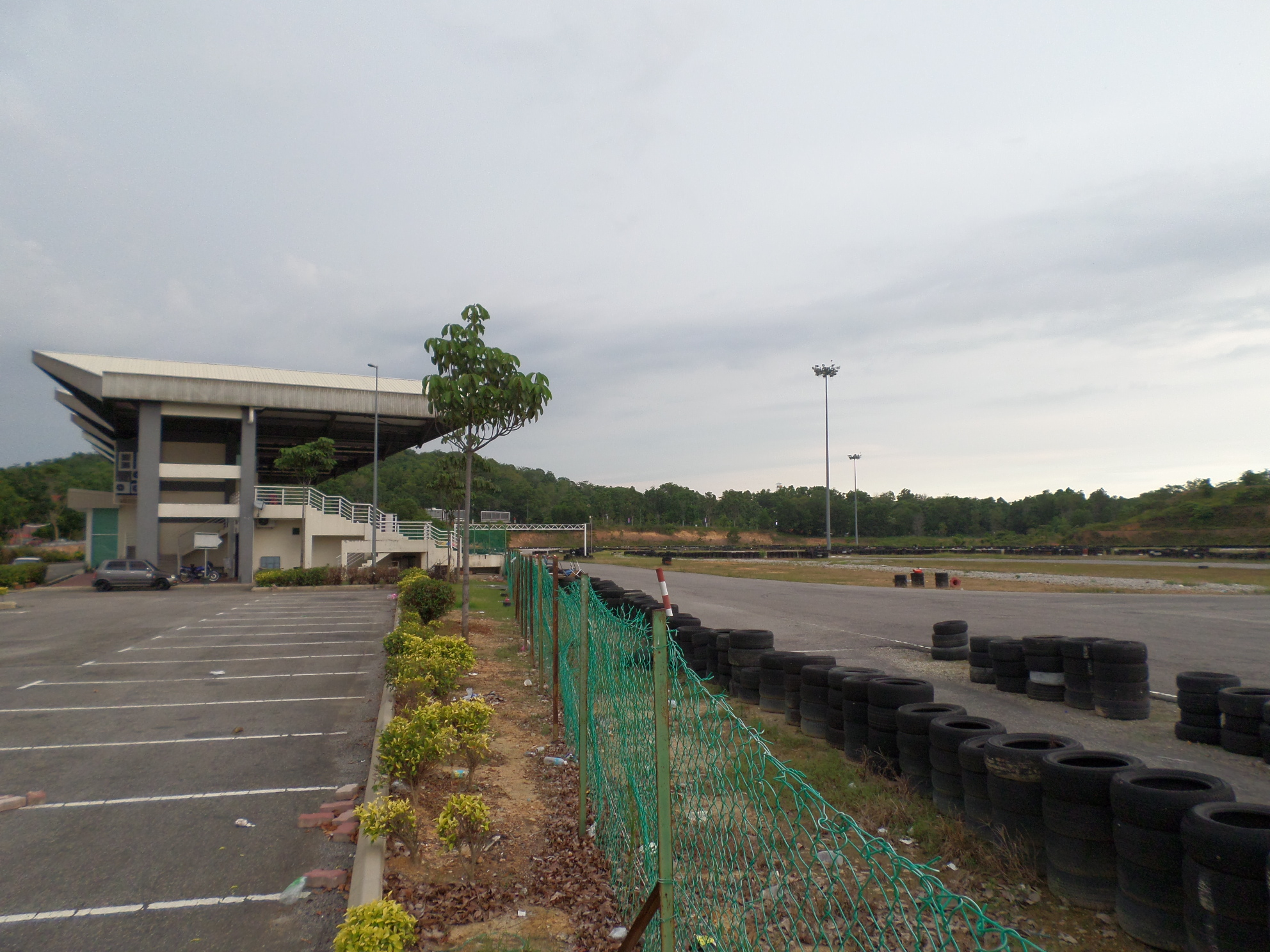
Melaka International Motorsport Circuit

Sports-related affairs of Malacca are governed by the Malacca State Sports Council (Malay: Majlis Sukan Negeri Melaka) under the Malacca State Government. Another governing body of sports in Malacca is the Department of Youth and Sports (Malay: Jabatan Belia dan Sukan Negeri Melaka). Malacca is home to several football stadiums, such as Hang Jebat Stadium (the state's main stadium), Hang Tuah Stadium and Tun Fatimah Stadium. Built in 1954, Hang Tuah Stadium is the oldest stadium in Malacca. Established under the Malacca Stadium Corporation Enactment of 2004, the Malacca Stadium Corporation is the entity that manages stadiums in Malacca which started its operation on 16 September 2004.

There is also a motorsport racetrack in Durian Tunggal named the Melaka International Motorsport Circuit. Melaka International Bowling Centre in Ayer Keroh with 52 lanes is the largest bowling centre in Malaysia.

There are four golf courses in Malacca, namely Ayer Keroh Golf and Country Club in Ayer Keroh, Orna Golf and Country Club in Bemban and Tiara Melaka Golf and Country Club in Bukit Katil and A'Famosa Golf Resort in Simpang Ampat. Golf-related paraphernalia in Malacca is showcased at the Malacca Golf Gallery.

Malacca was the host venue for the 2010 Sukma Games held on 10–19 June 2010.

Malacca also has a football team known as Melaka United representing Malacca in the Malaysian football league. The Melaka United football team won the first Malaysia Premier League title in 1983, in addition they were the champion of the third division of the Malaysia football league, FAM League Cup, in 2015 before won the second Premier League title a year after it. Melaka United uses the Hang Jebat Stadium in Krubong as their home ground with a capacity of 40,000 spectators.

== Notable people ==
- Soh Chin Ann (born 1950), Malaysian former footballer.
- Andre Filipe Desker (1826–1898), butcher and philanthropist
- Khairul Hafiz Jantan (born 1998), Malaysian sprinter.
- Tan Cheng Lock (1883–1960), businessman, politician and 1st president of the Malayan Chinese Association.
- Devan Nair (1923–2005), third President of Singapore
- A. Samad Said (born 1935), novelist and poet.
- Tan Siew Sin (1916–1988), Minister of finance and 3rd president of the Malaysian Chinese Association, son of Tan Cheng Lock.
- Goh Keng Swee (1918–2009), second Deputy Prime Minister of Singapore.
- Ronnie Theseira (1930–2022), Malaysian Olympic fencer
- Ziana Zain (born 1968), singer and actress.

== See also ==
- Malacca Sultanate
- Straits Settlements
- Dutch Malacca
