= Satay =

Southeast Asian form of kebab

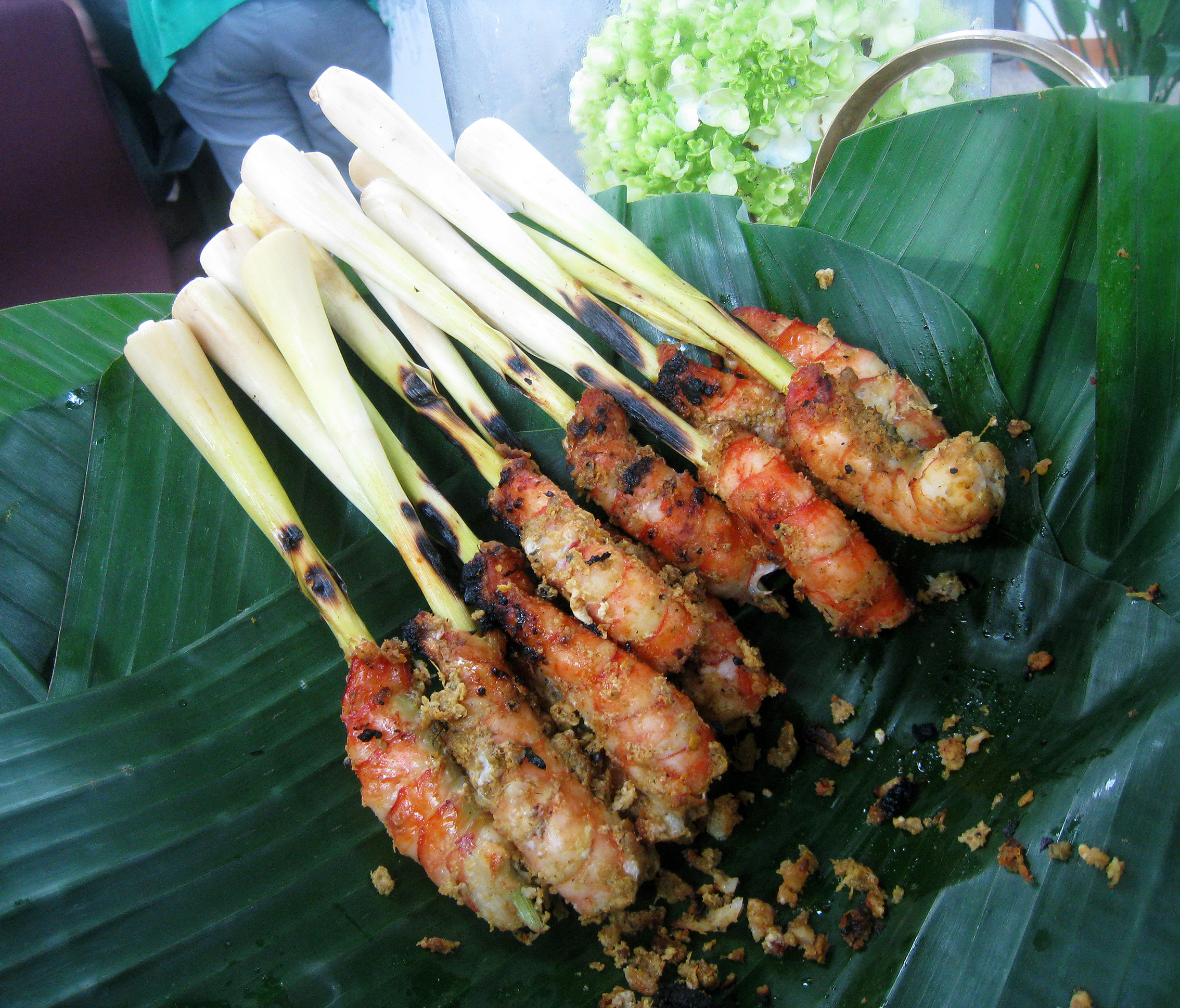
- Sate Udang or shrimp satay with lemongrass stick handle
- Alternative names: Sate, Satai, Satti
- Course: Entrée, main course or side-dish
- Place of origin: Maritime Southeast Asia
- Associated cuisine: Indonesia, Malaysia, Filipino, Singapore, Brunei and Thailand
- Serving temperature: Hot
- Main ingredients: Skewered and grilled meats with various sauces, mainly peanut sauce
- Variations: Numerous variations across Southeast Asia

Satay (Note: /ˈsɑːteɪ/ SAH-tay or /ˈsæteɪ/ SA-tay, in the US also /sɑːˈteɪ/ sah-TAY or /sæˈteɪ/ sa-TAY) or sate is a Southeast Asian dish consisting of small pieces of seasoned meat, seafood or vegetables skewered on sticks and grilled over charcoal. It is typically served with a sauce, most commonly peanut-based and accompanied by rice cakes, cucumber or pickled vegetables. Common ingredients include chicken, beef, goat, pork and seafood, while regional and vegetarian variations are also found.

The dish evolved through a blend of foreign and local culinary influences. Middle Eastern kebabs introduced by Muslim traders, South Asian cooking techniques brought by Tamil and Gujarati merchants, and Chinese practices such as bamboo skewering and bite-sized portions were adapted in the port cities of Java, Sumatra and the Malay Peninsula. Combined with the use of regional ingredients and spices including lemongrass, turmeric, galangal, and peanuts, these influences gave rise to a distinctly Southeast Asian style of grilled skewered meat.

Satay is widely consumed across Indonesia, Malaysia, Singapore, Brunei, Thailand and the southern Philippines, where it forms part of everyday meals, street food and festive occasions. Regional adaptations reflect local ingredients and cooking traditions, incorporating elements such as sweet soy sauce, coconut milk, turmeric and spice pastes, often served with ketupat, lontong or pickled condiments. The dish is prepared by hawkers, restaurants and home cooks alike, and has become a familiar feature of night markets and public celebrations.

Through migration and cultural exchange, satay has gained international recognition, with notable adaptations in the Netherlands, Suriname, South Africa and Sri Lanka. It is regarded as a national dish in Indonesia and Malaysia and remains a prominent element of hawker and street-food culture in Singapore, Thailand and Brunei. The dish is also maintained within overseas communities such as the Indo-Dutch in the Netherlands, the Sri Lankan Malays and the Javanese Surinamese, where it continues to represent a link to their Southeast Asian culinary heritage.

== Etymology ==
According to the Oxford English Dictionary and the Collins English Dictionary, the English word satay derives from the Malay and Indonesian word satai, also taken from saté or sate (ꦱꦠꦺ) in Javanese, and is ultimately traced to the Tamil word catai (சதை), a regional variant of tacai meaning "flesh". A common false etymology is that it derives from the Hokkien phrase saⁿ tè (bah), meaning "three pieces (of meat)", but this etymology is unlikely.

== History ==
=== Inspiration from foreign food traditions ===
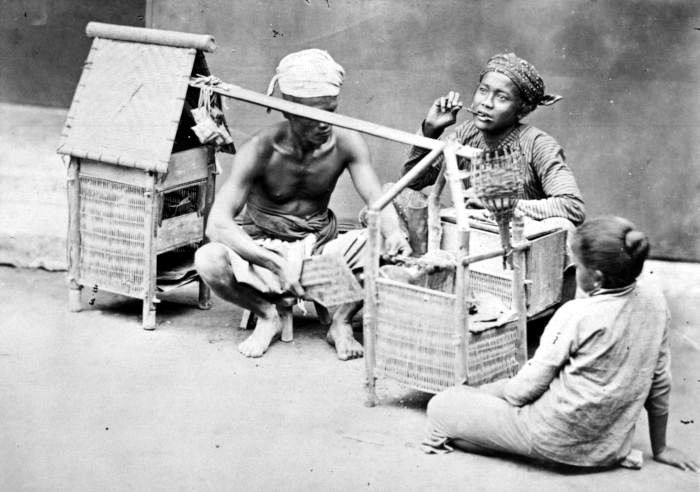
Studio portrait of a satay vendor with his pikulan (shoulder pole) and customers, circa 1870 in Java. Collection of the Tropenmuseum, Netherlands.

The culinary technique underlying satay is widely regarded as the result of multiple streams of foreign influence that reached Maritime Southeast Asia through long-distance trade and migration. The skewered and grilled meat dishes of the Middle East, particularly Turkish and Arab kebabs, spread eastward along established trade routes. Muslim merchants introduced these practices to South Asia, where they were adapted into local culinary traditions. Tamil and Gujarati Muslim traders, who were active in the Indian Ocean trading networks, prepared seasoned and grilled meats that bore similarities to kebabs, and these foodways accompanied them when they established communities in Southeast Asian port cities.

Chinese migrants also contributed to the evolution of the dish. Their culinary techniques emphasised the use of bamboo skewers and the preparation of meat in small, bite-sized portions suited to quick grilling over charcoal fires. These methods complemented South Asian and Middle Eastern influences, resulting in a hybrid style of preparation that was well suited to the demands of street vending and communal dining in the region.

=== Emergence in Maritime Southeast Asia ===
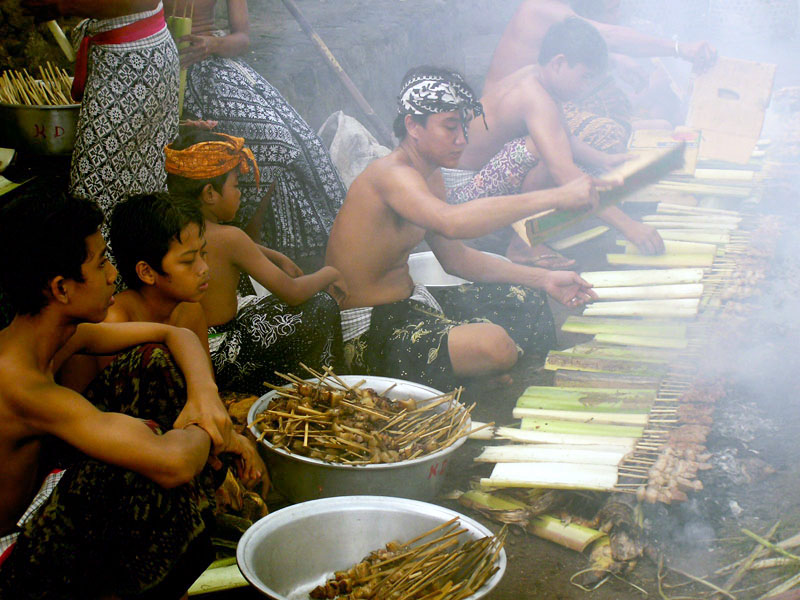
Preparation of satay before the Perang Pandan (Pandan War) festival in Tenganan village, Karangasem, Bali.

By the early modern period, the combined influences of Middle Eastern, South Asian and Chinese food traditions had taken root in the Malay archipelago and surrounding regions. Java, Sumatra and the Malay Peninsula were central nodes of maritime trade, attracting Muslim merchants from Gujarat, Tamil Nadu and the Arabian Peninsula, alongside large communities of Chinese migrants. In these multicultural port towns, local populations were exposed to diverse methods of preparing and seasoning meat.

The introduction of satay, and other now-iconic dishes such as tongseng and gulai kambing based on meats such as goat and lamb, coincided with an influx of Indian and Arab traders and immigrants starting in the 18th century. The Indonesian publication Koran Jakarta claimed that sate, and ultimately satay, originated from Javanese term sak beteng which means one stick, and that the dish had existed as early as the 15th century. Meanwhile, the satay relief is found at the ancient Cabean Kunti bathing site which was built around the 8th to 10th century in Boyolali Regency, Central Java.

It was within this environment that satay began to take on a distinctive Southeast Asian identity. Local cooks adapted foreign grilling practices to available resources, using bamboo skewers and coconut shell charcoal, and incorporating regional spices such as lemongrass, turmeric, coriander and galangal. Peanuts, introduced from the Americas via the Manila galleon trade, provided the basis for the peanut sauce that became one of satay's most recognisable accompaniments.

The dish soon spread beyond port cities into inland regions, where it became embedded in the food cultures of Javanese, Malay and other ethnic groups. By the 19th century, satay was already being recorded by colonial observers as a popular street food and festival dish, reflecting its role as both a culinary innovation of global exchanges and a locally embedded tradition.

=== Regional diversification ===
As satay spread throughout Maritime Southeast Asia, it underwent a process of localisation that reflected the diverse cultural and ecological settings of the region. The basic technique of grilling skewered meat over charcoal was retained, but local communities adapted the dish according to their own culinary traditions, preferred proteins and seasoning styles.

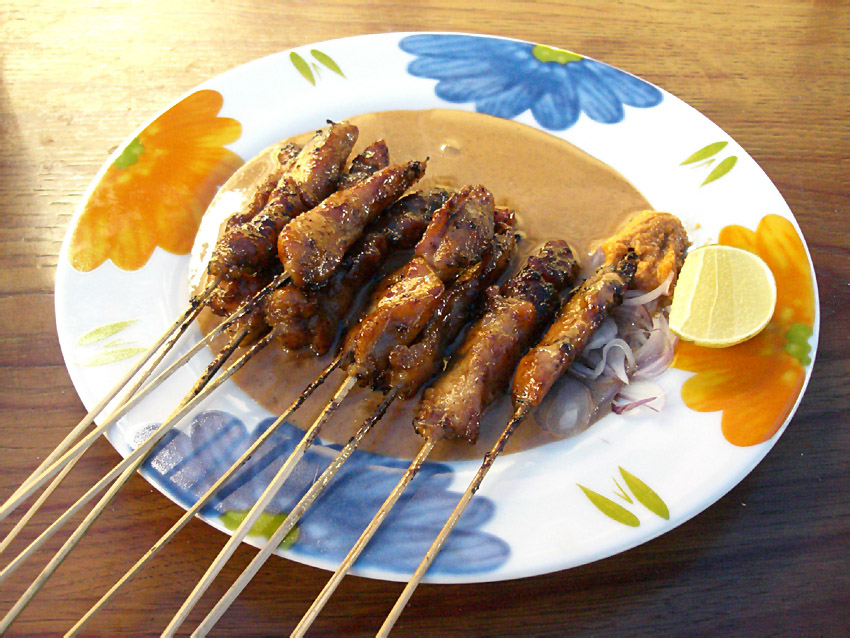
Sate Ponorogo, is believed among Indonesian as earliest satay dish in Java, introduced by the first regent of Ponorogo Regency

In Indonesia, the dish developed into a wide variety of regional forms. In Java, chicken (sate ayam) and goat (sate kambing) became popular, often marinated in sweet soy sauce and served with peanut sauce or sliced shallots, and the two famous ones are sate Madura and sate Ponorogo from East Java. Central Java and Yogyakarta are also known for sate klathak, made from skewered mutton seasoned simply with salt and grilled over open charcoal. In Bali, sate lilit features minced meat mixed with grated coconut and spices, wrapped around bamboo sticks or lemongrass stalks. In Sumatra, Minangkabau cooks developed sate Padang, characterised by its thick, spicy turmeric-based sauce, while Aceh's sate matang offered their own variants satay with broth. Other distinctive Indonesian examples include sate kelinci (rabbit satay) from mountainous regions, sate kerang (cockle satay) from coastal areas and sate buntel (minced lamb wrapped in caul fat) from Surakarta. Satay in Indonesia is also an inseparable part of religious ceremonies, one of them is on Galungan for Hindus in Bali, which dozens of typical satays are served, including sate jepit, sate gunting, sate kuung and so on.

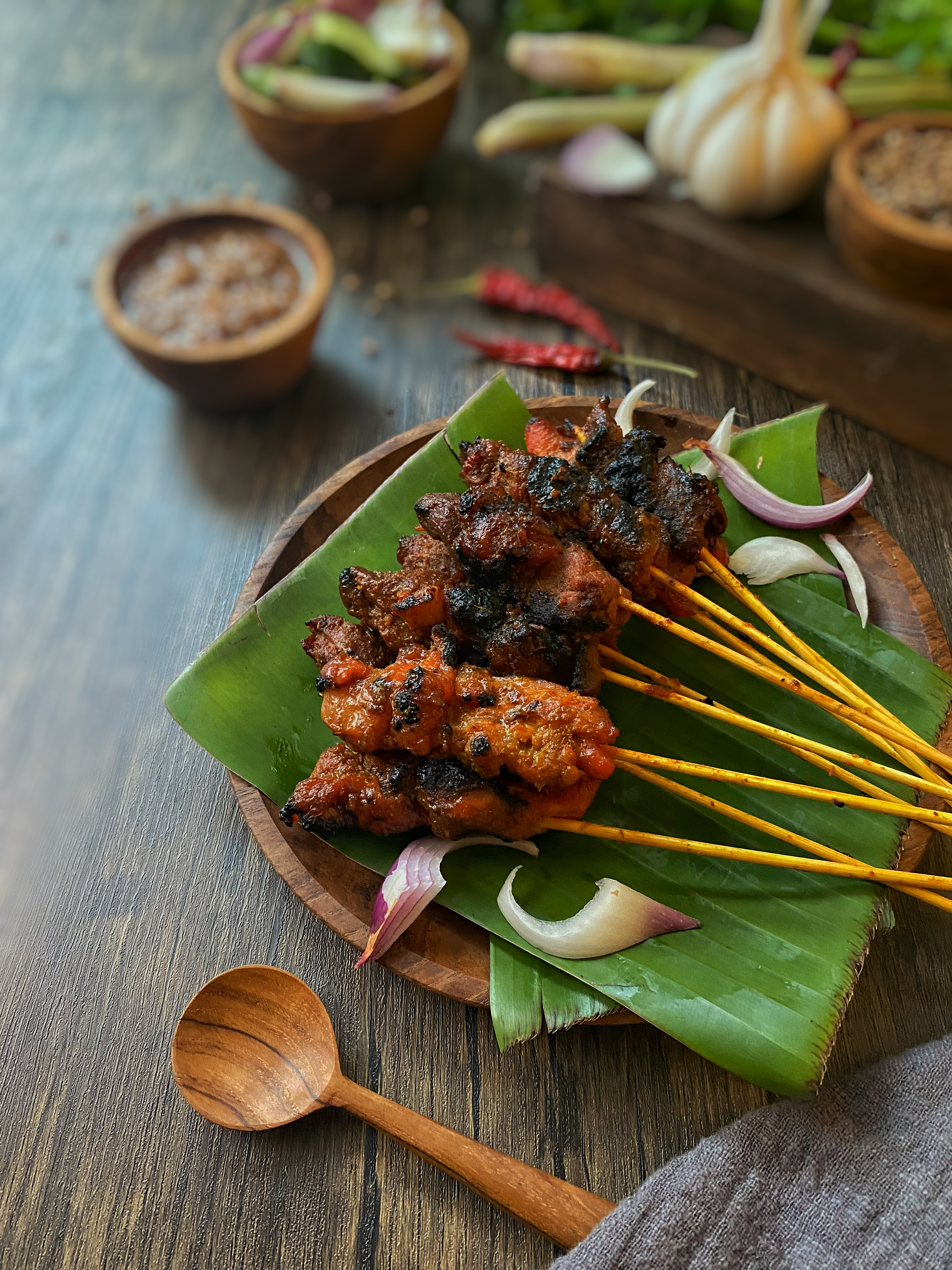
Malaysian chicken satay served with peanut sauce, a popular local variation of the dish.

On the Malay Peninsula, Malay communities embraced satay as part of their food heritage. Common local variations included beef, chicken, and tripe, usually served with a peanut-based sauce, ketupat (compressed rice cakes) and raw onions or cucumber. Other distinctive versions made use of meats such as rabbit, venison and even porcupine. On the east coast, lokching (also known as sate ikan or fish satay) forms an important element of local identity. In Sabah, the arrival of Cocos Malay migrants contributed sate Cocos to the state's culinary repertoire.

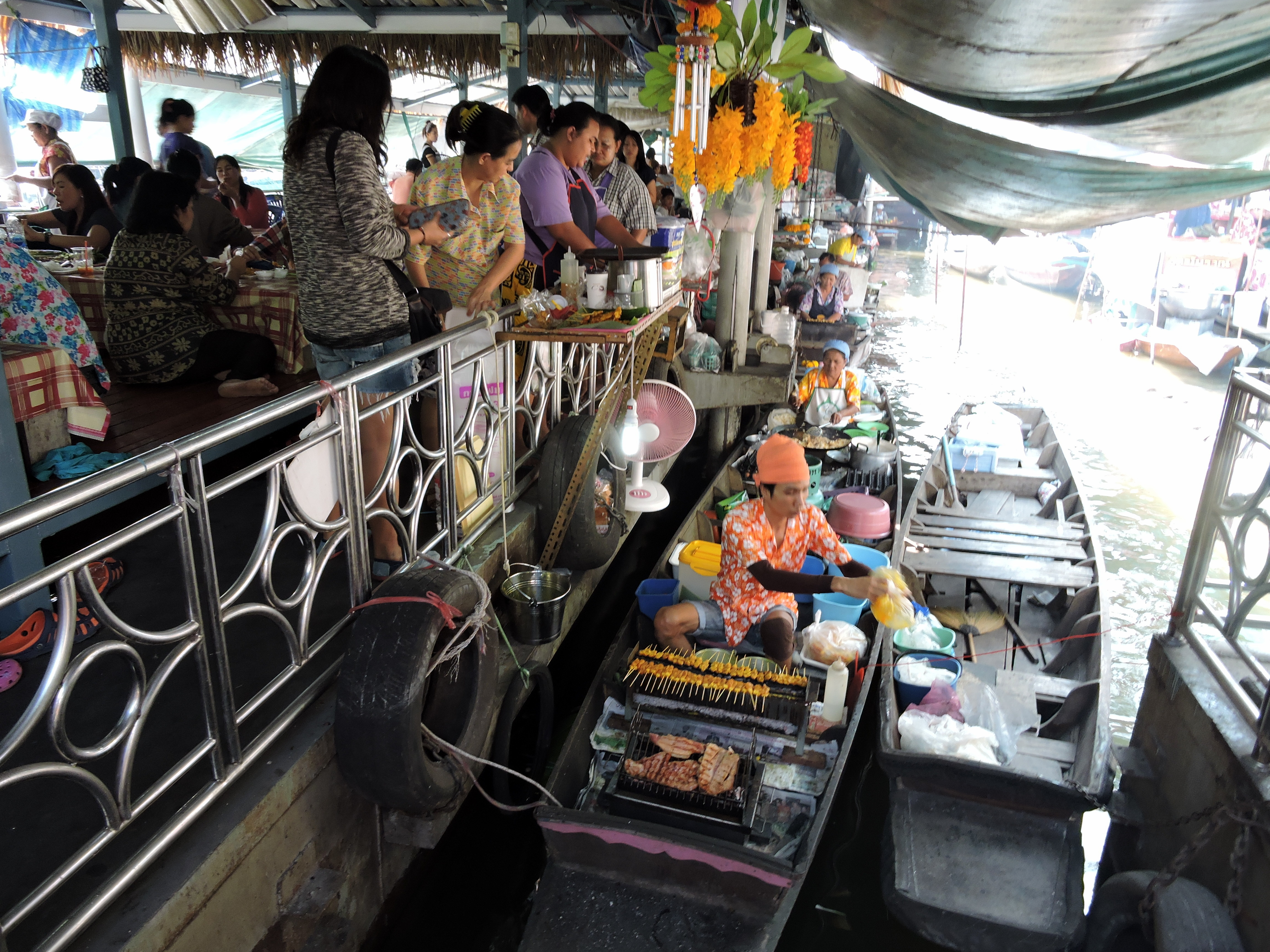
A vendor selling satay from a boat at Khlong Chak Phra, Taling Chan, Bangkok, Thailand

In Thailand, satay is believed to have been introduced through Malay–Muslim communities in the southern provinces, where it continues to be part of local food traditions. The dish subsequently spread northwards, including to Bangkok, where it was adapted with Thai-style marinades and condiments. Some sources suggest that its introduction to central Thailand may also have occurred via Singapore. While chicken and beef are more typical in the Muslim-majority south, pork satay became particularly widespread in mainstream Thai cuisine. It is now a common element of Thai street food, usually served with peanut sauce and pickled cucumber relish.

In Singapore, satay became a hallmark of hawker culture, shaped by Malay, Javanese and Hainanese influences, and was sold at venues such as the historic Satay Club. In the southern Philippines, Muslim Filipino communities developed a related dish known as satti, thought to have been derived from satay and typically served with a spicy sauce and rice cake. Other Filipino skewered meat dishes, such as inasal or barbecue, show parallels with satay through the shared practice of charcoal grilling, though they developed distinctive seasonings shaped by local tastes.

Satay thus became established in multiple food cultures across Southeast Asia, with each region creating its own distinctive versions. Despite differences in choice of meat, marinades and condiments, the dish remained recognisable by its characteristic method of grilling skewered portions of meat over charcoal.

=== Colonial-era dispersal and diaspora ===
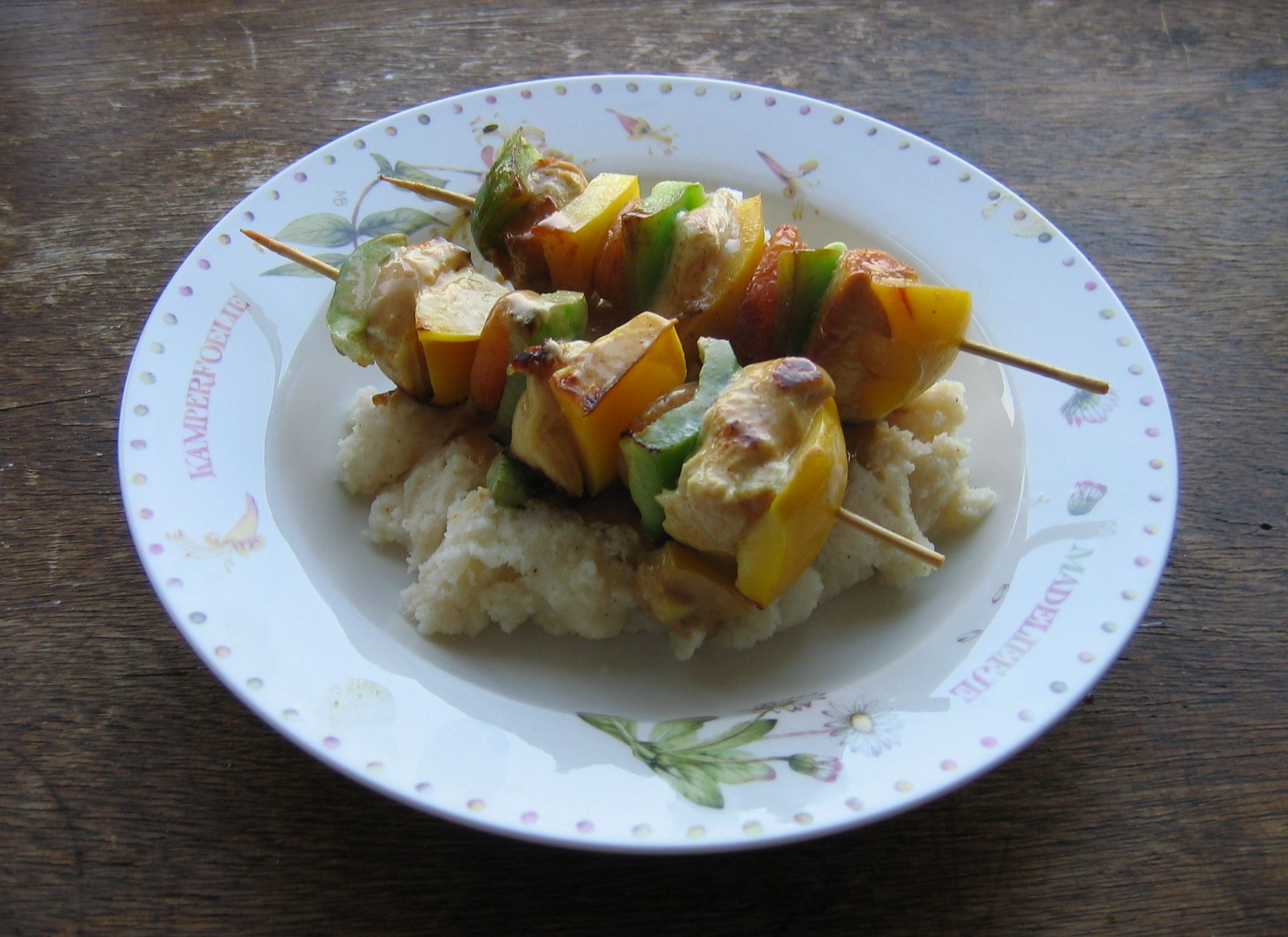
South African sosaties, a Cape Malay dish influenced by satay, made with marinated meat grilled on skewers.

During the colonial era satay travelled beyond Maritime Southeast Asia through several overlapping channels: indentured labour recruitment, penal and military transfers, merchant networks and later migration of colonial-era administrators and their families. The movement was not a single event but a series of flows from the late 18th century through the first half of the 20th century that carried both people and culinary practices to new social and ecological settings.

Javanese labourers introduced satay to Suriname, where it became a hallmark of Javanese-Surinamese cuisine and later integrated into the broader national food culture. In the Netherlands, returning colonial officials, Indo-Dutch families and post-war migrants brought the dish into domestic cooking and restaurant traditions, where sate became a central feature of the rijsttafel and remains a popular staple of Dutch cuisine.

In South Africa, Malay settlers at the Cape developed sosatie, a marinated and skewered meat dish influenced by satay, which became a distinctive part of Cape Malay and broader South African cooking. In Sri Lanka, Malay communities who arrived through colonial-era military and administrative transfers preserved the dish within their own culinary traditions, where it is known as satay and served at communal and festive occasions.

=== Modern globalisation ===
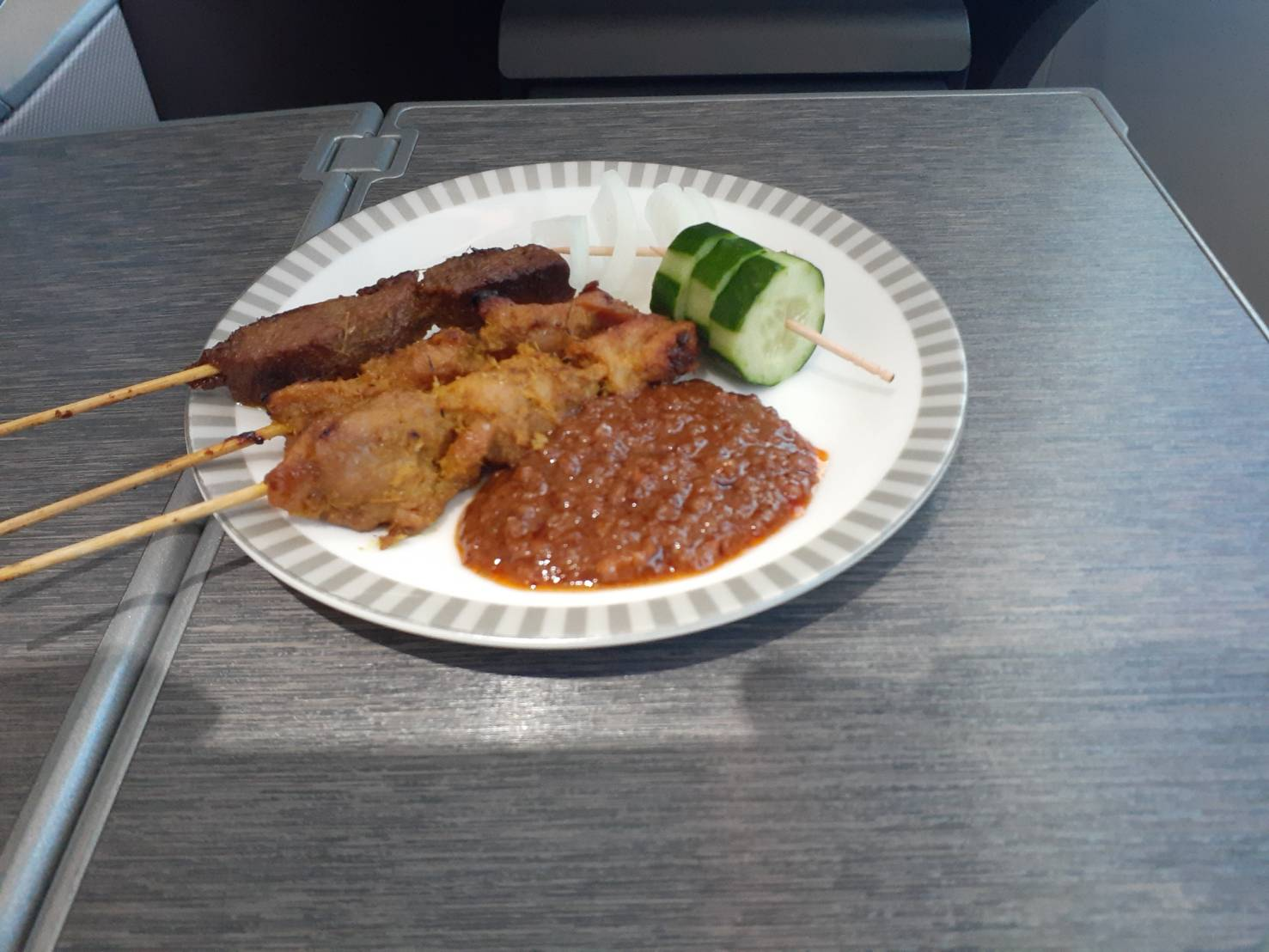
Satay served as an appetiser on Singapore Airlines

During the colonial era, satay was documented by Dutch and British observers as a popular food across the Indonesian archipelago and the Malay Peninsula. By the 19th century, street vendors in Java, Malay Peninsula, Singapore and Siam were noted for selling skewered meats grilled over portable charcoal braziers. In British Malaya, satay was commonly associated with Malay night markets, festive occasions, and roadside stalls, while in the Dutch East Indies it was reported as a widespread urban street food.

In the decades that followed, satay became embedded in the culinary life of multi-ethnic port cities. In Singapore, it was widely sold by hawkers and became a popular evening street food, later concentrated in venues such as the Satay Club. In Malaysia, towns such as Kajang emerged as centres of satay production and consumption, while in Indonesia the dish remained closely tied to local markets and festive gatherings.

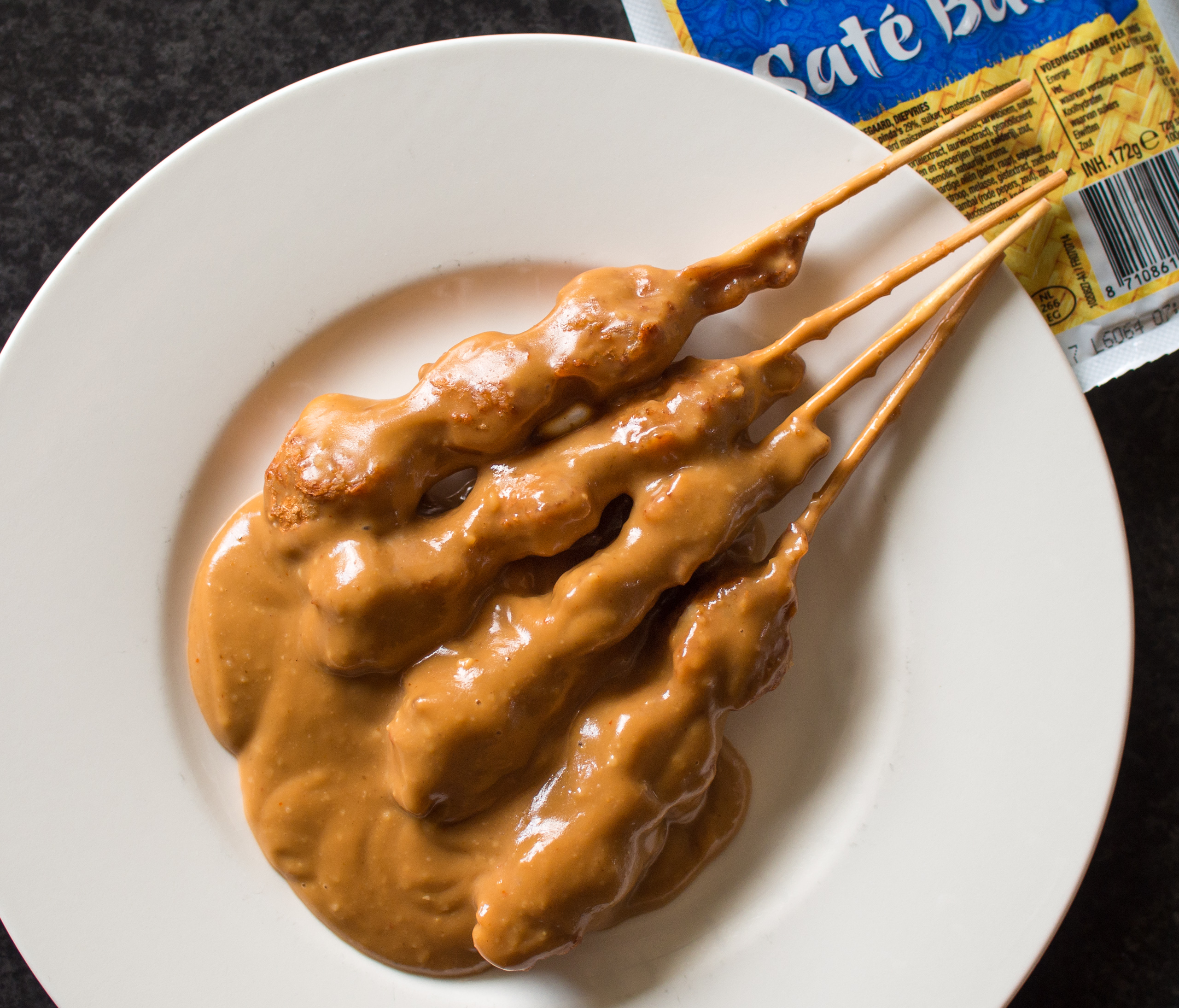
Factory-produced satay babi (pork satay) in the Netherlands

From the mid-20th century onwards, satay gained wider recognition as migration and diaspora communities introduced it abroad. Indonesian, Malaysian, Singaporean and Thai emigrants established restaurants across Asia, Europe, Australia and North America, while adaptations in the Philippines reflected parallel culinary exchanges. International food festivals, cookbooks and diplomatic events further promoted satay as a signature Southeast Asian dish.

Today, satay is regarded as a national dish in both Indonesia and Malaysia, while in Singapore it is closely tied to hawker culture. In 2011, it was listed by the Ministry of Tourism and Creative Economy of Indonesia as one of the country's national foods; in Malaysia, it is likewise recognised as a national heritage food by the Department of National Heritage; and in 2020, it was included in Singapore's UNESCO inscription of hawker culture on the Representative List of the Intangible Cultural Heritage of Humanity. These recognitions reflect satay's dual role as a shared regional tradition and a marker of national heritage across Southeast Asia.

== Preparation ==
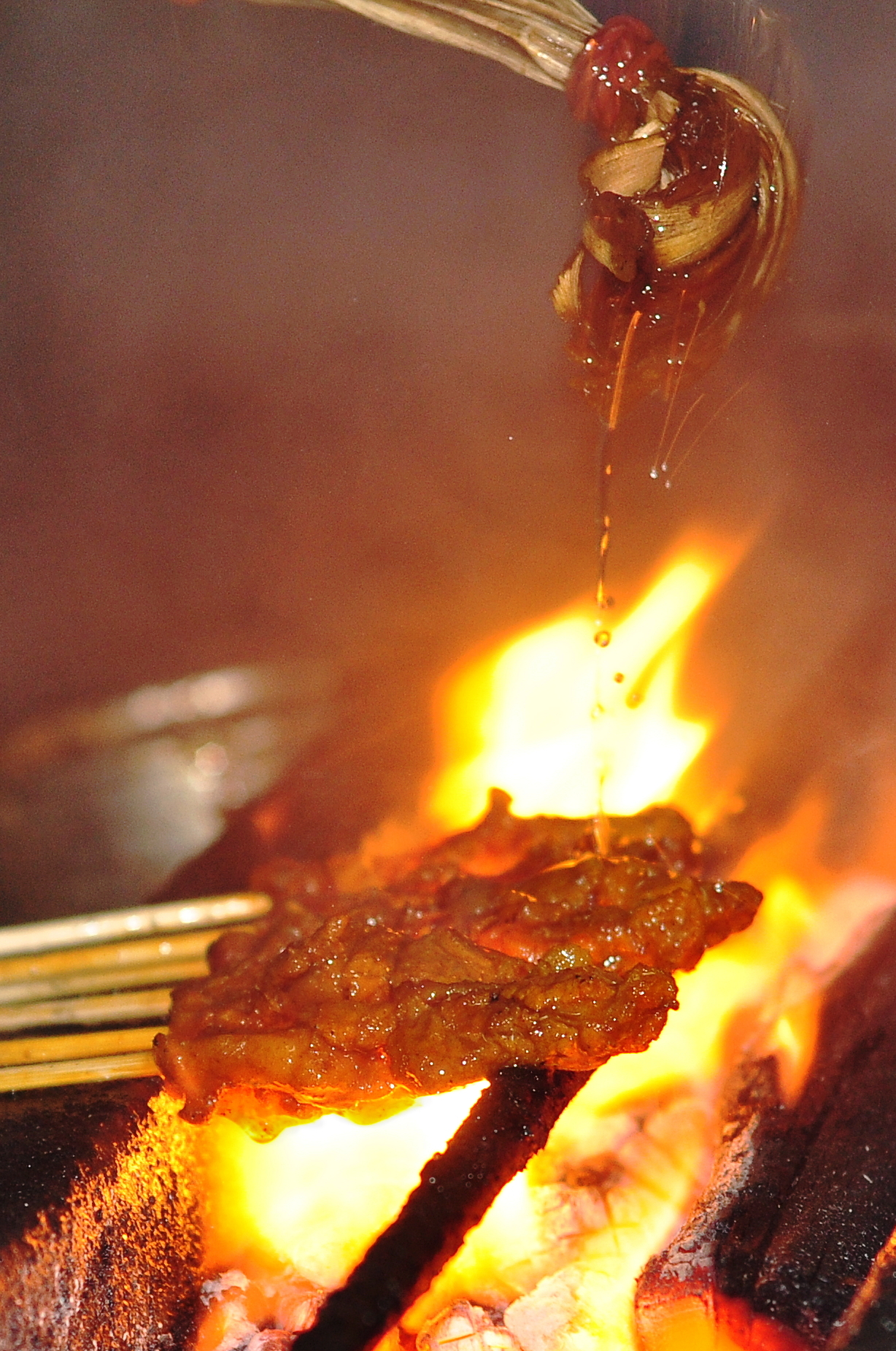
Applying sauce to satay with a brush made from bundled plant stems, Kota Kinabalu, Sabah, Malaysia.

Chicken is the most common meat used in satay, with other common choices including lamb, goat, mutton, beef, venison, and rabbit; seafood such as fish, shrimp, and squid; offal such as liver, intestine, and tripe, is also used. Most satay is made by cutting the meat into small thumb-size cubes, however, such recipes as Ponorogo use a single finger-like chicken fillet.

The skewers used for chicken satay are traditionally made from lidi, a midrib of coconut fronds. Bamboo skewers might be used instead. For firmer meats, such as lamb, goat, and beef, a thicker bamboo skewer is used. The skewers are usually soaked in water before using to avoid burning during grilling. Each skewer usually holds three or four pieces of meat. A goat meat satay might insert a cube of fat between meat cubes. Turmeric gives the dish its characteristic yellow colour. Another popular marinade is kecap manis (sweet soy sauce) mixed with coconut oil or palm margarine. The skewered meat is seasoned, marinated, and then grilled on charcoal embers.

Satay may be served with a spicy peanut sauce dip, or peanut gravy, served with slices of lontong or ketupat (rice cakes), garnished with a sprinkle of bawang goreng (crisp fried shallot), and accompanied by acar (pickles) consisting of slivers of onions, carrots, and cucumbers in vinegar, salt, and sugar solution. Mutton satay is usually served with kecap manis instead of peanut sauce. Pork satay can be served in a pineapple-based satay sauce or cucumber relish.

== Variations and availability ==
=== Indonesia ===
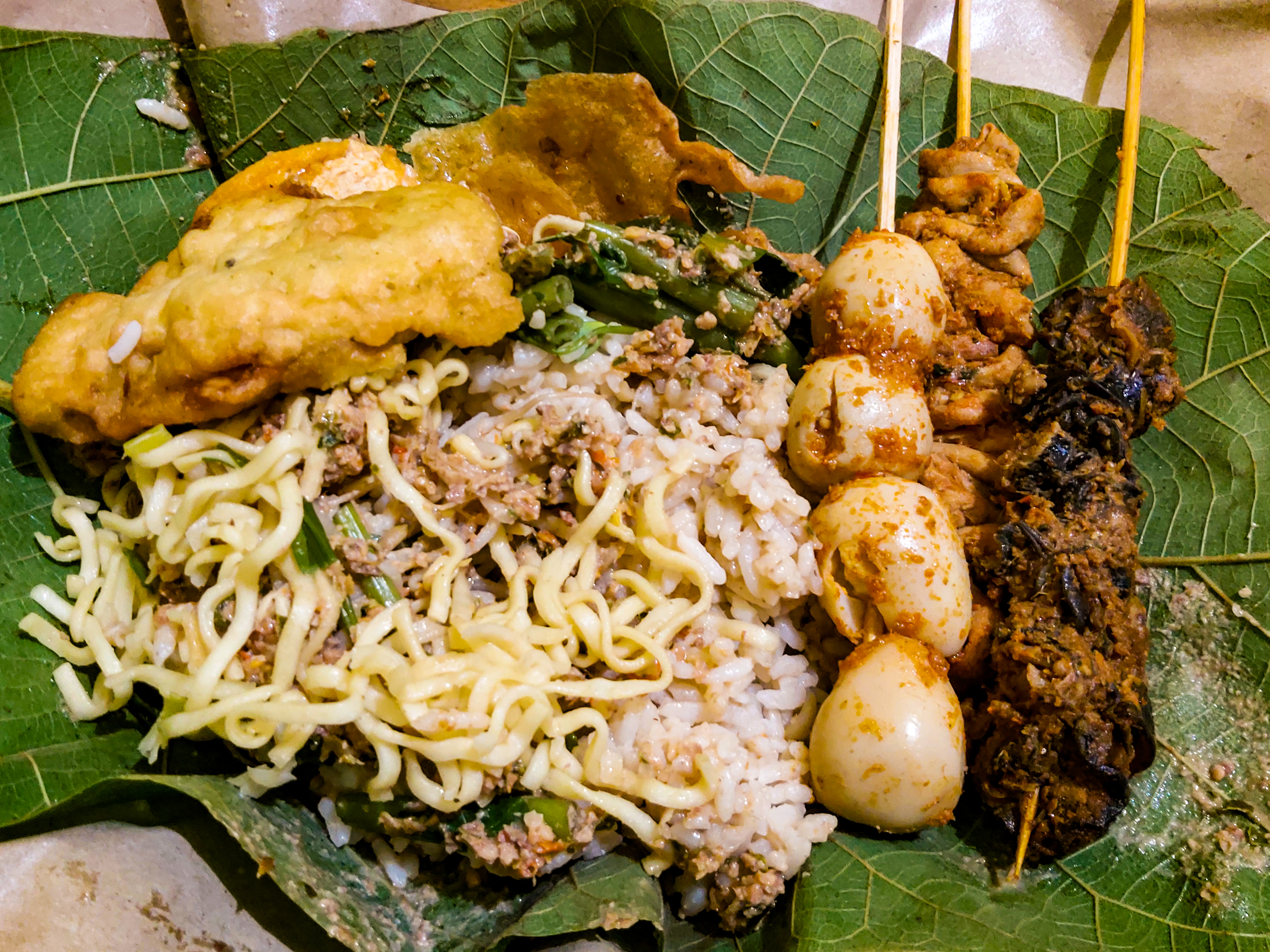
Nasi pecel served on a teak leaf with assorted side dishes including sate keong (conch satay), sate telur puyuh (quail egg satay) and sate usus (chicken intestine satay), Tuban, East Java, Indonesia.

Among the most widespread styles is chicken-based satay (sate ayam) and to a lesser, but still widespread extent, goat-based satay (sate kambing), which is found throughout the country and typically paired with peanut sauce and rice cakes such as lontong or ketupat and also well known as sate Madura, often characterised by sweet soy and peanut condiments also sate Ponorogo, prepared from thinly sliced marinated chicken, while Central Java’s sate Ambal is distinctive for its tempeh-based sauce. Other recognisable variants include sate Banjar from South Kalimantan, sate Blora from Central Java, and more recently, Jakarta popularised sate taichan, a minimalist style that omits peanuts and soy in favour of sambal and lime. Goat satay is also a common sight, especially in Java, and is often seasoned only lightly and served with sweet soy sauce, shallots and tomato.

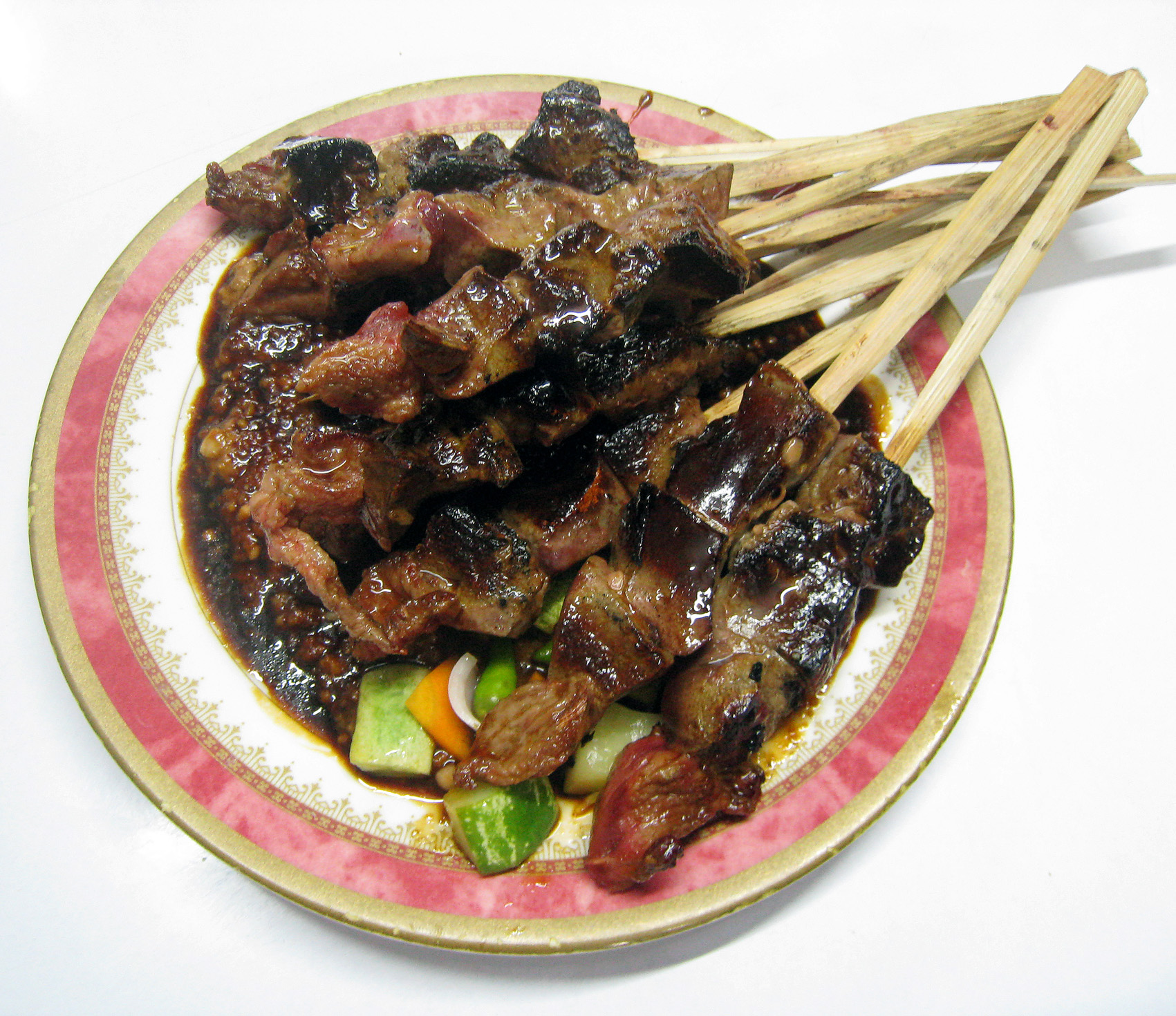
Goat liver satay (sate hati kambing)

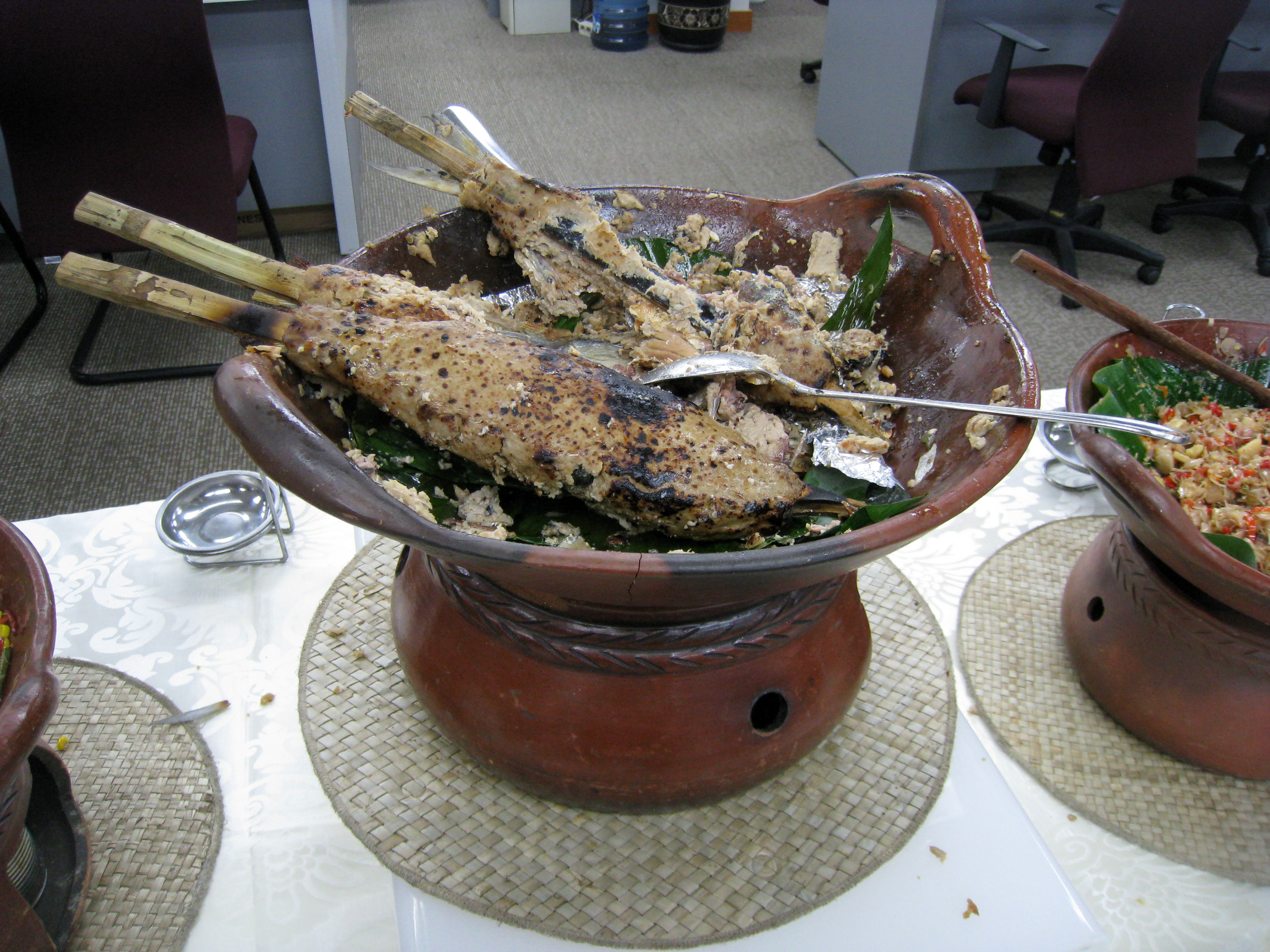
milkfish satay (Sate bandeng)

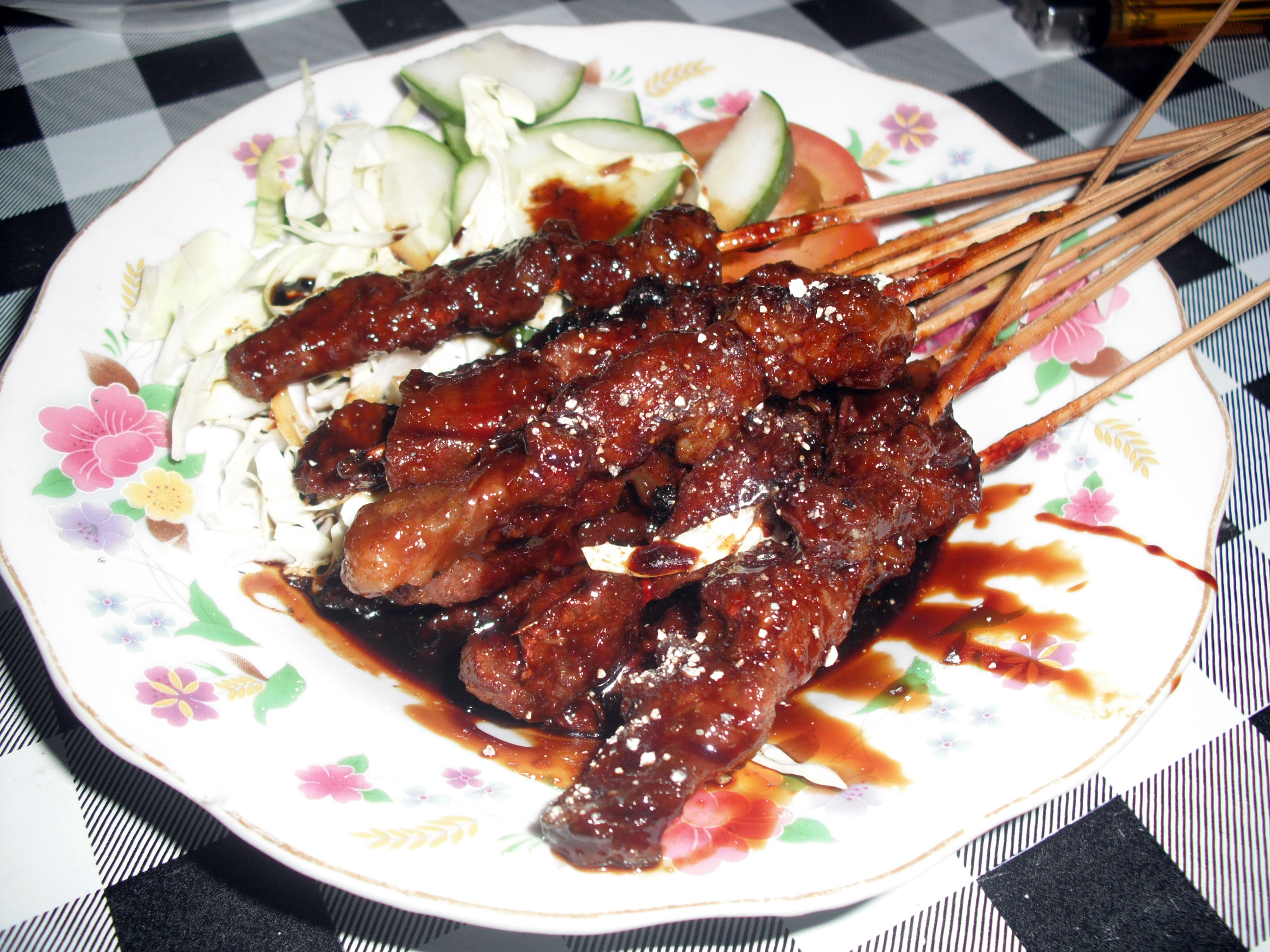
Horse meat satay (sate kuda)

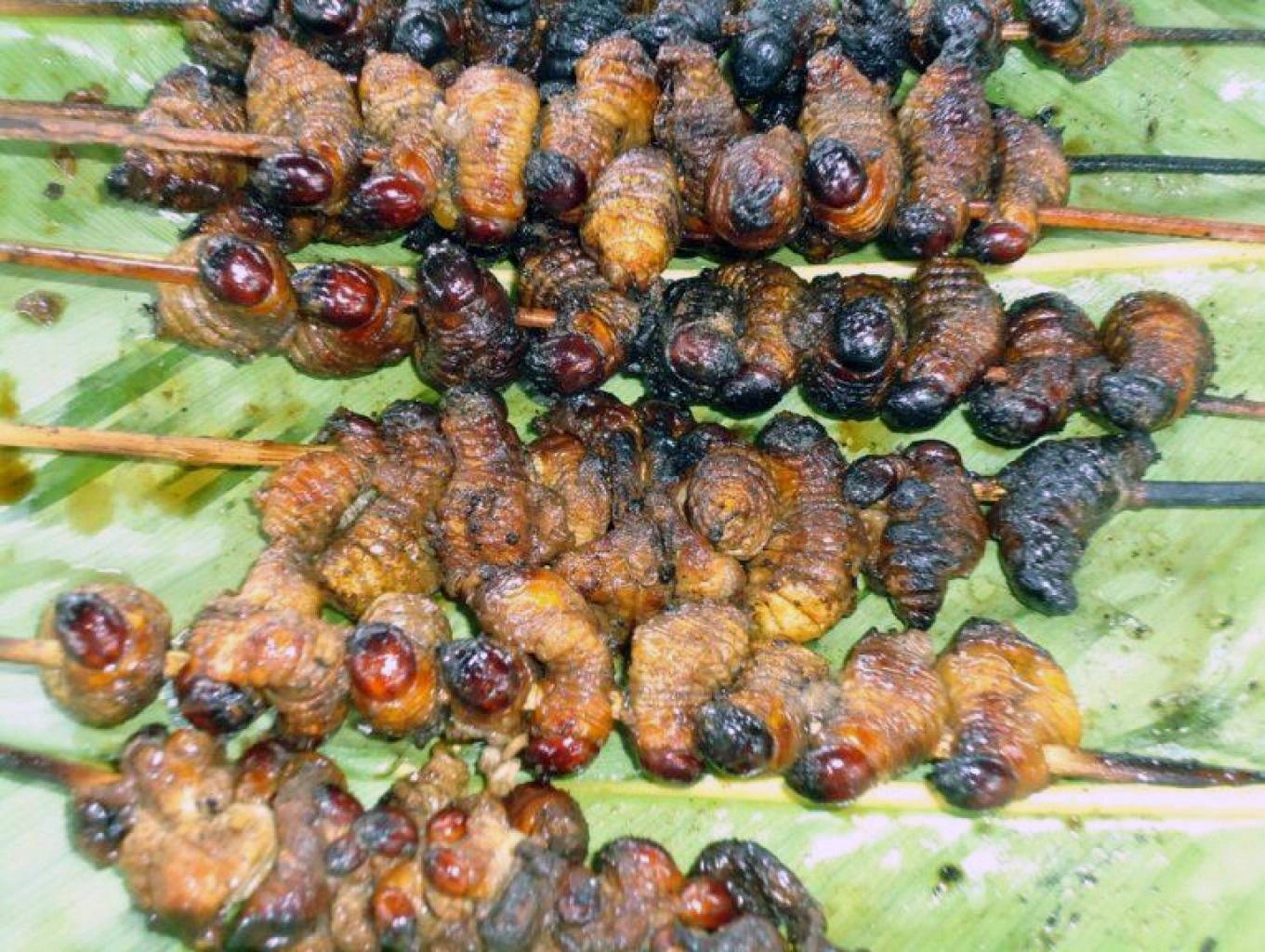
Sago grub satay (sate ulat sagu)

Regional adaptations of satay across the Indonesian archipelago

Equally significant are beef and mutton preparations. West Java’s sate maranggi is flavoured with kecombrang (torch ginger) buds, while sate buntel from Solo wraps minced meat in fat before grilling. In Lombok, strongly spiced dishes such as sate rembiga and sate bulayak are widely eaten, and in Aceh sate matang is served with broth or peanut sauce.

Coastal and island communities contributed further variety through fish and shellfish. Examples include sate bandeng (milkfish) from Banten, sate tanjung (tuna or trevally) from Lombok, sate kerang (cockles) from Medan and sate udang (shrimp). In Bali and Lombok, minced mixtures of meat or fish with grated coconut and spices are wrapped around lemongrass stalks to make sate lilit or sate pusut. Beyond seafood, regional adaptations also extend to other proteins: in Kudus, water buffalo is used in sate kerbau, while pork satay (sate babi) is common in Bali, North Sulawesi and among Chinese Indonesian communities. Rabbit, venison, and even horse meat are prepared in certain parts of Java and Kalimantan.

Less conventional forms highlight the versatility of satay. In West Sumatra, sate Padang combines meat or offal with a thick turmeric-based sauce, while South Sulawesi’s sate Makassar is flavoured with a sour tamarind marinade. Across Java, skewers may feature tripe (sate babat), liver (sate hati), intestines (sate usus), the latter of both are commonly available as a complementary dishes and is usually eaten paired with nasi uduk or udder (sate susu). More unusual and rare versions include turtle (sate bulus), snake (sate ular) and sago caterpillars (sate ulat sagu) in Papua and Kalimantan. Vegetarian adaptations, such as sate kere (tempeh satay) from Solo and sate jamur (mushroom satay), further demonstrate the adaptability of the dish within Indonesian food culture.

==== Availability in Indonesia ====
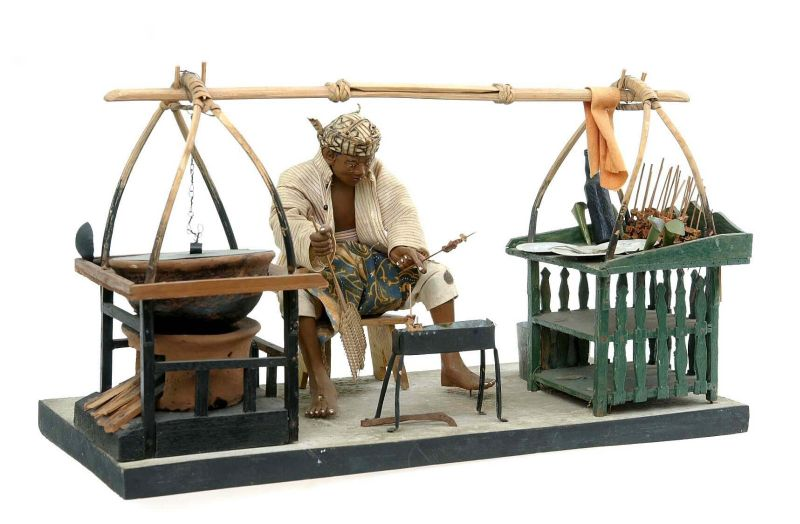
Model of satay seller using pikulan, collection of Tropenmuseum

Indonesia has developed one of the widest ranges of satay varieties, influenced by local ingredients, cultural practices and regional tastes. While chicken, beef and goat are the most common, numerous versions using seafood, offal and vegetarian ingredients are also found. Satay is prepared domestically, served in restaurants and sold by vendors in settings ranging from roadside warung and temporary stalls to travelling hawkers and online delivery services. Traditional selling methods include the pikulan (shoulder pole), sunggi (tray balanced on the head) and gerobak (wheeled cart) associated with Madurese vendors.

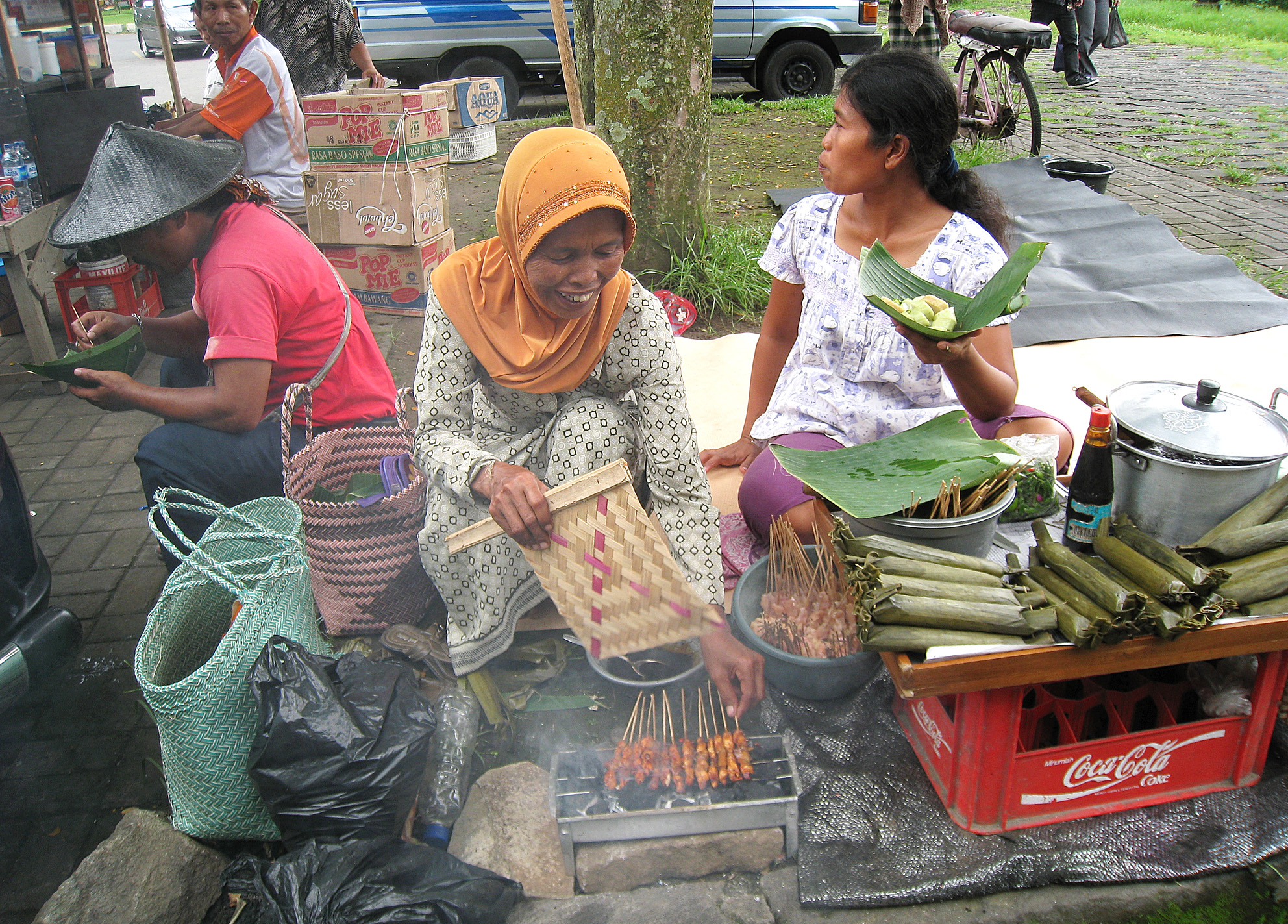
Javanese satay seller ladies with sunggi method sell their wares in the parking lot of Borobudur, Central Java

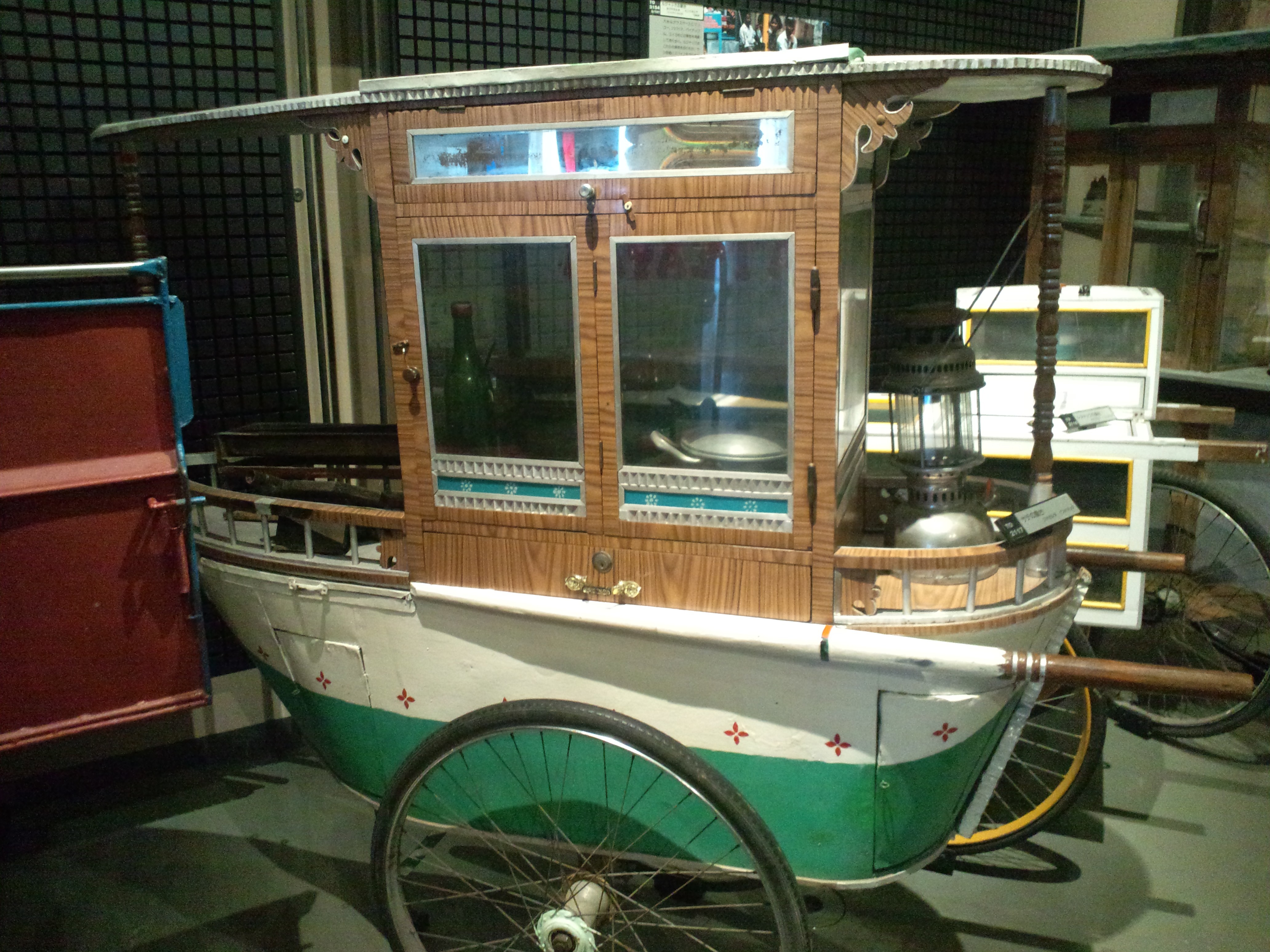
A boat-shaped gerobak (wheeled food cart) selling Madura satay

- Pikulan: In Indonesian, pikulan means carrying items by balancing a rod on one's shoulder. The most traditional way of selling satay was depicted in early photographs of Java in the late 19th century, showing the travelling satay vendor using this pikulan which resembles two small wooden cabinets carried with a rod made of either bamboo, wood, or rattan.
- Sunggi: In Javanese, sunggi means carrying things upon one's head using some kind of tray or platter. This practice is quite common in today's Bali and rural Java. The sunggi satay vendors—usually women—carry raw satays, lontongs, peanut sauce upon the wooden or wicker bamboo tray on their head, while carrying basket containing grill, charcoal, bamboo fan, sweet soy sauce bottle, and wooden small short chair called dingklik. The satay seller ladies may walk through residential areas or position their wares in busy areas (e.g. marketplace or tourism area), and grill the satay to their customer's order.
- Gerobak: In Indonesian, gerobak means wheeled cart. It is one of the common method of selling satay by travelling vendors. The Madura satay vendor cart usually has unique boat-like shape gerobak food cart.
- Warung: In Indonesian, warung means modest shop, selling foods or other things. The most common satay warung usually are warung tenda, modest tarp-tent shop stationed in busy street side to await customers.
- Online satay: In recent years with the advent of digital multi-service methods that include food delivery such as GoFood and GrabFood, satay is available by ordering online, and the food is immediately delivered by a motorcycle taxi or ojek.

In addition to street vending, dedicated establishment chains such as Sate Khas Senayan, Sate Memeng, and Sate Kambing Pak Manto specialise in satay.

=== Malaysia ===
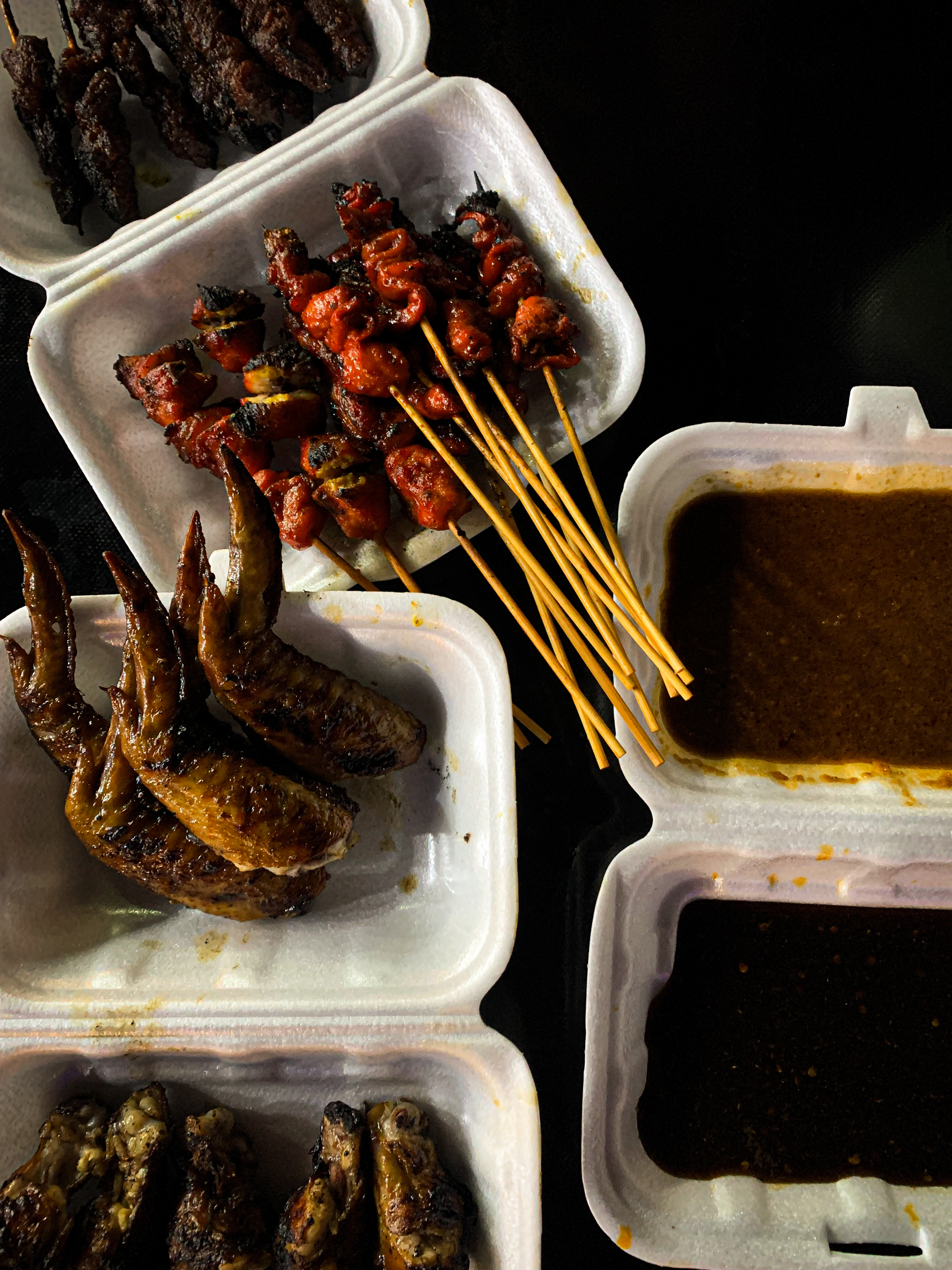
Assorted Cocos Malay-styled satay in Tawau, Sabah, including chicken skin, bishop's nose (tail) and mutton satay, served alongside roasted chicken wings; typically accompanied by peanut sauce (kuah kacang) and soy–chilli dip (sambal kicap).

Known locally as sate in Malay (pronounced similarly to the English "satay"), the dish is widely available throughout Malaysia, both in restaurants and from hawkers in food courts and pasar malam (night markets). Beef and chicken are the most common types, often served with peanut sauce, compressed rice cakes (ketupat), cucumber and onions. While sate is strongly associated with Malay Muslim food traditions, pork satay is also prepared in non-halal Chinese establishments.

Kajang, a town in Selangor, has become particularly well known for its satay. The term sate Kajang refers to a style distinguished by larger chunks of meat and the accompaniment of peanut sauce with a side of fried chilli paste. Its popularity has led to the spread of Kajang-style satay across Malaysia. Stalls and restaurants in Kajang and beyond also offer a wide range of alternatives, including venison, rabbit, fish, gizzard, liver and other varieties. History has it was introduced by the late Tasnim Kasiban along with his brother Rono in 1917. Since then, this legacy has been passed down through the generations.

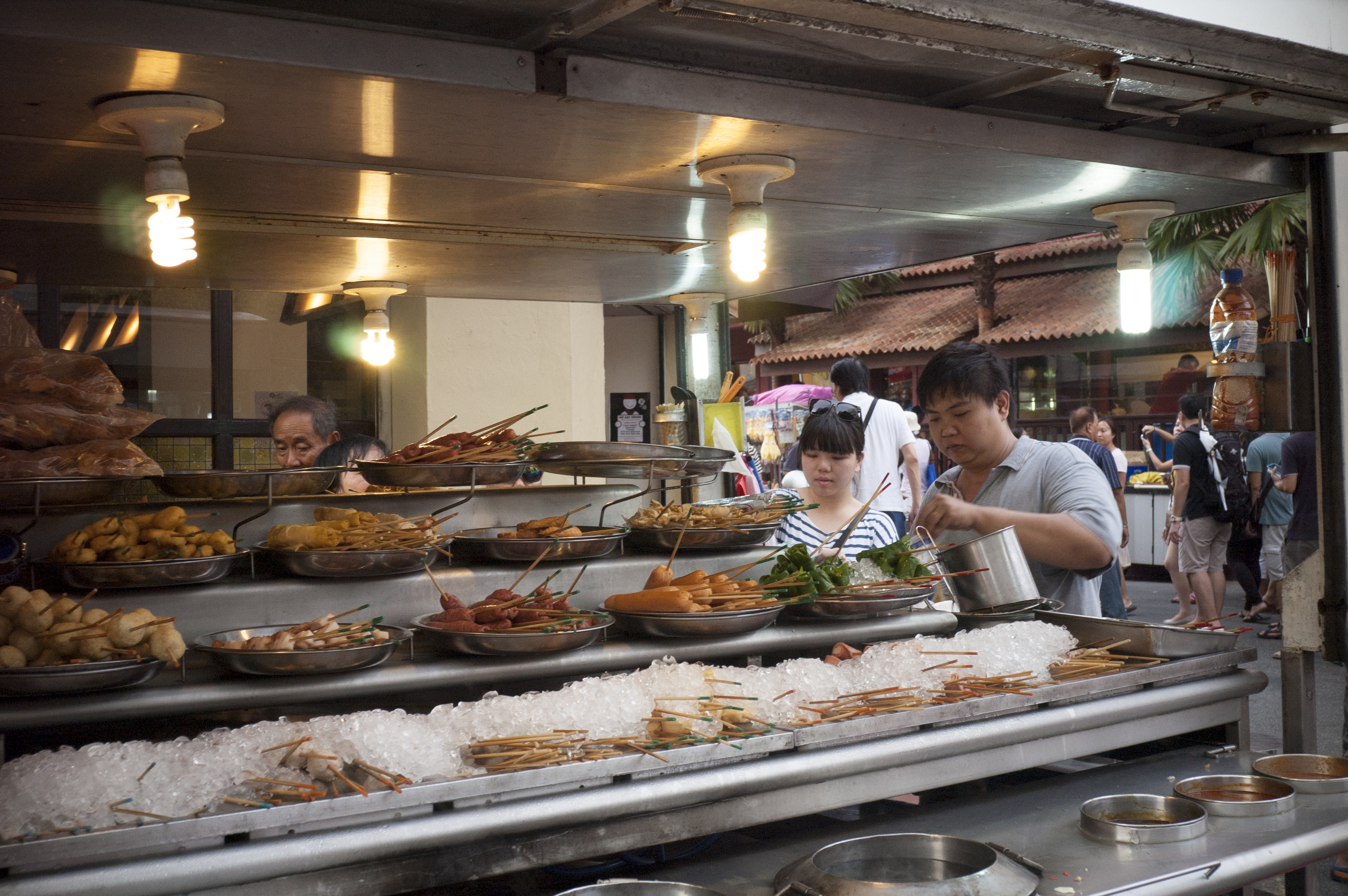
An array of lok-lok skewers, a Chinese–Malaysian variant of satay.

Other notable Malaysian adaptations include sate lok-lok from Penang and sate celup from Malacca, both of which represent Malaysian Chinese fusions of satay with hotpot traditions. In these dishes, raw meats, seafood, vegetables, tofu, and offal are skewered on sticks and cooked by dipping them in boiling water, stock, or satay sauce. Sate lok-lok refers to skewers dipped in stock and eaten with sauce on the side, while sate celup describes skewers cooked directly in peanut sauce. These versions are usually sold by street vendors or in casual eateries, and are commonly non-halal.

Distinctive regional traditions also exist. On the east coast of Peninsular Malaysia, especially in Kelantan, Terengganu and coastal Pahang, lokching (also known as sate ikan or fish satay) forms part of the local identity. In Sabah, Cocos Malay migrants contributed their own style of sate Cocos, which has been incorporated into the state's culinary repertoire.

=== Singapore ===
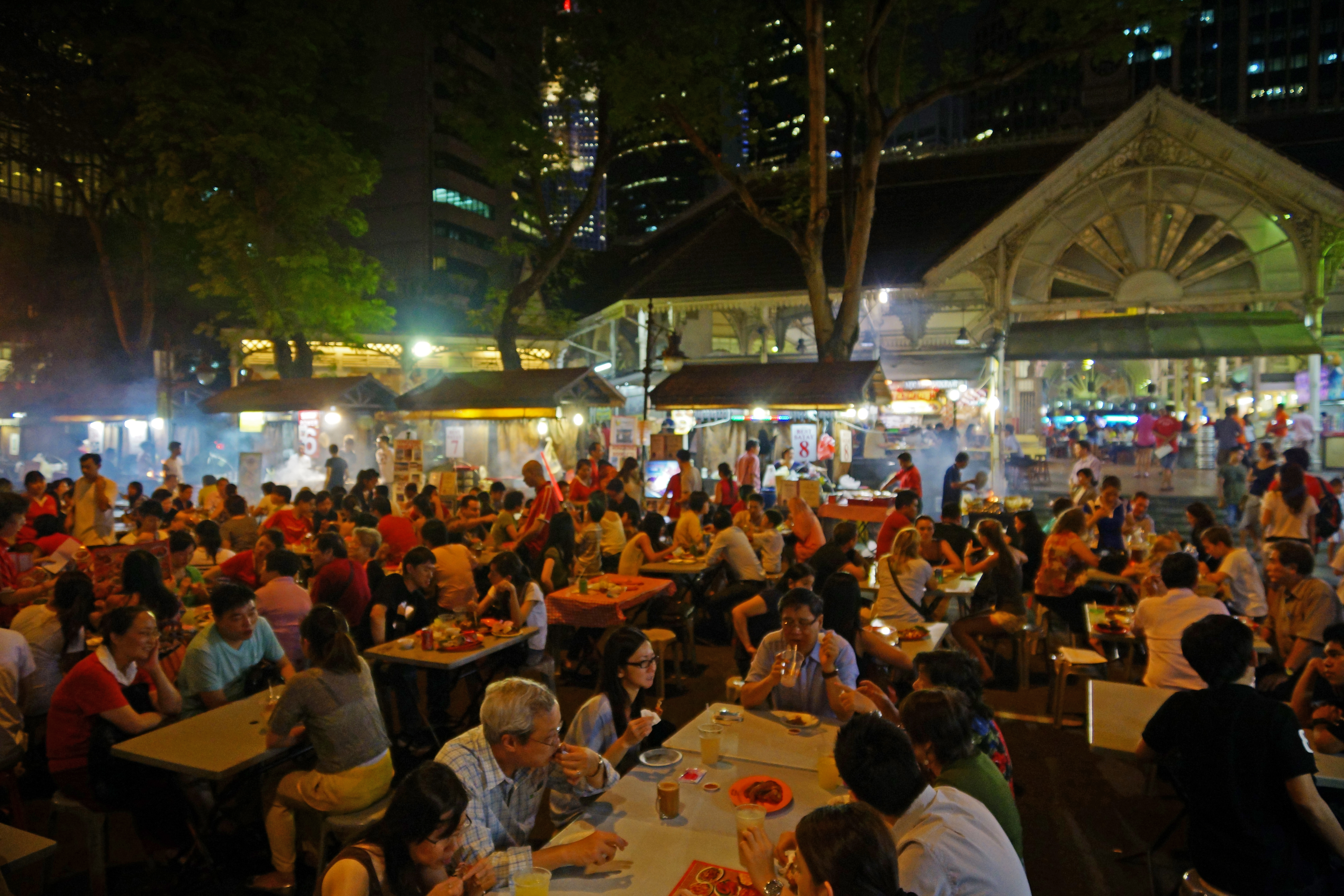
Satay stalls along Boon Tat Street beside Telok Ayer Market, Singapore.

In Singapore, satay is prepared and sold by Malay, Chinese and Indian Muslim vendors. It is generally thought to have originated in Java and was introduced to the island by Muslim traders. By the 1940s, satay had become one of the most popular street foods in Singapore, often consumed at festive occasions. Traditionally sold from roadside stalls and pushcarts, concerns over hygiene and urban redevelopment in the 1950s led to the centralisation of vendors at Beach Road, in a cluster later known as the "Satay Club". The stalls were relocated in the 1960s to Esplanade Park, where they became a fixture in tourist guides until their eventual removal in the late 1990s to make way for the Esplanade, Theatres on the Bay.

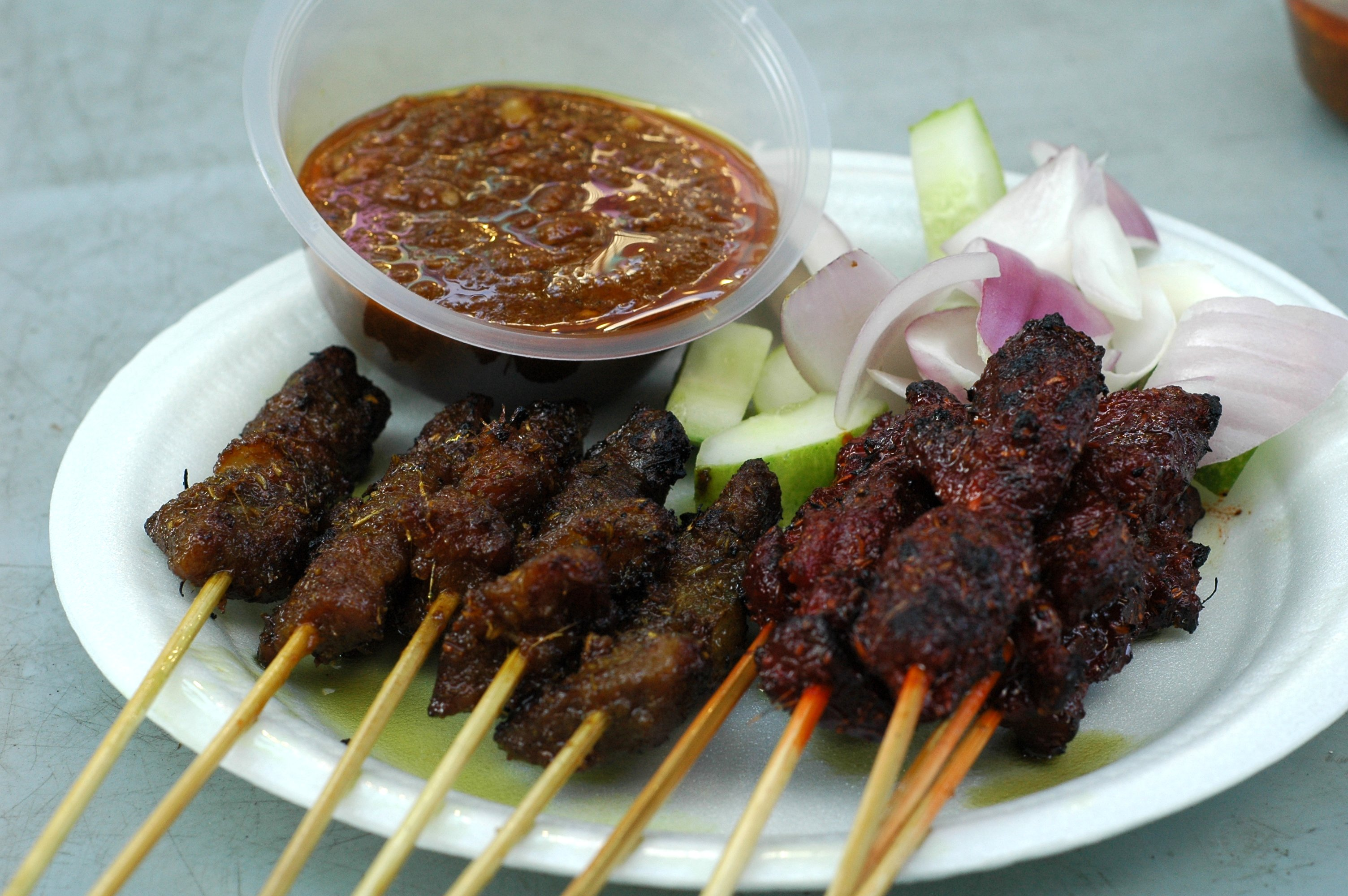
Singapore-style satay served at the Satay Club in Lau Pa Sat, Singapore.

The concept of satay dining established by the Satay Club, open air, communal and available primarily at night, remains influential in Singapore's food culture. While the name was transferred to Clarke Quay after the closure of the Esplanade site, other satay centres emerged, such as the stalls at Lau Pa Sat and the establishment of "Satay Street" on Boon Tat Street in 1996, where hawkers serve satay after 7 pm when the road is closed to traffic. These venues are often seen as evoking the atmosphere of mid twentieth century street dining. Contemporary adaptations include Satay by the Bay, located at Gardens by the Bay, which explicitly models itself on the old Satay Club.

Singaporean satay is usually served with peanut sauce, but regional and cultural differences are reflected in its variations. Malay satay resembles Javanese versions and is often marinated with kecap manis, while Chinese Hainanese satay is distinct for its use of pineapple purée sauce and five spice seasoning. Common varieties include chicken (satay ayam), beef (satay lembu), mutton (satay kambing), as well as beef intestine (satay perut) and beef tripe (satay babat). Beyond street and hawker settings, satay has also been incorporated into national branding, with Singapore Airlines serving satay as an appetiser in its First and Business Class cabins.

=== Thailand ===
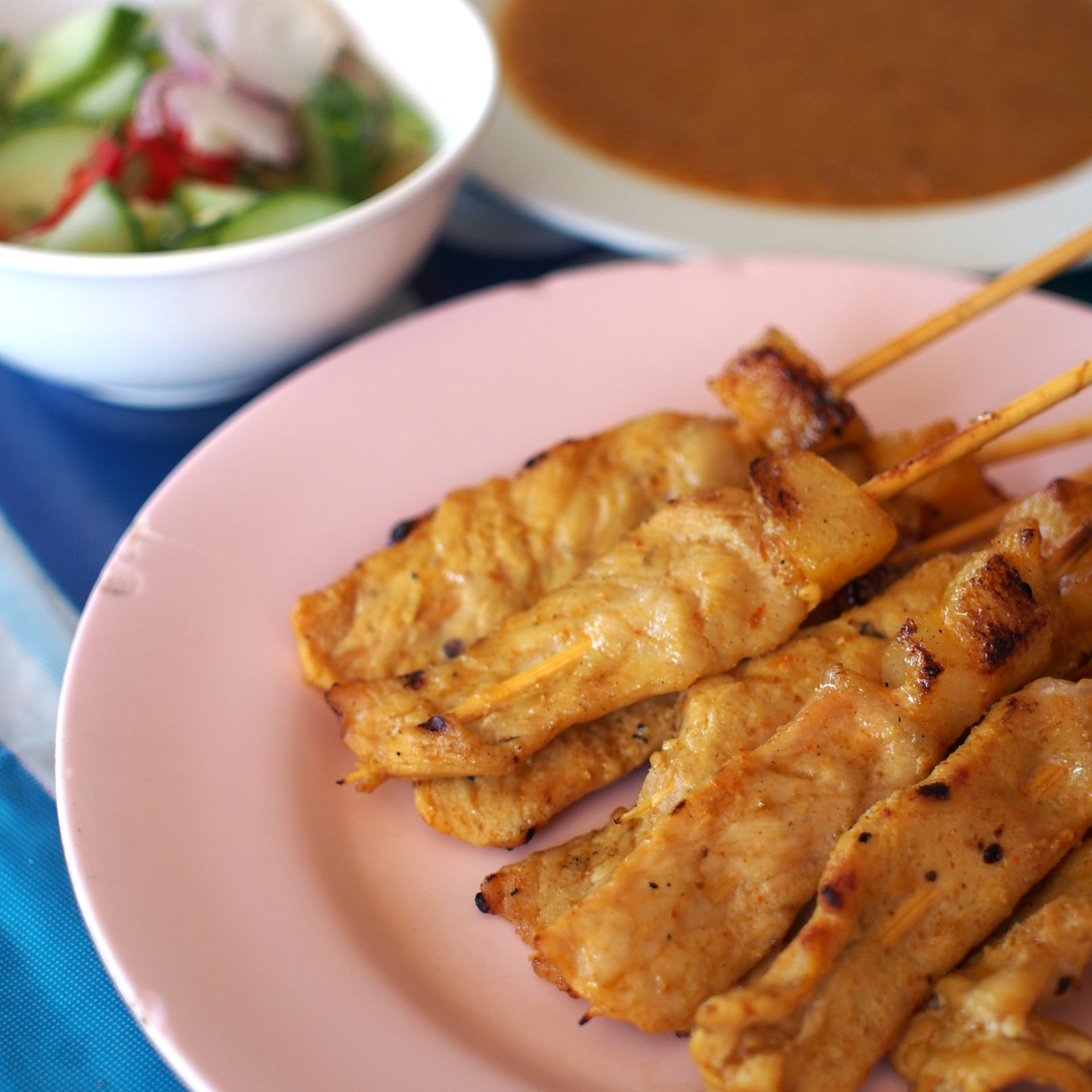
Thai pork satay served with peanut sauce and pickled cucumber relish.

Satay (Thai: สะเต๊ะ, RTGS: sate, pronounced [sā.téʔ]) is a popular dish in Thailand, where pork satay is particularly common alongside chicken and beef varieties. Thai versions are usually served with peanut sauce and achat (pickled cucumber relish), and other adaptations include hoi malaeng phu, made with mussels, as well as vegetarian forms using soy protein or tofu.

Satay is widely available in Thai restaurants internationally. Due to the global prominence of Thai cuisine, it is frequently associated with Thailand abroad, and there is a common misconception that the dish originated there. In the United States, for instance, satay is often described as one of the most popular Thai dishes.

The first satay restaurant in Thailand was established in front of the Chaloem Buri Theater near Yaowarat’s Chaloem Buri Intersection, before later relocating to Rama IV Road near Lumphini MRT station, where it has operated for more than 50 years.

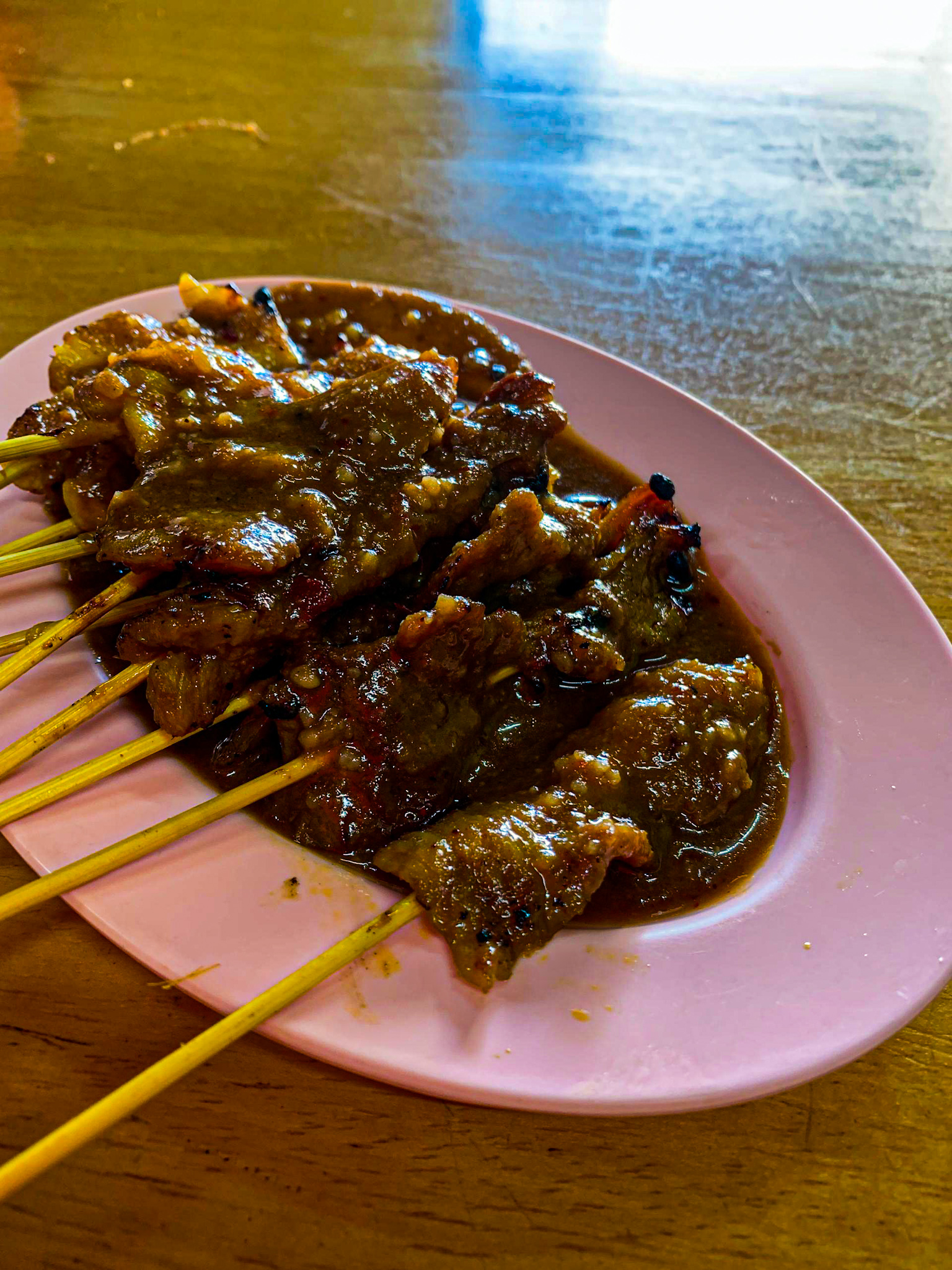
Pattani Malay-style chicken and beef satay served with peanut sauce in Pattani, Thailand

In southern Thailand, particularly in Pattani, Yala and Narathiwat, satay has developed under influence from the Malay Peninsula. In these Muslim-majority areas, regional varieties are generally halal, with beef and chicken being the most commonly used meats, reflecting Malay culinary traditions.

=== Philippines ===
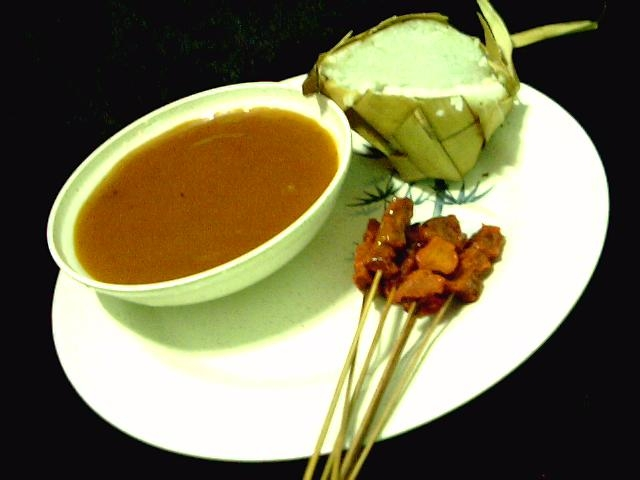
Satti among Muslim Filipinos is typically served with ta'mu (pusô) and a bowlful of peanut-based sauce.

Satay proper is known as satti in the Southern Philippines (Mindanao). It is common in the regions of Zamboanga, Sulu Archipelago and Tawi-Tawi, which acquired satay from its proximity to Malaysia. Satti usually only has three small strips of roasted meat on a stick. Satti is usually made from chicken or beef among Muslim Filipinos, but it can also be made with pork or liver. It is particularly popular in Tausug cuisine and is commonly eaten as breakfast in restaurants which specialise in satti. It is typically served with ta'mu (pusô in other Philippine languages) and a bowlful of warm peanut-based sauce.

In the majority of the Philippines, a similar (but native) dish to satay usually made with pork or chicken is referred to as inihaw or inasal, or by the generic English name "barbecue" (usually shortened to "BBQ"). It is usually served glazed in a sweet-soy sauce marinade reminiscent of yakitori. Despite the native origins of inasal and inihaw, the English association of "barbecue" is the source of names for other popular street foods that are also served skewered, such as banana cue ("banana" + "barbecue") and camote cue ("camote (sweet potato) + barbecue").

Offal-based versions of inihaw are also commonly sold in the Philippines as street food. The most popular are made from chicken or pork intestines known as isaw. Other variants use liver, tripe, lungs, chicken heads and feet, cubes of coagulated pork blood, and pork ears, among others.

Annatto seeds and banana ketchup-based sauces are also widely used which gives the meat a vibrant orange or red color.

=== Netherlands ===
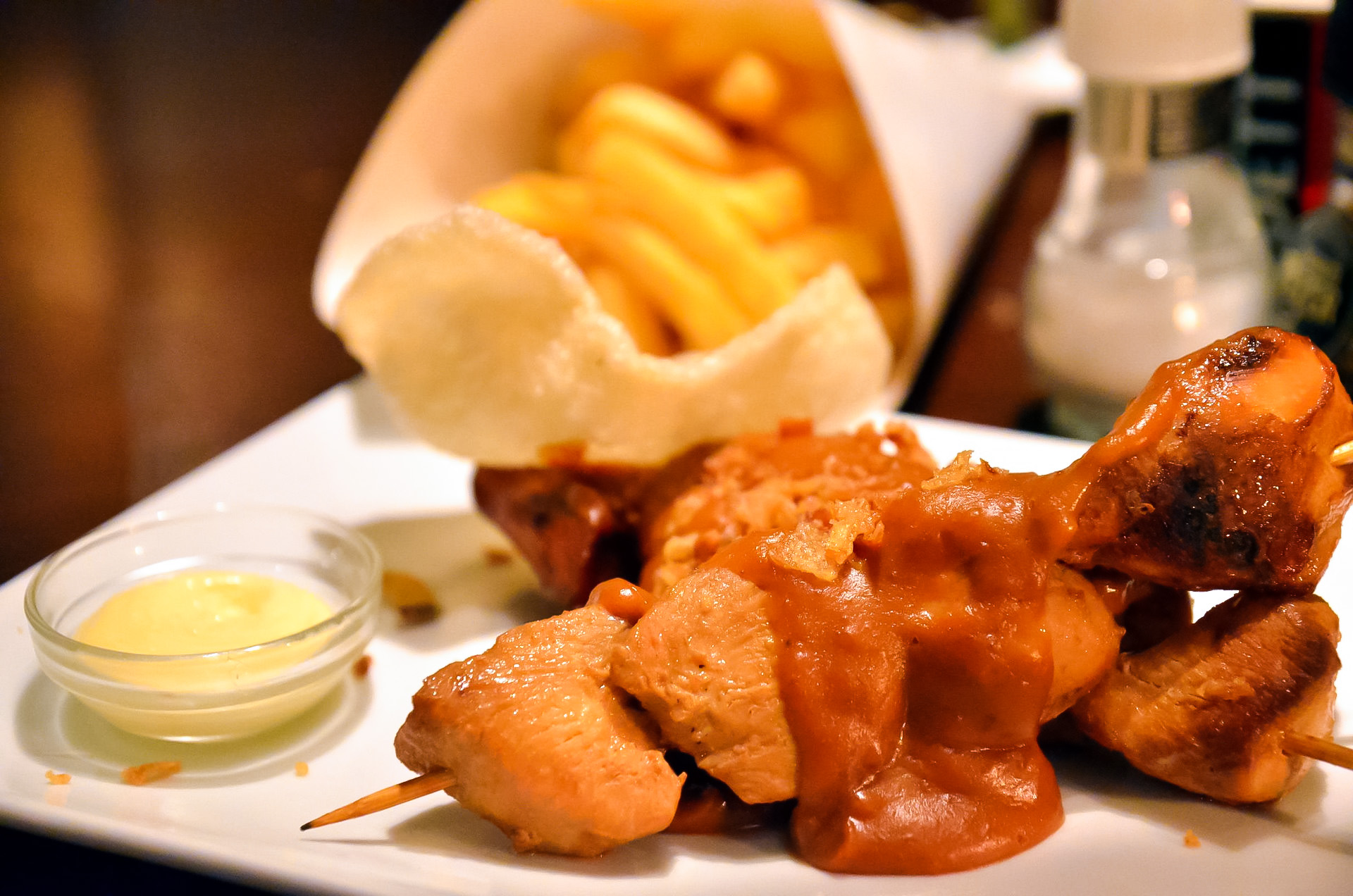
Chicken satay in the Netherlands with peanut sauce, French fries, prawn crackers and mayonnaise; as served in Amsterdam

Known as saté or sateh, it is fully adapted in Dutch everyday cuisine. Owing to their shared colonial history, satay is an Indonesian food that has become an integral part of Dutch cuisine. Pork and chicken satays are almost solely served with spicy peanut sauce and called een sateetje, and are readily available in snackbars and supermarkets. Versions with goat-meat (sateh kambing) and sweet soy sauce are available in Indonesian restaurants and take-aways. Pork or chicken satay in peanut sauce, with salad and French-fries, is popular in pubs or eetcafés. With Indonesian take-away meals like nasi goreng speciaal, the special part is often a couple of sate-sticks.

Another favourite in Dutch snackbars is the satékroket, a croquette made with a peanut sauce and shredded meat ragout. In addition, 'saté' sauce or peanut sauce has become one of the standard options as a condiment to accompany a portion of fries bought in a snackbar (besides mayonnaise, ketchup, curry-ketchup, 'joppiesaus' or a combination). Fries with satay sauce is commonly known as patatje pinda ('fries peanut') and fries with satay sauce, mayo and chopped unions is called patatje oorlog ('fries').

=== South Africa ===
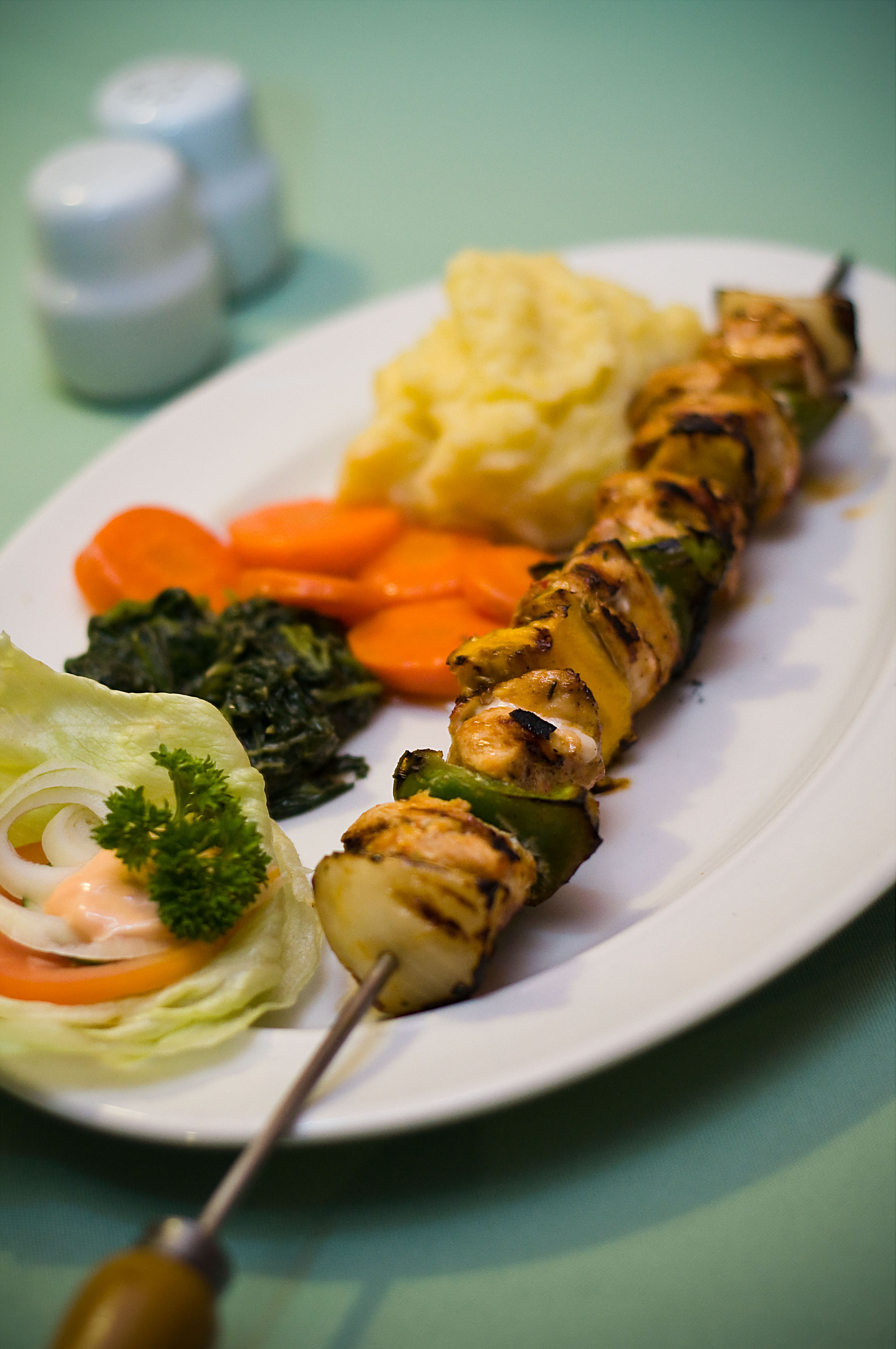
Chicken sosatie, a South African skewered dish of Cape Malay origin.

In South Africa, a well-known variation of satay is sosatie, a Cape Malay dish consisting of marinated meat, traditionally lamb or mutton, skewered and grilled over a braai (barbecue). The name combines sate (skewered meat) with saus (sauce), reflecting its Malay Indonesian influence brought through Cape Malay cuisine. Unlike Southeast Asian satay, sosaties are typically marinated overnight in a mixture that may include onions, chillies, garlic, curry leaves and tamarind juice, and are often interspersed with ingredients such as dried apricots, peppers or onions, giving the dish a distinctive sweet savoury profile.

=== Suriname ===
Satay is also popular in Suriname, where it was introduced by Javanese migrants during the colonial period. Brought by contract workers from the Dutch East Indies in the late 19th and early 20th centuries, the dish became a part of Surinamese cuisine and is commonly known as sate. It is widely sold by street vendors and in restaurants, often served with peanut sauce, slices of white bread, lontong (rice cakes), or fried rice. Variants include chicken, beef, and goat satay, reflecting both Javanese culinary traditions and local adaptations. Through the Surinamese diaspora, particularly in the Netherlands, satay has also become a familiar component of Dutch-Indonesian cuisine.

=== Sri Lanka ===
In Sri Lanka, satay was introduced by Malay communities who migrated to the island during the Dutch and British colonial periods. Known locally as sate or satay, it is usually made with chicken or beef, marinated in spices such as turmeric, coriander, and garlic, and grilled over charcoal or open flames. It is commonly served with peanut sauce, sambal, or other condiments.

Satay is an important part of Sri Lankan Malay culture, served at religious festivals, weddings, and other communal gatherings. Over time, it has also become popular in urban areas like Colombo, appearing in street food stalls and restaurants and enjoyed by a wider audience beyond the Malay community.

=== Saudi Arabia ===
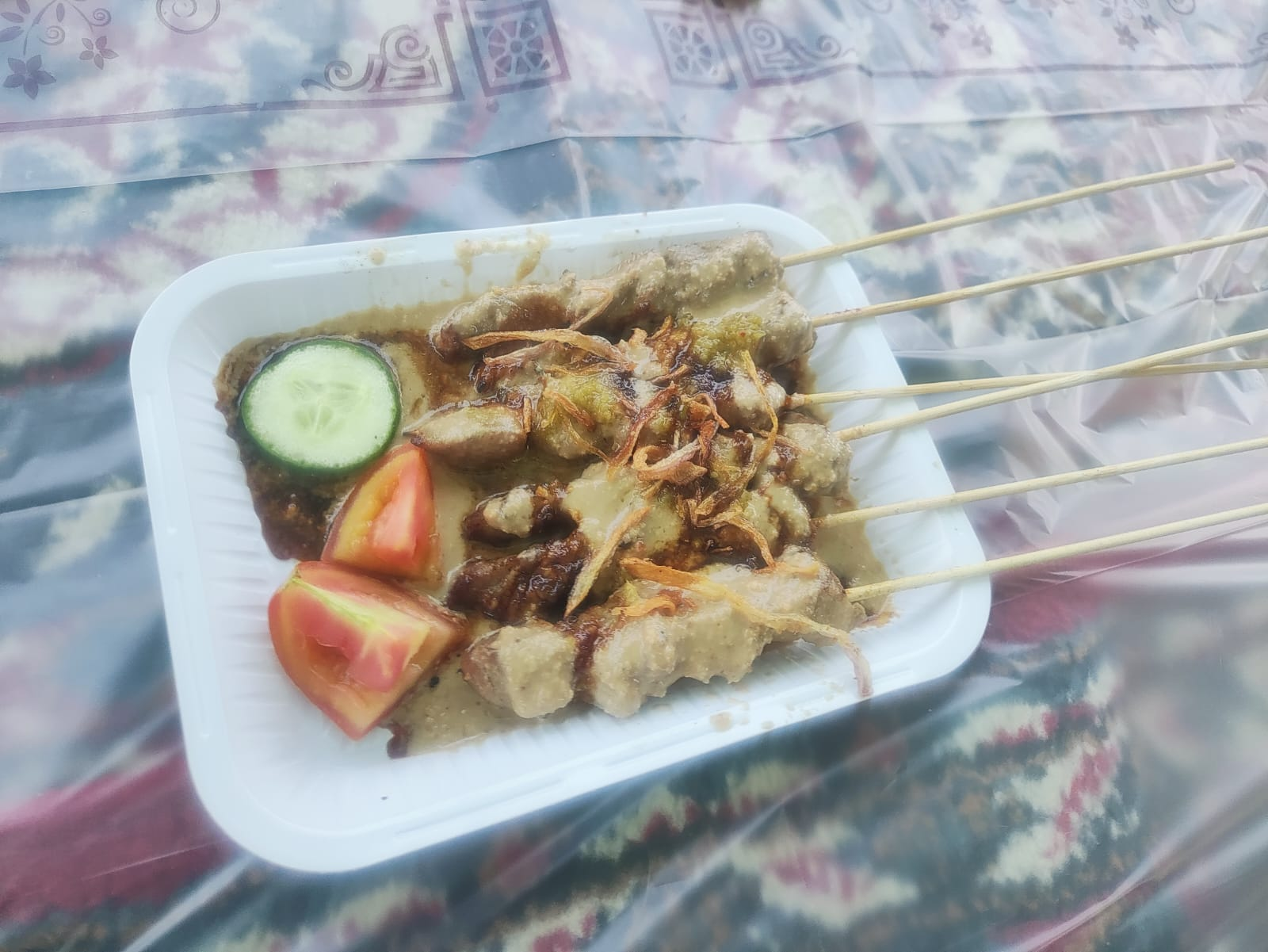
Sate unta made of camel meat in Taif, Mecca Province

Indonesian diaspora in Saudi Arabia created satay made of camel meat called sate unta. This dish is commonly found in Taif, Mecca Province. The satay is served with a slightly runny peanut sauce as well as cucumber, tomato, and bawang goreng as condiments.

=== Fusion satay ===
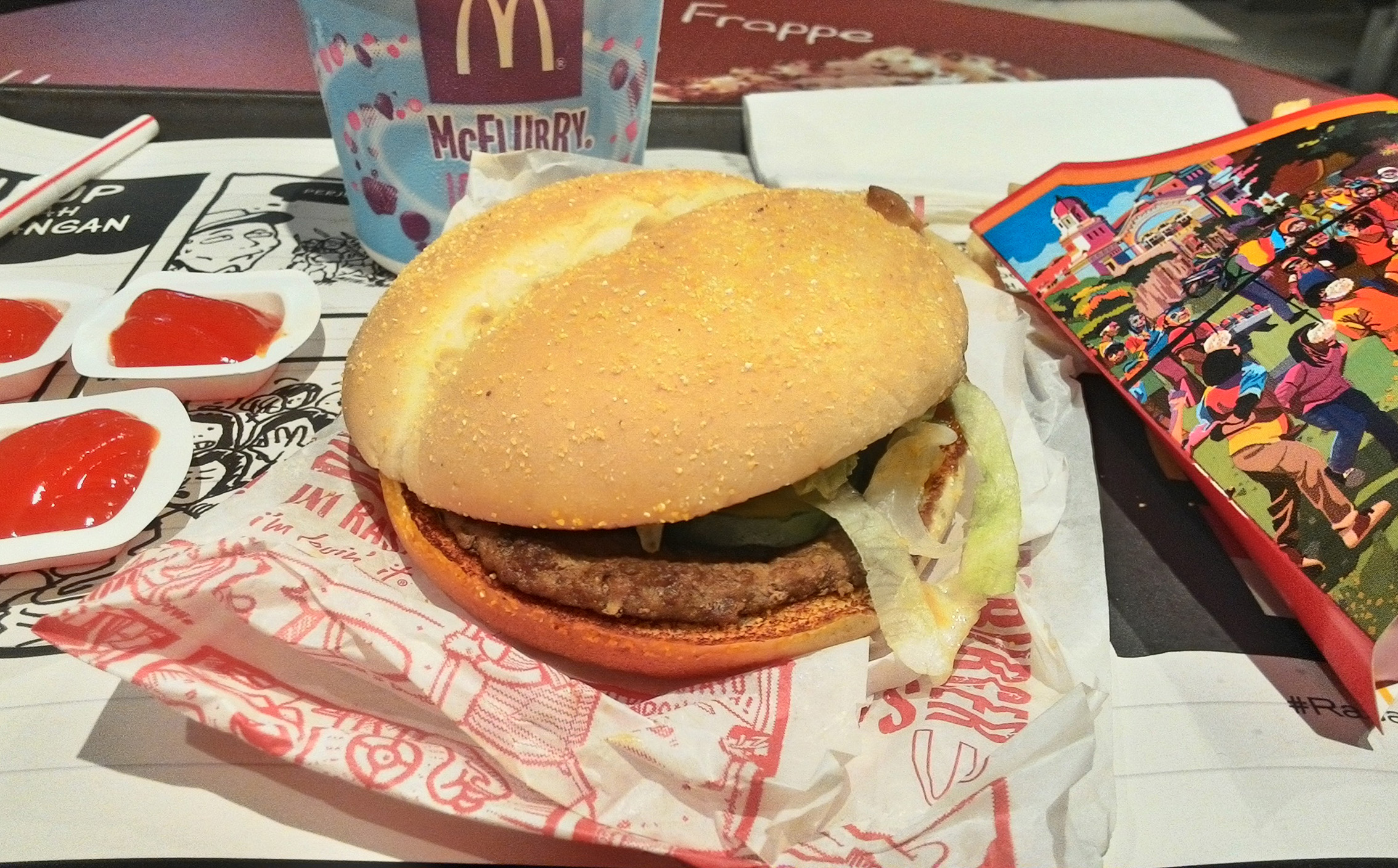
McDonald's burger sate (satay burger) in Indonesia, which is beef burger served with peanut sauce

Traditionally, satay referred to any grilled skewered meats with various sauces; it is not necessarily served solely with peanut sauce. However, since the most popular variant of satay is chicken satay in peanut sauce (Sate Madura in Indonesia), in modern fusion cuisine the term "satay" has shifted to satay style peanut sauce instead.

For example, the fusion "satay burger" refers to beef hamburger served with so-called "satay sauce", which is mainly a kind of sweet and spicy peanut sauce or often replaced with gloppy peanut butter. The Singapore satay bee hoon is actually rice vermicelli served in peanut sauce. The American-Thai fusion fish fillet in satay sauce also demonstrates the same trend. The fusion French cuisine Cuisses de Grenouilles Poelees au Satay, Chou-fleur Croquant is actually frog legs in peanut sauce. The Indomie instant noodle is also available in satay flavour, which is only the addition of peanut sauce in its packet. In Hong Kong, satay sauce is usually served with instant noodles or macaroni, and stir-fried beef. This dish is most often eaten for breakfast.

== In culture ==
=== Indonesia ===
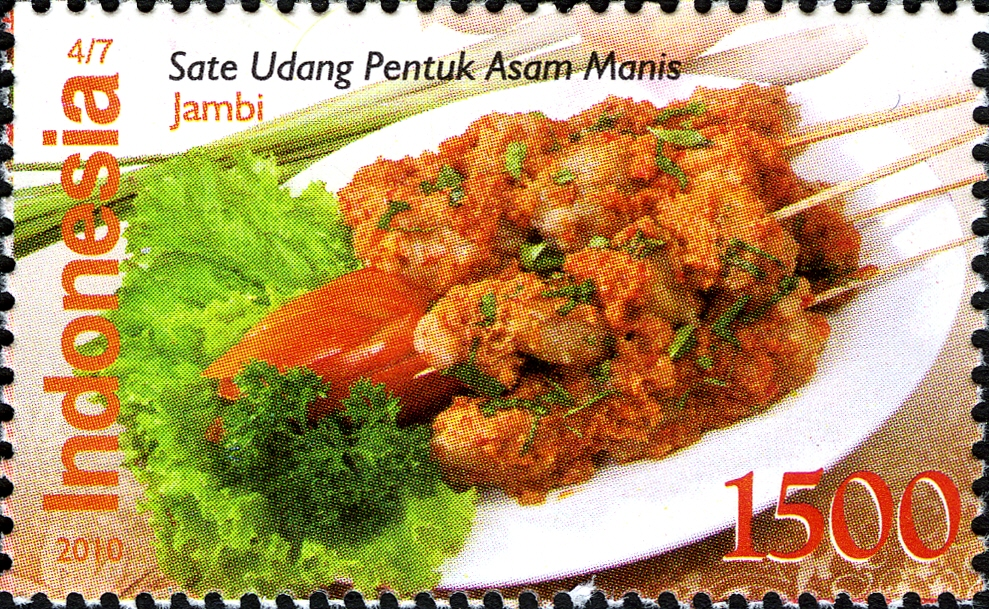
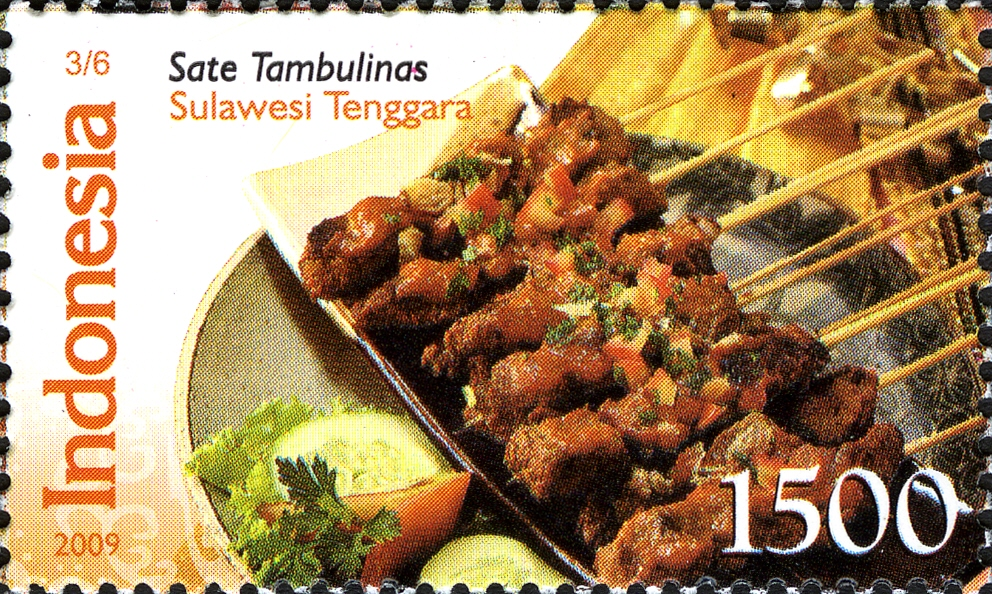
Indonesian stamps depicting satay

Satay belongs to the informal ethnocultural symbols of Indonesia. Its appears on Indonesian postage stamps, in tourist brochures, information and advertising materials dedicated to this country, and is often played up by Indonesian participants in various cultural and entertainment events held abroad to create a national flavor. For example, the Indonesian model Aurra Kharisma performed in 2021 at the Miss Grand International beauty pageant in a suit with satay images and a headdress decorated with several bundles of satay meat skewers.

In some parts of Indonesia, certain types of satay are attributed with different symbolic meanings. Especially Bali stands out: the popular on this island sate lilit—minced sausages stuck on lemongrass stalks—is considered there a symbol of several virtues and benefits at once: male prowess, unity and prosperity. The Balinese attribute the embodiment of the weapons of various Hindu deities and mythological heroes to other local types of satay.

In Bandung, the West Java Governor's office is popularly called Gedung Sate (Indonesian: Satay building) to refer the satay-like pinnacle on its roof.

== See also ==
- Brochette – Thin stick used to hold pieces of food together
- Satay building – Public building in West Java, Indonesia
- List of chicken dishes
- Pinchitos – Southern Spain skewered meat dish
- Shacha sauce, also known as Sate-sauce – Chinese condiment
- Yakitori – Japanese type of grilled chicken
