= Satay celup =

Malaysian dish

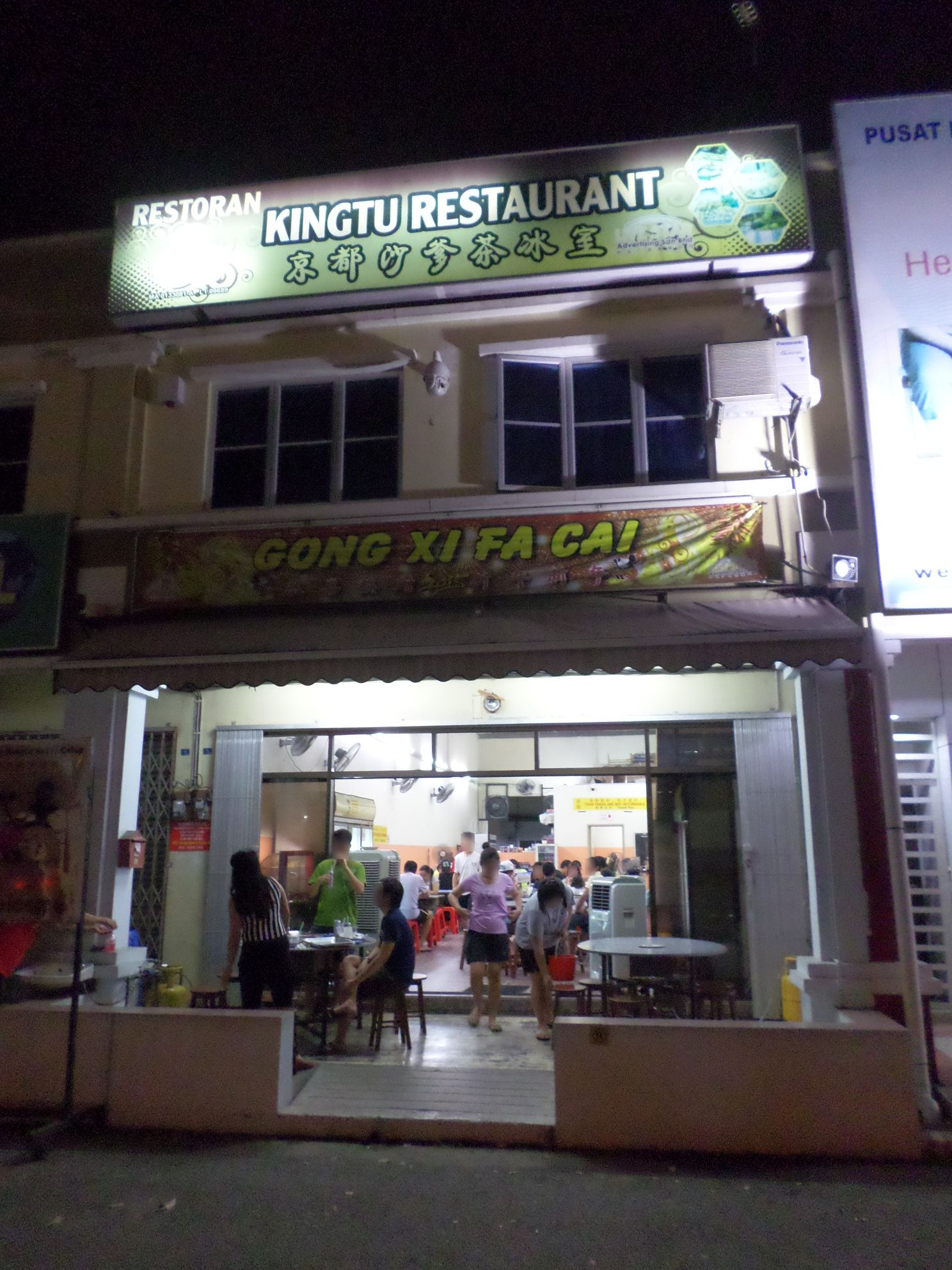
Satay celup restaurant in Melaka, Malaysia.

Satay celup (Steamboat Satay, Chinese: 沙爹朱律) or sate celup is a Malaysian dish where an assortment of raw and semi-cooked seafood, meat (including raw meat) and vegetables on skewers are dunked into a hot boiling pot of satay gravy.

== Origins ==
Satay celup originates from, and is popular in Malacca (historical city of Malaysia). Many tourists and locals consider satay celup a favourite because there are more than 80 types of seafood and vegetables to choose from and the sauces are thick and aromatic. Moreover, the food is always kept fresh in huge refrigerators or on shelves of cold storages in food courts.

== Pricing ==
Satay celup is sold at prices that start as low as 80 cents in Malacca where food is easily obtainable at cheap prices. Barley drinks often accompany the meal due to its hot and spicy flavour, coconut water or Chinese herbs tea will be a good combination.

== Serving ==
Satay celup is sold in a self-service mode, and as soon as seats are picked by customers, food can be immediately taken using trays provided.

For people who are unable to stand the hot flavour, one can easily request for a plain water so it can be dipped into it to wash away the sauce.

== See also ==
- Satay - specialty of Kajang, less than 100 km from Melaka
