= List of equipment of the Malaysian Maritime Enforcement Agency =

The Malaysian Maritime Enforcement Agency uses cutters and small boats on the water, and fixed and rotary wings (helicopters) as well UAVs in the air. The Coast Guard employs various firearms including pistol, shotgun, rifle, and machine gun.

== Ships ==
Class	Image	Origin	Quantity	Notes
Offshore patrol vessels
Multi-Purpose Mission Ship		Turkey	0+(2)	2 on order. 99 meter vessel equipped with 4 fast interceptor crafts and 2 Havelsan BAHA drones.
Tun Fatimah		Netherlands; Malaysia	1+(2)	1 active, 2 under construction. 83 meter offshore patrol vessel built locally by THHE-Destini, Shin Yang. Equipped with ALTI Transition drone. KM Tun Fatimah (8305)
KM Pekan		Japan	1	92 meter offshore patrol vessel transferred from Japan Coast Guard. KM Pekan (9203) (formerly JCG Erimo (PL-02))
KM Arau		Japan	1	87 meter offshore patrol vessel transferred from Japan Coast Guard. KM Arau (8704) (formerly JCG Oki (PL-01))
Langkawi		South Korea; Malaysia	2	75 meter offshore patrol vessel transferred from Royal Malaysian Navy. Built by Korea Tacoma Shipbuilding and Malaysia Shipyard and Engineering. KM Langkawi (7501) (formerly KD Musytari); KM Bangi (7502) (formerly KD Marikh)
Bendahara		United States	1+(1)	65 meter offshore patrol vessel transferred from United States Coast Guard. KM Bendahara (formerly USCGC Steadfast)
Inshore patrol vessels
Bagan Datuk		Germany; Malaysia	6	45 meter patrol vessel based on a design by Germany's Fassmer Shipbuilding Company. Built locally by Destini Berhad. Equipped with Aerovision Fulmar drone. KM Bagan Datuk (4541) KM Sri Aman (4542) KM Kota Belud (4543) KM Tok Bali (4544) KM Kota Kinabalu (4545) KM Lahad Datu (4546)
KM Marlin		Japan	1	40 meter patrol vessel donated by The Nippon Foundation Japan in 2006. KM Marlin also serves as a training ship.
Perwira		Australia	2	38 meter Bay-class patrol vessel transferred from the Australian Customs and Border Protection Service (ACBPS). KM Perwira (3801) (formerly ACV Arnhem Bay) KM Satria (3802) (formerly ACV Dame Roma Mitchell)
Gagah		Malaysia	15	(ex PZ-class patrol vessel, Royal Malaysian Police). Length: 39 meter; Width: 7 meter; Speed: 23 knots; Weight: 230 tonnes; Weapon: 1 Bofors 40 mm / 1 Oerlikon 20 mm / GPMG 7.62 mm; Engine: 2 MTU 20V 538 TB92; Crew: 34 men KM Gagah (3901) KM Tabah (3902) KM Cekal (3903) KM Berani (3904) KM Setia (3905) KM Amanah (3906) KM Jujur (3907) KM Ikhlas (3908) KM Budiman (3909) KM Tegas (3910) KM Mulia (3911) KM Bijak (3912) KM Adil (3913) KM Pintar (3914) KM Bistari (3915)
Ramunia		Malaysia	7	(ex Bahtera-class patrol vessel, Royal Malaysian Custom). Length: 32.4 meter; Width: 7.2 meter; Speed: 20 knots; Weight: 143 tonnes; Weapon: 1 Oerlikon 20 mm / GPMG 7.62 mm; Engine: 2 Paxman Valenta 16 cm Diesel; Crew: 25 men KM Ramunia (3221) KM Marudu (3222) KM Danga (3223) KM Siangin (3224) KM Kimanis (3225) KM Burau (3226) KM Nipah (3227)
Gemia		Malaysia	9	(ex PX-class patrol vessel, Royal Malaysian Police). Length: 29 meter; Weapon: 1 Oerlikon 20 mm / GPMG 7.62 mm KM Gemia (2950) KM Rawa (2951) KM Peringgi (2952) KM Redang (2953) KM Kapas (2954) KM Libaran (2955) KM Mabul (2956) KM Tenggol (2957) KM Sebatik (2958)
Rhu		Malaysia	2	(ex SIRI 200-class patrol vessel, Fisheries Department). Length: 26 meter KM Rhu (2601) KM Stapa (2602)
Malawali		Malaysia	4	(ex Bintang-class patrol vessel, Marine Department). Length: 25 meter KM Malawali (2551) KM Serasan (2552) KM Manjung (2553) KM Tebrau (2554)
Nusa		Malaysia	5	2 x (ex Rajawali-class patrol vessel, Marine Department). Length: 22.4 meter KM Nusa (2201) KM Rentap (2202); 3 x (ex KA-class patrol vessel, Royal Malaysian Custom). Length: 28.8 meter KM Renggis (2203) KM Sugut (2204) KM Balung (2205)
Tugau		Malaysia	14	(ex PA-class patrol vessel, Royal Malaysian Police). Length: 22 meter KM Mukah (2211) destroyed by fire in Kuantan in 2013. KM Tugau (2210) KM Tatau (2212) KM Nyalau (2213) KM Niah (2214) KM Kidurong (2215) KM Jepak (2216) KM Sikuati (2217) KM Tambisan (2218) KM Bagahak (2219) KM Siagut (2220) KM Mengalum (2221) KM Medang (2222) KM Memmon (2223) KM Sibuan (2224)
Semilang		Malaysia	4	(ex SIRI 100-class patrol vessel, Fisheries Department). Length: 21 meter KM Semilang (2161) KM Alu-Alu (2162) KM Mersuji (2163) KM Siakap (2164)
Fast interceptor craft / Rigid-hulled inflatable boat / Jet ski
Penggalang		Malaysia	50	Fast interceptor craft. Speed: 70 knots 10 x Penggalang 20 meter BYO 2 x Penggalang 18 meter DMS 8 x Penggalang 17 meter DMS Icarus Marine 20 x Penggalang 16 meter (ex Custom Perantas-class boat) 10 x Penggalang (ex Police Penyengat-class boat)
Pengawal		Malaysia	45	(ex PC-class boat, Royal Malaysian Police and ex GRP-class boat, Marine Department). 45 in inventory. 27 x Pengawal 14.8 meter 7 x Pengawal 13.6 meter 11 x Pengawal 13.5 meter
Penyelamat		Malaysia	10	Search and Rescue (SAR) operations and emergency assistance boat. Penyelamat 20 meter Penyelamat 13 meter
Halilintar		Malaysia	9	12.5 meter fast interceptor craft.
Petir		Malaysia	12	Fast interceptor craft. 6 x Petir Open Type 12 meter 6 x Petir RHFB 12 meter
Perkasa		Malaysia	30	12 meter rigid-hulled fender boat.
Peninjau		Malaysia	1	(ex-SIRI 300-class boat, Fisheries Department). Peninjau 17 meter
Adal		Malaysia	6	12.5 meter boat.
Cenderawasih		Malaysia	5	11.51 meter boat.
Pengaman		Malaysia	1	(ex AL-class boat, Marine Department). 9.2 meter Search and Rescue (SAR) operations and emergency assistance boat.
Pelindung		Malaysia	5	(ex OBM-class boat, Fisheries Department). Pelindung 6.4 meter
Benteng		Malaysia	8	12 meter boat based on P38 and P9 design made by UES LLC.
Ibrahim IC 1170		Malaysia	1	12.6 meter rigid-hulled inflatable boat.
Banggi		Malaysia	18	11 meter boat.
Kilat		Malaysia	40	7.62 meter rigid-hulled inflatable boat.
Seahawk		Malaysia	4	6.36 meter boat.
Air boat		Malaysia	3	5.4 meter boat.
Rigid hull inflatable boat		Malaysia	unknown	
GTX LTD 300 jet ski		Malaysia	6	
GTS jet ski		Malaysia	4	

== Aircraft ==
Aircraft	Image	Variant	Origin	Quantity	Notes
Fixed wings
Bombardier 415		CL-415MP	Canada	1	Water bomber, amphibious maritime patrol & search and rescue aircraft. Used for aerial firefighting, maritime patrol & search and rescue. M71-02 retired in 2025. M71-01
Helicopters
Eurocopter Dauphin		AS365 N3	France	3	Multi-purpose helicopter. Used for search and rescue (SAR), coastal patrol and law enforcement duties. M70-01 M70-02 M70-03
AgustaWestland AW139		AW139	Italy	2	Multi-purpose helicopter. Used for search and rescue (SAR), coastal patrol and law enforcement duties. M72-01 crashed in 2024. M72-02 M72-03
AgustaWestland AW149		AW149	Italy	0+(4)	4 on order.
AgustaWestland AW189		AW189	Italy	1+(3)	Multi-purpose helicopter. Used for search and rescue (SAR), coastal patrol and law enforcement duties. 1 delivered, 3 on order. M73-01
Unmanned aerial vehicles
Havelsan BAHA			Turkey	2	Installed on the Multi-Purpose Mission Ship.
ALTI Transition			South Africa	3	Installed on the Tun Fatimah-class offshore patrol vessel.
Aerovision Fulmar			Spain	6	Installed on the Bagan Datuk-class patrol vessel.

== Firearms ==
Firearm	Image	Type	Calibre	Origin	Details
Pistols
Glock 19		Pistol	9×19mm Parabellum	Austria	Standard service pistol.
Heckler & Koch VP9		Pistol	9×19mm Parabellum	Germany	SFP9. Used by STAR.
CZ P-07		Pistol	9×19mm Parabellum	Czech Republic	
Shotguns
Remington 870		Pump-action shotgun	12-gauge	United States	Used as a breaching shotgun.
Submachine guns
MP5		Submachine gun	9×19mm Parabellum	Germany; Turkey	Manufactured under licence by MKEK. Used in night operations, patrolling, close quarters (especially VBSS/GOPLATS), hostage rescue and escort.
UMP		Submachine gun	9×19mm Parabellum	Germany	UMP9. Used by all branches of MMEA.
CZ Scorpion Evo 3		Submachine gun	9×19mm Parabellum	Czech Republic	Used by STAR.
Assault rifles
HK 416		Assault rifle	5.56×45mm NATO	Germany	HK416A5. Used by STAR.
M16		Assault rifle	5.56×45mm NATO	United States	M16A1. Used by all branches of MMEA.
Adcor A-556		Assault rifle	5.56×45mm NATO	United States	Used by STAR.
Colt CM901		Battle rifle	7.62×51mm NATO	United States	CM901. Used by STAR.
SIG 553		Carbine	5.56×45mm NATO	Switzerland	SG 553SB. Used by STAR.
Sniper rifles
R93		Sniper rifle	.308 Winchester	Germany	Used by STAR.
Accuracy International Arctic Warfare		Sniper rifle	5.56×45mm NATO	United Kingdom	Precision marksman. Used by STAR.
Machine guns
MG5		General purpose machine gun	7.62×51mm NATO	Germany	Belt-fed. Used by STAR.
SS-77		General purpose machine gun	7.62×51mm NATO	South Africa	Belt-fed. Used by STAR.
Grenade-based weapons
GL 5040		Grenade launcher	40×46mm SR	Switzerland	Single-shot underbarrel grenade launcher. Used by STAR.
HE grenade					Used by STAR.
Stun grenade					Used by STAR.
Smoke grenade					Used by STAR.

== Historical equipment ==
=== Ships ===
- Sipadan

32 meter ship built by United Kingdom. A total of 16 ships were transferred from Royal Malaysian Navy. All retired from MMEA's service. Some of the ships were sunk as artificial reefs.

- PX Wooden Hull

A total of 9 PX Wooden Hull of Royal Malaysia Police transferred to MMEA. All retired from MMEA's service. Some of the ships were sunk as artificial reefs.

== Procurement ==
Modernisation program	Class	Origin	Type	Quantity	Notes
Offshore patrol vessels
Multi-Purpose Mission Ship Program	Multi-Purpose Mission Ship	Turkey	Multi-purpose mission ship	2 under construction	
New Generation Offshore Patrol Vessel Program	Tun Fatimah	Netherlands; Malaysia	Offshore patrol vessel	1 completed, 2 under construction	Three OPV based on Damen 1800-class offshore patrol vessel ordered by Malaysia in 2017 to boost up patrol capabilities.
Interim Offshore Patrol Vessel Program	Bendahara	United States	Offshore patrol vessel	1 delivered, 1 on order	Transferred from United States Coast Guard.
Inshore patrol vessels
New Generation Patrol Vessel / New Generation Patrol Craft Program			Inshore patrol vessel	2 approved	Two 40+ meter vessels planned. Tender launched in October 2025.
Fixed wings
Maritime Surveillance Aircraft Program			Maritime surveillance aircraft	1 approved	
Helicopters
Utility / Patrol Helicopter Program	AgustaWestland AW189	Italy	Utility helicopter	4 on order	In February 2020, The Home Ministry has approved the procurement of four helicopters worth RM600 million for the Malaysian Maritime Enforcement Agency (MMEA). In January 2024, the Home Ministry has chosen AgustaWestland AW189 from Italy as the new helicopter for MMEA.

== See also ==
- List of equipment of the Malaysian Army
- List of equipment of the Royal Malaysian Navy
- List of equipment of the Royal Malaysian Air Force
- List of aircraft of the Malaysian Armed Forces
- List of vehicles of the Royal Malaysian Police
- List of police firearms in Malaysia
