= List of police firearms in Malaysia =

Within the Royal Malaysia Police, officers and personnel are routinely armed. Special police officers are usually trained to a higher standard than regular personnel, because they are likely to be the officers required to enter besieged premises. The vast majority of firearms used by the Royal Malaysia Police are semi-automatic and fully automatic.

== Use order ==
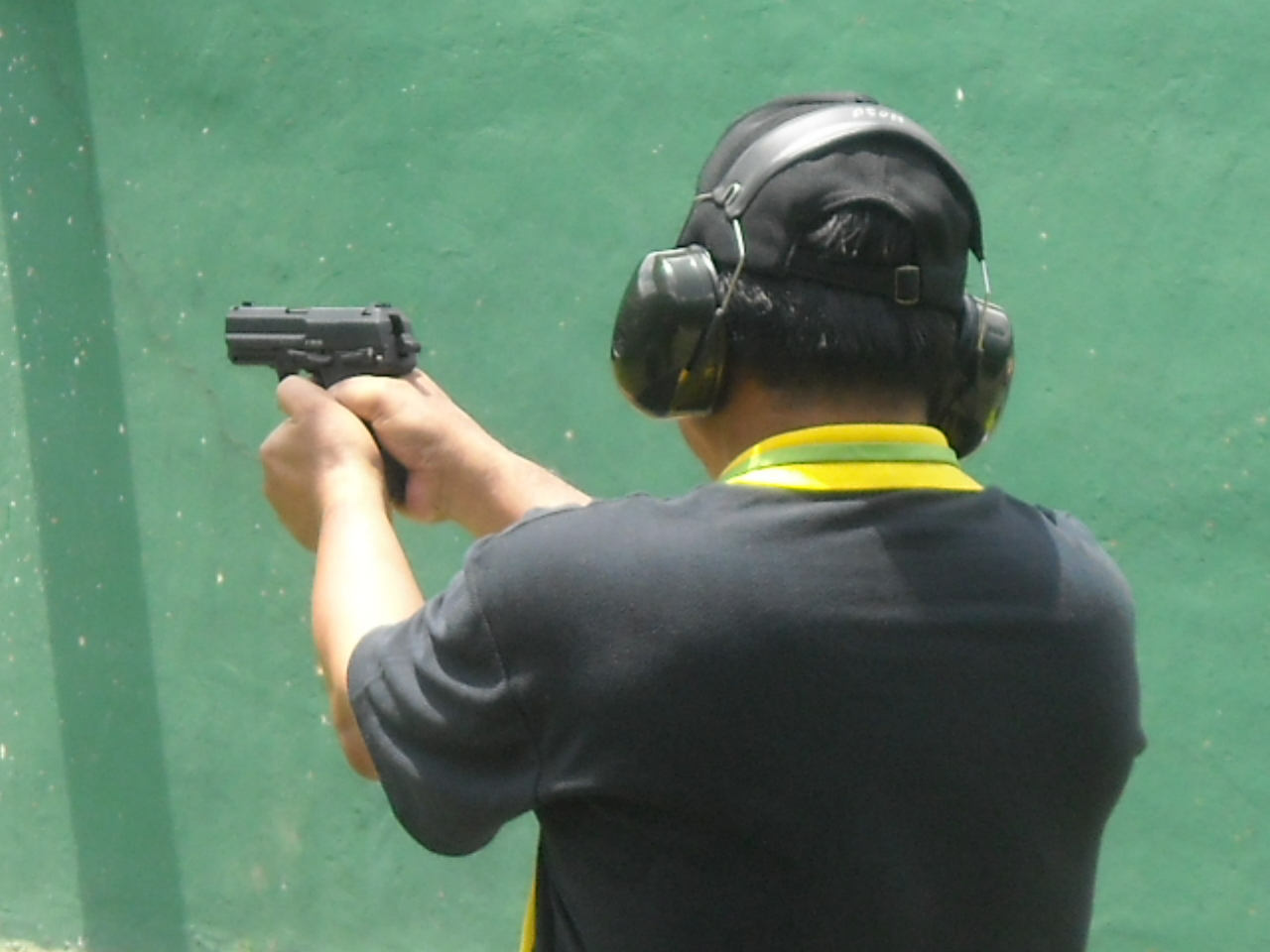
The 9mm HK USP Compact, used by RMP personnel

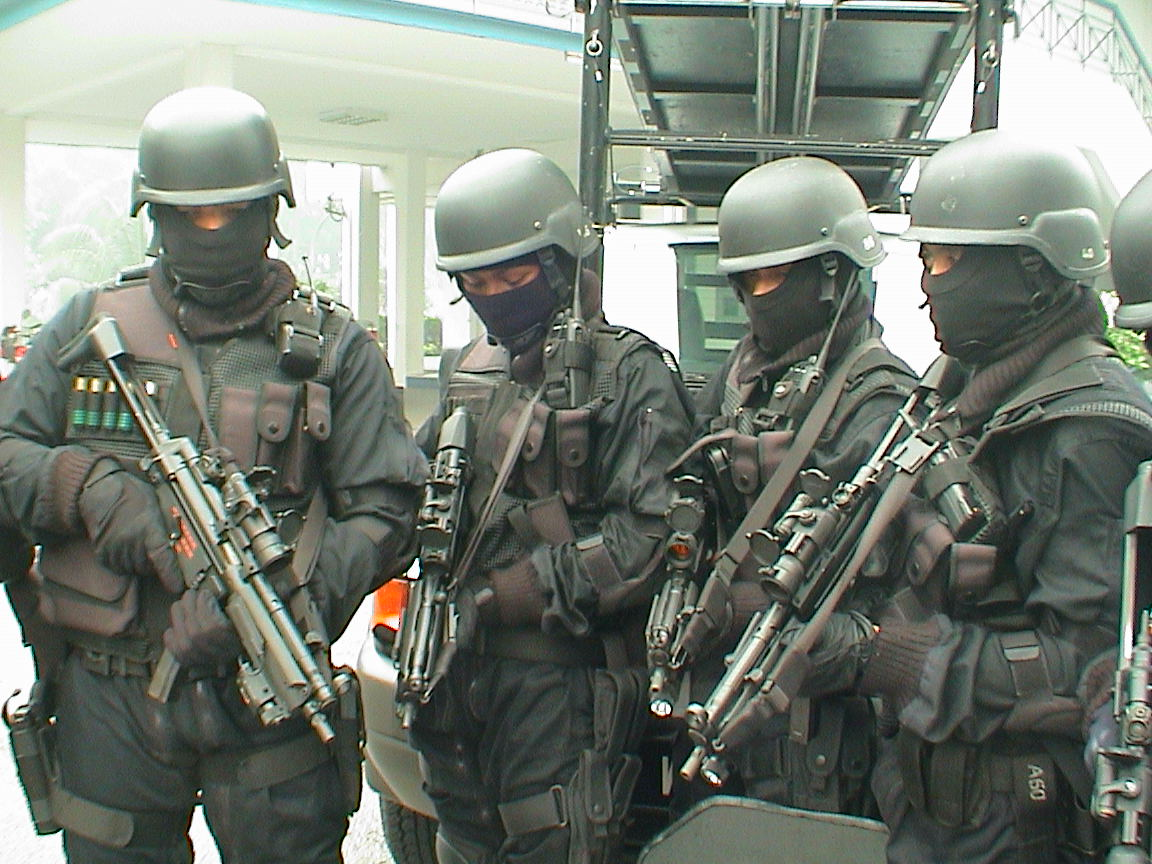
Four Special Action Unit (UTK) operatives on standby. They are armed with MP5A5 equipped with Aimpoint CompM2 Sight and Insight Technology flashlight.

Following an Inspector-General of Police Firm Order D222, firearms use was deemed as needed. For example, using firearms to dismiss an illegal assembly or riot as shown in the Public Security manual. Use of firearms may be needed to repel an attack on top police station or police observation posts. Also, firearms could be used when an officer and/or members may be killed or hurt or weapons seized/station or property captured or destroyed. Additionally, prisoner escape could warrant such use. Police officers can use the firearm during roadblock duty or Narcotics Department operations, Criminal Investigation Department, Traffic Police and all branches that are carrying out duties where policeman life or public property is in jeopardy.

== Weapons ==
Firearms in service vary between police forces in Malaysia, due to individual Constables and Police Authorities dictating the number of firearms officers and police firearms available to each force. Despite being armed, police constables still carry the standard issue T-batons, pepper spray and Hiatts Speedcuffs as well as the Walther P99 standard-issue sidearm. In some circumstances, special firearms can be authorised for use in police special operations and counter-terrorism unit.

Model	Image	Type	Calibre	Origin	Version	Details
Pistols
Hi Power		Semi-automatic pistol	9×19mm Parabellum	Belgium	MKIII	Limited service.
M92		Semi-automatic pistol	9×19mm Parabellum	Italy	92FS	Used by specific units.
PX4 Storm		Semi-automatic pistol	9×19mm Parabellum	Italy	PX4 Storm	Standard issue sidearms.
Tanfoglio Force		Semi-automatic pistol	9×19mm Parabellum	Italy		Standard issue sidearms.
Glock		Semi-automatic pistol	9×19mm Parabellum	Austria	Glock 17 Glock 18 Glock 19 Glock 34	Standard issue sidearms. Also used by Special Action Unit (UTK) and 69 Commando of PGK.
Steyr M		Semi-automatic pistol	9×19mm Parabellum	Austria	M9A1	Standard issue sidearms.
SIG P226		Semi-automatic pistol	9×19mm Parabellum	Switzerland	P226	Standard issue sidearms.
SIG Pro		Semi-automatic pistol	9×19mm Parabellum	Switzerland	SP2022 SPC2022	Standard issue sidearms.
SP1		Semi-automatic pistol	9×19mm Parabellum	South Africa	SP1	Standard issue sidearms.
Yavuz 16		Semi-automatic pistol	9×19mm Parabellum	Turkey	Yavuz 16	Standard issue sidearms.
CZ P-07		Semi-automatic pistol	9×19mm Parabellum	Czech Republic		Standard issue sidearms.
CZ P-10 C		Semi-automatic pistol	9×19mm Parabellum	Czech Republic		Standard issue sidearms.
P99		Semi-automatic pistol	9×19mm Parabellum	Germany	P99AS	Standard issue sidearms.
Heckler & Koch USP		Semi-automatic pistol	9×19mm Parabellum	Germany	USP9 Compact	In use with police divisions in the states of Sabah and Sarawak.
Tara TM-9		Semi-automatic pistol	9×19mm Parabellum	Montenegro		Standard issue sidearms.
USP		Semi-automatic pistol	9×19mm Parabellum	Germany	USP9 Tactical	Used by Special Action Unit (UTK) and 69 Commando of PGK.
Mark 23		Semi-automatic pistol	.45 ACP	Germany	Mk23 Mod 0	Used by Special Action Unit (UTK) of PGK.
M1911		Semi-automatic pistol	.45 ACP	USA	M1911A1	Used by 69 Commando of PGK.
Shotguns
HK512		Shotgun	12-gauge	Germany	HK512	Standard issue shotguns. Equipped with pistol grip. Also used by UNGERIN.
Auto-5		Shotgun	12-gauge	USA	Auto-5	Standard issue shotguns.
M870		Shotgun	12-gauge	USA	M870	Standard issue shotguns. Equipped with pistol grip. Used for door breaching and close quarters combat.
M1100		Shotgun	12-gauge	USA	M1100	Standard issue shotguns.
M1912		Shotgun	12-gauge	USA	M1912	Standard issue shotguns.
SPAS-15		Shotgun	12-gauge	Italy	SPAS-15	In limited use with the Bank Simpanan Nasional auxiliary police.
SPAS-12		Shotgun	12-gauge	Italy	SPAS-12	Combat shotguns.
M3		Shotgun	12 gauge	Italy	M3 Super 90	Breaching and combat shotguns. Used by 69 Commando and Special Action Unit (UTK) of PGK.
Submachine guns
Evo 3		Submachine gun	9×19mm Parabellum	Czech Republic	Evo 3	Standard issue submachine guns.
UMP		Submachine gun	9×19mm Parabellum	Germany	UMP9	Standard issue submachine guns.
MP5		Submachine gun	9×19mm Parabellum	Germany	MP5A2 MP5A3 MP5K MP5A5 MP5K-A5 MP5N MP5SD6	Standard issue submachine gun. Both (except MP5K-A4) equipped with HK Tactical Flashlight Handguards (Guarder versions), Surefire Tactical Flashlight, infrared laser, Aimpoint CompM2 optical sight and EOTech holographic sight.
MP7		Submachine gun	4.6×30mm	Germany	MP7 MP7A1	Used by 69 Commando and Special Action Unit (UTK) of PGK.
Assault rifles
SOAR		Carbine	5.56×45mm NATO	USA; Philippines	SOAR	Used by Special Actions Unit (UTK) of PGK.
Carbon 15		Carbine	5.56×45mm NATO	USA	Carbon 15 SBR	Standard service carbines.
M4		Carbine	5.56×45mm NATO	USA	M4A1 APC	Used by all branches of General Operations Force (GOF) and UNGERIN. M4 APC used by 69 Commando of PGK.
M16		Assault rifle	5.56×45mm NATO	USA	M16A1 M16A2	Standard M16A1 service rifles, equipped with 20-round and 30-round magazines. M16A2 assault rifle used by GOF.
HK 33		Assault rifle	5.56×45mm NATO	Germany	HK33A2 HK53	Limited service. In service with the Malaysia Airports auxiliary police.
HK416		Assault rifle	5.56×45mm NATO	Germany	D10RS D14.5RS	Used by Special Action Unit (UTK) and 69 Commando of PGK.
AUG		Assault rifle	5.56×45mm NATO	Austria	AUG-A1 AUG-A3	Used by 69 Commando of PGK.
CM901		Battle rifle	7.62×51mm NATO	USA	CM901	Used by all branches of Marine Operations Force at Sabah States.
SCAR		Battle rifle	7.62×51mm NATO	Belgium	SCAR-H	Used by 69 Commando, Special Action Unit (UTK) and UNGERIN.
Sharpshooter rifles
G3		Sharpshooter rifle	7.62×51mm NATO	Germany	G3/SG-1	Fully/semi-automatic rifle used by GOF and Federal Reserve Unit (FRU).
PSG-1		Sharpshooter rifle	7.62×51mm NATO	Germany	PSG-1A1	Used by Special Actions Unit (UTK) of PGK and UNGERIN.
Sniper rifles
AW		Sniper rifle	.308 Winchester	UK	PM AXMC	Used by Special Action Unit (UTK) and 69 Commando of PGK and UNGERIN.
AWM		Sniper rifle	.338 Lapua Magnum	UK	AWSM	Used by Special Actions Unit (UTK) of PGK.
M700		Sniper rifle	5.56×45mm NATO; 7.62×51mm NATO	USA	M700	Used by Special Action Unit (UTK) and 69 Commando of PGK.
M32		Anti-materiel rifle	12.7×99mm NATO	USA	M82A1	Used by Special Action Unit (UTK) and 69 Commando of PGK.
Machineguns
HK21		Light machinegun	7.62×51mm NATO	Germany	HK11A1	Standard general purpose machine gun. Magazine-fed.
M240		General purpose machine gun	7.62×51mm NATO	USA	OOW240P	Used by General Operation Force (GOF), OOW240P Variant from Ohio Ordnance Works.
MAG		General purpose machine gun	7.62×51mm NATO	Belgium	MAG	Standard general purpose machine gun.
M60		General purpose machine gun	7.62×51mm NATO	USA	M60E1	Standard general purpose machine gun. Used by 69 Commando of PGK.
M2		Heavy machinegun	12.7×99mm NATO	USA	M2A1 M2HB	Mounted on vehicles and vessels.
Grenade-based weapons
Riot Gun		Grenade launcher	37mm	USA	Riot Gun	Standard issue grenade launcher. Used by the Federal Reserve Unit (FRU), Light Strike Force (LSF) and Public Order Reserve Unit (PORU).
HK69		Grenade launcher	40mm	Germany	HK69A1	Standard issue grenade launcher.
M79		Grenade launcher	40mm	USA	M79	Standard issue grenade launcher.
M203		Grenade launcher	40 mm grenade	USA	M203 M203A1	Single-shot underbarrel grenade launcher. Attached to M4/M4A1 (M203A1) and M16A1 (M203).
HE grenade		Fragmentation grenade		USA		
M18		Smoke grenade		USA		
M84		Stun grenade		USA		
Anti-armor weapons
RPG-7		Rocket-propelled grenade	40mm HEAT	USSR; Bulgaria	ATGL-5	Used by GOF, Special Action Unit (UTK) and 69 Commando.
Less-lethal weapons
X26		Less-lethal weapon		USA	X26 E	Standard issue less-lethal weapon.

== Heavy weapons ==
The General Operations Force (GOF) and Marine Operations Force use a range of heavier weapons up to automatic cannon of 20mm calibre deployed on the armoured personnel carrier and patrol vessel.

Model	Image	Type	Calibre	Origin	Details
Autocannon
Oerlikon cannon		Autocannon	20mm	Switzerland	Mounted on armoured personnel carrier and patrol vessel.

== Former weapons ==
Model	Image	Origin	Calibre	Version	Details
Pistols
M1911 pistol		USA	.45 ACP	M1911A1	In use with senior police officers.
Webley Revolver		UK	.38-200	Standard	Phased out in year 1974, replaced by the Smith & Wesson Model 15 and Smith & Wesson Model 36 service revolvers.
Enfield No. 2		UK	.38-200	Standard	Phased out in the year 1974, replaced by the Smith & Wesson Model 15 and Model 36 service revolvers.
Model 15		USA	.38 Special	Model 15	Retired and replaced by the Walther P99.
Model 36		USA	.38 Special	Model 36	Retired and replaced with the Walther P99, in use with some traffic officers.
Shotguns
M1897		USA	12-gauge	Standard	In use with General Duty and Police Field Force.
Submachine guns
Sten		UK	9mm Parabellum	Mk II Mk V	
Sterling		UK	9mm Parabellum	L2A3	Phased out in year 1982, replaced by the Heckler & Koch MP5 submachine guns.
Assault rifles
AR-15		USA	.223 Remington; 5.56×45mm NATO	AR-15	Received on September 30, 1959.
AR-18		USA	5.56×45mm NATO	AR-18	Used by 69 Commando during Communist insurgency war.
Lee–Enfield		UK	.303 British	No.1 Mk III* No.4 Mk IV	In use as police service rifle.
Mk.V		UK	.303 British	Jungle Carbine	In use with Police Field Force.
M1		USA	.30 Carbine	M1 M1A1 M2	In use with Police Field Force and General Duty senior officer.
L1A1 SLR		Belgium; UK	7.62×51mm NATO	L1A1 L2A1	In use as service rifle and retired in Mid 90s.
AR-70		Italy	5.56×45mm NATO	AR70	In use as service rifle along with HK33 and G41.
HK33		West Germany	5.56×45mm NATO	HK33A2 HK33A3	Phased out in year 1978 due to suffering the stoppages, replaced by an M16A1 rifles.
G41		West Germany	5.56×45mm NATO		
Machine guns
M1941		USA	.303 British	Standard	Formerly used by the Royal Malaysian Police, now on display at the Police Museum.
Bren		UK	.30-06 Springfield	Mk. III	In use as service light machine gun.
Lewis		UK	.303 British	Standard	In use as police station's defence.
Vickers		UK	.303 British	Standard	In use as police station's defence.
Grenade-based weapons
Mills bomb		UK		No. 36 Mk. 1	Used by the Police Field Force.
Mortars
Ordnance SBML 2-inch		UK	50.8 mm	Standard	Used by the Police Field Force.
Ordnance ML 3 inch		UK	81.2mm	Standard	Used by the Police Field Force.

== See also ==
- List of equipment of the Malaysian Army
- List of equipment of the Royal Malaysian Navy
- List of equipment of the Royal Malaysian Air Force
- List of aircraft of the Malaysian Armed Forces
- List of equipment of the Malaysian Maritime Enforcement Agency
- List of vehicles of the Royal Malaysian Police
