= List of equipment of the Royal Malaysian Air Force =

The equipment of the Royal Malaysian Air Force can be subdivided into: aircraft, munition, tactical decoy, pod, radar, air defence and firearm.

== Aircraft ==
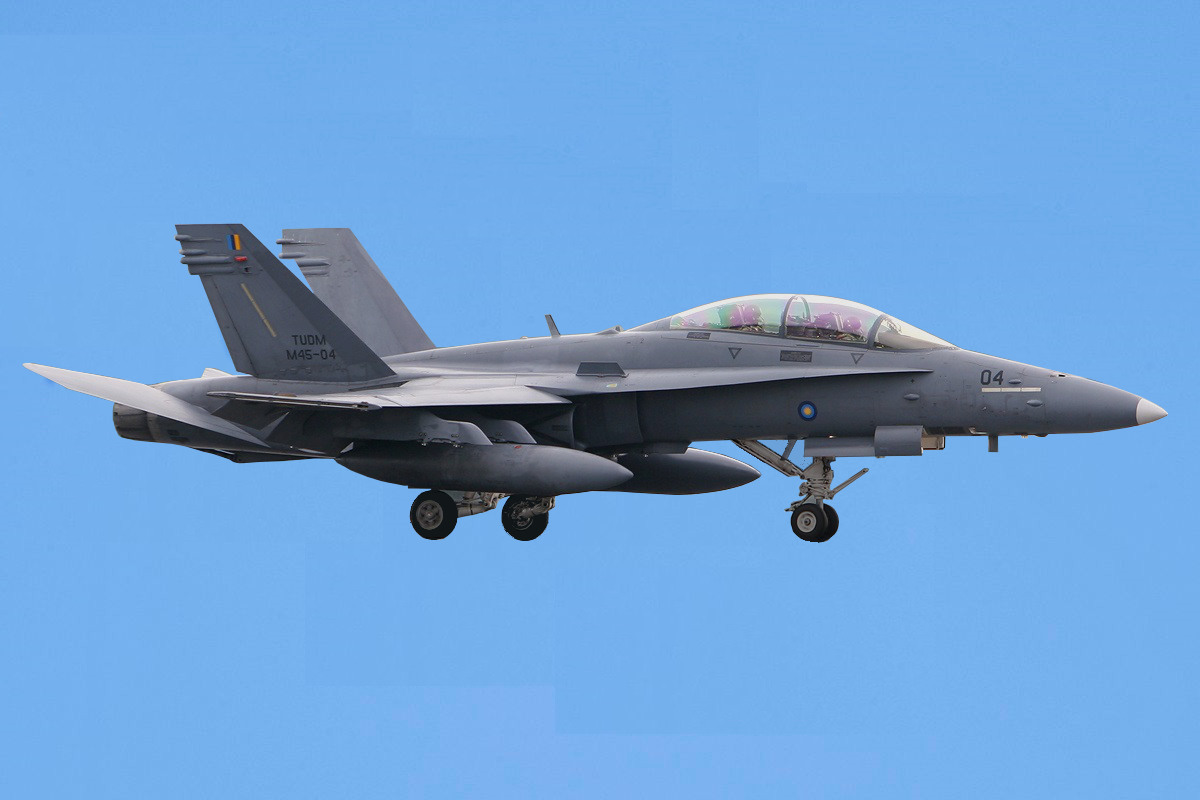
A Malaysian F/A-18D

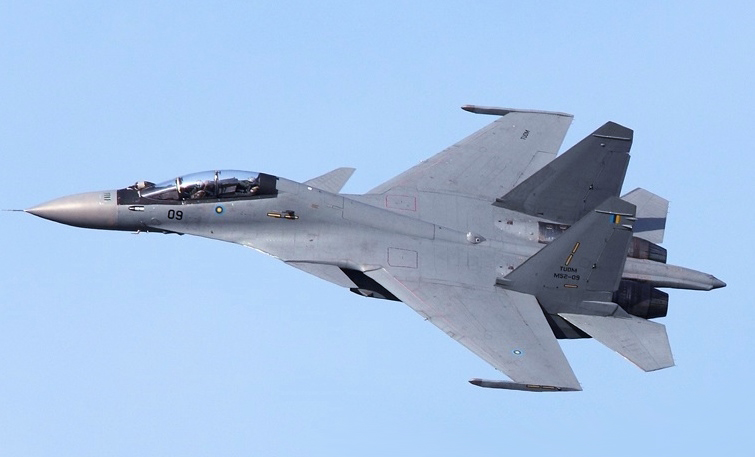
A Malaysian Su-30MKM

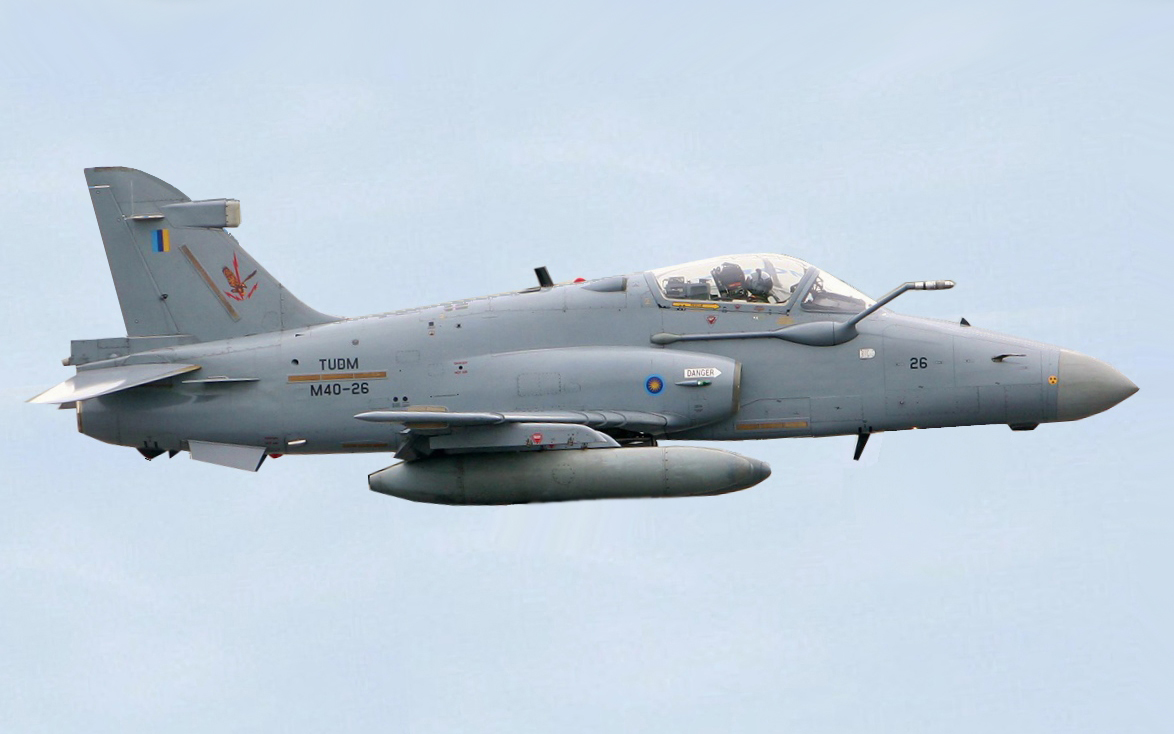
A Malaysian Hawk 208

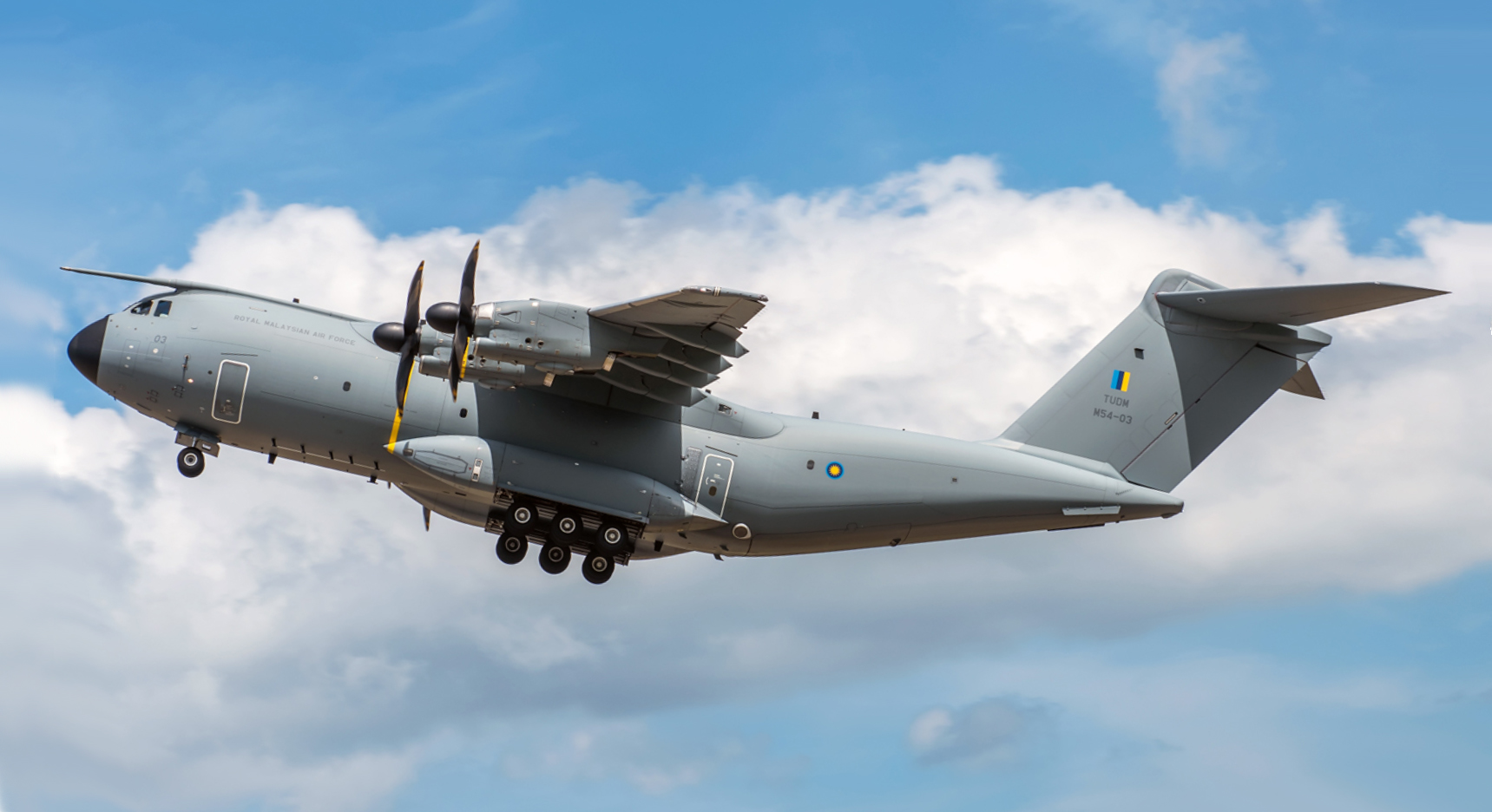
A Malaysian Airbus A400M

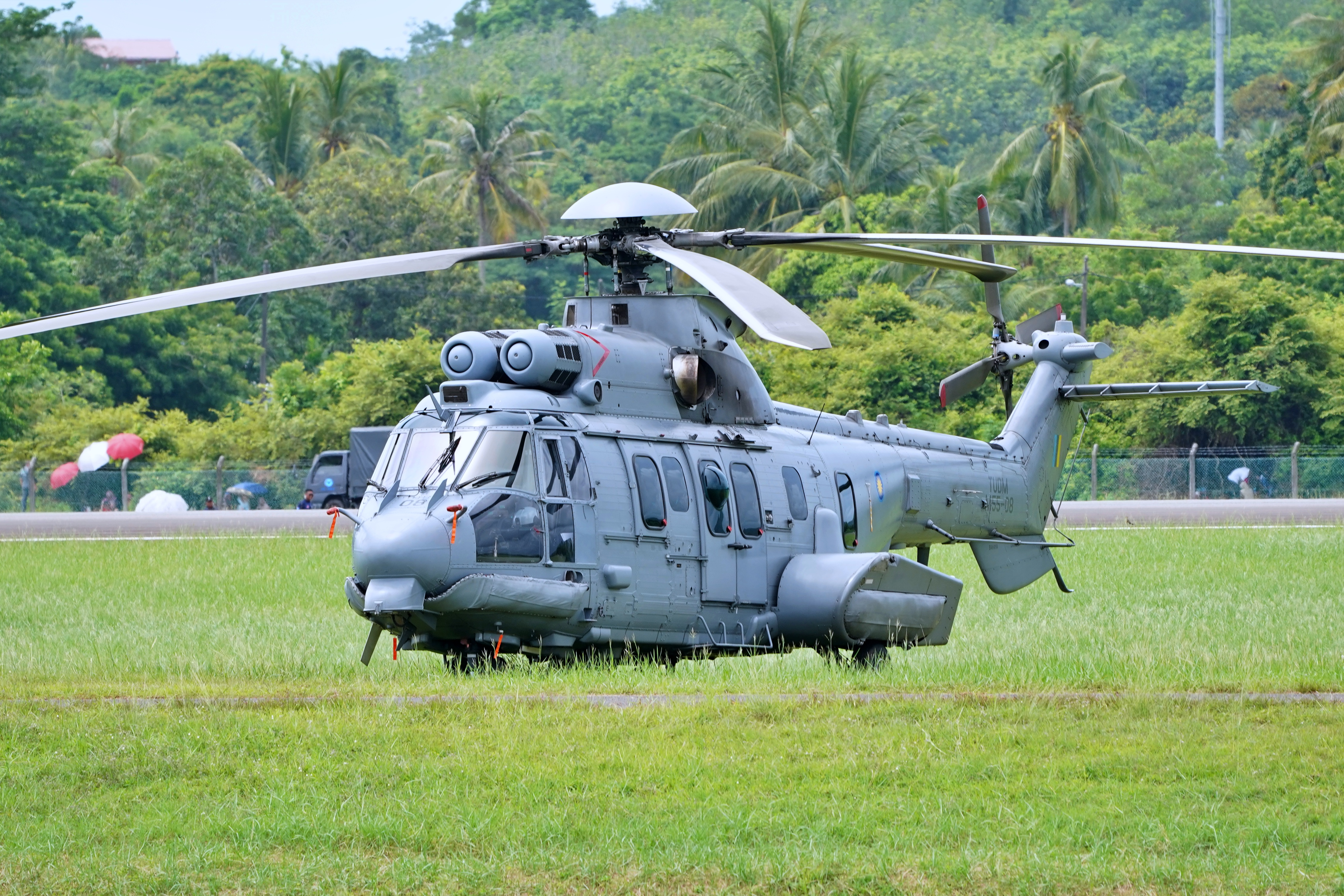
A Malaysian EC725

Aircraft	Origin	Type	Variant	In service	Notes
Combat aircraft
Boeing F/A-18 Hornet	United States	multirole	F/A-18D	7	M45-07 crashed at Kuantan on 21st August 2025
Sukhoi Su-30	Russia	multirole	Su-30MKM	18	
KAI T-50 Golden Eagle	South Korea	light multirole	FA-50M	2+(16)	2 delivered, 16 on order
BAE Hawk 200	United Kingdom	light multirole	Hawk 208	12	
Maritime patrol
ATR 72	France / Italy	maritime patrol	ATR 72MP	0	2 on order
CN-235	Spain / Indonesia	maritime patrol	CN-235-220MSA	3	
Beechcraft Super King Air	United States	maritime patrol	Model 200	2	
Tanker
KC-130 Hercules	United States	aerial refueling / transport	KC-130T	4	
Transport
Airbus A319	Germany	VIP transport	A319CJ	1	
Airbus A320	Germany	VIP transport	A320-214CJ Prestige	1	
Bombardier Global Express	Canada	VIP transport	BD-700	1	
Airbus A400M Atlas	Europe	transport	A400M-180	4	
C-130 Hercules	United States	transport	C-130H	10	(Note: A total of 10 C-130 transport configuration in service. World Air Forces 2025 stated that 1 C-130 in MPA section and 9 C-130 in transport section (total of 10) which is outdated information as RMAF has no more C-130 in MPA configuration as per new MPA aircraft ordered and delivered.)
CN-235	Spain / Indonesia	transport	CN-235-220	4	(Note: A total of 4 CN-235 in service. 3 in transport configuration and 1 in VIP configuration. World Air Forces 2025 just stated 3 transport configuration in service because it doesn't count the one that in VIP role.)
Helicopters
Sikorsky UH-60 Black Hawk	United States	VIP transport / utility	S-70A-34	2	(Note: A total of 2 UH-60 in service. World Air Forces 2025 stated that 4 in service which is outdated information as the additional used UH-60 procurement from Brunei was cancelled.)
Leonardo AW139	Italy	SAR / utility		8	
Leonardo AW149	Italy	SAR / utility		0	12 on order
Eurocopter EC725 Caracal	France	SAR / utility		12+(4)	4 on order
Trainer aircraft
BAE Hawk 100	United Kingdom	jet trainer	Hawk 108	4	
Beechcraft Super King Air	United States	multi engine trainer	Model 350	2	
Pilatus PC-7	Switzerland	light trainer	PC-7 Mk II	20	
Airbus Helicopters H120	France	rotorcraft trainer		5	
Unmanned aerial vehicle
TAI Anka	Turkey	surveillance / UCAV	Anka-S	3	

== Munition ==
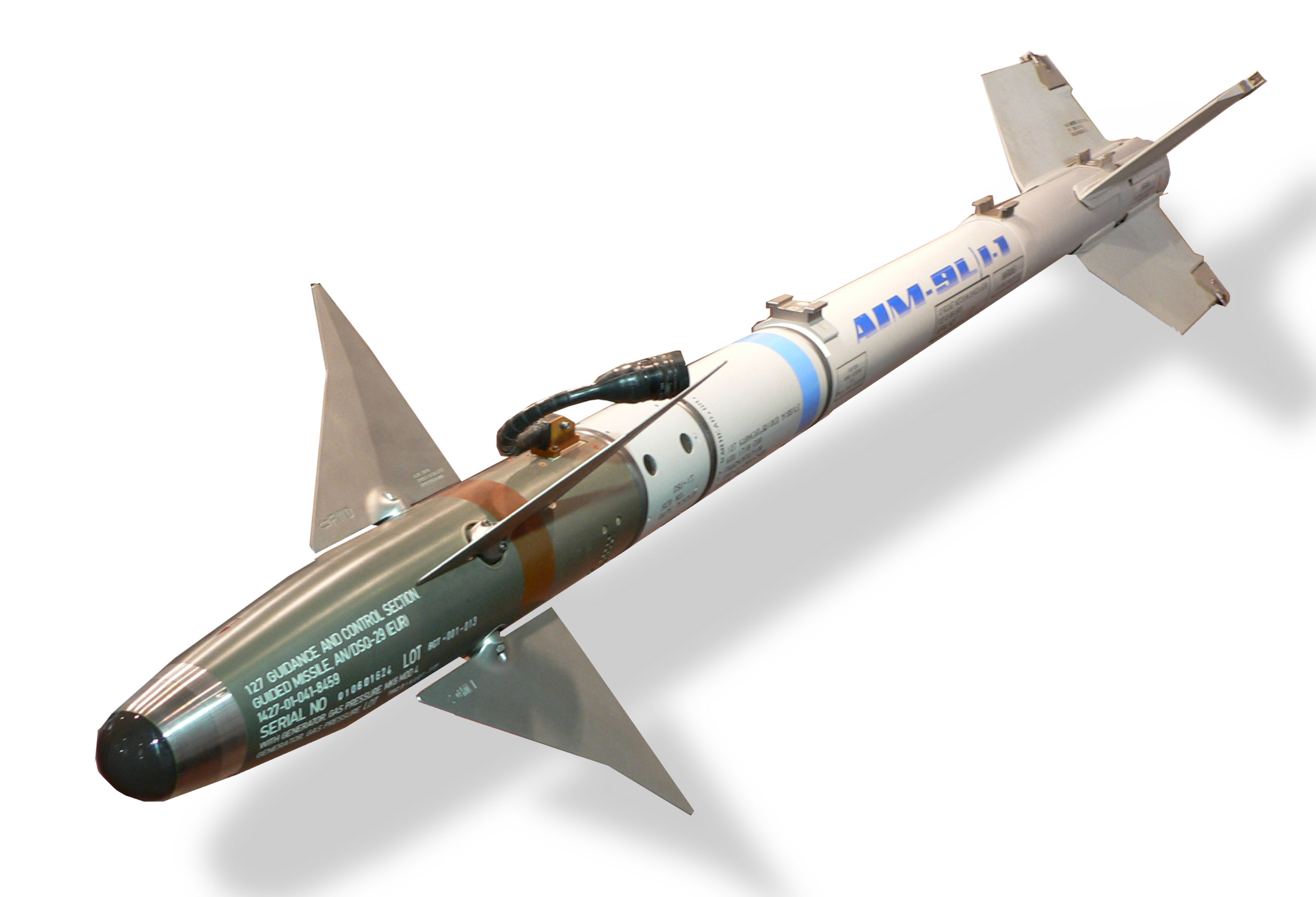
AIM-9 Sidewinder missile

Paveway laser guided bomb

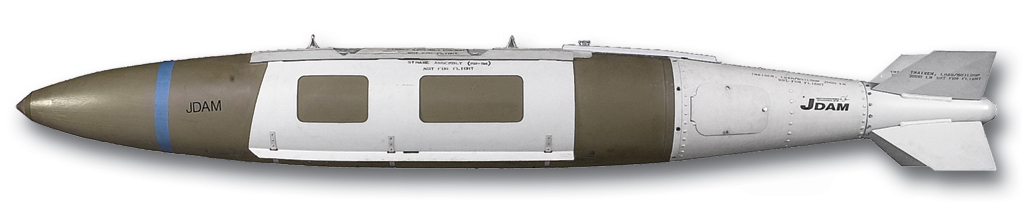
JDAM precision guided munition

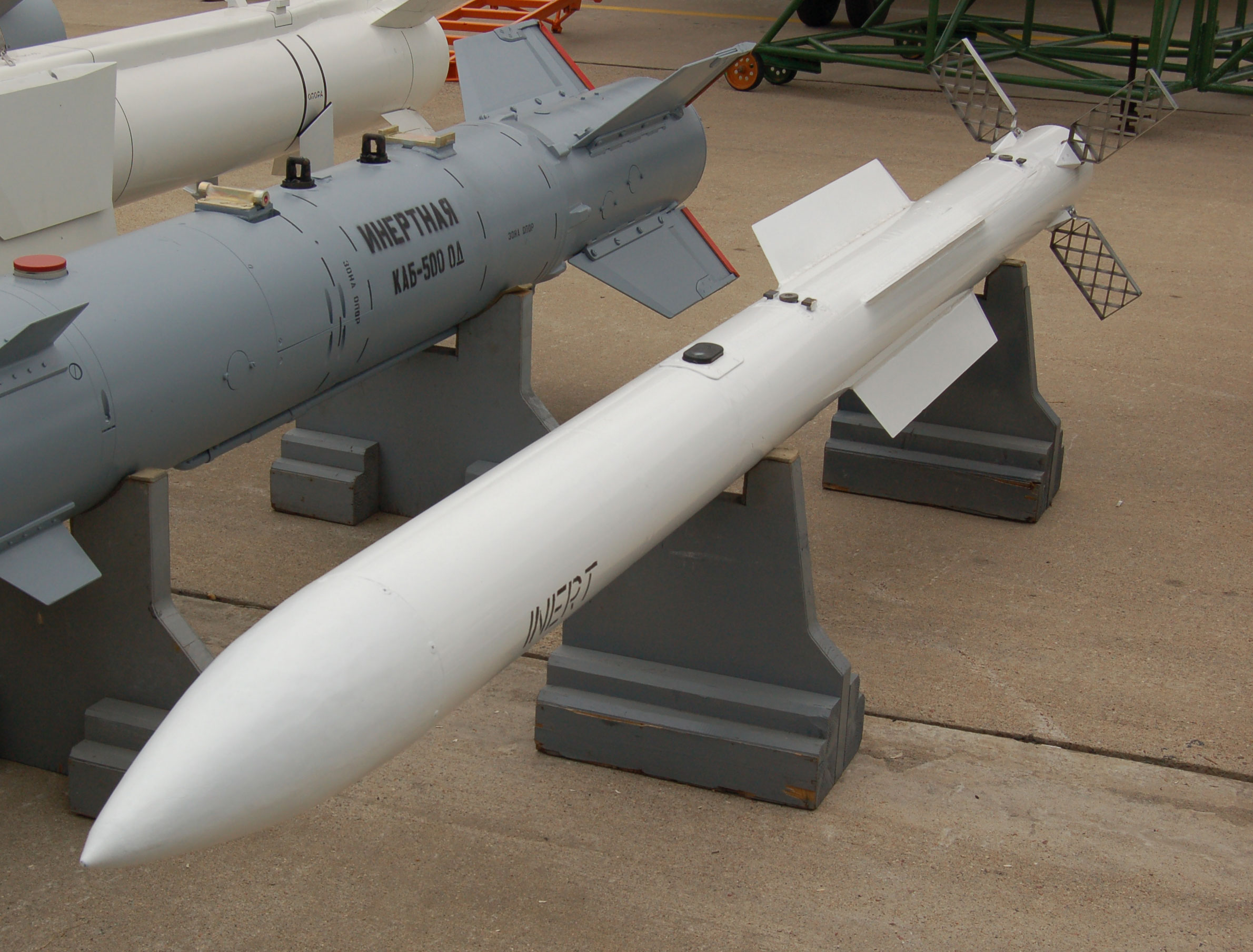
R-77 air to air missile

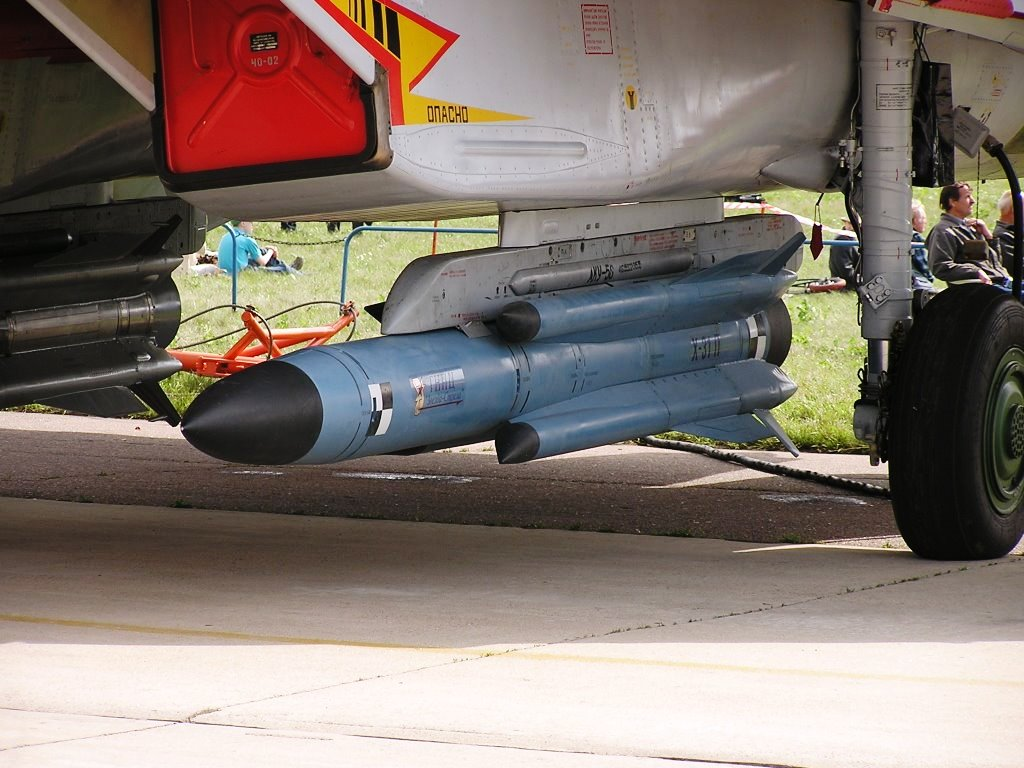
Kh-31 air to surface missile

Munition	Origin	Type	In service	Notes
Air-to-air missile
AIM-7 Sparrow	United States	Semi active radar homing missile	50	
AIM-9 Sidewinder	United States	Infrared homing missile	210	20 are the AIM-9X
AIM-120 AMRAAM	United States	Beyond visual range missile	30	
R-27	Russia	Beyond visual range missile	280	
R-73	Russia	Infrared homing missile	500	
R-77	Russia	Active radar homing missile	150	
Air-to-surface missile
AGM-65 Maverick	United States	Air to surface missile	30	
FZ 90 FFAR	France	Unguided rocket		
Kh-29	Russia	Air to surface missile		
Kh-31P	Russia	Anti radiation missile	150	
Kh-59	Russia	Air to surface missile		
General-purpose bomb
JDAM	United States	Precision guided bomb	50	
Paveway	United States	Laser guided bomb	60	
Mark 82	United States	General purpose bomb		
KAB-500L	Russia	Laser guided bomb		
KAB-1500L	Russia	Laser guided bomb		
FAB-500	Russia	General purpose bomb		
OFAB-100-120	Russia	General purpose bomb		
OFAB 250-270	Russia	General purpose bomb		
Anti-ship missile
AGM-84 Harpoon	United States	Anti surface missile	30	
Kh-31A	Russia	Anti surface missile	150	

== Tactical decoy ==
Tactical decoy	Origin	Type	In service	Notes
Tactical decoy
ADM-141 TALD	United States	Decoy missile		Used by F/A-18 Hornet

== Pod ==
Pod	Origin	Type	In service	Notes
Pod
AN/ASQ-228 ATFLIR	United States	Targeting pod		Used by F/A-18 Hornet
Damocles	France	Targeting pod		Used by Sukhoi Su-30MKM
Knirti SAP-518	Russia	Jammer pod		Used by Sukhoi Su-30MKM

== Radar ==
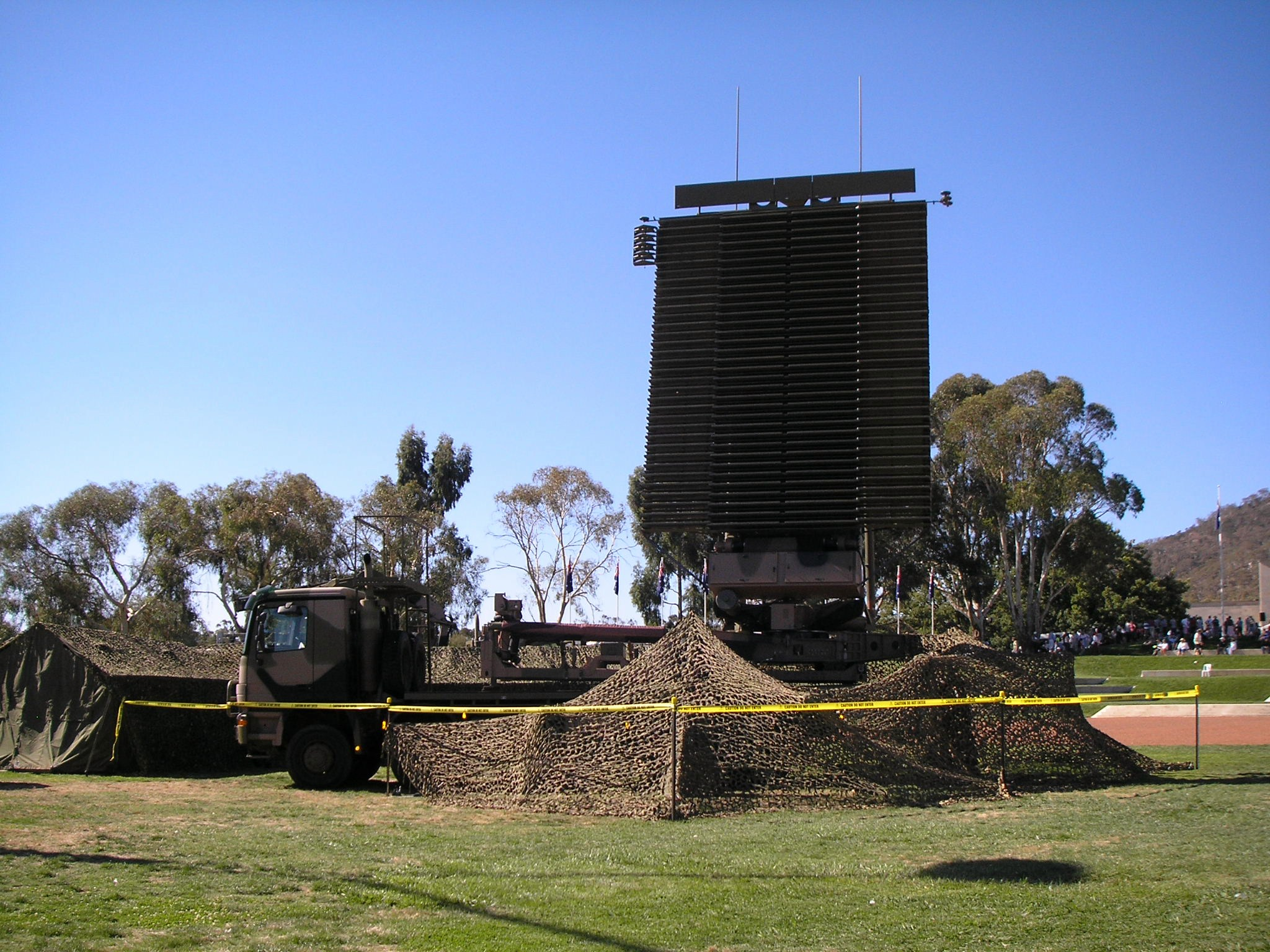
TPS-77 MMR ground based radar

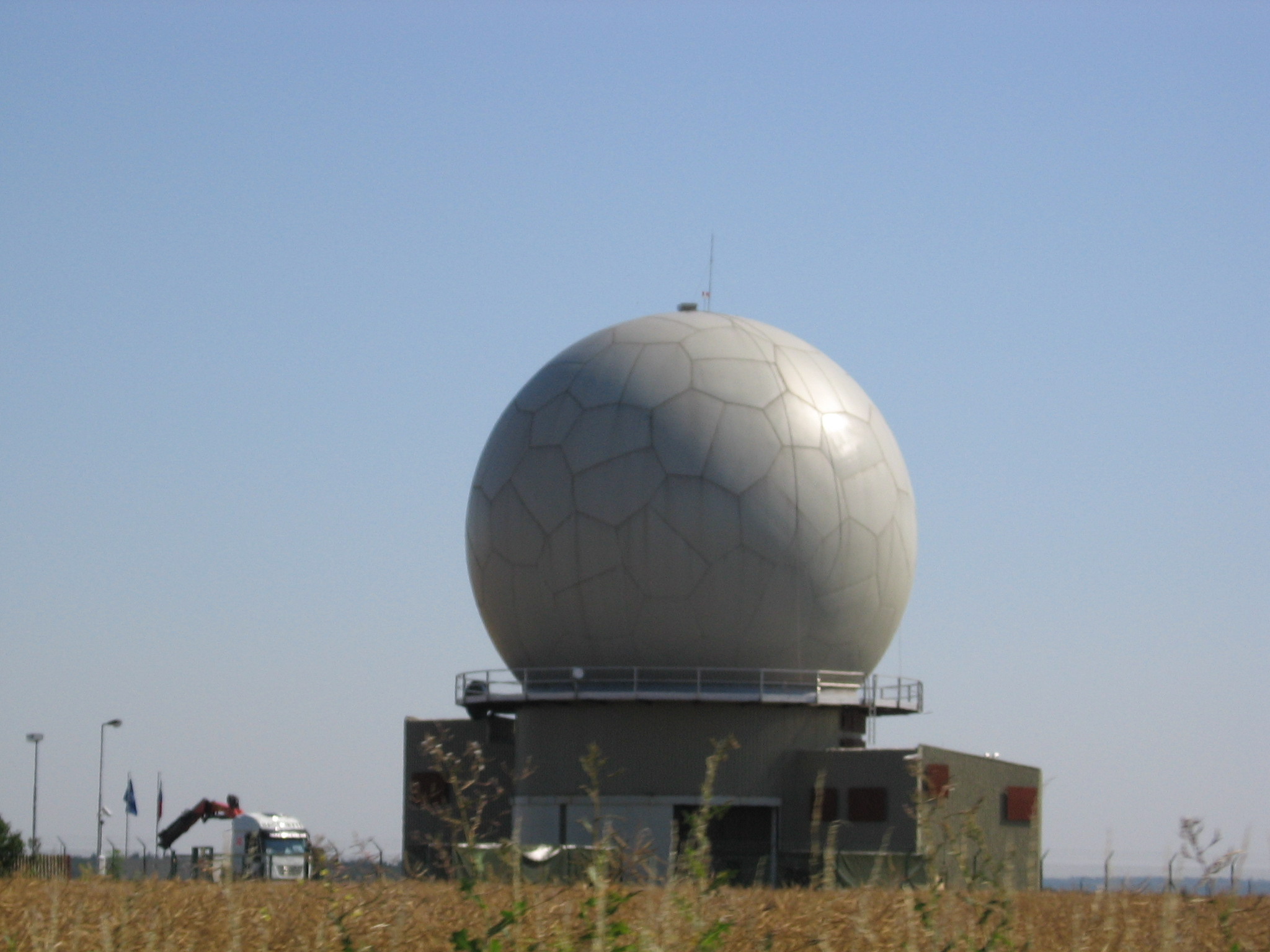
Selex RAT-31 with radome

Radar	Origin	Type	In service	Notes
Radar
Lockheed Martin TPS-77 MMR	United States	Ground based radar	1	
Hughes/Raytheon HADR	United States	Ground based radar	2	
Thales Ground Master 400	France	Ground based radar	1	3 on order (Note: First contract for 1 unit awarded at the end of 2023 and the second contract for the 2 units awarded at May 2025.)
Selex RAT-31	Italy	Ground based radar	3	
Marconi Martello S-743	United Kingdom	Ground based radar	2	
Bars N011M	Russia	Aircraft radar		Used by Sukhoi Su-30MKM
APG-73	United States	Aircraft radar		Used by F/A-18 Hornet
APG-66	United States	Aircraft radar		Used by BAE Hawk 208
Raytheon PhantomStrike	United States	Aircraft radar		Used by FA-50M Block 20

== Air defence ==
Air defence	Origin	Type	In service	Notes
Air defence
Starstreak	United Kingdom	Man-portable air-defense system		Used by RMAF's 401 GBAD

== Firearm ==
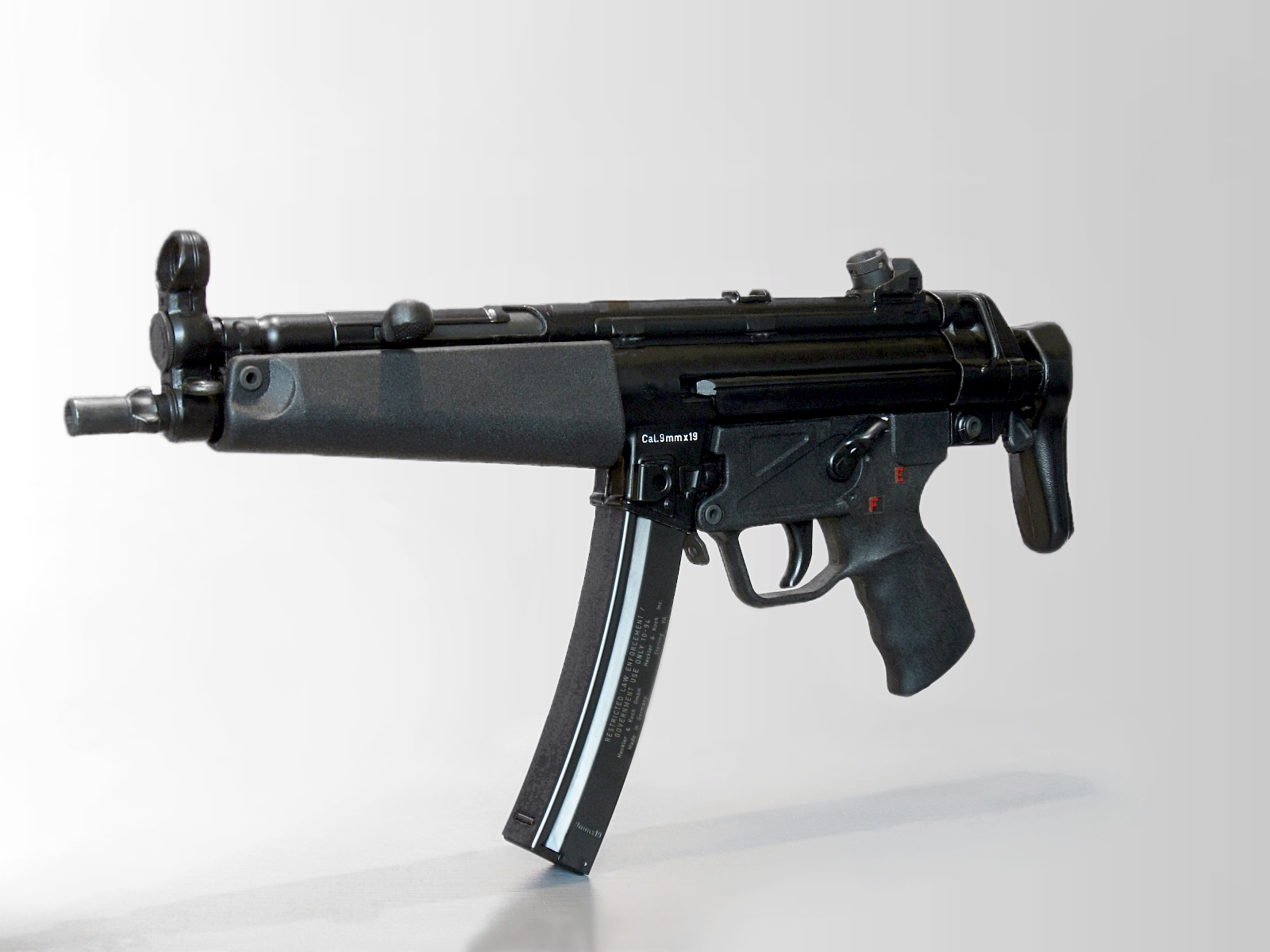
A MP5 submachine gun

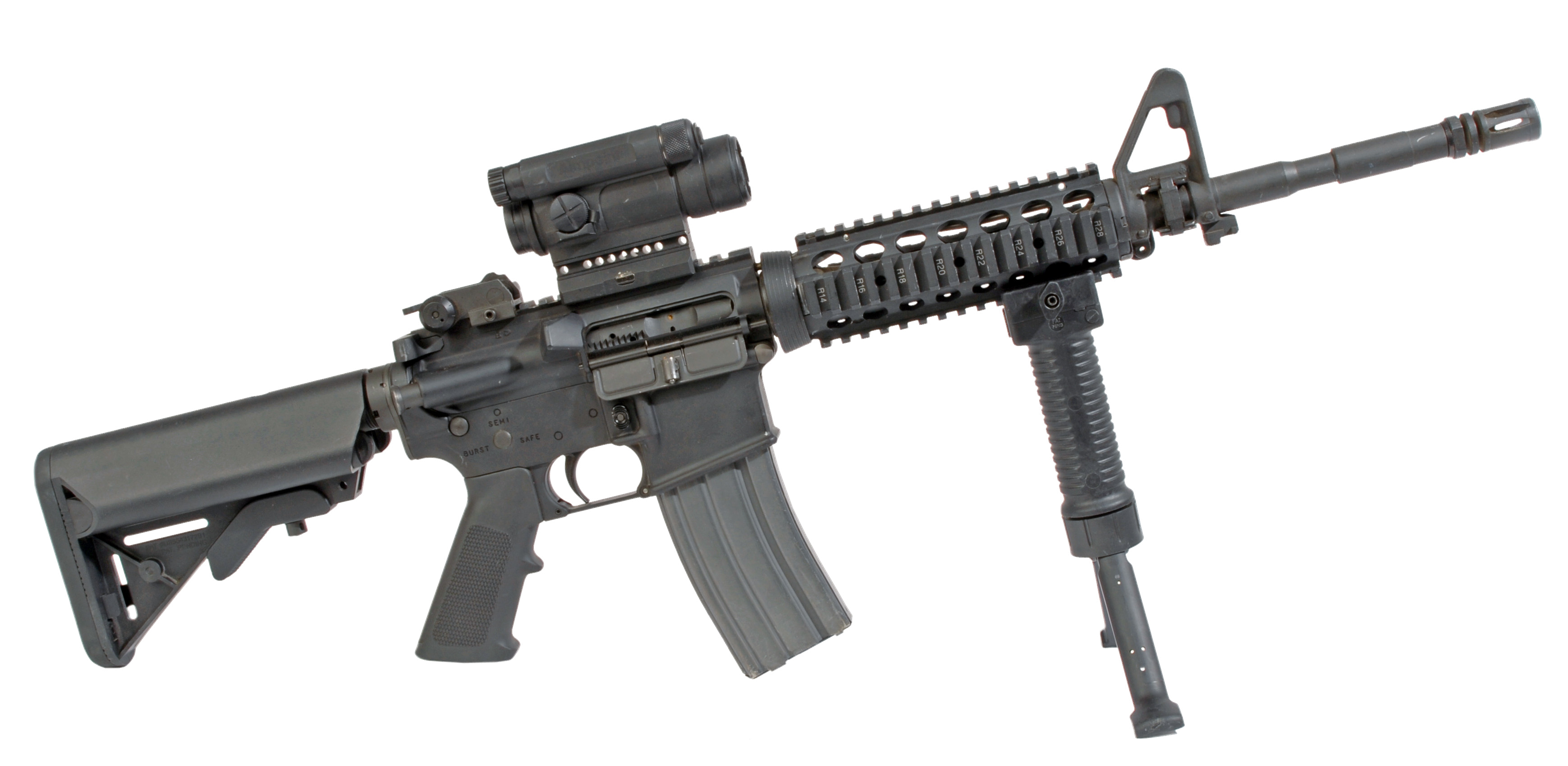
A Colt M4 assault rifle

Firearm	Origin	Type	In service	Notes
Small arms
Browning Hi-Power	Belgium	Semi-auto pistol		
Glock	Austria	Semi-auto pistol		
Mossberg 500	United States	Shotgun		
Remington Model 870	United States	Shotgun		
Remington Model 1100	United States	Shotgun		
Heckler & Koch MP5	Germany	Submachine gun		
Brügger & Thomet MP9	Switzerland	Submachine gun		
Steyr AUG	Austria	Assault rifle		
M4 carbine	United States	Assault rifle		
M16 rifle	United States	Assault rifle		
SIG Sauer 552	Switzerland	Assault rifle		
Heckler & Koch PSG1	Germany	Sniper rifle		
Accuracy International Arctic Warfare	United Kingdom	Sniper rifle		
Barrett M82	United States	Anti-material rifle		
M249	United States	Light machine gun		
FN Minimi Mk.3	Belgium	Light machine gun		
M134 Minigun	United States	Rotary cannon		

== See also ==
- List of equipment of the Malaysian Army
- List of equipment of the Royal Malaysian Navy
- List of aircraft of the Malaysian Armed Forces
- List of equipment of the Malaysian Maritime Enforcement Agency
- List of vehicles of the Royal Malaysian Police
- List of police firearms in Malaysia
