= Multi-Purpose Mission Ship (Malaysia) =

Malaysian offshore patrol vessel

Class overview
- Name: Multi Purpose Mission Ship
- Builders: Desan Shipyard, Turkey
- Operators: Malaysian Maritime Enforcement Agency
- Planned: 2
- Building: 2

General characteristics
- Type: Offshore patrol vessel
- Displacement: 3,300 tonnes
- Length: 99 m (324 ft 10 in)
- Beam: 17 m (55 ft 9 in)
- Speed: 22.0 knots (40.7 km/h; 25.3 mph)
- Endurance: 30 days
- Boats & landing craft carried: 4 x Fast interceptor craft; 4 x Rigid-hulled inflatable boat
- Complement: 70 crew + 30 passenger
- Armament: 1 × 30 mm (1.2 in) Aselsan SMASH 200/30 RCWS; 2-4 × 12.7 mm general purpose machine guns
- Aircraft carried: Helipad for 1 × AgustaWestland AW139 or Eurocopter Dauphin and 2 × Havelsan BAHA UAV

Multi-Purpose Mission Ship (MPMS) is an offshore patrol vessels being built for Malaysia Maritime Enforcement Agency (MMEA) also known as Malaysia Coast Guard. The ship was acquired to further enhance the MMEA's ability to guards Malaysian waters by conducting wider patrols and being able to survive longer time at sea. The ship was built by the Turkish company, Desan Shipyard through a government to government contract in 2025.

== Development ==
MMEA has outlined the need for a larger patrol vessels to patrol further and longer period of time. In response to this needs, Malaysian Government has awarded a contract to build one MPMS vessel to Desan Shipyard worth US$68.8 million in early 2025 through a government to government scheme. In January 2026, a contract to build a second MPMS vessel was awarded to the same company with a contract value of US$83.750 million. Both MPMS are expected to be completed in 2027.

This ship has a length of 99 meters, width of 17 meters, displacement of 3,300 tons and can operate for 30 days without resupply. This ship also equipped with 30 mm Aselsan SMASH RWS and two to four 12.7 mm general purpose machine guns, two unmanned aerial vehicles, four fast interceptor craft and has a helicopter landing pad. MPMS has a crew of 70 and can carry 20 other passengers. In addition, the ship has a treatment rooms and detention rooms for enforcement duty.

== Ships of the class ==
Pennant	Name	Builder	Launched	Commissioned	MMEA Maritime Region	Status
9909	MPMS 1	Desan Shipyard	2 October 2026			Launched
	MPMS 2	Desan Shipyard				Under construction
