= Tun Fatimah-class patrol vessel =

Malaysian offshore patrol vessel

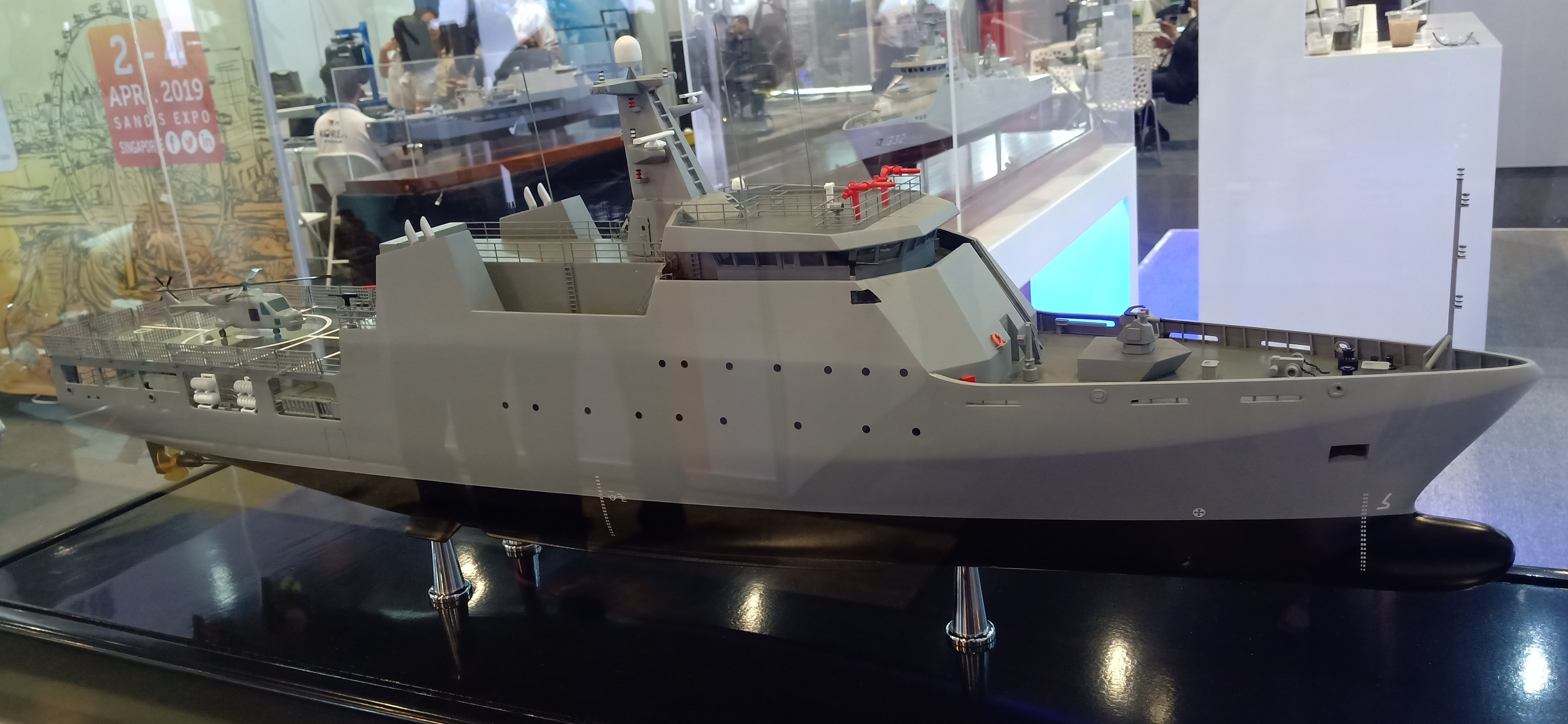
- Scale model of Damen 1800 OPV at ADAS 2018

Class overview
- Name: Tun Fatimah class (Damen 1800)
- Builders: THHE-Destini, Shin Yang, Malaysia; Damen, Netherlands
- Operators: Malaysian Maritime Enforcement Agency
- Planned: 3
- Building: 2
- Completed: 1

General characteristics
- Type: Damen 1800 offshore patrol vessel
- Displacement: 1,890 tonnes
- Length: 83 m (272 ft 4 in)
- Beam: 13.7 m (44 ft 11 in)
- Draught: 3.75 m (12 ft 4 in)
- Propulsion: 4 × Caterpillar engines
- Speed: 22.0 knots (40.7 km/h; 25.3 mph)
- Complement: 46
- Armament: 1 × 30 mm (1.2 in) Aselsan SMASH 200/30 RCWS; 2-4 × 12.7 mm general purpose machine guns
- Aircraft carried: Helipad for 1 × AgustaWestland AW139 or Eurocopter Dauphin and 1 × Alti Transition UAV

The Tun Fatimah class is a series of offshore patrol vessels (OPVs) built by the Malaysian company THHE-Destini with the assistance of Damen company from the Netherlands based on the design of the Damen 1800-class OPV vessel. THHE-Destini is a joint venture between two local companies, which are THHE and the Bagan Datuk-class patrol vessel builder, Destini Berhad. The class is also known as the Damen 1800-class offshore patrol vessel and the class changed names after the first ship of the class, KM Tun Fatimah. A total of three ships of this class are planned to be built. Due to delays in the project, the Malaysian government has appointed a new builder, Shin Yang, to complete the remaining ships.

== Development ==
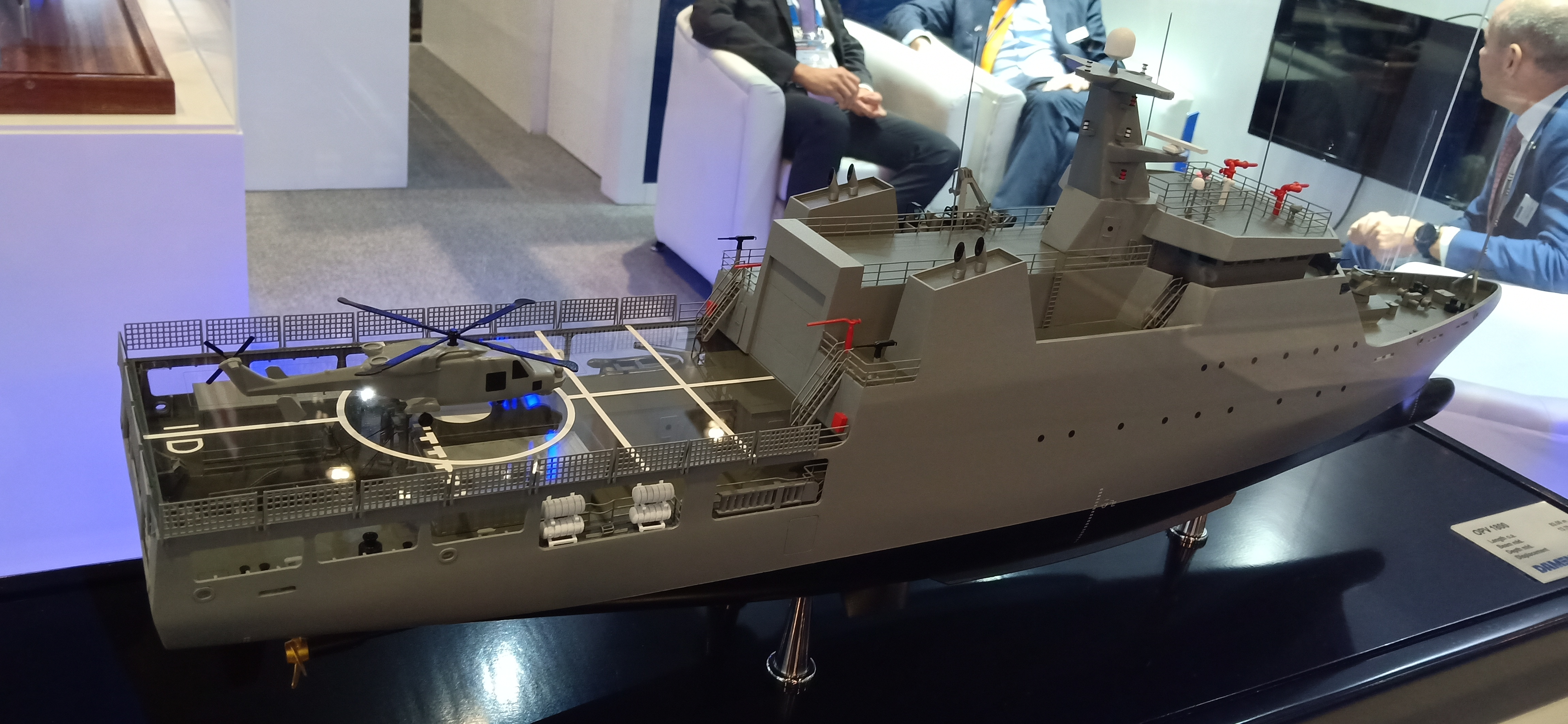
Rear view of Damen 1800 OPV scale model at ADAS 2018

The Damen 1800 OPV contract was awarded to THHE-Destini local company in early 2017. The ship contract is worth RM738.9 million and the construction started in December 2017. The first ship will be completed in mid-2020. The OPV class has a length of 83 metres (272 ft 4 in), a beam of 13.7 metres (44 ft 11 in), and a draught of 3.75 metres (12 ft 4 in). She has a displacement of 1,890 tonnes and a speed of 22 knots (41 km/h; 25 mph). The main armament of the ship are one 1 × 30 mm Aselsan SMASH RWS and light defensive weapons such as 12.7 mm and 7.62 mm machine guns. She also has a complement of 46 crew. To fulfill the patrol duty, she also able to operate one medium-sized helicopter and one unmanned aerial vehicle. All ships will be named after female warriors of Malaysia.

== Ships of the class ==
Pennant	Name	Builder	Launched	Commissioned	MMEA Maritime Region	Status
8305	KM Tun Fatimah	THHE-Destini	10 October 2022	2 January 2024	Sarawak Maritime Region	Active
8306	Damen 1800 (2)	Shin Yang		TBA		Under construction
8307	Damen 1800 (3)	Shin Yang		TBA		Under construction
