= List of equipment of the Malaysian Army =

The equipment of the Malaysian Army can be subdivided into: ground vehicles, unmanned aerial vehicles, aircraft, watercraft, radar, air defence, infantry weapons and attire.

== Ground vehicles ==
Vehicle	Image	Type	Origin	Quantity	Notes
Tanks
PT-91M Pendekar		Main battle tank	Poland	48	Fitted with the SAGEM Savan 12 FCS, VIGY-15 commander's panoramic sight, Obra-3 laser warning system and the Slovak 2A46MS gun.
Armoured fighting vehicles (tracked)
K-200A1 MIFV		Armoured personnel carrier	South Korea	111	Originally purchased under UOR for UNPROFOR, the fleet includes K200A1 Personnel Carriers, K277A1 Command Vehicles, the K288A1 ARV, K200A1 Ambulance and the K281A1 81 mm Self-Propelled Mortar. All vehicles have since been upgraded to A1 standard and retrofitted with Wegmann 76 mm smoke launchers.
ACV-300 Adnan		Infantry fighting vehicle	Turkey; Malaysia	267	License built in Pahang by DefTech. The IFV variants are fitted with a Sharpshooter turret mounting either a 25 mm Bushmaster autocannon or a 40 mm Mark 19 AGL, plus a coaxial 7.62 mm FN MAG. The APC variant is armed with a single 12.7 mm M2HB in the Helio FVT800 turret. Other variants include Command, Signals, ATGM Carrier, Recovery, Fitter, Ambulance, as well as 81 mm and 120 mm Self-Propelled Mortars.
Armoured fighting vehicles (wheeled)
AV8 Gempita		Armoured fighting vehicle	Malaysia	257	Built locally by DefTech. Variants include: IFV25 with the Sharpshooter turret, AFV30 with the Denel LCT30 turret, ATGW Carrier with the ZT3 Ingwe, Command, Signals, Personnel Carrier and CBRN Reconnaissance Vehicle with the Reutech Rogue RWS, SURV with the Rheinmetall Vingtaqs II and Thales Squire, Self-Propelled Mortar with the 120 mm 2R2M, Recovery, Fitter and Ambulance.
Tarantula HMAV		Mine-resistant ambush protected vehicle	Malaysia	0+(136)	136 on order. Fitted with the Aselsan SIPER RWS.
AV4 Lipanbara		Mine-resistant ambush protected vehicle	Thailand; Malaysia	20	Built locally by DefTech. Armed with a 7.62 mm Dillon Aero M134D minigun.
Ejder Yalcin		Mine-resistant ambush protected vehicle	Turkey	20	Locally known as Panthera. Purchased for MALBATT in Lebanon. Fitted with the Aselsan SARP RWS.
Guardian		Mine-resistant ambush protected vehicle	United Arab Emirates	12	Purchased for MALBATT in Lebanon. Optionally armed with a single 7.62 mm FN MAG in an open-top turret.
Chaiseri Jackal		High-mobility armoured vehicle	Thailand	0+(9)	Operated by the Royal Artillery Regiment.
KLTV		High-mobility armoured vehicle	South Korea	0+(17)	Operated by the Royal Artillery Regiment.
Ferret		Ceremonial parade vehicle	United Kingdom	8	At least 8 in service with registration number of 599, 1197, 1199, 2662, 4281, 4567, 4642, 6577.
Tracked articulated all-terrain carriers
Bandvagn 206		Articulated all-terrain personnel/cargo carrier	Sweden	80	Purchased under UOR for UNPROFOR alongside the MIFVs. Both plain cargo/personnel carriers and shelter carriers for the ARTHUR counter-battery radar and the Giraffe 40 air-defence radar.
Light tactical vehicles / Light strike vehicles
URO VAMTAC S3		Light tactical vehicle	Spain	103+	Variant includes FFR command & liaison vehicles, weapons carriers (heavy machine gun and AGL), gun tractors for the Mod 56 pack howitzer and SHORAD platforms with either the Igla Dzhigit twin-launcher or Thales RapidRanger launcher.
Cendana Auto 4x4		Light tactical vehicle	Malaysia	267+ (Note: At the beginning; from the total of 207 units of all variant, 72 units were the Mortar Transporter. In 2024, it is confirmed that the army has increased the order from 72 units to 132 units of the Mortar Transporter bringing the total number of 267 units of all variant.)	Variant includes 70 FFR command & liaison vehicles, 16 SF-21X special operations forces mobility vehicles, 49 weapons carriers (heavy machine gun, AGL and ATGM) and 132 MT-815 mortar transports for the Tecnesis 3000 81 mm mortar.
Weststar GK-M1/M2		Light tactical vehicle	Malaysia	238+	Variant includes FFR command & liaison vehicles, weapons carriers (heavy machine gun and AGL) and air defence platforms with the Thales RapidRover launcher.
Agrale Marruá		Light strike vehicle	Brazil	163+	Locally known as Tedung (Cobra). 83 units with heavy machine gun, 80 units with AGL.
Mercedes-Benz G-Class		Light strike vehicle	Germany	91+	32 units armed with a single 12.7 mm M2HB heavy machine gun, 34 units with the 40 mm Mark 19 AGL, 12 units with the Metis-M ATGM.
Glover Webb Hornet		Light strike vehicle	United Kingdom	unknown	Armed with a single 12.7 mm M2HB heavy machine gun and a 7.62mm Manroy GPMG forward and a 40 mm Mark 19 AGL on the cargo bed.
All-terrain mobility vehicles / Scramblers
Argo Frontier 650		All-terrain mobility vehicle	Canada	7	
Supacat ATMP		All-terrain mobility vehicle	United Kingdom	17	Designated as Supacat 6x6 Drop Zone Recovery.
Can-Am Maverick		All terrain mobility vehicle	Canada	100	Locally known as Kala (Scorpion).
TGB Blade 600 LTX EPS		All terrain mobility vehicle	Taiwan	57	27 units for first batch and 30 units for second batch.
Kawasaki KLX250S		Scrambler	Japan	378	
WMoto SXR 300		Scrambler	Malaysia	70	
Voge 300 Rally		Scrambler	China	unknown	
Talaria Sting R MX4		Scrambler	China	45	
Surron Light Bee X		Scrambler	China	45	
Multiple launch rocket systems
Astros II MLRS		Multiple launch rocket artillery system	Brazil	36	Can launch either SS-30 127 mm unitary HE rockets (32/launcher), SS-40 180 mm submunition-carrying rockets (16/launcher), SS-80 extended-range rockets (4/launcher) or SS-09TS reduced-range training rockets.
Howitzers
CAESAR Mk I		155 mm L/52 self-propelled howitzer	France	0+(18)	Signed during Eurosatory 2026. Will be assemble locally by Advanced Defence Systems Sdn. Bhd. (ADSSB).
Denel G5 Mk III		155 mm L/45 towed howitzer	South Africa	28	Upgraded with new Integrated Fire Control System (IFCS) and other related components by Advanced Defence Systems Sdn. Bhd. (ADSSB).
OTO Melara Mod 56		105 mm towed pack howitzer	Italy	110	
LG1 Mk III		105 mm towed howitzer	France	18+(36)	Assembled locally by Advanced Defence Systems Sdn. Bhd. (ADSSB). First 18 units used exclusively by the 1st Regiment Royal Artillery or 1 RAD (Para) headquartered at Terendak, Melaka. LOI signed as at November 2026 for additional 36 units.
M102		105 mm saluting gun	United States	40	Used exclusively by the 41st Battery (Ceremonial), headquartered at Sungai Buloh, Selangor.
Combat engineering vehicles
MID-M		Armoured engineering vehicle	Poland	3	
PMC Leguan		Armoured vehicle-launched bridge	Poland	5	
Vickers BR-90		Vehicle-launched bridge	United Kingdom	3	Carried on MAN SX2000 32.403VFAEG 8x8 trucks.
CNIM PFM		Vehicle-launched bridge	France	2	
PMP		Floating pontoon bridge	China	2	Carried on Shaanxi CTZ-19X 8x8 trucks.
Mercedes-Benz Actros HGMS		8x8 heavy ground mobility system	Germany	unknown	Prime mover for the Faun Trackway.
MAN TMSS		8x8 tactical mobility support system	Germany	2	Prime mover for the Faun Trackway.
Recovery vehicles
WZT-4		Armoured recovery vehicle	Poland	6	
K288A1 ARV		Armoured recovery vehicle	South Korea	4	Fitted with outriggers, a 3.5-tonne crane and a 10-tonne class recovery winch which can be double rigged for 20-tonne capacity.
ACV-300 Adnan		Armoured recovery vehicle	Turkey; Malaysia	15	Both Fitter and Armoured Recovery variants acquired.
AV8 Gempita		8x8 armoured heavy recovery vehicle	Malaysia	9	
Volvo FMX AHRV		8x8 heavy recovery vehicle	Sweden	9	2 delivered in 2018 and 7 delivered in 2023.
Iveco Trakker 440 HRV		6x6 heavy recovery vehicle	Italy	4	
Volvo FL10 LRV		4x4 light recovery vehicle	Sweden	9	
Isuzu FTS33H LRV		4x4 light recovery vehicle	Japan	13	Designated as the 6 Ton 4x4 HICOM Light Recovery Vehicle.
Mercedes-Benz L-Series LRV		4x4 light recovery vehicle	Germany	22	Based on the LA911 chassis.
Mildef LFRV		4x4 light forward repair vehicle	Malaysia	13	Designated as the Light Forward Repair Vehicle, replacing the previous Defender 110-based LFRV. Based on the Toyota Hilux chassis.
Command, control and communications vehicles
Scania P360		6x6 command centre platform	Sweden	4	Carries a demountable containerised command, control and communications centre.
Tectran AV-UCF		Armoured artillery fire control vehicle	Brazil	6	Provides indirect fire correction and radar projectile tracking for ASTROS II batteries. Fitted with the Rheinmetall FieldGuard radar.
Tactran AV-VBL		Armoured battery command vehicle	Brazil	10	Provides battery fire direction and coordination. Based on the Tectran VBT-2028 6×6 chassis.
Unimog		Mobile satellite communications centre	Germany	13	Fitted with the Kongsberg multi-channel radio system (MRCS) and Getac X500 terminals.
Iveco VM90		Mobile satellite communications centre	Italy	4	40.12WM variant. Designated as Truck, 2 Ton 4x4 HICOM IVECO Satellite Communication.
Iveco Daily		Mobile satellite communications centre	Italy	25	22 units fitted with the Kongsberg multi-channel radio system (MRCS) and Getac X500 terminals. 3 units designated as Tactical Electronic Warfare (TEW) shelter carriers.
Toyota Land Cruiser Prado		Mobile satellite communications centre	Japan	unknown	Designated as Communication on the Pause (COTP). Fitted with a General Dynamics C135M X-band satellite communications antenna (Measat-3b), Research Concepts Inc. RC3000 Antenna Control Unit, Advantech 100W X-band Build-Up Converter, Norsat X1000HA Low Noise Block converter, Viasat modem, Xiplink IP accelerator and Cisco VoIP.
Logistics vehicles
Iveco EuroTrakker 380		Prime mover / tank transporter	Italy	28	
Scania P500		Prime mover / tank transporter	Sweden	5	
Volvo FL7		Prime mover / tank transporter	Sweden	unknown	
Scania R460		8×8 heavy expanded mobility tactical truck	Sweden	3	Designated as Heavy Expanded Mobility Tactical Truck - Multi Cargo Palletised System (HEMTT-MCPLS).
Oshkosh HEMTT		8×8 heavy expanded mobility tactical truck	United States	unknown	
Dongfeng HEMTT		8×8 heavy expanded mobility tactical truck	China	3	
MAN TG MIL		Transport truck	Germany	unknown 14 32	8x8 MAN TG Ground Master 200 radar carrier. 6x6 MAN TG 10 tonne. Delivered in 2026. 4x4 MAN TGM and TGS GS in 3 tonne and 5 tonne variants.
Mercedes-Benz NG		Transport truck	Germany	unknown	
Tatra 815		Transport truck	Czech Republic	unknown	5 tonne GS truck.
Iveco EuroCargo		Transport truck	Italy	196	150 3 tonne GS and 12 5 tonne GS trucks in service. 4 new units were ordered in 2023 and another 30 in 2024. All delivered in 2026.
Isuzu F Series		Transport truck	Japan	39	29 GS variants were initially purchased, followed by another 10 vehicles in 2014. Designated as Multipurpose Inventory Mobile Vehicles (MIMV).
DefTech Handalan		Transport truck	Malaysia	2,674	Locally assembled by DefTech. 1,553 units of the Handalan I, (GS Cargo, Troop Transporter & Communications Shelter). 707 units of the Handalan II (GS Cargo & Troop Transporter).
AMDAC		Transport truck	Malaysia	unknown	License manufactured Roman and DAC trucks with Euro3 engines. 4x4 and 6x6 trucks were locally produced until the turn of the millennium. Variants include: 33.400DFA Heavy Recovery, 32.360DFA Water Tanker, 26.410DFAES Ribbon Bridge Carrier, 26.360DFA G5 Gun Tractor, 22.360DFA G5 Gun Tractor, 16.310FAEG Expandable Shop Van, 15.240FAEG Oerlikon Gun Tractor (GAPU).
Mowag Duro II		Transport truck	Switzerland	57	Locally assembled by DefTech. Designated as Truck, 2 Tonne 6x6 HICOM DURO High Mobility Troop Transporter (HMTT) & High Mobility Command Vehicle (HMCV). Rarely seen since the mid-2010s.
Pinzgauer multi-purpose vehicle		Transport truck	Austria	330	Locally assembled by DefTech. 68 units of the 716M Soft Top (2 Tonne 4x4 Pinzgauer Gun Tractor) for towing the Mod 56. 164 units of the 718M (2 Tonne 6x6 Pinzgauer Mortar Carrier c/w Ammunition Trailer). Experienced significant sustainment and readiness issues leading to their premature retirement in the mid-2010s.
Iveco Daily		Transport truck	Italy	36	Gun tractors for the Mod 56.
Iveco VM90		Field ambulance	Italy	25	40.10WM variant. Designated as Truck, 2 Tonne 4x4 HICOM IVECO M4010 Field Ambulance.
Ford F550		Field ambulance	United States	18	
Mitsubishi Canter		Field ambulance	Japan	unknown	
Land Rover Defender 110		Multi-purpose vehicle	United Kingdom	3,600	Largely replaced by the Weststar GK-M1/M2 and a variety of commercial light utility vehicles (see below).
DefTech / Weststar / Cendana Auto / High Point Worldwide / Go Auto GS Cargo		Light utility vehicle	Malaysia	493	365 in service as of 2021. 128 new vehicles supplied in two batch (46+82) in 2025. Designated as 1 Tonne GS Cargo Truck.
Toyota Hilux		Light utility vehicle	Japan	unknown	Designated as 1 Tonne GS Cargo Truck.
Isuzu D-Max		Light utility vehicle	Japan	unknown	Designated as 1 Tonne GS Cargo Truck.
Mitsubishi Triton		Light utility vehicle	Japan	unknown	Designated as 1 Tonne GS Cargo Truck.
Ford Ranger		Light utility vehicle	United States	unknown	Designated as 1 Tonne GS Cargo Truck.
Miscellaneous
SJ-09		Training tank	Poland	1	

== Unmanned aerial vehicles ==
Unmanned aerial vehicle	Image	Type	Origin	Quantity	Notes
Unmanned aerial vehicles
FlyEye		Tactical unmanned aerial vehicle	Poland	unknown	
CW-25D		Tactical unmanned aerial vehicle	China	6	6 drones and 2 command vehicles.
CW-15		Tactical unmanned aerial vehicle	China	unknown	
CW-007		Tactical unmanned aerial vehicle	China	unknown	
Aerobo Wing AS-VTO2		Tactical unmanned aerial vehicle	Japan	6	
Schiebel Camcopter S-100		Tactical unmanned aerial vehicle (VTOL)	Austria	unknown	
DJI Matrice		Tactical unmanned aerial vehicle (VTOL)	China	unknown	DJI Matrice 210 version in service.
DJI Mavic		Tactical unmanned aerial vehicle (VTOL)	China	unknown	DJI Mavic 2 version in service.
SkyRanger R60		Tactical unmanned aerial vehicle (VTOL)	Canada	unknown	

== Aircraft ==
Aircraft	Image	Type	Variant	Origin	Quantity	Notes
Helicopters
MD Helicopters MD 500 Defender		Light attack helicopter	MD530G	United States	6	Equipped with the Thales Scorpion helmet-mounted display and a L3Harris Wescam MX-10 FLIR turret. (Note: While the MX-10 can laser designate AGM-114 Hellfires as well as APKWS II and FZ275 laser guided rockets, none of the three have been known to be in operation with the Malaysian Army.) The outboard hardpoints can mount two of the following: FN HMP400 12.7 mm gun pods, FN RMP combined 3-round 70 mm rocket/heavy machine gun pods, Thales FZ220 7-round 70 mm rocket pods. Optionally, the inboard hardpoints can mount two 7.62 mm Dillon Aero M134D miniguns, feeding from two 3000-round ammunition containers in the rear cabin.
AgustaWestland AW109		Scout / light utility helicopter	A109LUH	Italy	10	Armed with either a cabin-mounted 7.62 mm Dillon Aero M134D minigun, or two 20 mm Nexter NC621 gun pods and/or Thales FZ220 7-round 70 mm rocket pods for area suppression.
AgustaWestland AW149		Medium utility helicopter		Italy	0+(4)	4 on order. Delivery in 2027.

== Watercraft ==
Watercraft	Image	Type	Origin	Quantity	Notes
Watercraft
Powercraft Marine MAC		Medium assault craft	Malaysia	unknown	15 meter medium assault craft.
Powecraft Marine LCD		Landing craft (diving support)	Malaysia	unknown	13 meter landing craft (diving support).
MRI Technologies Viper		Interceptor boat	Malaysia	10+	8.18 meter interceptor boat powered by two 250 hp Yamaha outboard motors. Top speed of 50 kn.
MRI Technologies Rover Stingray		Interceptor boat	Malaysia	10+	9.85 meter interceptor boat powered by two 250 hp Yamaha outboard motors. Top speed of 40 kn.
MSET FIC ALUM 1300 RHFB		Interceptor boat	Malaysia	9+	12.20 meter interceptor powered by two 370 hp Mercury VW V8 engines. Top speed of 40 kn.
MSET Rigid Inflatable Boat Tornado		Rigid hull inflatable boat	Malaysia	12+	11.5 meter boat based on MSET RFB 1150 FAC powered by two 300 hp Suzuki outboard motors. Top speed of 50 kn.
Offshore Raiding Craft		Troop-carrying rigid hull raiding craft	Malaysia	14+	Used by the Amphibious Company of the 10th Para Brigade.
Assault Boat		Assault boat	Malaysia	100+	
RXT-X 300CV		Jet ski	Canada	6	
Airlift Kaiman		Hovercraft	Australia	6	

== Radar ==
Name	Image	Type	Variant	Origin	Quantity	Notes
Radars
VERA		Mobile passive ESM surveillance system	VERA E	Czech Republic	unknown	
ARTHUR		Counter-battery radar		Sweden	2	
EADS TRML		Mobile 3D aerial surveillance radar	TRML 3D	European Union	2	
THALES Ground Master		Mobile aerial surveillance radar	Ground Master 200	France	1	
Saab Giraffe		Mobile short-range air defence radar	Giraffe 40	Sweden	2	
Skyguard		Mobile I/J/K-band fire-control radar and electro-optical tracker		Switzerland	4	
Alenia Marconi Dagger		Mobile J-band 3D air surveillance radar		United Kingdom	3	
Blindfire		Mobile F-band fire-control radar and electro-optical tracker		United Kingdom	3	
THALES SQUIRE		Battlefield surveillance radar		France	24	
Rheinmetall Vingtaqs II		Electro-optical surveillance system		Germany	24	
Rheinmetall Fieldguard		Mobile rocket artillery fire control radar	Fieldguard 3	Germany	6	
Aselsan Askarad		Portable X-band battlefield surveillance and fire direction radar		Turkey	7	
Sperry Marine VisionMaster		Static X-band coastal surveillance radar	VisionMaster FT	United States	8	Also known as 1206 radars in Malaysian Army service.

== Air defence ==
Air defense	Image	Type	Variant	Origin	Quantity	Notes
Surface-to-air missiles
Rapier		Ground based air defence system / SHORAD	Rapier Jernas	United Kingdom	15	15 Jernas launchers with more than 150 missiles.
RapidRanger / RapidRover		Vehicle mounted air defence system / SHORAD	ForceSHIELD System	United Kingdom	28	ForceSHIELD System. 24 RapidRanger / LML launchers procured in 2015 and 4 more procured in 2025. Installed on URO VAMTAC, Cendana Auto Tornado and Weststar GK-M1/M2.
Igla Dzhigit		Vehicle mounted air defence system / SHORAD	Dzhigit Twin-Launcher	Russia	40	Installed on URO VAMTAC S3.
Starstreak		Man-portable air defence system	Lightweight Multiple Launcher	United Kingdom	120	
Igla		Man-portable air defence system		Russia	382	
Anza		Man-portable air defence system	Anza Mk.I Anza Mk.II	Pakistan	600	100 Anza Mk.I systems delivered for the first batch and 500 Anza MK.II systems delivered for the second batch.
FN-6		Man-portable air defence system		China	64	
Anti-aircraft artillery
Bofors 40 mm Automatic Gun L/70		Anti-aircraft artillery	40x365 mm HE-VT	Sweden	36	BOFI variant with laser rangefinder, electro-optical FCS and diesel APU.
Oerlikon GDF		Anti-aircraft artillery	35x228 mm HE-I	Switzerland	28	GDF-003 variant.

== Infantry weapons ==
Weapon	Image	Type	Calibre	Variant	Origin	Notes
Double-action / Single-action pistols
Glock 17		Striker-fired pistol	9×19 mm Parabellum	Glock 17 GEN3	Austria	Standard issue sidearm for officers and special forces forces.
SIG Sauer P226		Double-action / single-action pistol	9×19 mm Parabellum		Switzerland	Unknown quantity used by GGK.
Vektor SP1		Double-action / single-action pistol	9×19 mm Parabellum		South Africa	In reserve. Largely replaced by Glock 17s. Some examples surplused and imported into the United States.
Heckler & Koch P9		Double-action / single-action pistol	9×19 mm Parabellum	P9S	Germany	In reserve. Largely replaced by Glock 17s. Some examples surplused and imported into the United States.
Browning Hi-Power		Single-action pistol	9×19 mm Parabellum		Belgium	In reserve. First supplanted by the P9S during the 2nd Emergency and later replaced in line service by the SP1 and Glock 17.
Beretta 92		Double-action / single-action pistol	9×19 mm Parabellum	92FS	Italy	Optional privately-purchased sidearm for senior officers and special forces operators.
Tanfoglio Limited		Competition pistol	9×19 mm Parabellum	Tanfoglio Limited Custom	Italy	30 purchased in 2021 for the Malaysian Army Shooting Team and 10th Bde (Para) HQ. Some also distributed to EMED and STRIDE.
Shotguns
Franchi LAW-12		Semi-automatic shotgun	12 gauge		Italy	Small quantities in use by the Grup Gerak Khas (GGK).
Benelli M4		Semi-automatic shotgun	12 gauge	M4 Super 90	Italy	Used by Grup Gerak Khas (GGK).
Remington 870		Pump-action shotgun	12 gauge		United States	
Mossberg 500		Pump-action shotgun	12 gauge	Mossberg 590	United States	Pre-590 variant with wooden pump. Used by 10th Bde (Para) and Royal Malay Regiment.
Submachine guns
Beretta PMX		Submachine gun	9×19 mm Parabellum		Italy	47 units delivered in 2022.
SIG MPX		Submachine gun	9×19 mm Parabellum	MPX-K	Germany	155 units ordered in 2022.
Heckler & Koch MP5		Submachine gun	9×19 mm Parabellum	MP5A3 MP5K-A4 MP5SD2 MP5SD3	West Germany	Used by 10th Bde (Para) and GGK. Some have been retrofitted with B&T BT-21262-1 NAR Univeral Mount and Steiner/Laser Devices LDITL-M lighted forends.
Assault rifles
M4 carbine		Carbine	5.56×45 mm NATO	M4A1 M4A1 Heavy Barrel (RO977HB)	United States; Malaysia	Standard issue service rifle. Manufactured under licence by SME Ordnance. In GGK service some have been retrofitted with B&T accessory rails. Accessories include: Steiner DBAL-A2 or Beamshot LAS31/LLC-IR laser illuminator/target pointers; Trijicon 4x TA32 ACOG scopes with Docter or RMR sights; Aimpoint CompM4s, Micro T-1/T-2, or Sightmark Ultrashot A-Spec red dot sights; and EOTech 552 holographic sights. Some two dozen or so carbines with iron sights were delivered to the Malaysian Army Shooting Team in 2015.
Steyr AUG		Assault rifle	5.56×45 mm NATO	AUG A1 AUG A2 AUG A3 F88SA2	Austria; Malaysia	Formerly made under licence by SME Ordnance, now in reserve and largely replaced by M4A1s. 40 additional A3 variants acquired in 2025 for the Malaysian Army Shooting Team, supplanting the existing AUG A2s. These are fitted with the Elcan 1-4x SpecterDS optic.
M16 rifle		Assault rifle	5.56×45 mm NATO	M16A1 M16A4	United States	Regular army units still use the M16A1 as a host for the M203 at the squad level. Otherwise relegated to the Territorial Army and ceremonial duties. A small number of M16A4s fitted with Elcan SpecterDR 1-4x optics are used by the Malaysian Army Shooting Team.
CAR-15		Carbine	5.56×45 mm NATO	Model 653	United States	In reserve. Formerly issued to special forces, 10th Bde (Para), RRD and other specialty units.
Heckler & Koch HK33		Assault rifle	5.56×45 mm NATO	HK33A2	West Germany	In limited service. Briefly used by regular units before itself being replaced with M16A1s. Some units retain examples for historical and public display.
SIG SG 550		Carbine	5.56×45 mm NATO	SG 553 SB	Switzerland	Used by 165 Military Intelligence Battalion and GGK.
Colt CM901		Battle rifle	7.62×51 mm NATO		United States	Unknown quantity purchased. Reportedly issued to specific infantry units in Sabah.
Sniper rifles
Barrett M95		Anti-materiel rifle	12.7×99 mm NATO		United States	Used by GGK. Fitted with Barrett Optical Ranging System (BORS).
Barrett M82		Anti-materiel rifle	12.7×99 mm NATO	M107 M107A1	United States	Standard issue anti-materiel rifle alongside the Harris Gun Works M-96. Used by 10 Bde (Para)'s Pathfinder unit. 40 additional units ordered in 2020 and 19 new M107A1 variant acquired in 2025.
Harris Gun Works M-96		Anti-materiel rifle	12.7×99 mm NATO		United States	Standard issue anti-material rifle.
Denel NTW-20		Anti-materiel rifle	20×82 mm Mauser		South Africa	Used by 10 Bde (Para)'s Pathfinder unit.
Sako TRG		Sniper rifle	.308 Winchester	TRG-22	Finland	Used by GGK.
Accuracy International Arctic Warfare		Sniper rifle	.308 Winchester	Arctic Warfare Arctic Warfare Covert	United Kingdom	Used by 10th Parachute Brigade and GGK. Uses the Schmidt and Bender PM II 6x42 optic.
Accuracy International AX Series		Sniper rifle	7.62×51 mm NATO	AX308	United Kingdom	Standard issue sniper rifle for 10th Parachute Brigade. 28 additional units ordered in 2020.
Barrett REC-10		Designated marksman rifle	7.62×51 mm NATO		United States	Used by GGK.
Machine guns
M249		Light machine gun	5.56×45 mm NATO	U.S. Ordnance M249	Belgium; United States	210 acquired in 2025 from U.S. Ordnance.
FN Minimi		Light machine gun	5.56×45 mm NATO	Minimi 5.56 Mk.II Minimi 5.56 Mk.III	Belgium	Standard issue light machine gun. 240 additional units ordered in 2020.
Heckler & Koch HK21		General-purpose machine gun	7.62×51 mm NATO	HK11E	West Germany	Relegated to the Rejimen Sempadan.
Daewoo M60 machine gun		General-purpose machine gun	7.62×51 mm NATO		United States; South Korea	Delivered with the MIFV. In reserve. Largely replaced by FN MAG.
FN MAG		General purpose machine gun	7.62×51 mm NATO	MAG 60.20 MAG 60.40 Manroy GPMG	Belgium; United Kingdom	Standard general purpose machine gun. Originally sourced from Manroy Engineering in the UK, as distinguished by the L7-style carry handle.
Dillon Aero M134 Minigun		Rotary machine gun	7.62×51 mm NATO	M134D	United States	Mounted on AV4 Lipanbara, Weststar GK-M1/M2 and AW109.
M2HB		Heavy machine gun	12.7×99 mm NATO	FN M2HB QCB Manroy L1A2 U.S. Ordnance M2HB CANiK M2 QCB Mertsav MHMG-127	Belgium United Kingdom United States Turkey	Small number purchased alongside M249s from U.S. Ordnance. The CANiK M2s were originally purchased for MALBATT in UNIFIL. 86 MMHG-127s were acquired in 2025.
Remote controlled weapon stations
Aselsan SIPER		Remote controlled weapon station	12.7×99 mm NATO		Turkey	Mounted on Mildef Tarantula.
Aselsan SARP		Remote controlled weapon station	7.62×51 mm or 12.7×99 mm NATO		Turkey	Mounted on Ejder Yalcin.
Reutech Rogue		Remote controlled weapon station	12.7×99 mm NATO		South Africa	Mounted on AV8 Gempita.
Grenade-based weapons
M203 grenade launcher		Under-barrel grenade launcher	40×46 mm LV	Colt M203 Colt M203A1 Colt M203A2	United States	Attached to M16A1 and M4A1.
M79 grenade launcher		Single-shot grenade launcher	40×46 mm LV		United States	In reserve. Formerly used by GGK.
Milkor MGL		Multi-shot grenade launcher	40×46 mm LV		South Africa	Standard issue grenade launcher.
Mk 19 grenade launcher		Automatic grenade launcher	40×53 mm HV	Mark 19 Mod 3	United States	
RUAG HG 85		Fragmentation grenade	155g RDX/TNT		Switzerland	
Sohni THG-67		Practice grenade			Estonia	Designated as Eco-Friendly Training Hand Grenade. Clay body with small bursting charge and yellow smoke marker.
SME Ordnance Mark IV		Signal smoke grenade	170g dye mixture		United Kingdom; Malaysia	Copy of the British WW2-era Grenade, Hand, Smoke, No 83 Mk 2 with Striker Mechanism No.4, using modern filler. Produced in the usual Red, Blue, Yellow and Green varieties.
Mortars
Thales 2R2M mortar		Mortar carrier	120 mm		France	Total of 16 in service. 8 installed in ACV-300 Adnan and 8 installed in AV8 Gempita SPM120 variants.
Tecnesis 3000 mortar		Mortar carrier	81 mm		Spain	Total of 132 in service. Installed on Cendana Auto 4x4 completed with Talos FCS.
Expal M86 mortar		Mortar	81 mm		Spain	
2B14 mortar		Mortar	82 mm		Russia	
L16 mortar		Mortar	81 mm		United Kingdom; Canada	
Denel Vektor M8 mortar		Mortar	81 mm		South Africa	
Yugoimport M69 mortar		Mortar	81 mm	M69B	Yugoslavia	In limited service and being replaced by the Tecnesis mortars. Now issued to Rejimen Sempadan for their organic Support Companies.
Yugoimport Commando M70 mortar		Mortar	60 mm		Yugoslavia	
Hirtenberger M6 mortar		Mortar	60 mm		Austria	
Esperanza mortar		Mortar	60 mm		Spain	
Anti-tank weapons
Roketsan Karaok		Anti-tank guided missile	125 mm imaging infrared (IIR) fire-and-forget tandem HEAT		Turkey	18 launcher and 108 missiles on order. Mounted on Cendana Auto 4x4.
Denel ZT3 Ingwe		Anti-tank guided missile	127 mm SALH tandem HEAT		South Africa	54 LCT30 ATGM turrets and 216 missiles in inventory. Mounted on the AV8 Gempita ATGW variant.
Baktar-Shikan		Anti-tank guided missile	120 mm SACLOS single-stage HEAT with standoff probe		Pakistan	450 in inventory. Mounted on the ACV-300 Adnan.
9K115-2 Metis-M		Anti-tank guided missile	130 mm tandem HEAT		Russia	100 in inventory, possibly time-expired. Mounted on Mercedes-Benz 290GD weapon carriers.
Saab Bofors Dynamics NLAW		Anti-tank guided missile	150 mm PLOS top-attack HEAT		United Kingdom; Sweden	500 in inventory. Used by GGK and 10 Bde (Para).
Santa Bárbara Sistemas M40 recoilless rifle		Recoilless rifle	105x607 mm single-stage HEAT / HEP / APERS	M40A2	Spain	24 in inventory, used by 10 Bde (Para).
Saab Bofors Dynamics Carl Gustaf		Recoilless rifle	84x245 mm single-stage HEAT / HE-TF	M2 (late) M4	Sweden	Standard issue company-level direct-fire anti-tank/anti-structure weapon. Late production M2 variant (with carry handle) in service. 110 additional units of the latest M4 variant ordered in 2021.
RPG-7		Rocket-propelled grenade	40 mm single-stage HEAT	POF RPG-7 Namenska RBR-7 Arsenal ATGL-L	Pakistan Serbia Bulgaria	Standard issue squad-level infantry anti-tank weapon. 150 additional units of RBR-7 ordered in 2021. Seen with PUS-7 subcaliber training projectile.
M72 LAW		Rocket-propelled grenade	66 mm single-stage HEAT	M72 EC LAW MKE HAR 66	Norway Turkey	In service with 10 Bde (Para) since 2015. Turkish made LAW, equivalent to M72A3. 800 units ordered in 2024.
Instalaza C90-CR		Rocket-propelled grenade	90 mm single-stage HEAT	C90-CR (M3) C90-CR (M3.5)	Spain	In service since 1990. Two batch procured in 2024.: 780 Disposable (HEDP); 178 Reusable

== Attire ==
Attire	Pattern name(s)	Pattern	Image	Notes
Current attire
Digital Pattern or Harimau Belang Pattern	Digital Woodland Pattern or Harimau Belang Pattern 90			The Malaysian Armed Forces (Malay: Angkatan Tentera Malaysia, ATM) introduced the Uniform No.5 with new digital camo patterns during ATM's 80th Anniversary Parade on 21 September 2013. The new woodland pattern is well known as Fabrik Celoreng Corak Digital Tentera Darat is made from 65% cotton / 35% polyester ripstop fabrics. Its colour scheme consists of green (40%), beige (30%), dark brown (25%), and dark blue (5%). Digital pattern manufactured by Sritex (PT Sri Rejeki Isman Tbk). Locally known as "Baju Celoreng Harimau Belang". Since there are black stripes on a 4-colour woodland background, also known as "Zebra Camo" or "Malay Tigerstripes". This camo was initially adopted by Malaysian Army 10th Para Brigade in Langkawi.
Harimau Gurun Desert Pattern				It is a variant of Malay Tigerstripe Woodland pattern but with earth-brown stripes on a light green and sand-coloured background. Used by Malbatt, part of Malaysian Army peacekeeping corps in Lebanon under UN. Known to be manufactured by Sritex.
	Physical Fitness Uniform			

== Historical equipment ==
=== Ground vehicles ===
- FV101 Scorpion
- Alvis Stormer
- SIBMAS
- Condor APC
- Cadillac Gage Commando
- Panhard AML
- Panhard M3
- Daimler

=== Artillery ===
- FH-70 Field Howitzer

=== Anti-tank weapons ===
- Eryx
- AT4

=== Anti-aircraft weapons ===
- Starburst
- Javelin

== Procurement ==
Since the recovery from the 1997 economic crisis, Malaysian Army, along with other branches of the Malaysian Armed Forces, has regained momentum in its modernising programs.

Modernisation program	Asset	Origin	Type	Quantity	Notes
Personnel equipment
Future Soldier System Program	Sapura SAKTI Soldier System	Malaysia	Soldier equipment		The Malaysian Army currently has a soldier modernisation program called the Future Soldier System (FSS). Under the FSS, The Malaysian Army plans to equip all soldiers with Personal Protection Equipment (PPE) such as high-cut ballistic helmets, individual body armors, ballistic eyewear and hearing protection. The programme also includes retrofitting issued M4 carbines with RIS kits, as well as equipping soldiers with a Glock pistol. Sapura, a Malaysian electronics company, is offering their SAKTI Soldier System concept via work in three areas: Head Sub-System (HSS), Body Sub-System (BSS) and Weapon Sub-System (WSS). The FSS in conjunction with the Network Centric Operation (NCO) System, will give the three branches of the Armed Forces a shared situational awareness, interoperability and a common operating picture via an X-band satellite-based link and an unmanned aerial vehicle (UAV) system, with hopes to enable self-synchronisation for all three branches. The programme will go through several phases, with Phase 1A (the implementation of the Mobile X-band satellite communication linked) and Phase 2 (the demonstration of the capabilities of the FSS with NCO) being successful and operational in 2017.
Assault Rifle Program	CAR 816	United Arab Emirates; Malaysia	Assault rifle		Will be produced in Malaysia by Ketech Asia.
Armoured vehicle
Condor (4x4) Replacement Program	Mildef Tarantula HMAV 4x4	Malaysia	High mobility armoured vehicle	136 on order	136 vehicles ordered.
SIBMAS (6x6) Replacement Program	FNSS Pars 6x6 Otokar Arma 6×6 Hanwha Tigon 6×6 Doosan DST Black Fox 6×6 Hyundai Rotem K806 6×6 Pindad Anoa 6×6 VBTP-MR Guarani 6x6	Turkey South Korea Indonesia Brazil	Infantry fighting vehicle / Armoured personnel carrier	200+ planned	About 250+ vehicle were request by the army. The contenders of this program are FNSS Pars 6×6 and Otokar Arma 6×6 from Turkey, Hanwha Tigon 6×6, Doosan DST Black Fox 6×6, Hyundai Rotem K806 6×6 from South Korea, Pindad Anoa 6×6 from Indonesia and VBTP-MR Guarani 6×6 from Brazil. While another Malaysian company AVP Engineering has teamed up with a South Korean-defence company Doosan DST to offer Black Fox 6x6 wheeled armoured vehicle if it was selected by the Malaysian government. Hanwha and FNSS also offered their armoured vehicles, the Tigon 6x6 and Pars 6x6 respectively, for evaluation by Malaysian Army.
Artillery
155 mm Self-Propelled Howitzer Program	CAESAR Mk I 6×6	France	Self-propelled howitzer	18 on order	In 2018 the United States authorised the transfer of 29 Excess Defence Article M109A5 SPHs to the Malaysian Army, but this deal was cancelled. After the cancellation of the M109 deal, Malaysian government expressed interest in the CAESAR 6×6 SPH and MKEK Yavuz T-155 6×6 from France and Turkey. During DSA 2022, Nexter Group along with a Malaysian company, Advance Defence System Sdn. Bhd. has signed a Memorandum of Understanding (MoU) to provide CAESAR 6×6 to Malaysian Army as well as local assembly. At DSA 2022, BAE System Bofors from Sweden offered their Archer 6×6 SPH. Local defence compant Weststar also offered through their joint venture with Koñstrukta the EVA 155 mm SPH. Other potential contenders included the Yugoimport Nora B-52, Denel T5-52, and Norinco SH-15 155 SPH.
105 mm Towed Howitzer Program	GIAT LG1 MKE Boran	France Turkey	Towed howitzer	36 approved	Tender floated in October 2025.

== See also ==
- List of equipment of the Royal Malaysian Navy
- List of equipment of the Royal Malaysian Air Force
- List of aircraft of the Malaysian Armed Forces
- List of equipment of the Malaysian Maritime Enforcement Agency
- List of vehicles of the Royal Malaysian Police
- List of police firearms in Malaysia
