= Aselsan SMASH 200/30 =

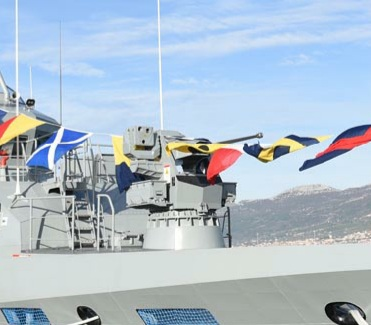
- Aselsan SMASH 200/30 on Croatian patrol boat Omiš (OOB-31)
- Type: Remote controlled weapon station
- Place of origin: Turkey

Production history
- Designer: Aselsan
- Manufacturer: Aselsan

Specifications
- Mass: <1,400 kilograms (3,100 lb) (Including gun and 200 rds ammunition)
- Crew: 1
- Caliber: 30×173mm
- Elevation: -20 (±2)° / +70 (±2)° (gun) -30 (±2)° / +80 (±2)° (EO sights)
- Traverse: ±135° (without slipring); 360° (with slipring); Angular speed: 60 degrees per second
- Rate of fire: 200 rounds/min
- Muzzle velocity: 1,080 metres per second (3,500 ft/s) (HEI-T ammunition)
- Effective firing range: 5,100 metres (16,700 ft)
- Feed system: Dual
- Sights: Thermal camera, TV camera and laser rangefinder

The Aselsan SMASH 200/30 is a type of remote controlled weapon station manufactured by Aselsan of Turkey. The system is fitted with 30mm Mk44 Bushmaster II auto-cannon. It is one of the Aselsan made RCWS along with the Aselsan SMASH 200/25.

== Overview ==
The weapon is mounted on a stabilized pedestal mounting which allows it to remain on target as the platform beneath it moves. The mounting does not penetrate the platform (except cables), making it relatively simple to fit the weapon to ships.

The electrooptical suit of SMASH 200/30 is independent and separately stabilized. This enables surveillance and target tracking without aiming the gun to the target. Using its sight, the SMASH 200/30 system can provide surveillance and target-tracking entirely without outside assistance, allowing it to function fully independently. It also can be integrated with the combat management system of a ship. Its integrated training simulator provides crew training. There is also a manual operation mode as a back-up.

150 (2 x 75) rounds are carried on the mounting with dual feed system. The mount can traverse 360° when EO sights elevate between -30° and +80° and gun elevate between -20° and +70°. The system can be used during day and night under various weather.

== Operators ==
Croatia

- Croatian Navy: Croatian Coast Guard division
  - Omiš-class patrol boat: Two inshore patrol boats Fitted with one Aselsan SMASH 200/30 as primary armament. Three more boats being built.

Indonesia

- Indonesian Maritime Security Agency
  - Tanjung Datu-class offshore patrol vessel: Fitted with one Aselsan SMASH 200/30 as primary armament.
  - Pulau Nipah-class offshore patrol vessel: Each of the three Pulau Nipah-class OPVs fitted with one Aselsan SMASH 200/30 as primary armament.
  - Bintang Laut-class patrol vessel: Four out of six Bintang Laut-class patrol vessel fitted with one Aselsan SMASH 200/30 as primary armament.

Malaysia

- Royal Malaysian Navy
  - Littoral Mission Ship Batch 2: To be installed on future LMS Batch 2.
- Malaysian Maritime Enforcement Agency
  - Tun Fatimah-class offshore patrol vessel: Each of the three Tun Fatimah-class OPVs will be fitted with one Aselsan SMASH 200/30 as primary armament.
  - Bagan Datuk-class patrol vessel: Each of the six Bagan Datuk-class PVs fitted with one Aselsan SMASH 200/30 as primary armament.

Pakistan

- Pakistan Navy
  - Yarmook-class corvette: Each vessel fitted with one Aselsan SMASH 200/30 and two Aselsan STAMP.

Philippines

- Philippine Navy
  - Jose Rizal-class frigate: Each of the two Jose Rizal-class frigates are fitted with one Aselsan SMASH 200/30 as secondary armament.
  - Rajah Sulayman-class offshore patrol vessel: Each of the six Rajah Sulayman-class offshore patrol vessels are fitted with two Aselsan SMASH 200/30 as secondary armament.
- Philippine Coast Guard
  - Teresa Magbanua-class patrol vessel: Aselsan has signed an agreement worth 6 million USD to arm the Philippine Coast Guard's Teresa Magbanua-class patrol vessels with the SMASH 200/30 30mm RCWS as its main armament.

== See also ==
- Aselsan STAMP
