= Destini =

Malaysian oil and gas industrial company

Destini Berhad
- Destini Berhad Logo
- Formerly: Satang Jaya
- Type: Public limited company
- Traded as: MYX: 7212
- ISIN: MYL7212OO003
- Industry: Heavy industry Defence; Oil and gas
- Founded: 1991; 35 years ago
- Headquarters: Shah Alam, Selangor, Malaysia
- Area served: Malaysia; United Kingdom; United Arab Emirates; Myanmar; Vietnam; Australia; China; Singapore
- Website: https://www.destinigroup.com/#

Destini Berhad is a Malaysian company that is involved in heavy industry, defence and oil and gas. This company was formed in 1991 under the name of Satang Jaya Sdn Bhd. At the beginning, this company involved in the business as a supplier of aviation tools and spare parts from Original Equipment Manufacturers (OEM) to Malaysian government especially for Malaysian Armed Forces. The company first time entry into Bursa Malaysia in December 2005 and in September 2011, Satang Jaya Sdn Bhd changed its name to Destini Berhad as a part of company expansions. Destiny Berhad consist of six divisions which is M Rails Technics, System Enhancement Resources & Technologies, Destini Prima, Destini Avia Technique, Destini Armada and Destini Oil Services.

== History ==
In May 1998, Destini Berhad awarded long-term contract to provide MRO services for Royal Malaysian Air Force (RMAF) equipment under the RMAF Contractorization Programme introduced by MINDEF in 1998. In December 2012, Destini Berhad acquired a 51% stake in Singapore-based Vanguard Composite Engineering Pte Ltd. This marked as the first time Destini Berhad enters in marine industry.

By February 2012, Destini Berhad enters in automotive industry by acquiring a 50% stake in automotive supply, fabrication and service company System Enhancement Resources & Technologies Sdn Bhd. With this acquisition, Destini Berhad has manufactured and supplied military and commercial vehicles for various government agencies.

Destini Berhad enters in oil and gas industry in March 2013 by purchasing the Samudra Oil Services Sdn Bhd in a contract value RM80 million. This company now known as Destini Oil Services. In June 2015 Destini Berhad enters into aerospace business by acquiring an 80% stake in Safeair Technical Sdn Bhd and also formed the joint venture with UK-based Avia Technique Limited.

In November 2015, Destini Berhad subsidiary, Destini Shipbuilding and Engineering awarded a contract to build six New Generation Patrol Craft (NGPC) namely Bagan Datuk-class patrol vessel for Malaysian Maritime Enforcement Agency (MMEA). In November 2016, Destini Berhad subsidiary Halaman Optima signed a deal to supply six MD-530G light attack helicopter for Malaysian Army. In January 2017, Destini Berhad joint venture with THHE has won a contract to build three Tun Fatimah-class offshore patrol vessel for MMEA.

== Divisions ==
=== M Rails Technics ===
Specialized in maintenance, repair and overhaul of electric trainsets. This division is joint venture with Keretapi Tanah Melayu Berhad.

=== System Enhancement Resources & Technologies ===
Known as SERT. This division incorporated in 2009. The main activities of this division is to fabricate, supply and maintenance, repair and overhaul of military and commercial vehicles for various government agencies and commercial markets. SERT also manufactured trollies, wagons and road rail vehicles for the rail sector.

=== Destini Prima ===
Provided maintenance, repair and overhaul and also related equipment to the Malaysian Armed Forces.

=== Destini Avia Technique ===
Joint venture between Destini Aviation and Avia Technique Limited from United Kingdom. Specialized repair, overhaul, design and manufacture of aerospace systems and components in aviation industry.

=== Destini Armada ===
Destini Armada focuses on marine and shipbuilding industry. The group of companies under this divisions includes Vanguarde and Techno Fibre Group.

=== Destini Oil Services ===
This fourth divisions is the oilfield service company that offers products and services in onshore and offshore exploration, development, production and workover programmes for the oil and gas sector. Besides that, Destini Oil Services also provided maintenance services to extend the life of producing wells.

== Products and services ==
=== Land systems ===
- Military land vehicle maintenance, repair, and overhaul
- Destini Trucks
- Transportable Expandable Cabin
- GIRN Vehicle
- Motor trolley
- Bogie Rail Wagon
- Bogie Ballast Hopper
- Road Rail Vehicle
- Knuckle Coupler

=== Aerospace ===
- Aircraft maintenance, repair, and overhaul

=== Marine ===
- Vanguarde's Lifeboats
- Vanguarde's Davit Systems
- Vanguarde's twin cylinder, V type 4-stroke diesel outboard engine
- Marine Fire Fighting Equipment's
- Lifeboat Cylinders, Immersion Suits, Life Jackets
- Fire Extinguishers, Fire Alarm System
- Marine Gas Detection System
- Fire Hoses, Couplings, Nozzels
- Hydrant Valves, Rope Ladders
- Marine Safety Equipment Supply
- Atrai-class harbour patrol boat
- Pengalang-class boat
- Bagan Datuk-class patrol vessel
- Tun Fatimah-class offshore patrol vessel

=== Oil and gas ===
- Onshore and Offshore service, exploration, development and production for the oil and gas sector
