= Bagan Datuk-class patrol vessel =

Malaysia Coast Guard ships

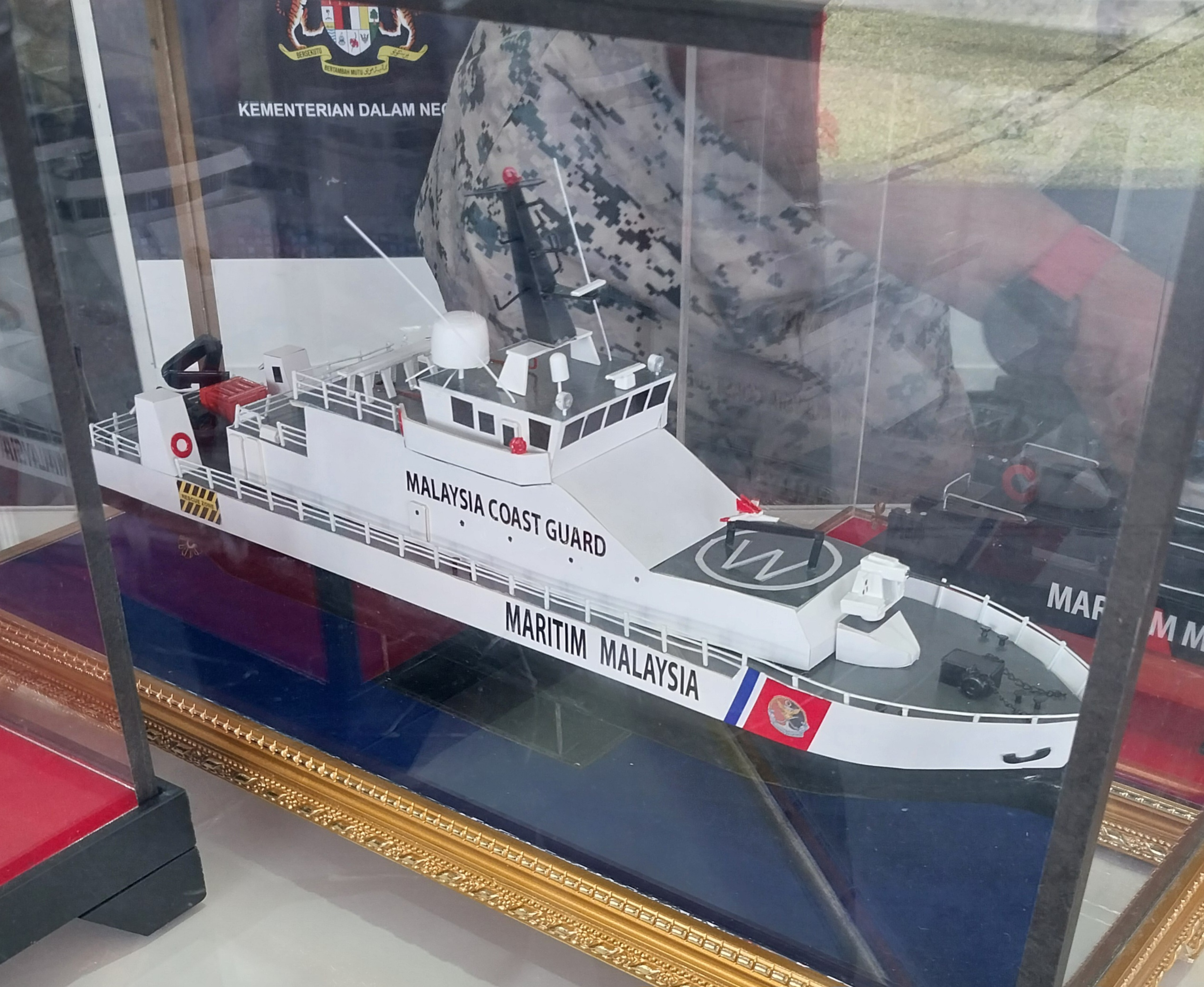
- Scale model of Bagan Datuk-class patrol vessel on display

Class overview
- Name: Bagan Datuk class
- Builders: Destini Berhad Malaysia; Fassmer Germany
- Operators: Malaysian Maritime Enforcement Agency
- Planned: 6
- Completed: 6
- Active: 6

General characteristics
- Type: Patrol vessel
- Displacement: 300 tonnes
- Length: 45 m (148 ft)
- Beam: 7.7 m (25 ft)
- Draught: 1.95 m (6.4 ft)
- Propulsion: 2 × 1,920 kW (2,570 hp) MTU engines
- Speed: 24.0 knots (44.4 km/h; 27.6 mph)
- Complement: 41
- Armament: 1 × 30 mm (1.2 in) Aselsan SMASH 200/30 RCWS; 1-2 × 12.7 mm general purpose machine guns
- Aircraft carried: 1 × Aerovision Fulmar UAV

The Bagan Datuk class are a series of patrol vessels of the Malaysia Coast Guard. The class comprises six 45-metre (148 ft) vessels built by the Malaysian company Destini Berhad, based on Germany's Fassmer design. The class is also known as the New Generation Patrol Craft (NGPC) and the class named after the first ship of the class, KM Bagan Datuk.

== Development ==
In the 2015 Malaysian budget presentation, Prime Minister Najib Tun Razak allocated RM393 million to purchase six new patrol vessels. The contract for the six ships was awarded to the Malaysian company Destini Berhad in November 2015 and all the ships were completed by late 2018.

== Ships of the class ==
Pennant	Name	Builder	Commissioned	MMEA Maritime Region	Status
4541	KM Bagan Datuk	Destini Berhad	15 March 2017	Southern Peninsular Maritime Region	Active
4542	KM Sri Aman	Destini Berhad	4 December 2017	Sarawak Maritime Region	Active
4543	KM Kota Belud	Destini Berhad	4 December 2017	Sabah Maritime Region	Active
4544	KM Tok Bali	Destini Berhad	6 July 2020	Eastern Peninsular Maritime Region	Active
4545	KM Kota Kinabalu	Destini Berhad	6 July 2020	Sarawak Maritime Region	Active
4546	KM Lahad Datu	Destini Berhad	30 September 2021	Sabah Maritime Region	Active
