= Thales Fulmar =

Fulmar
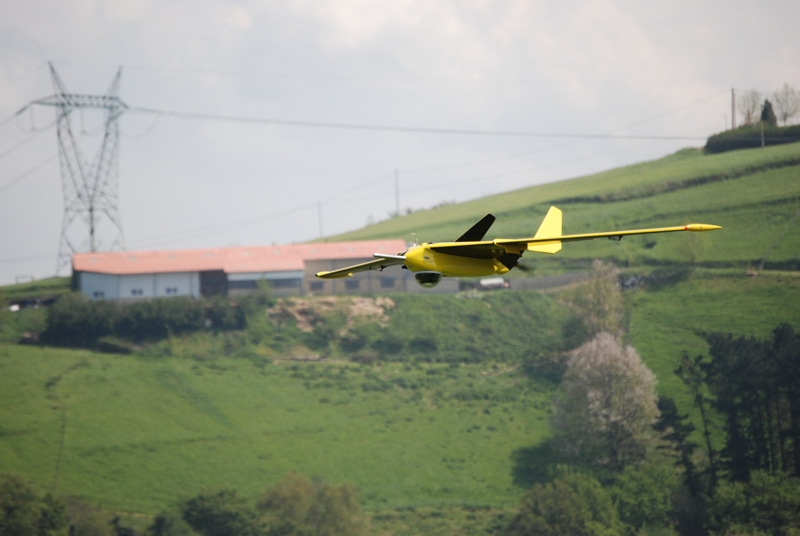
- Fulmar in flight

General information
- Type: Fishery reconnaissance UAV, maritime surveillance
- National origin: Spain
- Manufacturer: Thales Spain
- Status: In service
- Primary user: Spain; Malaysia

The UAV Fulmar is a privately developed unmanned aerial vehicle system, its main application being to aid fishermen finding tuna banks, due to its ability to perform sea-landing.

An alternative version exists, which can be operated from ground. It is launched by means of a catapult and recovered by a net, easing operation and reducing costs.

== Operators ==
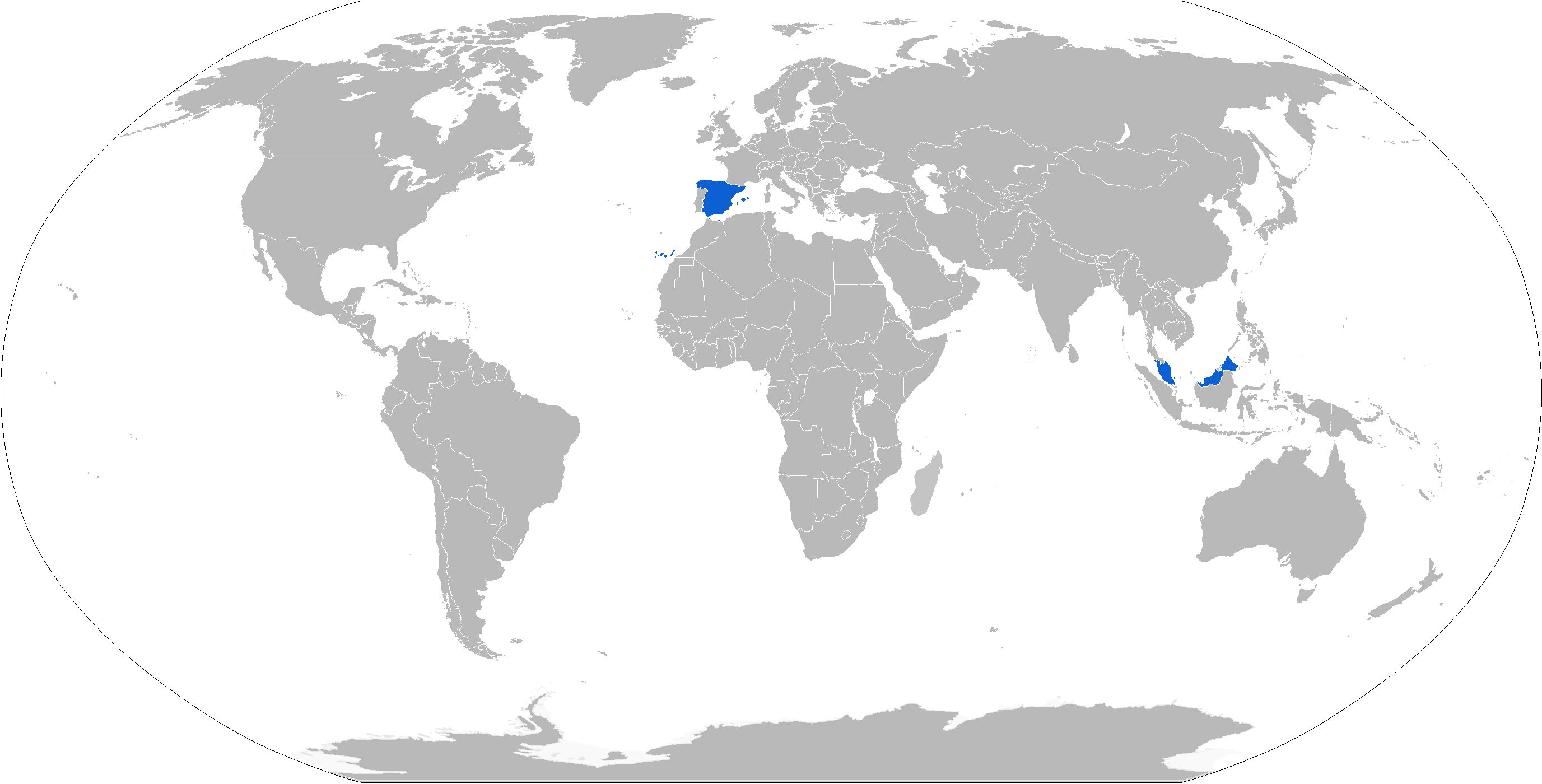
Map with military Aerovision Fulmar operators in blue

- Spain
- Malaysia
