= Malaysian Armed Forces =

Combined military forces of Malaysia

- Angkatan Tentera Malaysia اڠكتن تنترا مليسيا
- Crest of the Armed Forces

- Flag of the Armed Forces
- Founded: 1 March 1933; 93 years ago
- Service branches: Malaysian Army; Royal Malaysian Navy; Royal Malaysian Air Force
- Headquarters: Wisma Pertahanan, Kuala Lumpur
- Website: mafhq.mil.my

Leadership
- Supreme Commander: Yang di-Pertuan Agong, Sultan Ibrahim
- Prime Minister: (Malaysia) Anwar Ibrahim
- Minister of Defence: (Malaysia) Mohamed Khaled Nordin
- Chief of Defence Forces: General Datuk Malek Razak Sulaiman

Personnel
- Military age: 18
- Active personnel: 113,000
- Reserve personnel: 51,600

Expenditure
- Budget: RM21.2 billion (US$4.78 billion) (FY2025)

Industry
- Domestic suppliers: List: DefTech; Mildef International Technologies; Weststar Defence Industries; Cendana Auto; Advanced Defence Systems; Sapura; Mindmatics; Ikramatic Systems; System Consultancy Services; AMP Corporation; Zetro Aerospace and Defence; Boustead Heavy Industries Corporation; Lumut Naval Shipyard; Destini; Gading Marine; Labuan Shipyard and Engineering; Malaysia Marine and Heavy Engineering; Shin Yang; Grade One Marine Shipyard; Geliga Slipway; AIROD; ATSC; CTRM; SME Aerospace; Galaxy Aerospace; G7 Aerospace; Global Turbine Asia; SME Ordnance; Ketech Asia
- Foreign suppliers: List: Australia; Brazil; Canada; China; European Union; Indonesia; Japan; Norway; Pakistan; Russia; South Africa; South Korea; Switzerland; Thailand; Turkey; United Arab Emirates; United Kingdom; United States

Related articles
- History: Military history of Malaysia
- Ranks: Military ranks of Malaysia

The Malaysian Armed Forces (Abbr.: MAF; Malay: Angkatan Tentera Malaysia; Jawi: اڠكتن تنترا مليسيا) are the armed forces of Malaysia, consists of three branches; the Malaysian Army, Royal Malaysian Navy and the Royal Malaysian Air Force. The number of MAF active personnel is 113,000 along with reserve forces at 51,600.

The Supreme Commander of the Malaysian Armed Forces is the Yang di-Pertuan Agong; the King of Malaysia.

== Background ==
Malaysia's armed forces were created from the unification of military forces which arose during the first half of the 20th century when Malaya and Singapore were the subjects of British colonial rule, before Malaya achieved independence in 1957. The primary objective of the armed forces in Malaysia is to defend the country's sovereignty and protect it from any and all types of threats.

It is responsible for assisting civilian authorities to overcome all international threats, preserve public order, assist in natural disasters and participate in national development programs. It is also sustaining and upgrading its capabilities in the international sphere to uphold the national foreign policy of being involved under the guidance of the United Nations (UN).

== Theater of operation ==
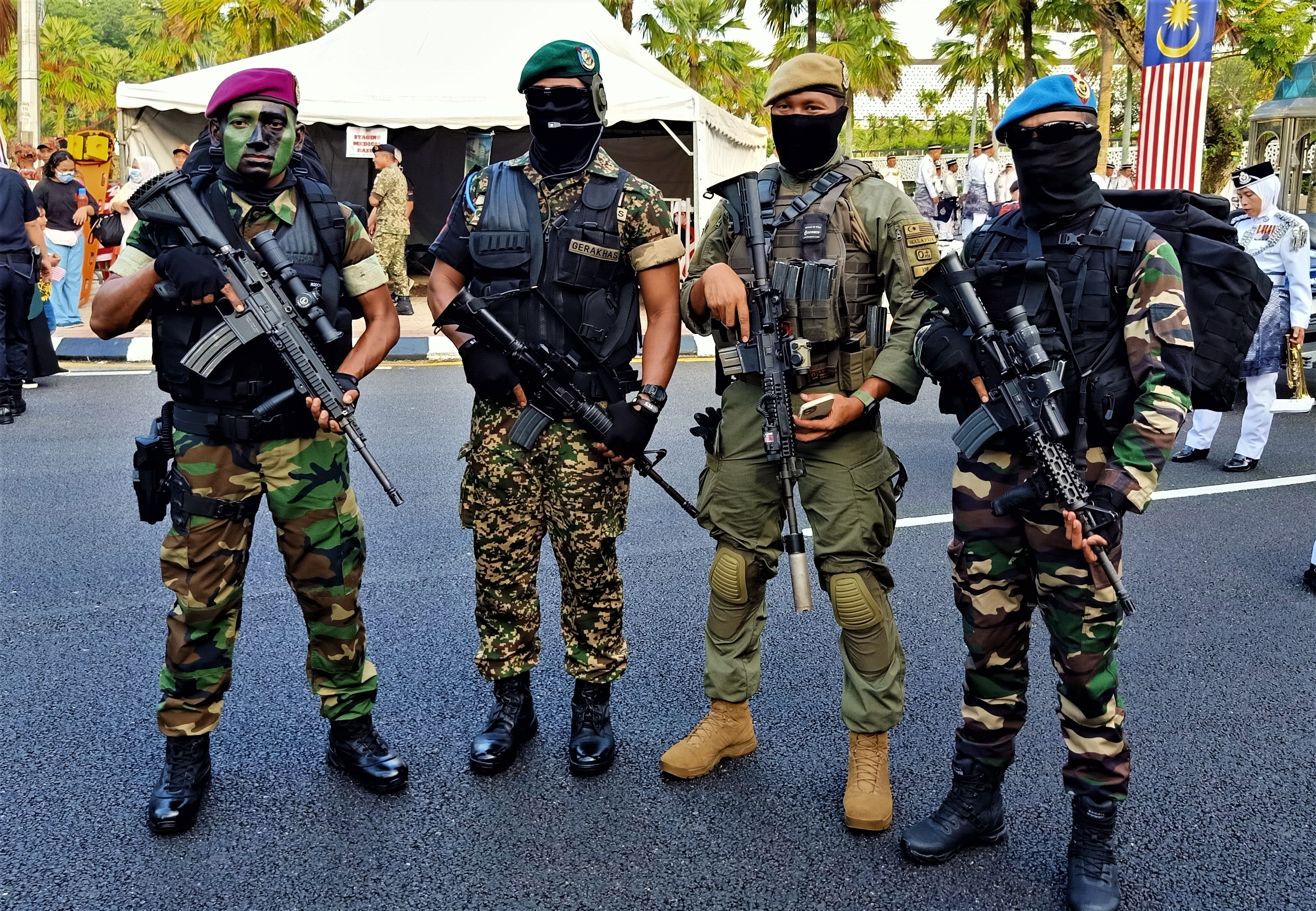
Operatives of PASKAL, GGK, 69 Commando and PASKAU during the 65th Merdeka Day in Kuala Lumpur.

The main theaters of operations were within Malaysian borders, primarily to fight an insurgency led by the Communist Party of Malaya (CPM) in what was known as the Emergency. The only foreign incursion of Malaysian territory in modern times were in World War II by Japan (Malaya was then not a unified political entity and consisted of the British Crown Colony of the Straits Settlements, and the British protected Federated Malay States and Unfederated Malay States) and during the Indonesia-Malaysia confrontation by Indonesia under the leadership of President Sukarno. Operations on foreign soil have mainly been peacekeeping operations under the auspices of the United Nations.

- First emergency (1948–1960)
  An insurrection and guerrilla war with the Malayan National Liberation Army organised by the CPM against the British and Malayan administration.
- Moro attacks on Malaysia (Part of the piracy in the Sulu Sea) (1962–present)
- Congo peacekeeping mission (1960–1962)
  A contingent of 1,947 personnel were dispatched as part of the United Nations Operation in the Congo or ONUC. This contingent was known as the Malayan Special Force to the Congo and their experiences there were later recounted through the drawings of the cartoonist, Rejabhad.
- Sarawak communist insurgency (1963–1990)
  An insurrection and guerrilla war of the Sarawak Communist Organisation (from 1971, the North Kalimantan Communist Party or NKCP) against the British and Malaysian governments to establish an independent nation comprising the states of Sabah, Sarawak and Brunei. The insurgency ended when the NKCP signed a peace treaty with the Malaysian government in 1990.
- Indonesia-Malaysia confrontation (1963–1966)
  An intermittent armed conflict between Malaysia and Indonesia with skirmishes mainly occurring in Sarawak and Sabah in the island of Borneo. In 1964, armed raids were made on Peninsular Malaysia. Combat eased with the deposing of Indonesia's President Sukarno in 1965 by the Indonesian army and the conflict was declared over by both sides in 1966.
- Communist insurgency in Malaysia (1968–1989)
  A low level resurgence of insurgent activity by the armed elements of the CPM from sanctuaries in the Malaysian-Thai border. The insurgency was only ended after the CPM signed a peace treaty with the Governments of Malaysia and Thailand on 2 December 1989.
- Iran/Iraq border (1988–1991)
  Participated as part of the UN Iran-Iraq Military Observer Group (UNIIMOG) to supervise the Iran–Iraq War ceasefire.
- Namibia (1989–1990)
  Contributed a battalion to the UN Transition Assistance Group (UNTAG) to supervise Namibia's elections and transition to independence.
- Western Sahara (1991–present)
  A contingent of observers under the Mission for the Referendum in Western Sahara (MINURSO) to help implement a ceasefire between the Polisario Front & Morocco and help promote a referendum on the area's future.
- Angola (1991–1995)
  A contingent was sent under the United Nations Angola Verification Mission II (UNAVEM II) to enforce the ceasefire in the Angolan civil war.
- Iraq/Kuwait border (1992–2003)
  A contingent was sent under the United Nations Iraq-Kuwait Observation Mission (UNIKOM) to monitor the demilitarised zone along the Iraq-Kuwait border, deter border violations and report on any hostile action.
- Cambodia (1992–1993)
  An observer team was sent under the United Nations Transitional Authority in Cambodia (UNTAC) to aid in the administration of Cambodia and to organise and run elections.
- Bosnia and Herzegovina (1993–1998)
  A peacekeeping contingent known as MALBATT Command (Malaysia Battalion) was sent initially under the United Nations Protection Force (UNPROFOR) from 1993 to 1995 with deployments at Konjic, Jablanica and Pazarić in Hadžići. Following the Dayton Agreement, forces were redeployed as MALCON Command (Malaysia Contingent) under the NATO led Implementation Force (IFOR) in Operation Joint Endeavor with deployments at Livno, Glamoč and Kupres. MALCON further participated as part of the NATO led Stabilisation Force (SFOR) until 1998. Up to 8,000 troops were eventually deployed in this theatre of operations.
- Liberia (1993–1997)
  An observer team of 3 officers was sent under the United Nations Observer Mission in Liberia (UNOMIL) to support the efforts of the Economic Community of West African States (ECOWAS) and the Liberian National Transitional Government to implement peace agreements signed between the warring parties in Liberia.
- Somalia (1993–1994)
  A contingent known as MALBATT was sent under the United Nations Operation in Somalia II (UNOSOM II) to take appropriate action, including enforcement measures, to establish throughout Somalia a secure environment for humanitarian assistance. During its deployment, MALBATT was involved in the Battle of Mogadishu which saw 1 personnel killed in action and 7 others wounded in action during the relief operations to aid the surrounded troops of the United States' Task Force Ranger. On 18 January 1994, Lieutenant General Abu Samah Bin Abu Bakar was appointed the Commander of UNOSOM II forces. His appointment also saw the United Nations revise the mandate of UNOSOM II to stop using "coercive methods" in the discharge of their duties while retaining "some capability to defend its personnel if circumstances so warrant.
- Mozambique (1993–1995)
- A team of observers were sent under the United Nations Operations in Mozambique (ONUMOZ).
- Lahad Datu standoff (2013)
- Deployed in South Lebanon in a peacekeeping role at present after the withdrawal of Israeli military forces in early 2007 (Invasion of South Lebanon by Israeli Military). The unit also consists of the 21st Special Service Group, the Naval Special Forces, the RMAF Special Forces and the 10th Parachute Brigade elements.
- Deployed a contingent called Malaysian Medical Team (MASMEDTIM) to Chaman, Pakistan to treat refugees from Afghanistan during the US invasion of Afghanistan in 2001.
- Deployed approximately a brigade-sized force on islands surrounding Sabah waters in Ops Pasir to prevent the recurrence of 2000 Sipadan kidnappings.
- Deployed a contingent to Aceh after the tsunami disaster in 2004.
- Deployed MASMEDTIM to Pakistan during the 2005 quake.
- Deployed in Southern Philippines as a part of monitoring force agreed upon by both the Philippine Government and Moro Islamic Liberation Front (MILF).
- Deployed in East Timor/East Leste together with Australian, Portuguese and New Zealand forces at the request of East Timor Government. The first team of 25 soldiers from 10 Para Brigade, Royal Intelligence Corp and Commando Regiment were deployed on a fact-finding mission before being reinforced by another 209 soldiers as at 27 May 2006.

Other limited participation under UNPKO are United Nations International Police Force (UNIPTF) since December 1995; United Nations Mission in Kosovo (UNMIK) since June 1999; United Nations Observer Mission in Sierra Leone (UNAMSIL) since October 1999; United Nations Transitional Administration in East Timor (UNTAET) since September 1999 and United Nations Organisation Mission in Democratic Republic of Congo (MONUC) since February 2000. 18 Malaysian Armed Forces personnel have been killed during UN peacekeeping operations.

== Present development ==
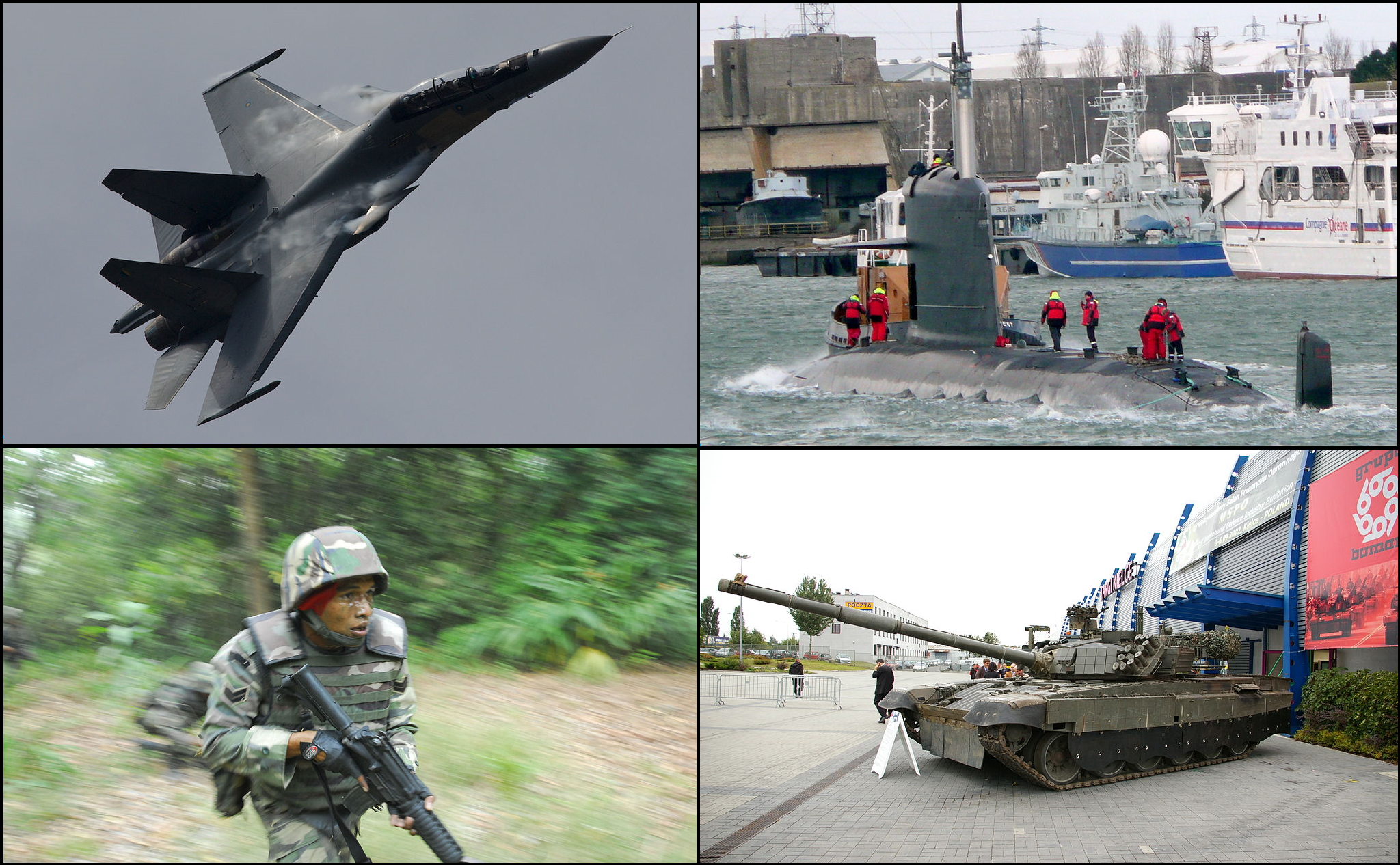
An examples of Malaysian Armed Forces main weaponry assets. Clockwise from top right: Scorpène-class submarine, PT-91M MBT, Malaysian Army paratrooper with M4A1, and Su-30MKM fighter aircraft.

Malaysian defence requirements are assigned to the Malaysian Armed Forces (Angkatan Tentera Malaysia – ATM). The armed forces has three branches, the Malaysian Army (Tentera Darat Malaysia – TDM), Royal Malaysian Navy (Tentera Laut Diraja Malaysia – TLDM) and the Royal Malaysian Air Force (Tentera Udara Diraja Malaysia – TUDM). Malaysia does not have conscription, and the required minimum age for voluntary military service is 18.

In the early 1990s, Malaysia undertook a major program to expand and modernise its armed forces. However, budgetary constraints imposed by the 1997 Asian financial crisis held back many of its procurements. The recent economic recovery may lead to a relaxation of budgetary constraints and a resumption of major weapons purchases. In October 2000, the Defence Minister also announced a review of national defence and security policy to bring it up to date. The review addressed new security threats that have emerged in the form of low intensity conflicts, such as the kidnapping of Malaysians and foreigners from resort islands located off the east coast of the state of Sabah and the rising risk of territory disputes with several neighbouring countries. Currently, 1.4% of Malaysia's GDP is spent on the military, and employing 1.23% of Malaysia's manpower.

=== Malaysian Army ===
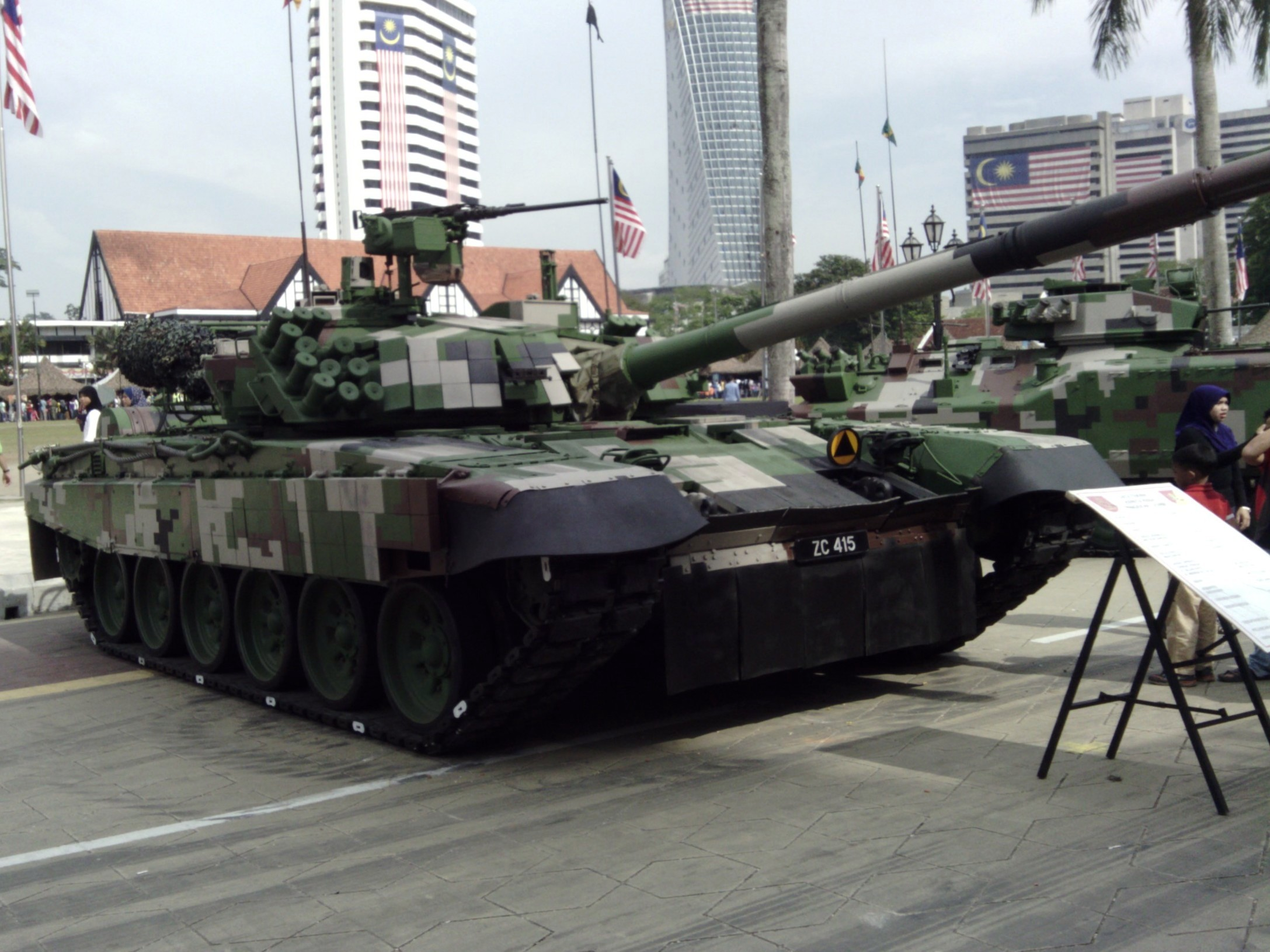
PT-91M Pendekar MBT of Malaysian Army.

Since the recovery from the 1997 economic crisis, the army's modernisation program has gained momentum. The acquisition of Main Battle Tanks (MBT), Armoured Personnel Carriers (APC), Infantry Fighting Vehicles (IFV) and modern artillery make the Malaysian Army one of the most potent powers in the region.

=== Royal Malaysian Navy ===
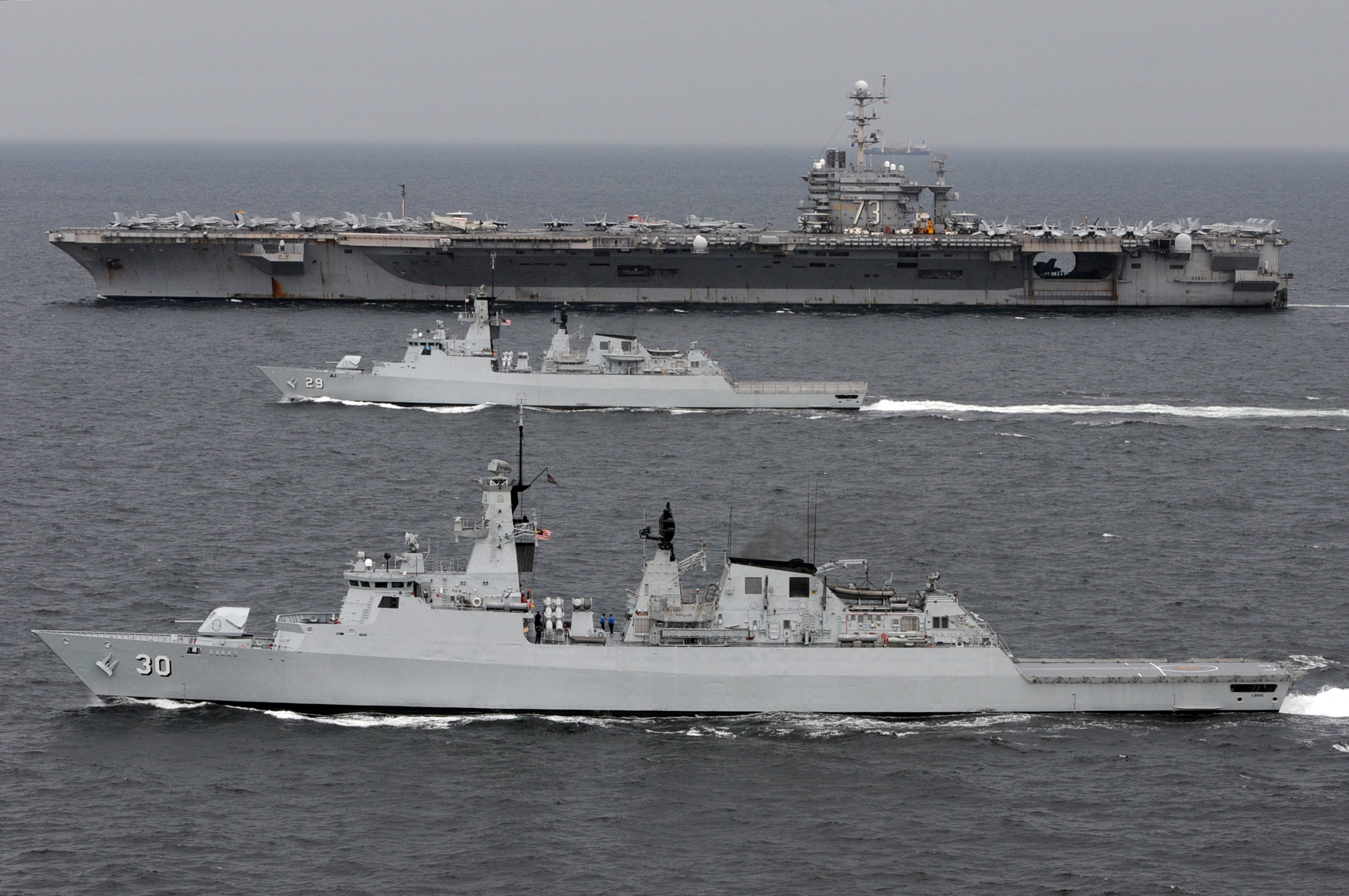
Lekiu-class frigate of RMN.

Following the completion of the New Generation Patrol Vessel (NGPV) program, RMN has moved on to its next program called the Second Generation Patrol Vessel (SGPV). RMN is also looking to purchase more submarines as well as a batch of Littoral Mission Ships (LMS) namely Keris-class littoral mission ship and Littoral Mission Ship Batch 2. RMN also planned to add Multi Role Support Ship (MRSS) for its support role. In addition to this, an upgrade program called Service Life Extension Program (SLEP) for the aging ships will keep the fleet modern with the latest technologies needed.

=== Royal Malaysian Air Force ===
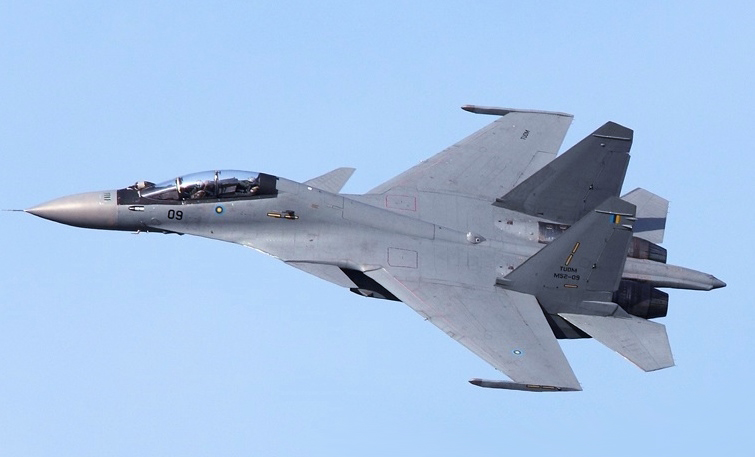
Sukhoi Su-30MKM of RMAF.

The Royal Malaysian Air Force (RMAF) has historically sourced most of its aircraft from Western suppliers, particularly the United States and Europe. Restrictions on the transfer of advanced technology to the region by the United States, however, led Malaysia to diversify its procurement to include Russia and other non-traditional suppliers. As a result, the RMAF currently operates a mixed fleet of American, European (including Turkish), and Russian aircraft.

As of 2025, Malaysia is seeking to expand its fighter aircraft fleet. Plans were made to acquire second-hand F/A-18 Hornets from the Kuwait Air Force, a purchase which received approval from the United States. However, delays in the process prompted Malaysian defence authorities to reconsider the acquisition and instead explore the possibility of procuring fifth-generation fighter aircraft. Malaysia has expressed interest in fifth-generation platforms offered by European, Russian, and American manufacturers, with the procurement process expected to commence in the near future. The RMAF's long-term objective is to fully replace its ageing fleet by 2040.

=== Formation of a Marine Corps ===
On 10 October 2013, the Minister of Defence, Hishammuddin Hussein, announced plans to establish a marine corps to conduct amphibious operations. The proposed formation was intended to draw personnel from all three branches of the Malaysian Armed Forces, with the core element expected to come from one of the three parachute battalions of the 10th Parachute Brigade (10 PARA BDE), which would have been re-designated as a marine battalion. Both the 9th Battalion Royal Malay Regiment (Parachute) and the 8th Battalion Royal Ranger Regiment (Parachute) had previously undertaken amphibious warfare training as a secondary role, including participation in the Cooperation Afloat Readiness and Training (CARAT) exercises with the United States Marine Corps and other joint amphibious exercises with foreign armed forces.

As of 2025, the plan was most probably scrapped as the absence of marine unit was filled by the 10 PARA BDE. In December 2024, around 130 personnel from the brigade were retrained as trainers/instructors in amphibious warfare to trained future brigade's candidates in amphibious warfare.

== Defence industry ==
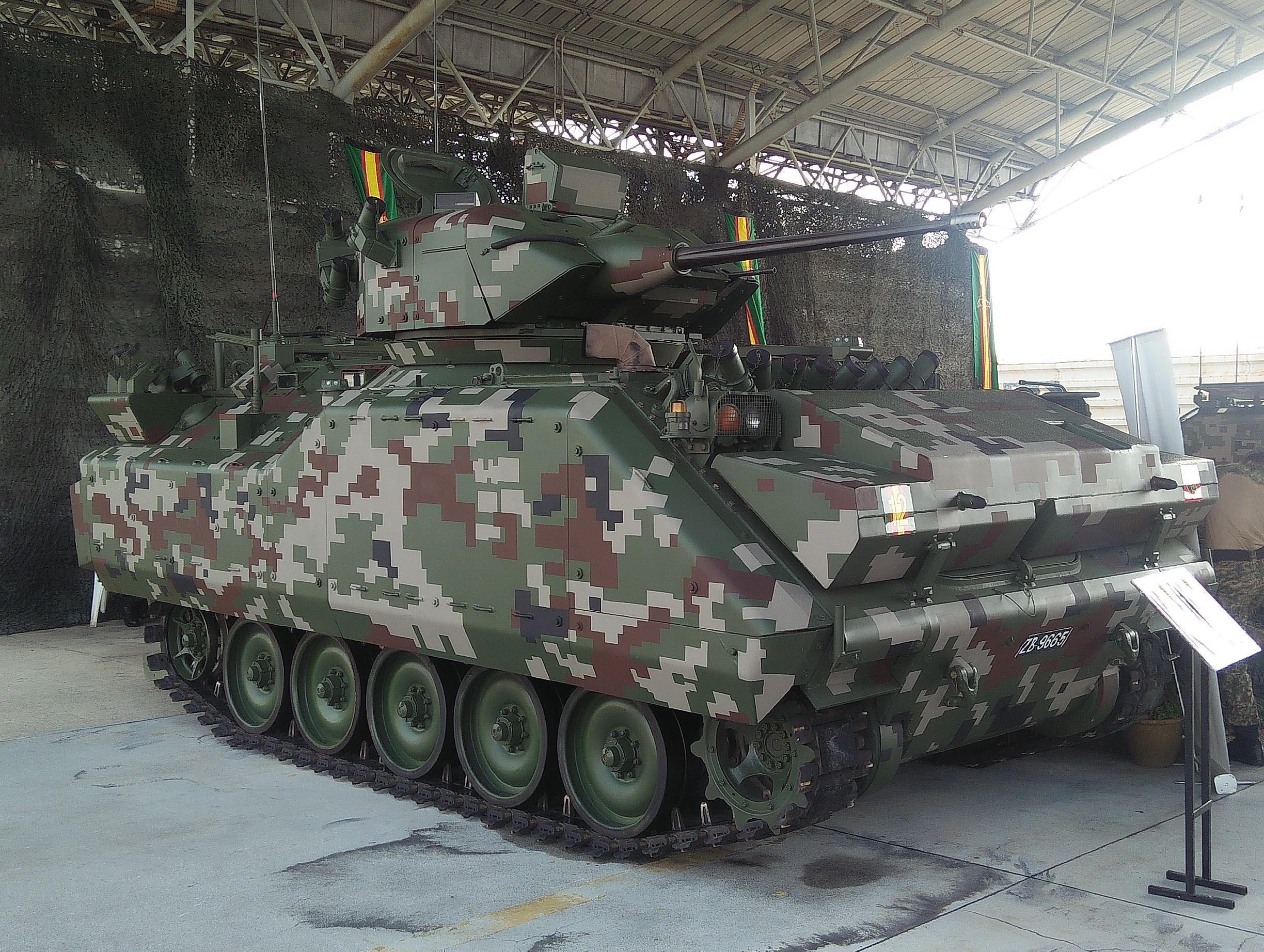
ACV-300 Adnan infantry fighting vehicle.

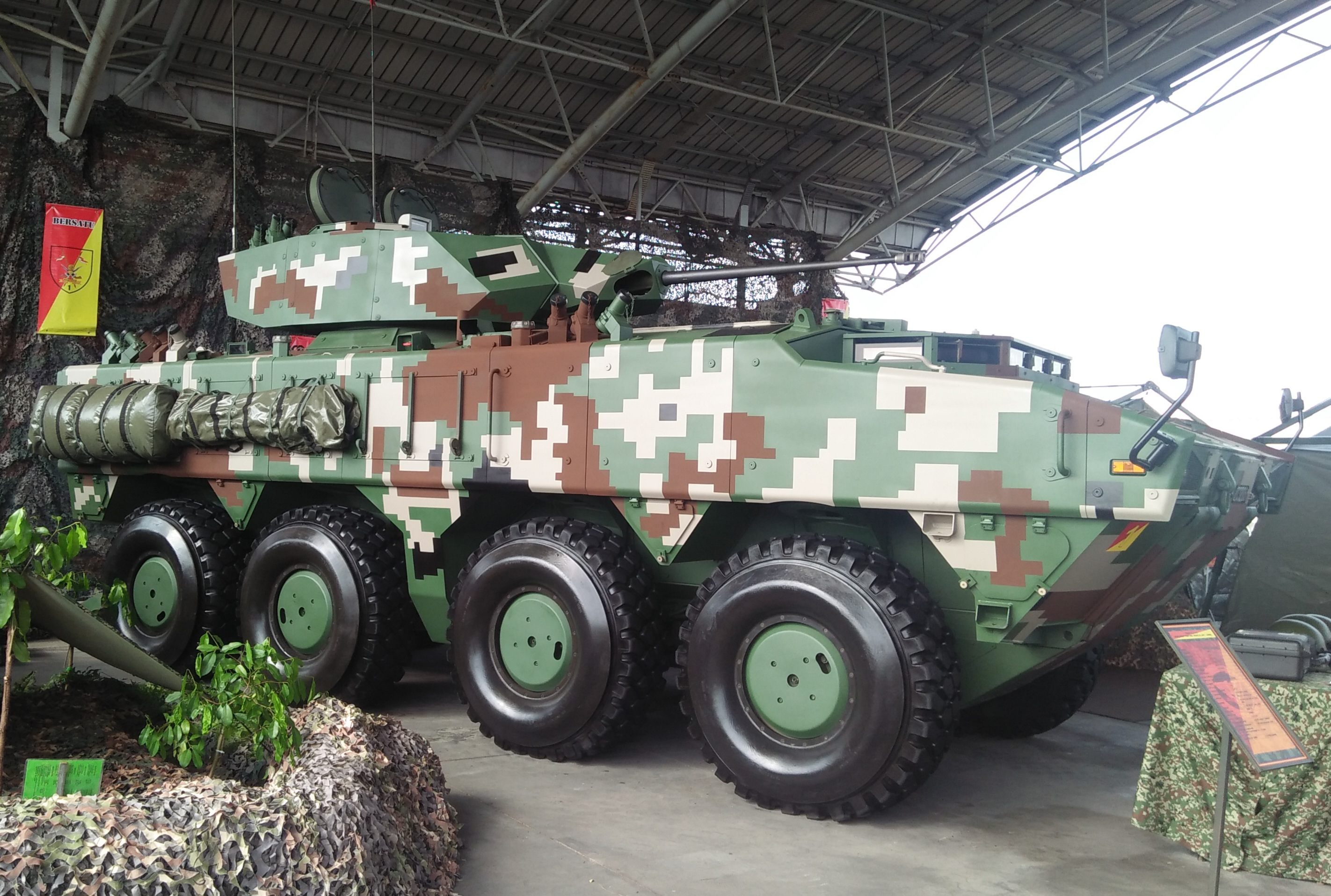
AV-8 Gempita armoured fighting vehicle.

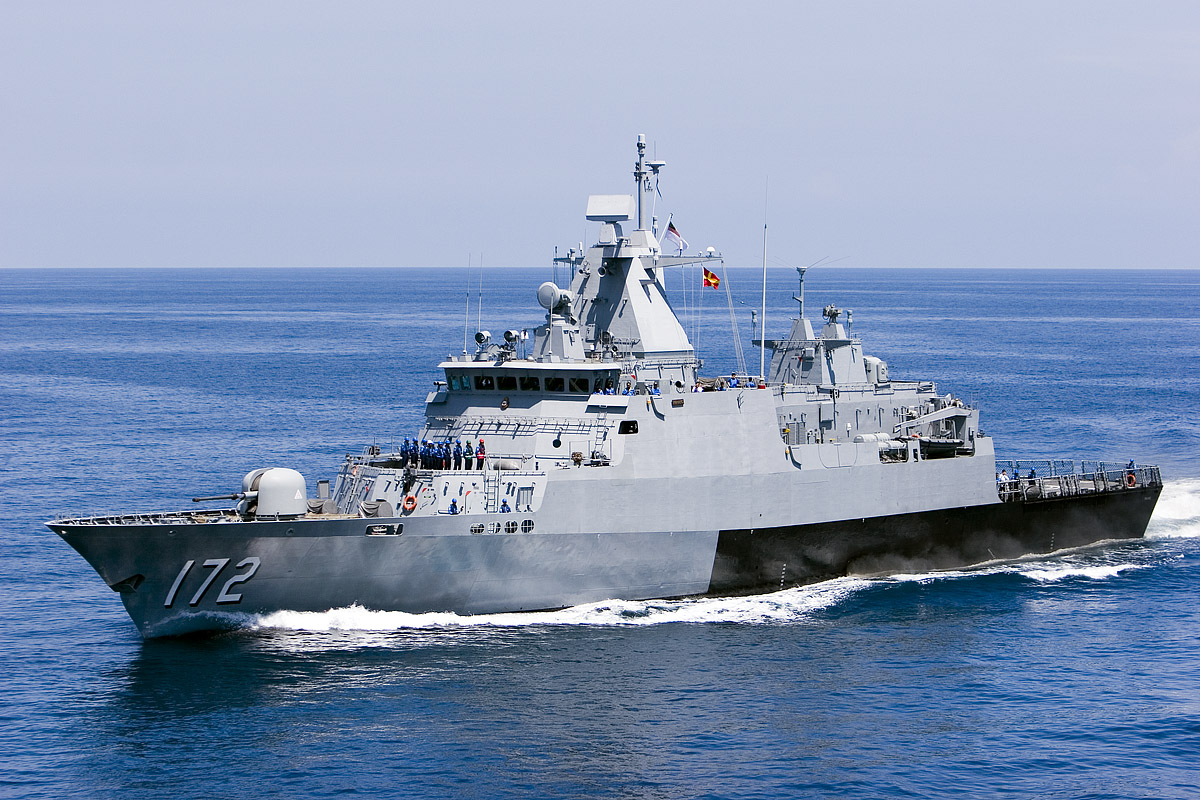
Kedah-class offshore patrol vessel.

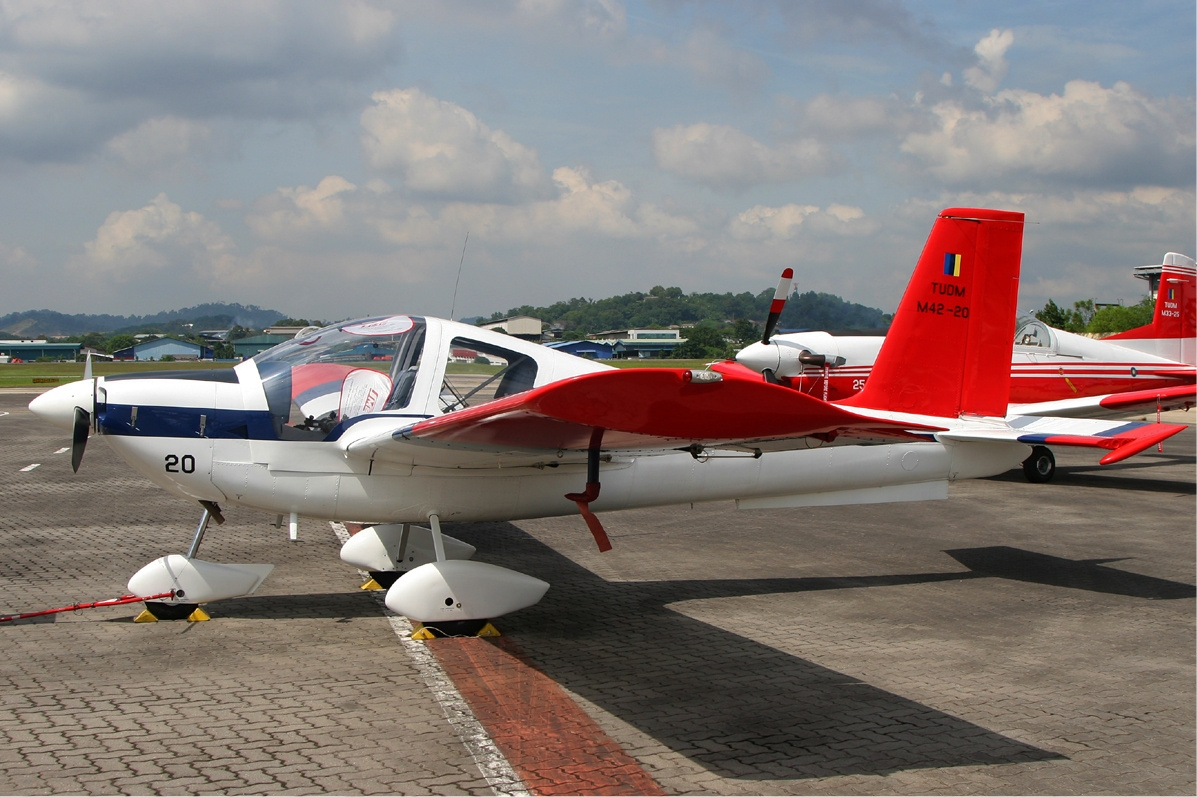
SME Aero Tiga light aircraft.

After independence, Malaysia moved forward by establishing and developing its own defence industry. Malaysia has improved its defence industry through its defence companies by locally manufacturing and producing weapons, such as ammunition, rifles, armoured cars, warships and light aircraft including unmanned aerial vehicles for the armed forces. DefTech, Mildef International Technologies, Weststar Defence Industries, Cendana Auto and Advanced Defence Systems are among the local companies that emphasize on the maintenance and manufacturing of military land vehicles and the automotive sector. While the Sapura, Mindmatics, Ikramatic Systems, System Consultancy Services, AMP Corporation and Zetro Aerospace and Defence focuses more on military electronics and systems integration such as; communication systems, tactical systems, command and control systems, training and simulation systems and surveillance systems. Following the Malaysia's National Defence Policy, Malaysian Armed Forces has adopted locally made weapons such as DefTech ACV-300 Adnan, DefTech AV-8 Gempita, DefTech AV-4 Lipanbara, Weststar GK-M1/M2 and Handalan. In January 2021, Mildef International Technologies has launched its new Mildef Tarantula HMAV intended for the local market and export. At the Defence Services Asia (DSA) 2022, Mildef International Technologies has launched its second armoured vehicle called Mildef Rentaka. The third armoured vehicle called Mildef Ribat HMLTV was launched at the Defence Services Asia (DSA) 2024. Another local company, Cendana Auto also introduced its new Cendana Auto 4x4 and Cendana Auto Magatti which is ready to deliver to the Malaysian Army.

As a country with vast maritime area, Malaysia has long had a great shipbuilding industry since the Malacca Sultanate. During which, the country had been the main shipbuilders in the region. Nowadays, Malaysia houses many shipbuilding companies, giving its reputation as a country with great maritime expertise and facilities. Through local companies such as Boustead Heavy Industries Corporation, Lumut Naval Shipyard, Destini and Gading Marine, Malaysia was able to locally build their own major surface combatants and combat boats such as Maharaja Lela-class frigate, Kedah-class offshore patrol vessel, Jerung-class gunboat, Gagah Samudera-class training ship, Sri Tiga-class fast troop vessel, Gading Marine G2000-18m class combat boat and Sandakan Jaya Teknik-class boat. In addition to this, local companies such as Labuan Shipyard and Engineering, Malaysia Marine and Heavy Engineering, Shin Yang, Grade One Marine Shipyard and Geliga Slipway were also able to execute minor and major maintenance and overhaul to the naval grade vessels locally, without needing to send them abroad. Some of these great achievements were put on display when Malaysia succeeded in completing major overhaul of its Scorpene-class submarines. The upgrade program was done locally by BHIC Submarine Engineering Services and Boustead DCNS Naval Corporation at the RMN submarine base in Labuan, Sabah. Malaysia also already exports their naval vessels to foreign navies and security agencies such as the Shin Yang-made Al-Quwaisat-class LST to the United Arab Emirates navy, Northern Shipyard / KN Aluminium & Engineering-made P38 Sea Eagles patrol craft and Manta MkII-class fast interdiction combat boat to the Nigerian navy and Destini-made 18 meter harbour patrol boat and 20 meter fast interceptor craft to the Bangladesh Coast Guard and Indian Customs respectively.

In aerospace sector, Malaysia is one of the aerospace hubs in the region. Since 1990, Malaysia has witness a growing in aerospace industry when received a lot of foreign direct investment from major foreign aerospace players. In 1998, Boeing enters Malaysia aerospace industry by acquired 50% stake in Aerospace Composites Malaysia and set up the plant in Bukit Kayu Hitam, Kedah. In 2024, Boeing relaunches this manufacturing facility as Boeing Composites Malaysia. Another major foreign aerospace company namely Spirit AeroSystems and Collins Aerospace has set up their plant in Subang while Honeywell Aerospace Technologies has set up their plant in Penang respectively. Airbus and BAE Systems invested in Malaysian aerospace industry by outsourcing theirs aerostructures components from Malaysian companies. Since 1990s, Malaysia, through SME Aerospace and CTRM has been manufacturing aircraft components such as wing parts, nacelles, composites structures and helicopter parts for the Airbus. These include parts for the A320, A330, A350, A380, A400 and Airbus helicopters. Other than that, SME Aerospace also manufactures pylons for the BAE Systems Hawk AJT for worldwide customers. Although Malaysia does not build major aircraft locally or through any partnerships, Malaysia already has experience in building light aircraft such as the SME Aero Tiga and CTRM Eagle Aircraft Eagle 150. In addition to this, CTRM also built their indigenous unmanned aerial vehicle called the CTRM Aludra. In 2005, UPECA Aerotech joined the club by manufacturing and supplying aircraft components for both Boeing and Airbus. In 2021, Turkish Aerospace Industries open its engineering and design centre in Malaysia to train local engineer and share its technologies in local defence industry and aviation fields. Besides aerostructures manufacturing, Malaysia also expand its MRO market share. AIROD is one of the only companies to have received a certificate from the United States (US) based defence company, Lockheed Martin as a C-130 MRO centre outside the US. In 2015, the United States Marine Corps awarded AIROD for MRO operations on its 13 units of C-130 aircraft that were based in Japan. Besides the C-130, AIROD also had an expertise in servicing other types of commercial and military aircraft and had served other customers across the region. Like AIROD, another local aerospace company named ATSC has also played an important role in the aerospace industry in Malaysia. This company focuses more on MRO services for Russian-built aircraft such as the Sukhoi Su-30, MiG-29 and Mil Mi-17. In 2017, ATSC was awarded a contract to do a major overhaul and upgrade on the RMAF Sukhoi Su-30 MKM fleet. For other local aerospace players, BHIC AeroServices, UMW Aerospace, UMW Aero Assets, Destini Prima, Destini Avia Technique, Galaxy Aerospace, G7 Aerospace and Global Turbine Asia is some of the local company that contributed to the MRO segments.

In 1969, Malaysia set up a firearms manufacturing company, SME Ordnance to supply the local armed forces. Starting out by manufacturing ammunition locally, SME Ordnance moved on to also manufacture advanced high-tech firearms. By 1991, SME Ordnance had acquired a licence to manufacture the Austrian-made Steyr AUG rifles locally. In 2001, SME Ordnance moved on to acquire a licence to locally manufacture the US-made M4 Carbine assault rifle. Both locally manufactured Steyr AUG and M4 assault rifles are currently used by the Malaysian Armed Forces and other government agencies. Additionally, SME Ordnance also provides a wide range of NATO standard munitions, including 5.56 mm to 155 mm calibre ammunition, mines, explosions and rockets. Another local firearms company; Aegis Malinnov also developed indigenous pistols called the Malinnov M1P intended to be used by Malaysian government agencies. In conjunction of LIMA 2023, the Edge Group in United Arab Emirates had signed an agreement with Malaysian-company Ketech Asia for the production of CARACAL firearms locally through the transfer of technology.

Malaysia also has its own defence technology research statutory board. The Science Technology Research Institute for Defence (STRIDE) is the statutory board under the Ministry of Defence (Malaysia) and is responsible for performing research and development related to defence technologies for the Malaysian Ministry of Defence and Malaysian Armed Forces.

== International action ==
The Five Power Defence Arrangement (FPDA) between Malaysia, Singapore, Australia, New Zealand and the United Kingdom is a regional security initiative which has been in place for more than 45 years. It involves joint military exercises held between the five countries.

Malaysia also actively takes part in international exercises such as CARAT, RIMPAC and COPE. Joint exercises and war games also have been held with Brunei, Indonesia, France and the United States. Besides that, Malaysia, Philippines, Thailand and Vietnam have agreed to host joint security force exercises to secure their maritime borders and tackle issues such as illegal immigration, piracy and smuggling.

Previously, there were fears that extremist militants activities in the Muslim areas of the southern Philippines and southern Thailand could spill over into Malaysia. In response, Malaysia began to strengthen its border security.

== See also ==
- Malaysian Army
- Royal Malaysian Navy
- Royal Malaysian Air Force
- Malaysia Coast Guard
- Royal Malaysia Police
- Royal Johor Military Force
- Joint Forces Command
- Malaysian National Service
