= RMAF Gong Kedak Air Base =

RMAF Gong Kedak TUDM Gong Kedak
- IATA: none; ICAO: WMGK

Summary
- Airport type: Military
- Owner: Royal Malaysian Air Force, Ministry of Defence
- Operator: Royal Malaysian Air Force
- Location: Gong Kedak, Pasir Puteh Kelantan, Malaysia
- Time zone: MST (UTC+08:00)
- Elevation AMSL: 20 ft / 6 m
- Coordinates: 05°47′56″N 102°29′25″E

Map

Runways
Direction	Length		Surface
Direction	m	ft	Surface
08/26	2,012	6,601	Asphalt
- Sources: AIP Malaysia

RMAF Gong Kedak (Malay: TUDM Gong Kedak) (ICAO: WMGK) is an air force base operated by the Royal Malaysian Air Force (Malay: Tentera Udara Diraja Malaysia). It is located in Gong Kedak, Pasir Puteh District, Kelantan, Malaysia.

== History ==
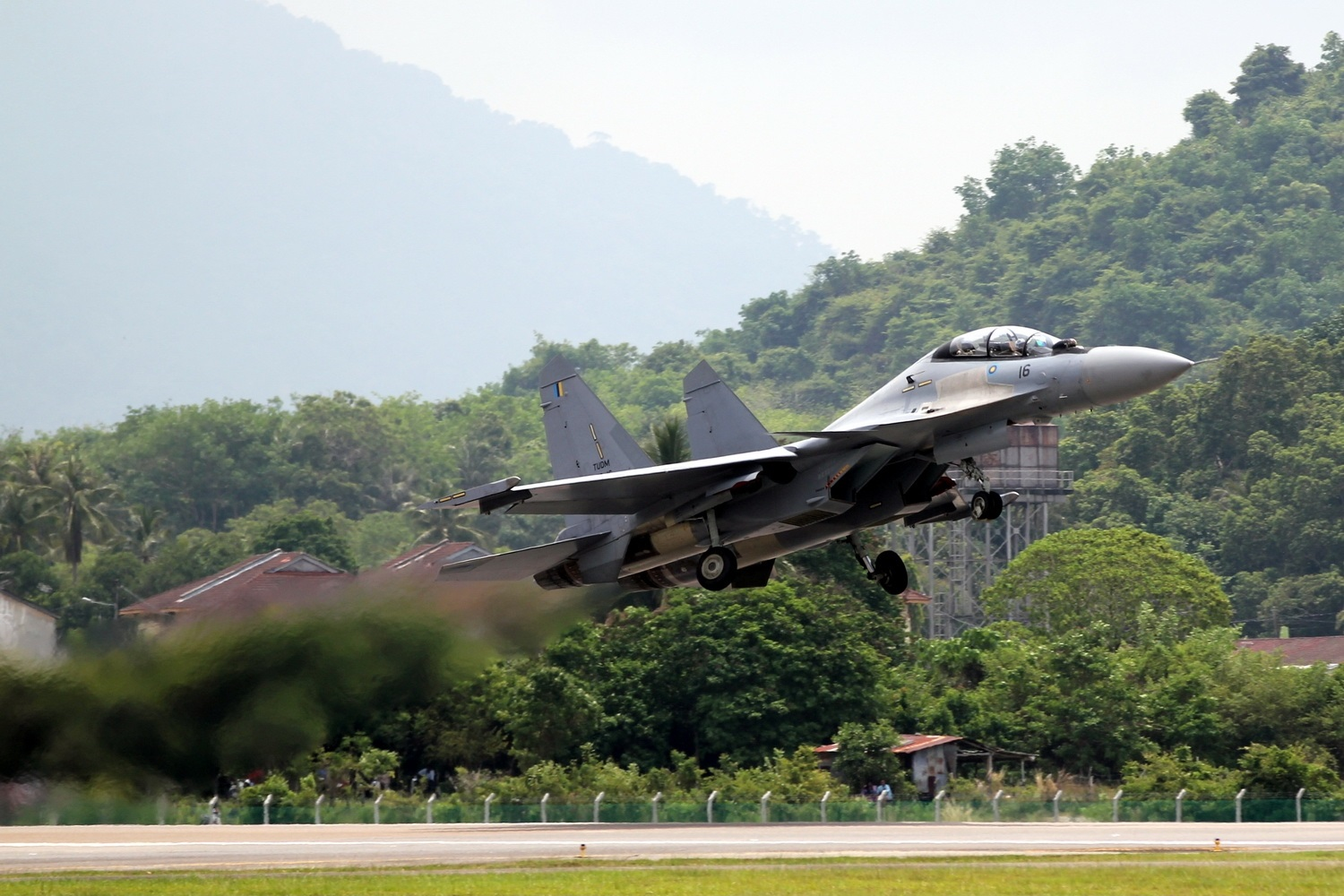
Sukhoi Su-30MKM was based in RMAF Gong Kedak.

The RMAF Gong Kedak existed before World War II where in the early 1960s, this airbase was used by the Royal Air Force for training and then in the 1970s until 1989, the airbase was used by the Malaysian Armed Forces as a training area especially for parachute training. To strengthen national defense, especially the RMAF, the government has decided to develop RMAF Gong Kedak and for this purpose, the government started the land acquisition process for the construction of RMAF Gong Kedak in 1981. Now it is known as "The Home of the Flankers", as the Sukhoi Su-30MKM of 12 Squadron is based there. ATSC Sukhoi Technical Centre also located here to provide maintenance for Sukhoi Su-30MKM.

== Squadrons assigned ==
=== Main squadron ===
Division	Squadrons	Aircraft assigned	Notes
1st Division	No. 12 Squadron	Sukhoi Su-30MKM	

== See also ==
- Royal Malaysian Air Force bases
- List of airports in Malaysia
