= Aerospace Technology Systems Corporation =

Malaysian aerospace company

Aerospace Technology Systems Corporation Sdn Bhd
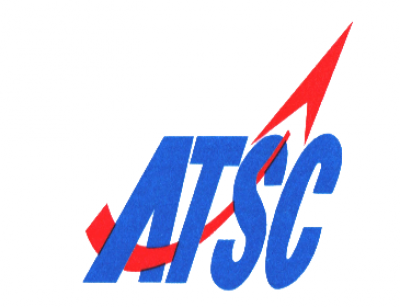
- Type: Private Limited Company
- Industry: Aerospace; Defence
- Founded: 25 June 1994; 32 years ago
- Headquarters: Subang, Selangor, Malaysia
- Website: www.atsc.com.my

The Aerospace Technology Systems Corporation Sdn Bhd (ATSC), is a Malaysian aerospace company that providing aircraft maintenance, repair and overhaul (MRO) service. Its subsidiary of National Aerospace and Defence Industries Sdn Bhd (NADI) and incorporated by Ministry of Finance (MoF).

== History ==
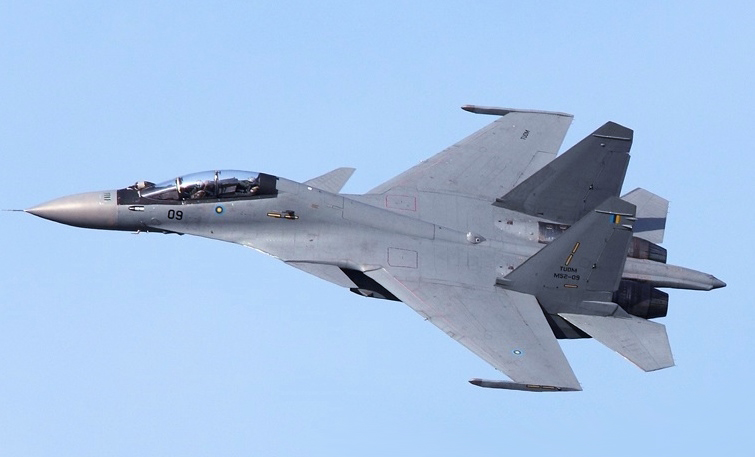
ATSC conducted heavy maintenance for the RMAF's Sukhoi Su-30MKM fleet starting 2017

The company formed in 1994 under the agreement between Malaysian government and Russian State Corporation Rosvoorouzhenie (presently known as Rosoboronexport), and Moscow Aircraft Production Organisation (MAPO) (presently known as PJSC RAC 'MiG').

ATSC's core business is to support Russian made aircraft in Malaysia especially Malaysian Armed Forces such as Mikoyan MiG-29 and Sukhoi Su-30. It aims to be the hub in the region for the Russian made aircraft maintenance, repair and overhaul (MRO) services.

== Divisions ==
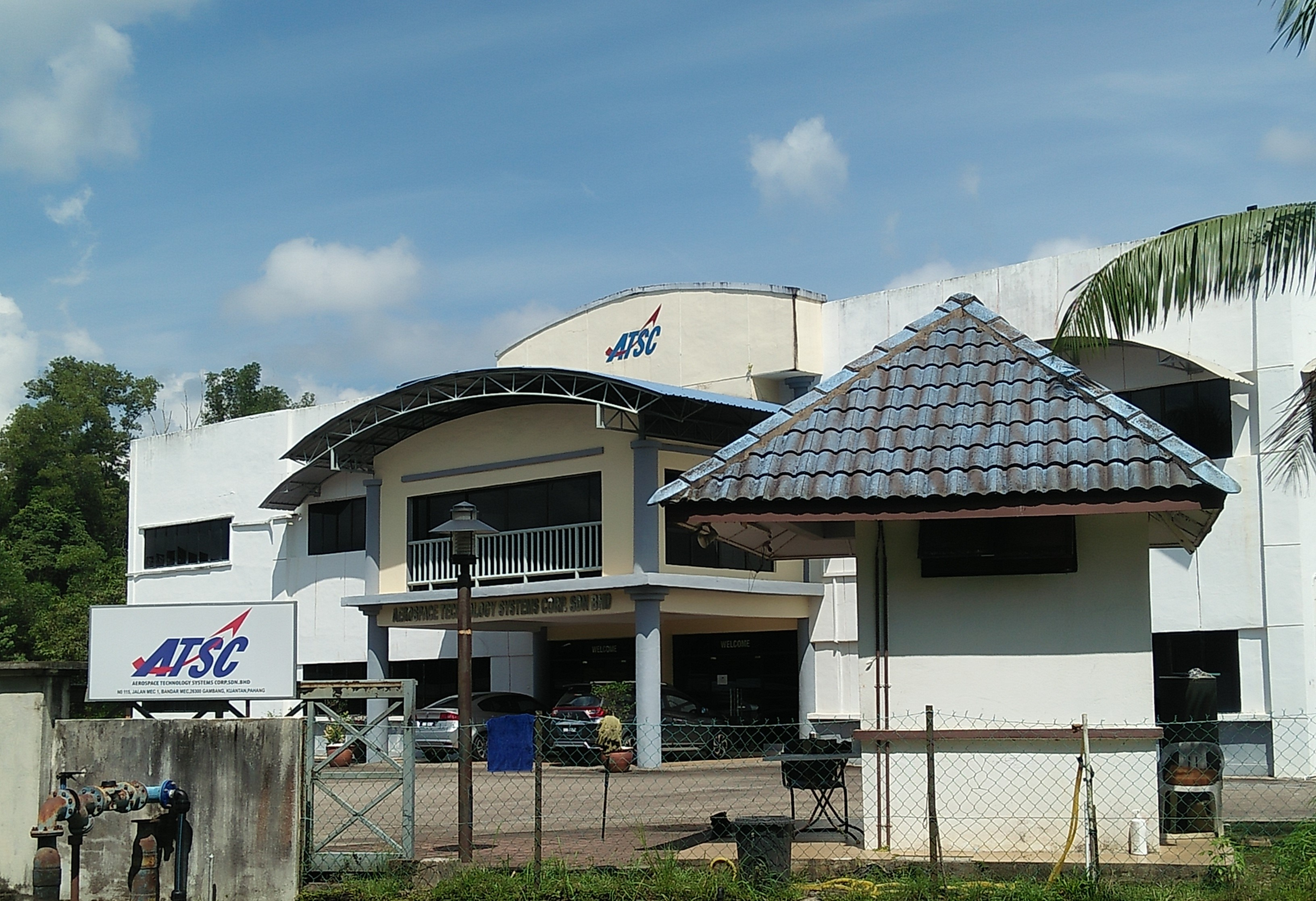
ATSC office

ATSC consists of four divisions which is Sukhoi Technical Centre (STC), MiG Technical Centre (MTC), Logistic Centre (LC) and Engineering Development Centre (EDC).

=== Sukhoi Technical Centre (STC) ===
STC division located at the RMAF Gong Kedak which is the base of Sukhoi Su-30MKM of RMAF. It was formed in 2011 in order to provide heavy MRO for RMAF Sukhoi Su-30 fleet and also to foreign client. STC centre equipped with Component Repair Centre (CRC) that able to carry out repair to Optronic Aiming and Navigation Complex System (OEPrNK), Optical Locater System (OLS), NIIP N011M Radar System, Fly by Wire System (FBW) and also carry out Saturn AL-31 engine module change and repair. STC also provided Service Life Extension Programme (SLEP) and 10 Years Preventive and Restoration Works (PRW) for Sukhoi Su-30. This enable RMAF to MRO their Sukhois fleet in the nation rather send it to the Russia or other country.

=== MiG Technical Centre (MTC) ===
MTC division located at the RMAF Kuantan which is the base of now retired Mikoyan MiG-29 of RMAF. ATSC through its MTC division offered RMAF to upgrade their retired Mikoyan MiG-29 locally in order to keep the fleet in service and as a low cost solution to RMAF. Now, MTC is the headquarters for the entire ATSC operation after the MiG-29 aircraft service was ended by the RMAF in 2015. Over the years, ATSC has developed resources and expertise providing total support for MiG-29N and Su-30MKM aircraft include maintenance, supply and distribution of spares and materials for repair and overhaul, technical services, upgrading and modernization covering engines, airframe and avionics. Its workforce ranging from 70% of RMAF veterans to repurpose their expertise, local graduates and engineers from Moscow Aviation Institute. ATSC engineers and technicians undergo various trainings locally and internationally to ensure precision in performing the maintenance works on the aircraft. ATSC is recognized by Ministry of Defence, Malaysia as Sukhoi Su-30MKM One Stop Centre and one of main pillars for aerospace defence industry under Malaysian Government's Blueprint for sustenance of indigenous capability building.

=== Logistic Centre (LC) ===
Provides support by procurement of Russian made aircraft spare parts, consumables components and parts and POL for both Mikoyan MiG-29 and Sukhoi Su-30 aircraft. The logistics division is also located in Kuantan. The main function of the logistics division is to provide comprehensive support to Su-30MKM aircraft including the supply of spare parts, repair of aircraft avionic and mechanical components as well as providing technical services to the RMAF. The logistics division has a network of vendors who have been audited and appointed from within and outside the country. This appointed vendor has been certified by the Air Assistance Command Headquarters (MPBU) and is listed in ATSC-AVL-001.

=== Engineering Development Centre (EDC) ===
EDC currently located in Gambang serve as the research and development center for ATSC. EDC focuses on repair work without reliance on OEMs as well as equipment development for Su-30MKM aircraft. The development of EDC is in line with the government's aspiration to expand the capabilities of local vendors in the aerospace industry.
