= Multi-role support ship (Malaysia) =

Class of amphibious ship in the Royal Malaysian Navy

Class overview
- Operators: Royal Malaysian Navy (future)
- Preceded by: KD Sri Inderapura
- Planned: 3

General characteristics
- Type: Amphibious transport dock
- Displacement: 10,000-13,000 tons
- Length: 160-170 meters
- Propulsion: Combined diesel and diesel (CODAD)
- Speed: 18 kn (33 km/h; 21 mph)
- Aviation facilities: Enclosed hangar and flight deck for up to 4 medium-sized helicopters

Multi-Role Support Ship (MRSS) is a class of amphibious ship planned for the Royal Malaysian Navy (RMN).

== Development ==
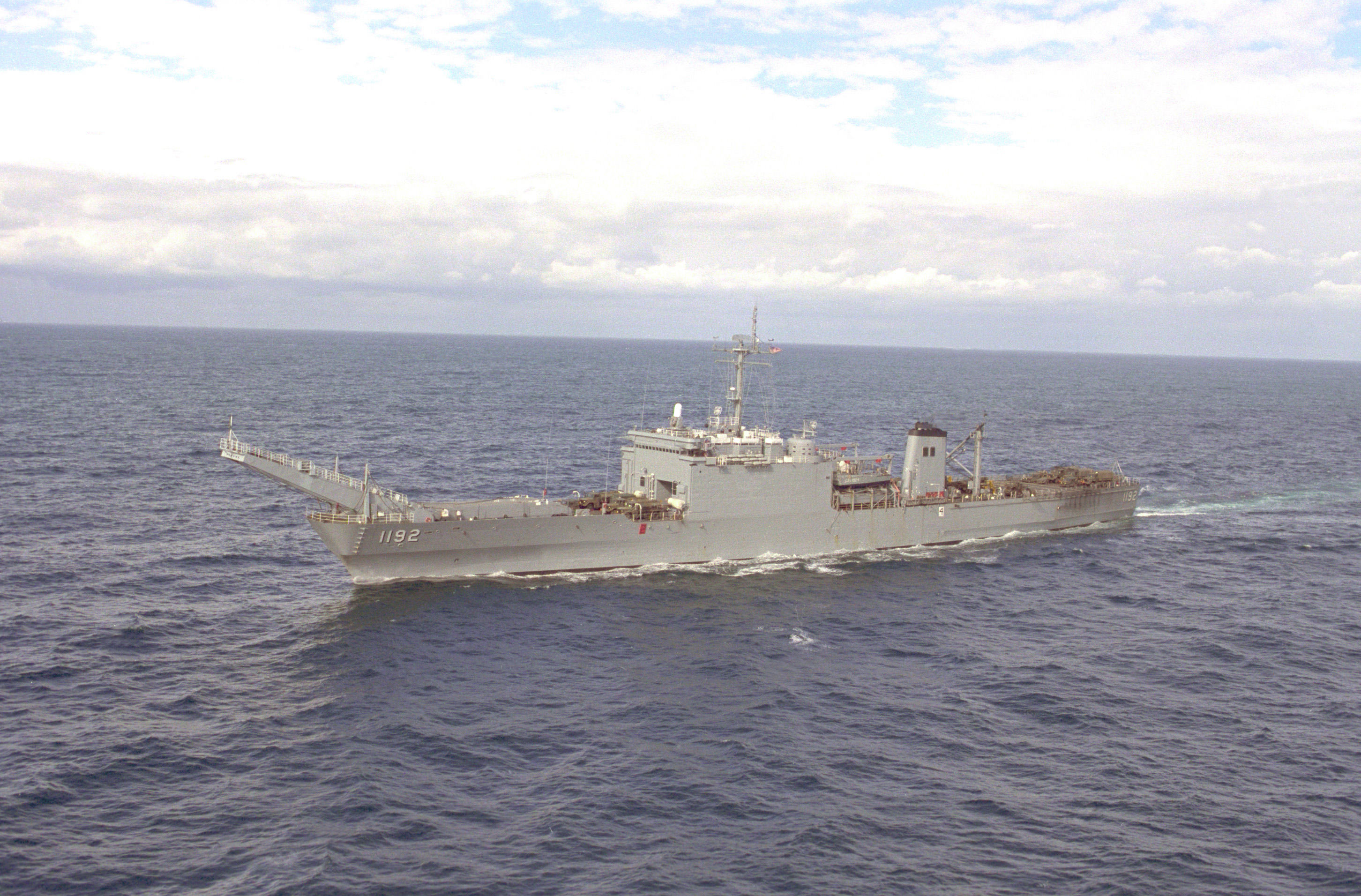
USS Spartanburg County (LST-1192) of the United States Navy before sold to Royal Malaysian Navy as the KD Sri Inderapura (L-1505).

Since the loss of KD Sri Inderapura from a fire in 2009, RMN has had an outstanding need for her replacement. In addition, the lack of the RMN's amphibious assets such as Landing Platform Dock and Landing Ship Tank makes this procurement programme very important to be fulfilled. Due to this matter, RMN has launched their Multi-Role Support Ship (MRSS) programme to procure this type of amphibious ship. This MRSS programme seen in line with RMN's fleet modernisation programme called 15 to 5 where RMN planned to reduce the class of their ship in order to reduce the maintenance cost and easier the logistic support of the fleet. This class of ships includes Scorpène-class submarine, Maharaja Lela-class frigate, Kedah-class offshore patrol vessel, Littoral Mission Ship (Keris-class littoral mission ship and Ada-class corvette) and Multi Role Support Ship (MRSS).

== MRSS contenders ==
=== Mistral 170 LHD ===
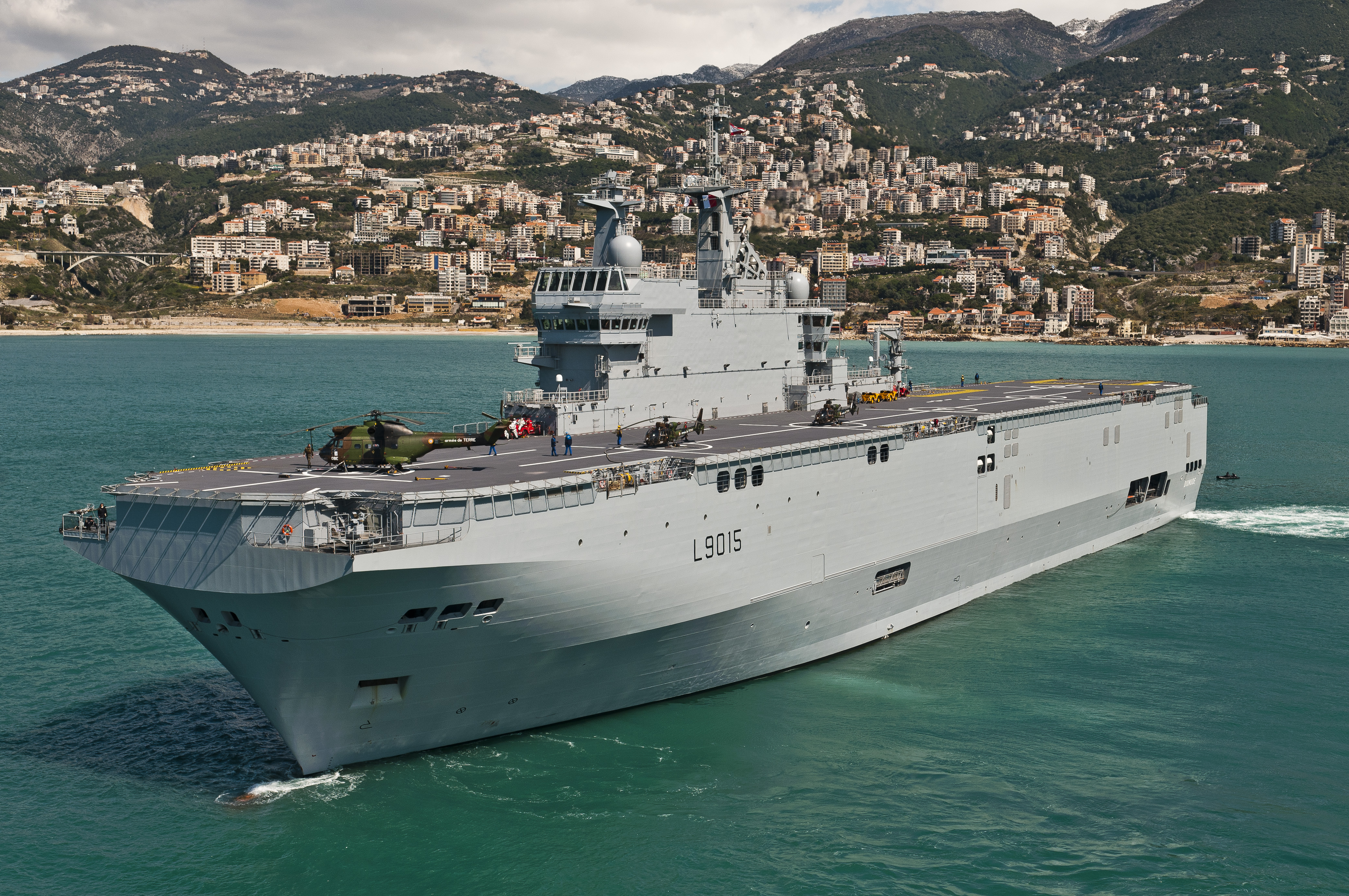
Mistral-class LHD.

Naval Group of France has proposed its downscaled Mistral Landing Helicopter Dock called Mistral 170. This ship has 170 meters in length and 14,000 tons displacement. It will have full length flight deck with five helicopter landing spots. The propulsion system will be two azimuth pods and bow thruster where it can bring the ship to reach 15 knots.

=== Type 075 LHD ===
China through China State Shipbuilding Corporation offered their downsized Type 075 Landing Helicopter Dock. This proposal and design of ship first unveiled in Defence Services Asia (DSA) in 2018.

=== Type 071 amphibious transport dock ===
China also has offered a modified Type 071 to Malaysia. This proposal design of this ship was unveiled in LIMA 2019.

=== Damen Enforcer 10000 LPD ===
Damen of Netherland has positions their Enforcer 10000 Landing Platform Dock for MRSS programme. Damen proposed ship has 160 meters in length and 11,000 tons displacement. This ship able to carried up to four helicopter where two can be parked at outside landing spot and another two can be stored in hangar. Powered by two 8,000 kW engines bring the ship to cruise at maximum speed of 18 knots.

=== TAIS LPD ===
TAIS from Turkey has unveiled their plan to propose MRSS programme at LIMA 2019. The proposed ship already adopts modern and stealth design with the three landing spots for medium-sized helicopter and capability to stored another two in hangar. Powered by two propulsion systems it will allow the ship to reach maximum speed at 18 knots.

=== Makassar LPD ===
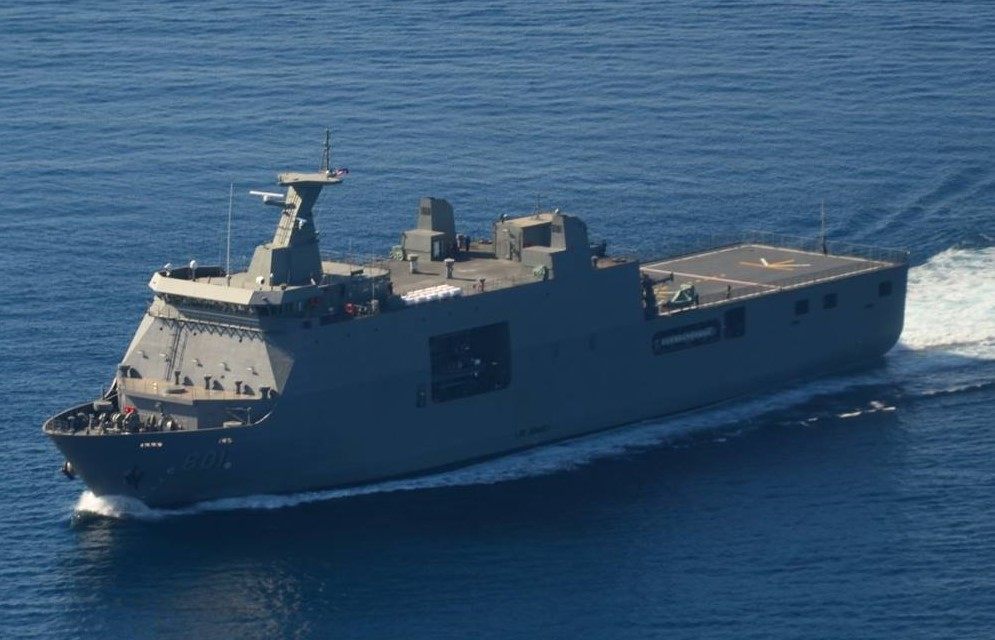
Makassar-class LPD.

PT PAL Indonesia has offered their Makassar Landing Platform Dock to RMN. Makassar-class that offered will be bigger than ships that owned by Indonesian Navy and Philippine Navy. PT PAL also ready to offered Transfer of Technology (ToT) to local company Boustead Heavy Industries (BHIC) if this ship selected by RMN.

=== Mitsui MRSS ===
At MAST Asia 2019, shipbuilder Mitsui Engineering & Shipbuilding (Mitsui E&S) of Japan unveiled its MRSS design. Mitsui's MRSS design has a transportation capacity of 500 troops, 16 main battle tanks, 6 armored vehicles, 1 ambulance vehicle. The helicopter hangar has room for two medium helicopters plus several UAVs. The well deck can accommodate two landing craft (LCM type). Mitsui's MRSS can launch and recover two medium size helicopters simultaneously, EC725 type of the RMAF. The vessel has a length of 160 meters and a breadth of 24 meters for a displacement of 13,000 tons. The crew complement is 150 people.

=== HDL 13000 MRSS ===
HDL 13000, unveiled by South Korean shipbuilder Hyundai Heavy Industries (HHI) at DSA 2022, is a multi-role support ship which has 160 meters of length overall, 25 meters of beam, and a displacement of 13,000 tons. It can carry more than 16 Main Battle Tanks and 6 Multirole Armored Vehicles. The aft portion of the vehicle deck also serves as a well deck. A sideport ramp and a stern gate provide access to the vehicle deck, and the ship has sufficient ballast tank capacity to sink/trim the vessel to flood the well deck to accommodate landing craft that can be used to transfer personnel, vehicles, and/or cargo to and from the shore.

=== Improved San Giorgio ===
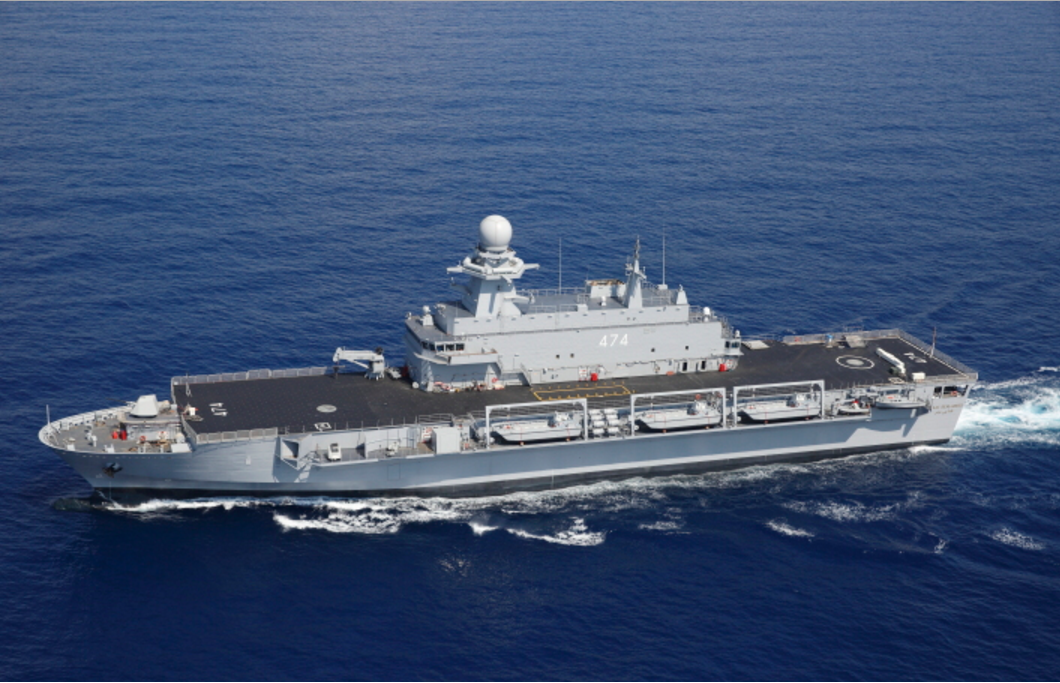
Enlarged and improved version of the San Giorgio class, Kalaat Béni Abbès.

In July 2025, in conjunction of Prime Minister Anwar visits in Italy, Italian firm, Fincantieri officially offered improved San Giorgio for the MRSS requirement.

=== STM MRSS ===
In LIMA 2025, Turkey company, STM unveiled its Multi Role Support Ship specifically tailored for the requirement of Malaysia MRSS program.

== See also ==
- Royal Malaysian Navy
- Equipment of the Royal Malaysian Navy
