= USS Spartanburg County =

Newport-class tank landing ship

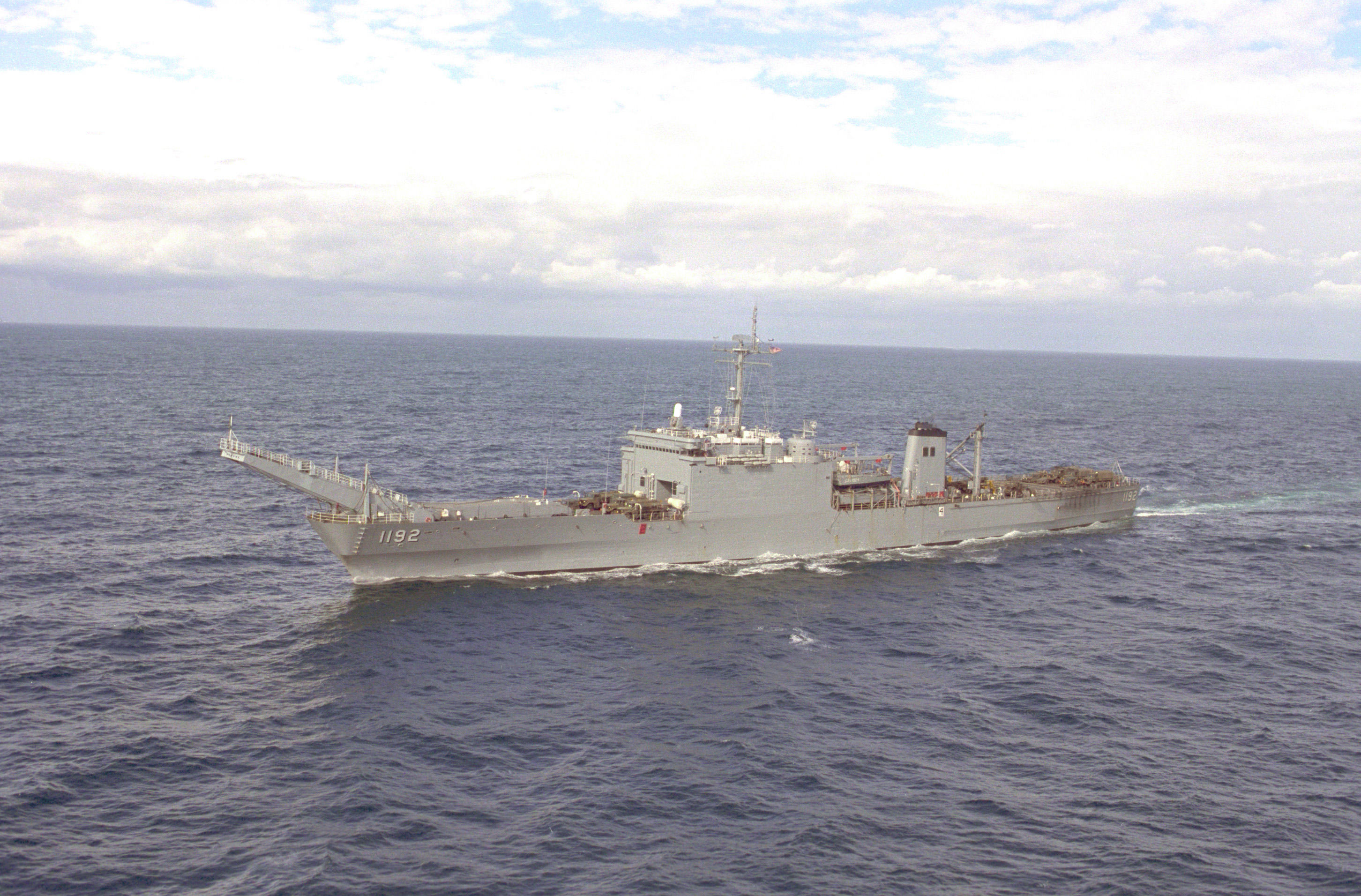
- USS Spartanburg County (LST-1192)

History

United States
- Name: Spartanburg Country
- Namesake: Spartanburg County, South Carolina
- Ordered: 15 July 1966
- Builder: National Steel and Shipbuilding Company, San Diego, California
- Laid down: 7 February 1970
- Launched: 7 November 1970
- Commissioned: 1 September 1971
- Decommissioned: 16 December 1994
- Stricken: 16 December 1994
- Identification: Hull number: LST-1192
- Fate: Sold to Malaysia, 16 December 1994

Malaysia
- Name: KD Sri Inderapura
- Acquired: 16 December 1994
- Decommissioned: 21 January 2010
- Identification: L 1505
- Fate: Destroyed by fire while in harbor on 8 October 2009
- Badge

General characteristics as built
- Class & type: Newport-class tank landing ship
- Displacement: 4,793 long tons (4,870 t) light; 8,342 long tons (8,476 t) full load
- Length: 522 ft 4 in (159.2 m) oa; 562 ft (171.3 m) over derrick arms
- Beam: 69 ft 6 in (21.2 m)
- Draft: 17 ft 6 in (5.3 m) max
- Propulsion: 2 shafts; 6 Alco diesel engines (3 per shaft); 16,500 shp (12,300 kW); Bow thruster
- Speed: 22 knots (41 km/h; 25 mph) max
- Range: 2,500 nmi (4,600 km; 2,900 mi) at 14 knots (26 km/h; 16 mph)
- Troops: 431 max
- Complement: 213
- Sensors & processing systems: 2 × Mk 63 GCFS; SPS-10 radar
- Armament: 2 × twin 3"/50 caliber guns
- Aviation facilities: Helicopter deck

USS Spartanburg County (LST-1192) was the fourteenth of twenty Newport-class tank landing ships of the United States Navy (USN) which replaced the traditional bow door-design tank landing ships (LSTs). Named after a county in South Carolina, the ship was constructed by National Steel and Shipbuilding Company of San Diego, California. The LST was launched in 1970 and was commissioned in 1971. Assigned to the United States Atlantic Fleet, Spartanburg County deployed regularly to the Caribbean and Mediterranean Seas. In 1983 and 1985, the vessel was present in Lebanese waters. In 1990, the LST was deployed to the Persian Gulf in the Gulf War, returning to the United States in 1991. Spartanburg County was decommissioned and struck from the Naval Vessel Register in 1994.

Transferred to the Royal Malaysian Navy and commissioned as KD Sri Inderapura in 1995, the LST was deployed off the coast of Somalia in anti-piracy operations in 2008. The ship suffered two major fires, the first in 2002 after which Sri Inderapura was repaired and returned to service. The second took place in 2009 after which the vessel sank, while berthed at the Lumut naval base. The commanding officer of the vessel had his service terminated two days after he was court marshalled on January 25, 2010 for the loss of the vessel. The ship was raised and decommissioned on 21 January 2010.

== Design and description ==
Spartanburg County was a Newport-class tank landing ship which were designed to meet the goal put forward by the United States amphibious forces to have a tank landing ship (LST) capable of over 20 knots (37 km/h; 23 mph). However, the traditional bow door form for LSTs would not be capable. Therefore, the designers of the Newport class came up with a design of a traditional ship hull with a 112-foot (34 m) aluminum ramp slung over the bow supported by two derrick arms. The 34-long-ton (35 t) ramp was capable of sustaining loads up to 75 long tons (76 t). This made the Newport class the first to depart from the standard LST design that had been developed in early World War II.

The LST had a displacement of 4,793 long tons (4,870 t) when light and 8,342 long tons (8,476 t) at full load. Spartanburg County was 522 feet 4 inches (159.2 m) long overall and 562 ft (171.3 m) over the derrick arms which protruded past the bow. The vessel had a beam of 69 ft 6 in (21.2 m), a draft forward of 11 ft 5 in (3.5 m) and 17 ft 5 in (5.3 m) at the stern at full load.

Spartanburg County was fitted with six Alco 16-645-ES diesel engines turning two shafts, three to each shaft. The system was rated at 16,500 brake horsepower (12,300 kW) and gave the ship a maximum speed of 22 knots (41 km/h; 25 mph) for short periods and could only sustain 20 knots (37 km/h; 23 mph) for an extended length of time. The LST carried 1,750 long tons (1,780 t) of diesel fuel for a range of 2,500 nautical miles (4,600 km; 2,900 mi) at the cruising speed of 14 knots (26 km/h; 16 mph). The ship was also equipped with a bow thruster to allow for better maneuvering near causeways and to hold position while offshore during the unloading of amphibious vehicles.

The Newport class were larger and faster than previous LSTs and were able to transport tanks, heavy vehicles and engineer groups and supplies that were too large for helicopters or smaller landing craft to carry. The LSTs have a ramp forward of the superstructure that connects the lower tank deck with the main deck and a passage large enough to allow access to the parking area amidships. The vessels are also equipped with a stern gate to allow the unloading of amphibious vehicles directly into the water or to unload onto a utility landing craft (LCU) or pier. At either end of the tank deck there is a 30 ft (9.1 m) turntable that permits vehicles to turn around without having to reverse. The Newport class has the capacity for 500 long tons (510 t) of vehicles, 19,000 ft^{2} (1,800 m^{2}) of cargo area and could carry up to 431 troops. The vessels also have davits for four vehicle and personnel landing craft (LCVPs) and could carry four pontoon causeway sections along the sides of the hull.

Spartanburg County was initially armed with four Mark 33 3-inch (76 mm)/50 caliber guns in two twin turrets. The vessel was equipped with two Mk 63 gun control fire systems (GCFS) for the 3-inch guns, but these were removed in 1977–1978. The ship also had SPS-10 surface search radar. Atop the stern gate, the vessels mounted a helicopter deck. They had a maximum complement of 213 including 11 officers.

== Construction and career ==
=== US service ===
The LST was ordered as the fifth hull of the third group of the Newport class in Fiscal Year 1967 and a contract was awarded on 15 July 1966. The ship was laid down on 7 February 1970 at San Diego, California by the National Steel and Shipbuilding Company. Named after a county in South Carolina, Spartanburg County was launched on 7 November 1970, sponsored by the wife of Neville Holcombe. The LST was commissioned into the United States Navy on 1 September 1971 and assigned to the Amphibious Force, Atlantic Fleet.

Spartanburg County transited the Panama Canal and arrived at the LST's new home port, Little Creek, Virginia. From there the tank landing ship alternated routine operations along the east coast of the United States and in the Caribbean Sea with deployments to the Mediterranean Sea. Spartanburg County maintained this pattern into 1980. In 1983, while in port at Beirut, Lebanon, crew from Spartanburg County aided in extinguishing a fire aboard the Lebanese freighter Aziz. In June 1985, Spartanburg County was among the ships deployed off the Lebanese coast in response to the terrorist hijacking of TWA Flight 847 and the dispersal of some hostages around Beirut.

During the Gulf War, Spartanburg County was part of Amphibious Group 2 (PhibGru2). Tasked with transporting part of the 4th Marine Expeditionary Brigade (4th MEB) via the Mediterranean to the Persian Gulf, the group was divided up into transit groups, with Spartanburg County joining Transit Group 1. (Note: Transit Group 1 was composed of USS Gunston Hall, USS Shreveport, USS Trenton, USS Portland and Spartanburg County.) Along with elements of the 4th MEB, the LST transported the aviation command and control equipment of Marine Air Control Group 28, Det 1. Transit Group 1 departed Morehead City, North Carolina on 17 August 1990 and united with the other transit groups off Masirah Island on 16 September. Transit Group 1 rejoined PhibGru2. PhibGru2 was split back into respective transit groups on 24 March 1991 and Transit Group 1 returned to Camp Lejeune, North Carolina on 17 April after a ceasefire had been declared on 1 April. Spartanburg County was decommissioned and struck from the Naval Vessel Register on 16 December 1994.

=== Malaysian service ===
Spartanburg County was acquired by Malaysia in a cash sale as part of the Security Assistance Program on 16 December 1994. The ship was commissioned into the Royal Malaysian Navy as KD Sri Inderapura. The vessel was refit between 1995 and 1998 at Johore. On 15 December 2002, the ship was damaged by fire. Sri Inderapura was subsequently rebuilt and returned to service which included deployments to Somalian waters in September 2008 as part of international anti-piracy efforts. On 8 October 2009, while berthed at the Lumut Naval Base, Sri Inderapura caught fire and sank. The vessel was later raised. Sri Inderapura was decommissioned by the Royal Malaysian Navy on 21 January 2010.
