= Gading Marine =

Malaysian maritime company

Gading Marine Industry
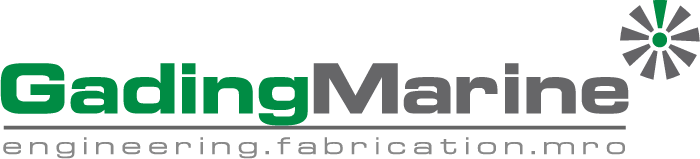
- Company type: Private Limited Company
- Industry: Shipbuilding; Defence
- Headquarters: Selangor, Malaysia
- Parent: Gading Group

Gading Marine Industry also known as Gading Marine is a Malaysian private company engaged in maritime industry including shipbuilding, marine engineering, system integration, ship fabricator, ship maintenance and repair services. Gading Marine operates under its parent company Gading Group and its headquarters located in Selangor. The company also owned a shipyard in other location in the country.

== History ==
Gading Marine works closely with local universities such as University of Kuala Lumpur in the development and construction of the boats for use in Malaysia as well as training related university students in the field of marine.

In 2019, Gading Marine has delivered two fast interceptor craft FAC PC 31 to the Royal Malaysia Police. In 2020, Gading Marine wins a tender to supply six fast interceptor craft G2000 FIC 18m MK I to the Royal Malaysian Navy. In 2022, Royal Malaysian Navy ordered 13 new batch of G2000 FIC 18m MK II fast interceptor craft to supplement the six delivered earlier.

== Capabilities ==
Gading Marine specializes in the field of shipbuilding as a builder of fast interceptor and assault craft. It is fully fabricated and assembled locally at a local shipyard in Lumut, Perak. Gading Marine has built and supplied local law enforcement agencies such as marine police and naval force.

== Products ==
Product Model	Class	Key Specifications	Max Speed	Primary Role / Operator
G3000 FIC	35m Class	34.8m Length, 7.0m Beam, 3x MTU 16V2000 Engines	40 knots	Long-range maritime security and coastal defense.
G2000 FIC MKII	18m Class	18m Length, 2x MAN V12 1650hp, Hamilton HTX42 Waterjets	52 knots	Rapid response and interception; used by the Royal Malaysian Navy.
G2000 FIC MKI	18m Class	18m Length, 2x MAN 1550hp, Hamilton HM461 Waterjets	52 knots	Coastal security; the predecessor to the MKII variant.
G2000 FAC	18m Class	17.6m Length, 2x MAN V8 1200hp, Hamilton HJ403 Waterjets	45 knots	Coastal patrol and surveillance; used by the Royal Malaysia Police.
G500 FAC	10m Class	10.7m Length, 3x 325hp Outboard Motors, Composite Hull	60 knots	Tactical operations in shallow/coastal waters.
Fire & Rescue Boat	13m Class	13.6m Length, 3x 300hp Outboard Motors, 700 m³/hr Fire Pump	40 knots	Maritime firefighting and SAR; used by Bomba Malaysia.
RHFB	9m Class	9m Length, 2x 250hp Yamaha Outboards, Aluminium Hull	46 knots	Rigid Hull Fender Boat for clandestine missions and boarding.
FCB 41m	41m Class	41m Length, 3x Yanmar Engines, Hamilton HM571 Waterjets	30 knots	Fast Crew Boat for offshore transport and light cargo.
PTV 57m	57m Class	57.6m Length, 4x MAN 12V175D Engines, Hamilton HT810 Waterjets	25+ knots	Multi-purpose Police Transport Vessel for logistics and troop movement.
