= Aircraft Inspection, Repair & Overhaul Depot =

Malaysian aerospace company

Aircraft Inspection, Repair & Overhaul Depot Sdn Bhd
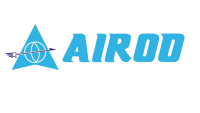
- Type: Private Limited Company
- Industry: Aerospace; Defence
- Founded: 1975; 51 years ago
- Headquarters: Selangor, Malaysia
- Website: www.airod.com.my

Aircraft Inspection, Repair & Overhaul Depot Sdn Bhd or AIROD is a Malaysian aerospace company engaged in providing aircraft maintenance, repair and overhaul (MRO) services. The name AIROD is an acronym that stands for Aircraft Inspection, Repair & Overhaul Depot.

== History ==
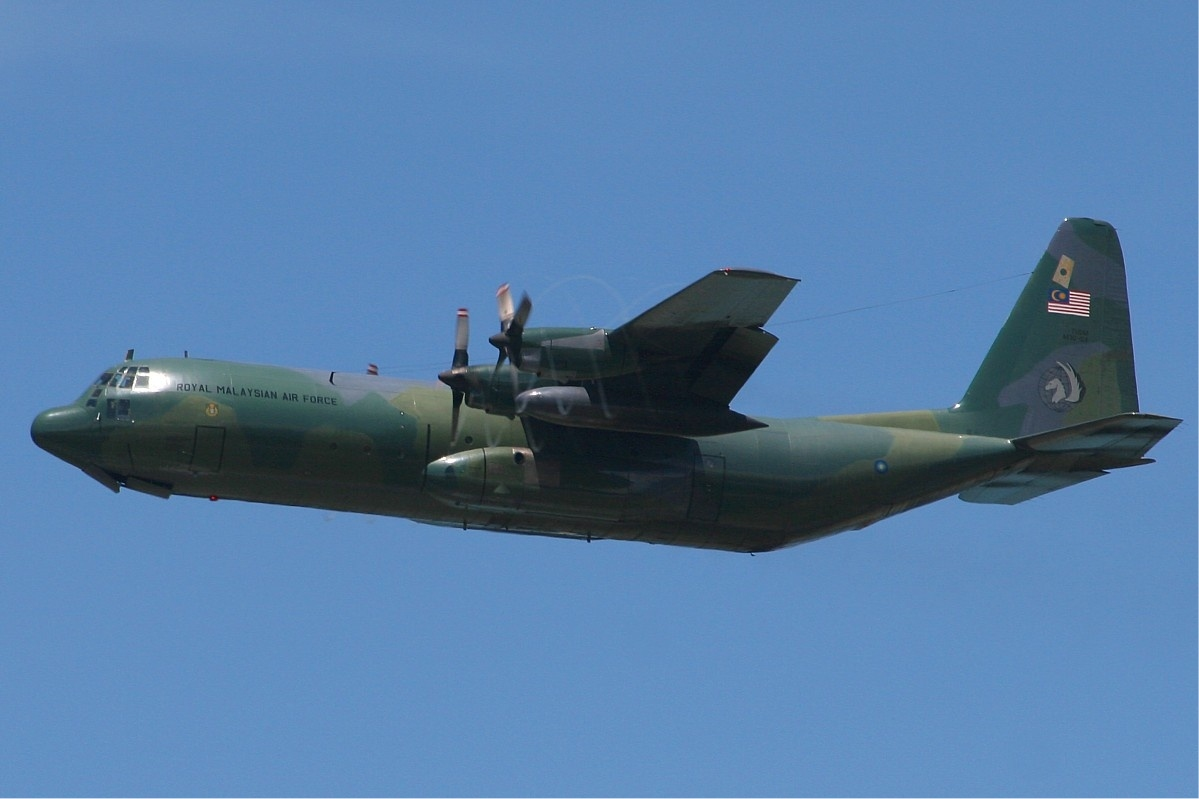
Lockheed C-130 Hercules is one of the aircraft type service by AIROD

It was established in 1975 as the only in-country facility to support the Royal Malaysian Air Force (RMAF) aircraft. In 1985, AIROD was privatised as a joint-venture company between Malaysia's National Aerospace & Defence Industries Bhd (NADI) and Lockheed Aircraft Systems International (LASI) of the US.

Today, AIROD is a fully Malaysian-owned company under the NADI group of companies and is a leading MRO facility providing services to regional and global customers in the Southeast Asian region.

AIROD's multimillion-dollar MRO facility is located at the Sultan Abdul Aziz Shah (SAAS) Airport Complex at Subang, northwest of Kuala Lumpur, Malaysia's capital city, where it occupies a 77.4-acre (313,000 m^{2}) site on the northeastern side of the runway. The facility includes both narrow- and wide-body aircraft hangars, a paint and strip hangar, support shops, and engine test cells. In January 2005, a partnership agreement was established between AIROD Malaysia and AAR Corporation to establish a regional MRO centre for landing gears in Subang.

== Facilities and capabilities ==
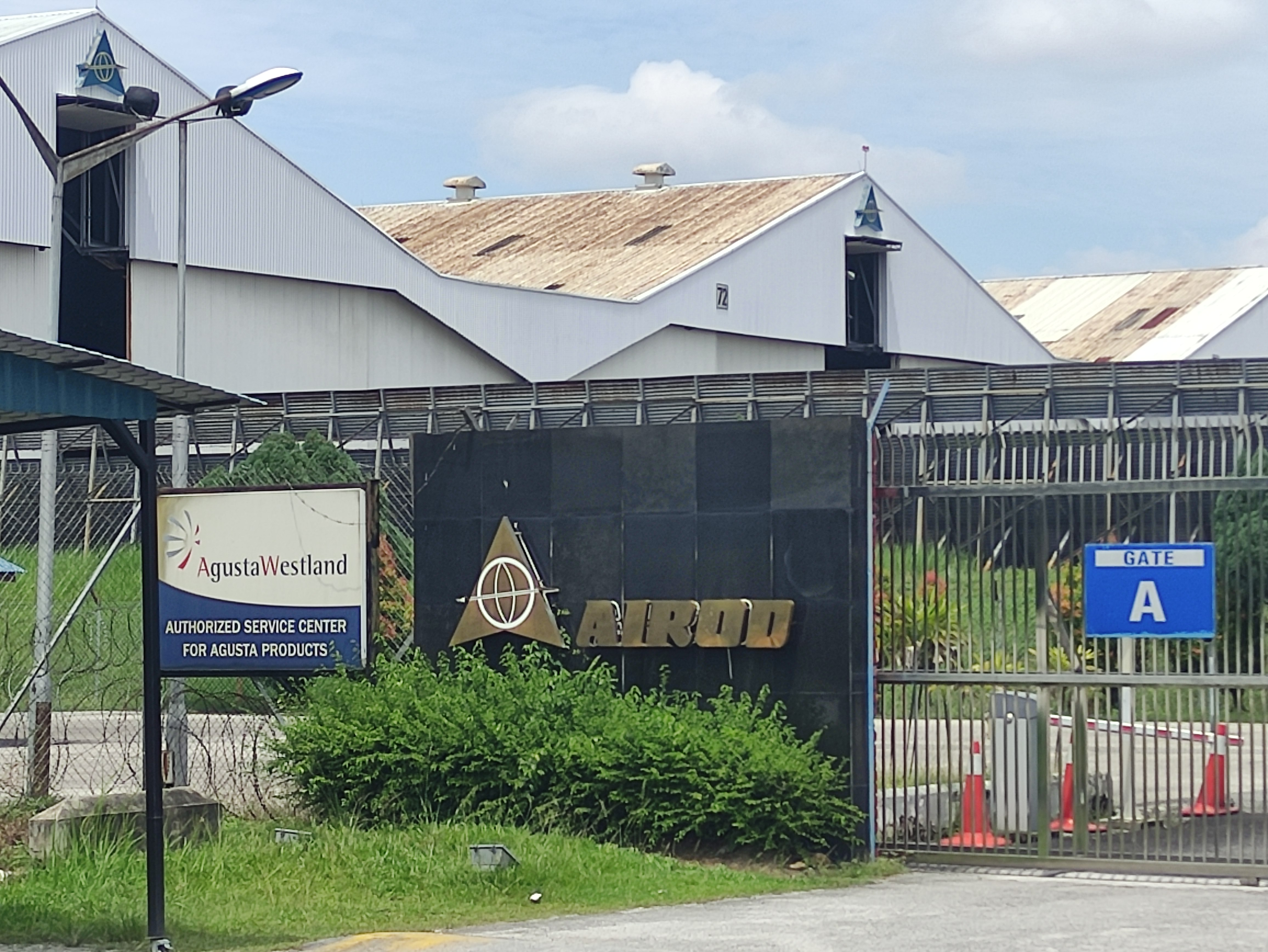
AIROD facilities entrance (Gate A)

=== Aircraft MRO, modification and upgrades ===
- C-130 fuselage stretch
- C-130 tanker conversion
- Mi-171 airborne fire fighting system
- Scheduled maintenance
- Avionics modernization / upgrade
- Service life extension
- Rewiring
- NVIS modification
- System integration
- Structural modification
- Ageing aircraft program
- Interior refurbishment & conversion
- Corrosion control / repair
- Crash damage repair

=== Engine maintenance repair and overhaul ===
- Rolls-Royce T56/501
- General Electric CT58/T58
- Pratt & Whitney PT6

=== Aero & avionics components maintenance, repair & overhaul ===
Mechanical components

- Propellers
- Wheels, tires & brakes
- Gear boxes
- Rotor heads
- Landing gears
- Hydraulic servos & actuators
- Drive shafts
- Fuel control units
- Rotor balancing
- Fuel / oil pumps
- Fuel governors
- Fuel nozzles
- Fuel flow dividers

Avionics components

- Flight instruments
- Electrical components
- Communications & navigation equipment
- Wire harness fabrication
- Electronics & precision measurement
- PME calibration
- Aircraft batteries’ servicing

== Aircraft ==
=== Fixed wing ===
- Boeing 727-200 / 737-200 / 737-900 (BBJ)
- Bombardier Regionel Jet / Global Express
- Dassault Falcon F900
- Lockheed Martin C-130 / L-100 / KC-130-J
- CN-235
- Fokker F-28
- Pilatus PC-7
- Pilatus PC-7 Mk II
- Beechcraft King Air B200T
- Northrop F-5
- BAE Hawk 108 / 208
- Alenia Aermacchi MB339AM/CM

=== Rotary wing ===
- Sikorsky S61A / S70A
- Agusta Westland Super Lynx Mk300
- Agusta A109 LOH / LUH
- Agusta Westland A109P/E
- Agusta Westland AW139
- Mil Mi-17 / 171
- Aerospatiale Alouette IIIB

== Customer ==
=== Military ===
- Bangladesh Air Force (BAF)
- Botswana Defense Forces (BDF)
- Ecuador Air Force (FAE)
- Indonesian Air Force (TNI-AU)
- Kuwait Air Force (KAF)
- Libyan Air Force (LAF)
- Malaysian Army Aviation (MAA)
- Pakistan Air Force (PAF)
- Philippine Air Force (PAF)
- Royal Malaysian Air Force (RMAF)
- Royal Malaysian Navy (RMN)
- Royal Malaysian Police Air Unit (RMPAU)
- Royal Thai Air Force (RTAF)
- Sri Lanka Air Force (SLAF)
- United States Air Force (USAF)
- United States Marine Corps (USMC)
- Yemen Air Force (YAF)

=== Non-military ===
- Air Niugini, Papua New Guinea
- DERCO Aerospace Inc., USA
- Department of Civil Aviation, Malaysia
- Fire & Rescue Department (Bomba), Malaysia
- SAFAIR, South Africa
- Transafrik International, Uganda
- Weststar Aviation, Malaysia
- Aventura Aviation
- Gading Sari
- Mafira Air
- Neptune Air
- Pacific Air
- Pegasus Air
- Repex
- Royal Air Cambodge
- Sempati Air
- Transmile Air
