= Labuan Shipyard and Engineering =

Malaysian shipbuilding company

Labuan Shipyard & Engineering Sdn Bhd (LSE)
- Company type: Private Limited Company
- Industry: Shipbuilding; Prefabrication; Oil and gas Defence
- Founded: 1972
- Headquarters: Labuan, Malaysia
- Key people: YBhg Dato’ Azian Osman (Chairman)
- Products: Ships; Power barges Oil and gas
- Revenue: Non-disclosed
- Website: https://labuanshipyard.com

Labuan Shipyard and Engineering (LSE) is a Malaysian shipbuilding company based in the East Malaysian island of Federal Territory of Labuan, Malaysia. It is the biggest shipyard in Borneo.

== History ==
LSE was formed in 1972 and its main operations centre located on a 60-acre fabrication yard in Labuan, Malaysia. LSE is wholly owned by Radimax Group Sdn. Bhd. The company main business includes both the shipbuilding and ship repair and oil and gas industry.

LSE provided maintenance and servicing for private and government vessels including Royal Malaysian Navy and Malaysia Coast Guard. In 2024, LSE was awarded a contract to supply two motherships for Royal Malaysia Police.

== Facilities and capabilities ==
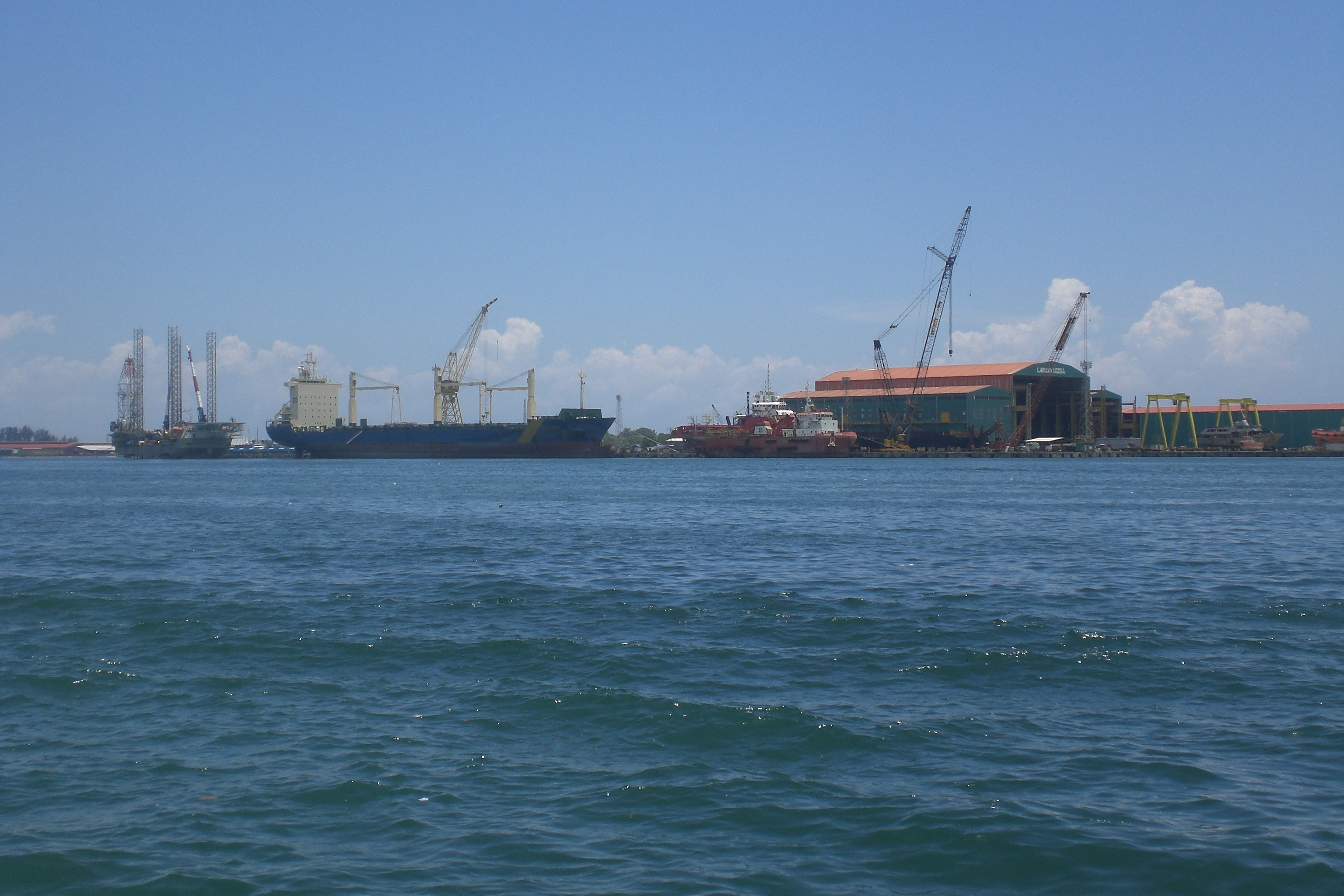
Labuan Shipyard and Engineering facilities from far

=== Facilities ===
Located on 60-acre yard in strategic locations in Asia Pacific region, LSE owned a natural deep-water access and shelter from monsoons. LSE assets also includes:

- 16,000-deadweight tonne ship handling
- 24,000-tonne fabrication output per year
- 200-tonne tested bollard pull testing facility
- 7,000-tonne shiplift system
- 12,000 and 3,000-tonne capacity of loadout skidway and quay.

=== Capabilities ===
LSE main business is the shipbuilding and ship repair. This includes both for commercial and naval vessels.

Other than shipbuilding and ship repair, LSE also owned an expertise in offshore and onshore facilities fabrication and maintenance and also civil engineering.
