= Sukhoi Su-30MKM =

Malaysian variant of Indo-Russian Sukhoi Su-30MKI fighter aircraft

Su-30MKM
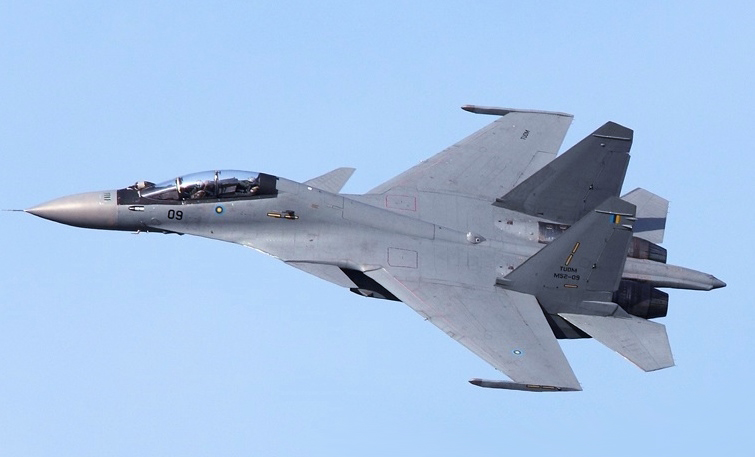
- A Royal Malaysian Air Force Su-30MKM

General information
- Type: Air superiority fighter, Multirole fighter
- National origin: Russia
- Designer: Sukhoi
- Built by: Irkut Corporation
- Status: In service
- Primary user: Royal Malaysian Air Force
- Number built: 18

History
- Introduction date: 2007
- First flight: August 2003; 23 years ago
- Developed from: Sukhoi Su-30; Sukhoi Su-30MKI

The Sukhoi Su-30MKM (NATO reporting name: Flanker-H) is a twin-engine supermaneuverable fighter of the Royal Malaysian Air Force (RMAF). It is a variant of the Su-30 series fighters, with many significant improvements over the original Su-30MK export version. The Su-30MKM was developed by the Sukhoi Design Bureau and is based on the Su-30MKI of the Indian Air Force. Both aircraft have common airframe, thrust vectoring engines and a digital fly-by-wire system, however the MKM version differs from the MKI mainly in the composition of the onboard avionics. It can carry up to 8,000 kg (17,637 lb) payload over a 1,296 km (805 mi; 700 nmi) un-refueled combat radius.

In 2003, the Su-30MKM was selected by the Royal Malaysian Air Force. In August 2003, during the course of President Vladimir Putin's official visit to Malaysia, the contract for the Su-30MKM aircraft was signed. Except for Russian MiG-29N, the RMAF has previously operated aircraft of Western origin.

== Development ==
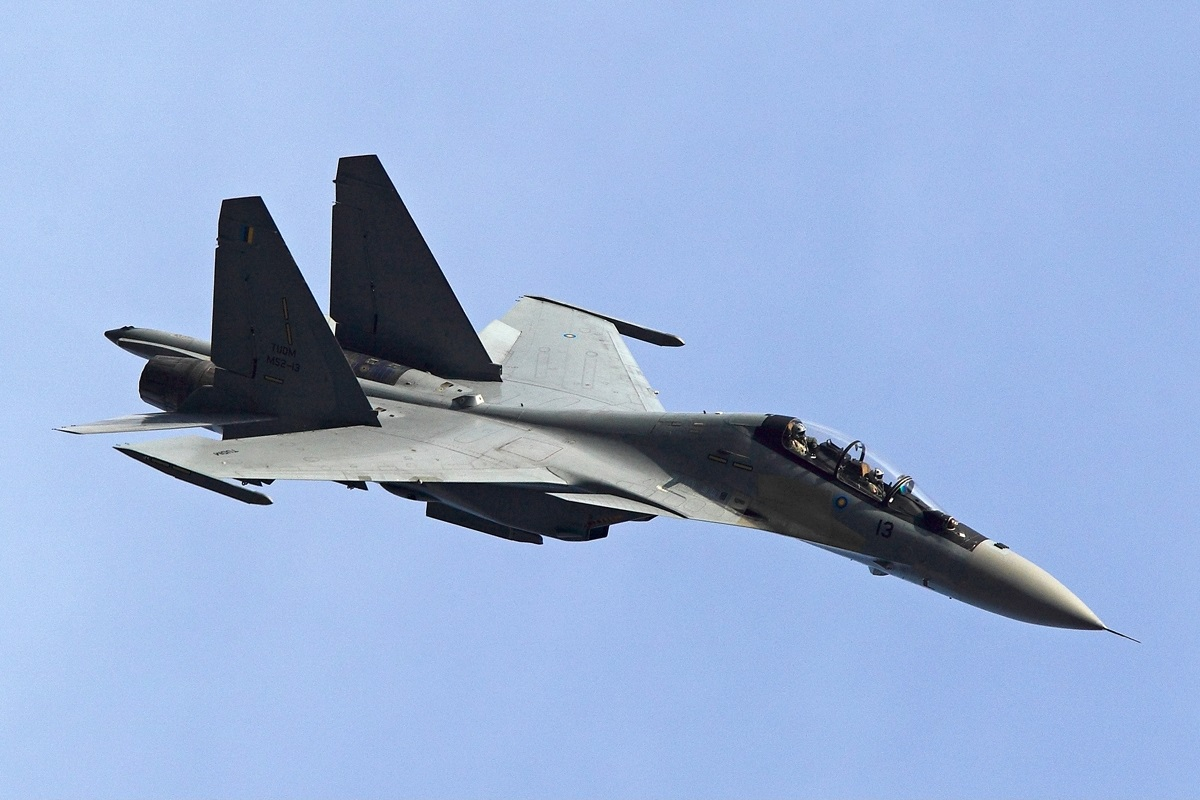
Su-30MKM flying at LIMA

In August 2003, Malaysia signed a US$900 million contract with Irkut Corporation for 18 Sukhoi Su-30MKMs. Malaysia operates eight legacy F/A-18D Hornet, F-5E Tiger II and A-4PTM Skyhawk and was offered Boeing's F/A-18E/F Super Hornet, but the Royal Malaysian Air Force chose the Su-30MKM instead. The Su-30MKM is an advanced variant, with considerable performance related improvements over its Su-30MK/MKK counterparts. Irkut Corporation subcontracted the task of manufacturing the canards, stabilizers and fins to Hindustan Aeronautics Limited. As part of the contract agreement, Russia sent the first Malaysian cosmonaut to the International Space Station. It was a project initiated under the government-to-government offset agreement through the purchase of Su-30MKM fighter jets for the Royal Malaysian Air Force. Under this agreement the Russian Federation bore the cost of training two Malaysians for space travel and for sending one to the International Space Station (ISS) in October 2007 under the Angkasawan program.

The first two aircraft were handed over to the RMAF in May 2007 at Irkut's aircraft manufacturing facility at Irkutsk, Russia. The two aircraft were later delivered to RMAF Gong Kedak, Malaysia in June 2007 by an An-124-100 transport aircraft. By December 2007, seven months after the delivery of the first two aircraft, the RMAF had taken delivery of six Su-30MKMs. The eighteenth and last aircraft arrived at RMAF Gong Kedak in August 2009.

In 2016, Su-30MKM successfully dropped a GBU-12 Paveway laser-guided bomb in a firing exercise. An aircraft registered number M52-08 successfully dropped the bombs at Kota Belud firing range in Sabah on 27 November 2016. This makes it the first Russian-made Sukhoi combat aircraft compatible with the weapon.

According to Malaysian defense Minister Mohamad Sabu, Malaysia has grounded 14 of 18 Su-30MKM due to engine problems and unavailability of spare parts in 2018. To overcome this problem and increase the readiness of the Su-30MKM fleets, Malaysia has approved the budget worth RM2.2 billion for the Su-30MKM to be upgraded locally by Aerospace Technology Systems Corporation. The first upgraded aircraft was received in 2019 in LIMA 2019 exhibition. The program was completed in January 2025.

== Design ==
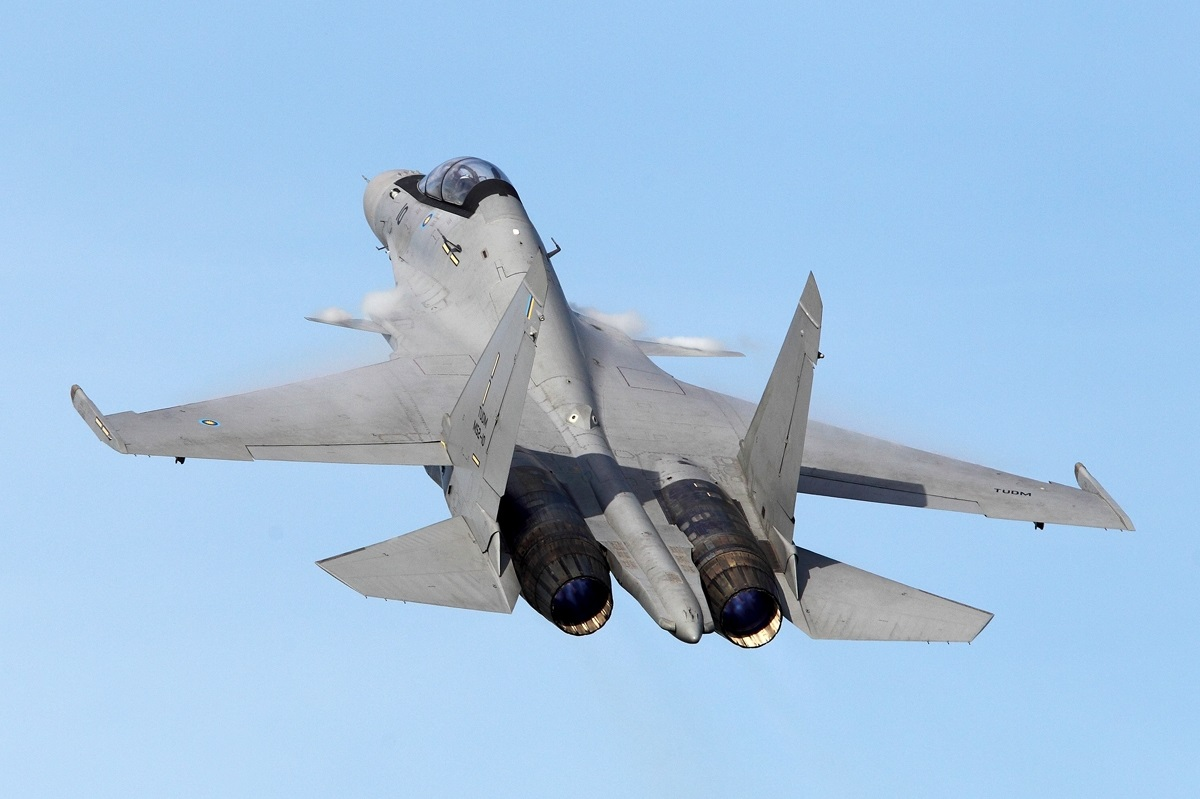
Su-30MKM from rear

The Su-30MKM was developed by the Sukhoi Design Bureau and is based on the Su-30MKI. The MKM version differs from the MKI mainly in the composition of its onboard avionics. Thales Group supplies the Head-up display (HUD), navigational forward-looking IR system NAVFLIR and the Damocles targeting pod. The aircraft carries missile approach warning sensor (MAWS) and laser warning sensor (LWS) manufactured by Avitronics (South Africa). It can carry up to 8,000 kg/ 17,650 lb of weapons and payloads over 700 nmi unrefueled combat radius.

The Su-30MKM can legitimately claim super-maneuverability via digital fly-by-wire, canards, and two Saturn AL-31FP engines with thrust vectoring producing 27,500 lb thrust each with afterburners. This gives them an edge in close-in dogfights, allowing the pilot to rapidly point the plane at potential targets to draw them within the AA-11/R-73 Archer’s wide infrared seeker cone, then launch and quickly change energy state and direction.

The electronic warfare (EW) systems, phased array radars, and optical-location systems with laser rangefinder were all produced by leading Russian manufacturers. At that time, officers from the RMAF formed a Su-30MKM Project Team which was based in Moscow; the team actively participated in the integration of all the avionics systems. The aircraft is capable of conducting SEAD missions when equipped with two KNIRTI SAP-518 jamming pods and Kh-31P anti-radiation missiles. The KNIRTI SAP-518 covers NATO surface-to-air and air-to-air threats in the G-J bands. It is equipped with NIIP N011M phased array radar for long range aerial combat which can track up to 15 targets and engage four targets simultaneously. It can also be equipped with a Thales Damocles Laser Designation surveillance and targeting Pod for precision ground attack. It has a rear-facing radar, Thales HUD, and French NAVFLIR (Navigation Forward Looking Infra-red). Missile Approach Warning System (MAWS) and laser warning sensor (LWS) are supplied by Avitronics of South Africa.

=== Upgrades ===
India proposed an upgrade package for Su-30MKMs based on uprated MKI weapon systems, such as avionics modernisation, technical training and the integration of Astra Mk.1 missiles due to lack of access to Russia from sanctions. This includes the possibility of sending the Su-30MKMs to India for maintenance.

== Operational History ==
From 5–8 August 2024, Su-30MKMs participated with Exercise Udara Shakti with the Sukhoi Su-30MKIs of the Indian Air Force. On 12 November 2024, during a historic State Partnership engagement with the Royal Malaysian Air Force at RMAF Subang Air Base in Malaysia, an American KC-135 Stratotanker assigned to the 141st Air Refueling Wing of Washington Air National Guard refuelled three of the Russian made-Sukhoi Su-30MKM aircraft.

The Su-30MKMs were first deployed in 2016 for the Singapore Airshow.

From 3-6 February 2026, the Su-30MKMs returned to the Singapore Airshow 2026.

In August 2026, the RMAF and IAF participated in this year's Udara Shakti with two Su-30MKM aircraft from No 12 Squadron, two F/A-18D aircraft from No 18 Squadron and one A400M from No 8 Squadron.

== Operators ==
Malaysia

- Royal Malaysian Air Force - 18 Su-30MKMs in inventory.
  - RMAF Gong Kedak
    - 12th Squadron

== Specifications (Su-30MKM) ==
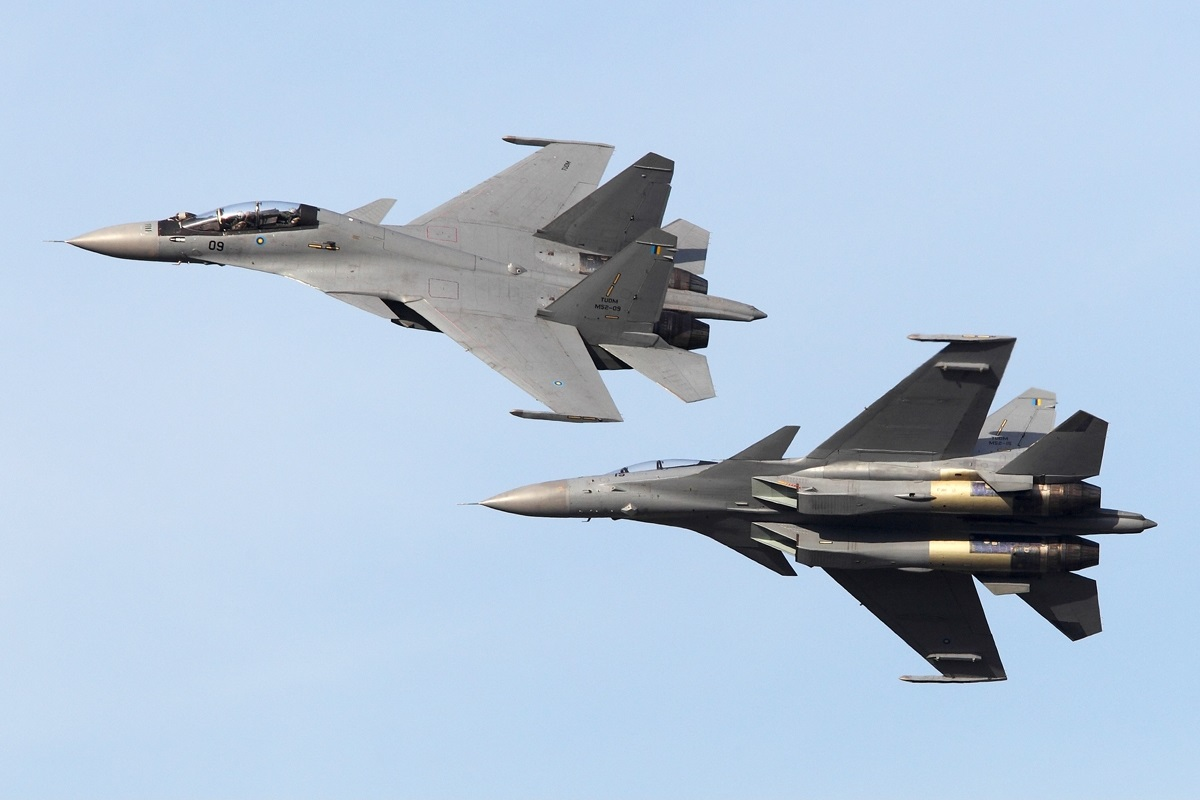
Su-30MKM seen from top and bottom

Data from Irkut Corporation, Sukhoi

General characteristics

- Crew: 2
- Length: 21.935 m (72 ft 0 in)
- Wingspan: 14.7 m (48 ft 3 in)
- Height: 6.36 m (20 ft 10 in)
- Wing area: 62 m^{2} (670 sq ft)
- Empty weight: 18,400 kg (40,565 lb)
- Gross weight: 26,090 kg (57,519 lb) typical mission weight
- Max takeoff weight: 38,800 kg (85,539 lb)
- Powerplant: 2 × Lyulka AL-31FP afterburning turbofan engines, 123 kN (28,000 lbf) with afterburner

Performance

- Maximum speed: 2,120 km/h (1,320 mph, 1,140 kn) / M2.0 at high altitude

1,350 km/h (840 mph; 730 kn) / M1.09 at low altitude

- Range: 3,000 km (1,900 mi, 1,600 nmi) at high altitude

1,270 km (790 mi; 690 nmi) at low altitude

- Ferry range: 8,000 km (5,000 mi, 4,300 nmi) with two in-flight refuellings
- Service ceiling: 17,300 m (56,800 ft)
- g limits: +9g
- Rate of climb: 300 m/s (59,000 ft/min) +
- Wing loading: 401 kg/m^{2} (82 lb/sq ft)
- Thrust/weight: 0.96

Armament

- Guns: 1 × 30 mm Gryazev-Shipunov GSh-30-1 autocannon
- Hardpoints: 12 hardpoints (2 × wingtip AAM rails, 6 × under-wing pylons, 2 × pylon under-engine nacelles, and 2 × pylons in tandem in the "arch" between the engines. It can be increased to 14 using multiple ejector racks.) with a capacity of up to 8,130 kg (17,920 lb), with provisions to carry combinations of:
  - Rockets:
    - 4 × B-8 rocket pods for 80 × S-8 rockets
    - 4 × B-13 rocket pods for 20 × S-13 rockets
  - Missiles:
    - Air-to-air missiles:
      - 10 × R-77
      - 6 × R-27ER/ET
      - 2 × R-27R/T
      - 6 × R-73
    - Air-to-surface missiles:
      - 3 × Kh-59ME
      - 6 × Kh-29T/L
    - Anti-ship missiles:
      - 3 × Kh-59MK
      - 4 × Kh-31A
    - Anti-radiation missiles:
      - 6 × Kh-31P
  - Bombs:
    - 8 × KAB-500L laser-guided bombs
    - 3 × KAB-1500L laser-guided bombs
    - 8 × FAB-500T bombs
    - 28 × OFAB-250-270 bombs
    - 32 × OFAB-100-120 bombs
    - 4 × GBU-12 Paveway II laser-guided bomb

Avionics

- Bars N011M passive electronically scanned array radar
- Damocles targeting pod
- SAP-518 electronic countermeasure pod
- MAW-300 Missile Approach Warning System
- RWS-50 Radar Warning Receiver
- LWS310 Laser Warning System

== See also ==
Related development

- Sukhoi Su-30
- Sukhoi Su-30MKA
- Sukhoi Su-30MKI
- Sukhoi Su-30MKK

Related lists

- List of fighter aircraft
- List of aircraft of the Royal Malaysian Air Force
