= Gading Marine FIC / FAC =

Combat boat

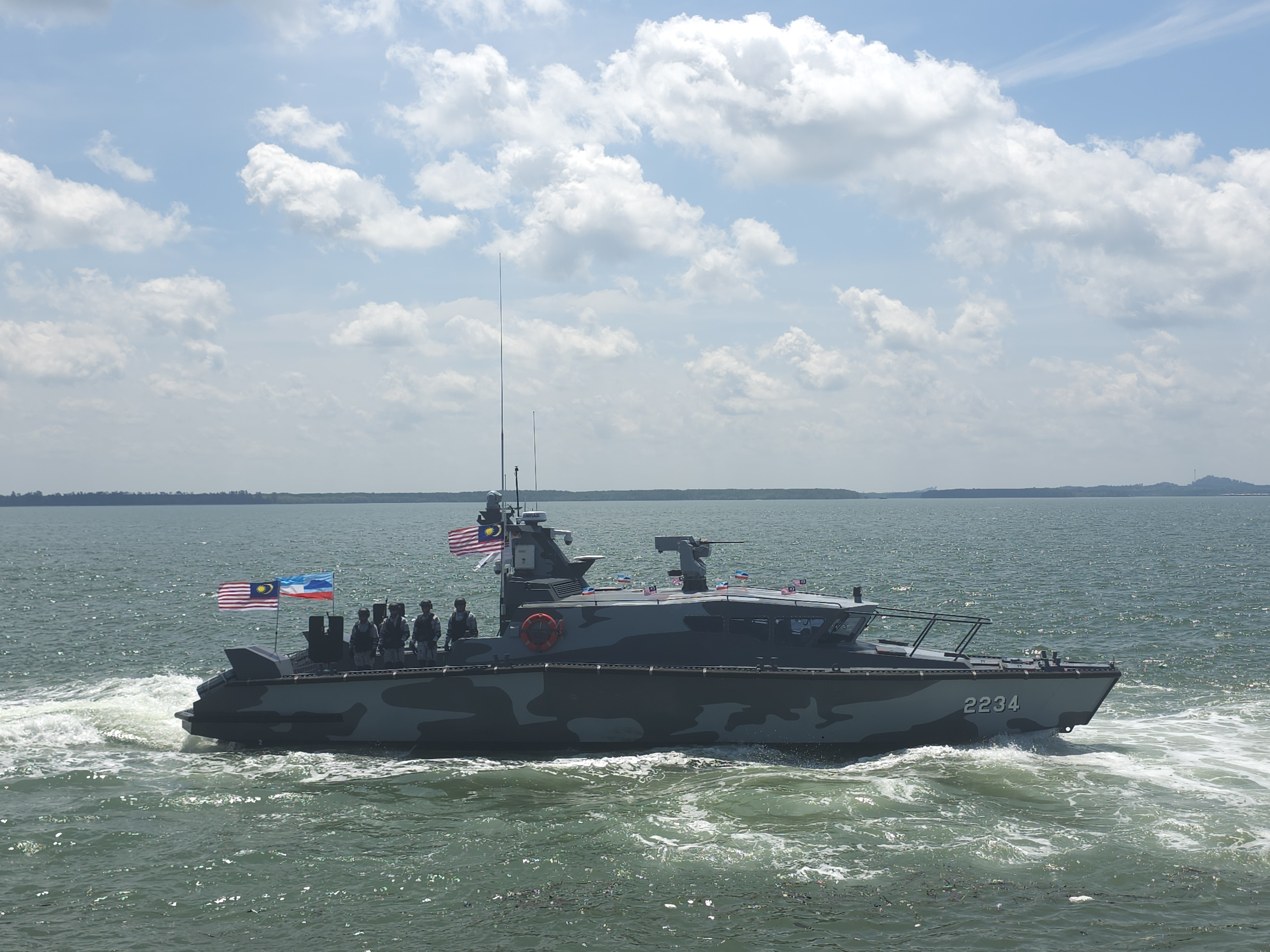
- Gading Marine G2000 in demonstration

Class overview
- Name: Gading Marine FIC/FAC
- Builders: Gading Marine
- Operators: Royal Malaysia Police; Royal Malaysian Navy

General characteristics
- Displacement: 26 tonnes
- Length: 18 m (59 ft)
- Beam: 4.6 m (15 ft 1 in)
- Draught: 1.2 m (3 ft 11 in)
- Propulsion: Main engine: 2 × MAN V12 1650hp Water jet: 2 x Hamilton HTX42 water jet
- Speed: 52 knots (96 km/h)
- Range: 350 nmi (650 km)
- Complement: 3 + 5
- Sensors & processing systems: Multi-function radar Navigation radar AIS; FLIR; HF radio VHF radio Intercom
- Armament: 1 x 12.7 mm Sentinel RCWS; 2 × 7.62 mm machine guns
- Notes: Source :

Gading Marine FIC / FAC is a combat boat made by Malaysian company Gading Marine. Its results of collaboration with New Zealand Naval Architects designer, LOMOcean Marine. The boats currently in service with Royal Malaysia Police (RMP) and Royal Malaysian Navy (RMN).

== Development ==
After the intrusion in Lahad Datu, Sabah in 2013, Malaysia desperately needs a fast interceptor craft for its security forces to patrol the shallow waters and tight area in Sabah. The establishment of ESSCOM and ESSZONE and ongoing Ops Benteng also makes the acquisition of this combat boat very important. This combat boat is currently in service with Royal Malaysia Police under the name of Gading Marine FAC PC 31. In October 2020, Royal Malaysian Navy has ordered G2000 FIC 18m version for its fast interceptor craft acquisition project.

== Variants ==
=== G2000 Fast Assault Craft (FAC) 18m Class / FAC PC 31 ===
This variant in service with Royal Malaysia Police. It has a length of 17.6 meters and a beam of 4.6 meters with 1.0 meters draught and can be equipped with 12.7 mm machine gun and 7.62 mm machine gun. Its powered by two MAN V8 1200 hp main engines and can reach to the maximum speed of 45 knots.

=== G2000 MK I Fast Interceptor Craft (FIC) 18m Class ===
6 ordered by Royal Malaysian Navy in 2020. It has a length of 18 meters and a beam of 4.6 meters with 1.2 meters draught. Armed with one 12.7 mm Sentinel RCWS and two 7.62 mm machine guns. Its powered by two MAN 1550 hp main engines and two Hamilton HM461 water jet and can reach to the maximum speed of 52 knots. This FAC also equipped with multi-function display radar, navigation radar, AIS, FLIR, HF radio, VHF radio and intercom.

=== G2000 MK II Fast Interceptor Craft (FIC) 18m Class ===
13 ordered by Royal Malaysian Navy in 2022. Different in powerpack specification. Powered by two MAN V12 1650 hp main engines and two Hamilton HTX42 water jet. Top speed of 50 knots.

== Operators ==
Malaysia

- Royal Malaysia Police
- Royal Malaysian Navy
