= Nurol =

Nurol may refer to:

- Nurol Bank, Turkish banking company
- Nurol Ejder, family of Turkish armoured vehicles from
- Nurol Holding, Turkish industrial conglomerate
- Nurol Teknoloji, Turkish ceramics and ballistic products
