= FNSS ACV-19 =

ACV-19
- Type: Armored combat vehicle
- Place of origin: Turkey

Service history
- Used by: Turkey; Malaysia; Jordan; UAE

Production history
- Manufacturer: FNSS Defence Systems; DefTech

Specifications
- Mass: 18 tonnes
- Length: 6.02 m (19.8 ft)
- Width: 2.94 m (9.6 ft)
- Height: 2.69 m (8.8 ft)
- Crew: 3 + 9
- Armor: Protection against 14.5×114mm armor-piercing rounds
- Main armament: 25mm FNSS Sharpshooter Turret
- Secondary armament: 7.62mm Machine gun
- Engine: Detroit Diesel Model 6V-53T; 350 hp
- Suspension: torsion bar 350 mm
- Operational range: 490 km (300 mi)
- Maximum speed: 65 km/h (40 mph)

The ACV-19 is an infantry fighting vehicle currently offered by FNSS Defence Systems of Turkey. The vehicle was previously known as the Armoured Combat Vehicle — Stretched.

The ACV-19 is a further development of the ACV-15, which is developed from the M113 series of armoured personnel carriers built by United Defense of the United States. The vehicle is in service with Turkey and has obtained export orders from Jordan, Malaysia, and the United Arab Emirates.

== Development ==
The two prototypes were completed in 1998 and 2000.

== Description ==
The ACV-S retains the basic shape of the M113, although it is actually derived from the ACV-300, an infantry fighting vehicle derived itself from the M113. The ACV-S retains a high number of common parts with the M113. The primary difference is the addition of an extra roadwheel, lengthening the body, and allowing for greater weight. This permits an increase in armour protection as well as the ability to install a larger turret. However, the vehicle remains air-portable on many western aircraft, including the C-130 Hercules, C-5 Galaxy, C-141 Starlifter, and C-17 Globemaster III.

The hull is both longer and wider than previous versions. Compared with the original M113, the ACV-S has 25% more internal space and can support 75% more weight. On the infantry fighting vehicle version (the primary version of the program), the passenger compartment is fitted with bench seating along the center of the space, with access via a powered rear ramp (a door is fitted within the ramp). The vehicle is air conditioned and fitted with an over-pressure system for NBC protection. The driver is seated in the front left of the hull, with the engine mounted to their right.

Armor protection is sufficient to defeat rounds up to 14.5 mm. Additional armor can be added however to increase protection against rounds up to 30 mm, as well as to defeat light rockets such as the RPG-7. 18 mm of armor as well as spall liners are provided for the floor of the vehicle to defend against mines.
