= Nurol Holding =

Industrial conglomerate in Turkey

Nurol Holding A.Ş.
- Type: Anonim Şirket
- Founded: Turkey (1989)
- Key people: Nurettin Çarmıklı (Chairman); Erol Çarmıklı (Vice Chairman); M. Oğuz Çarmıklı (Vice Chairman)
- Revenue: ▼$1.51 billion (2023)
- Operating income: ▼$399 million (2023)
- Net income: ▼$201.41 million (2023)
- Total assets: ▼$4.79 billion (2023)
- Total equity: ▲$1.68 billion (2023)
- Number of employees: 9,495 (2023)
- Website: Nurol Holding website

Nurol Holding is an industrial conglomerate in Turkey operating in the construction, defence manufacturing, energy, investment banking and tourism industries. Its core business is construction; Nurol Construction was founded in 1966. It is privately owned, with equal shares held by three members of the Çarmıklı family. The Holding was established in 1989.

The company's 35th anniversary celebration in 2001 was attended by former Prime Minister and President of Turkey Suleyman Demirel. In 2007, it considered entering the media sector by participating in the Sabah-ATV tender, but decided it against it after reviewing the companies' financials.

== Companies ==
Nurol's companies include:

- Nurol Construction and Trading (Nurol İnşaat ve Ticaret A.Ş.)
  - Projects include the İzmit Bay Bridge, and leadership of the Ilısu Dam construction consortium
- Nurol Makina ve Sanayi A.S. (founded 1976) – industrial and defence manufacturing.
  - Specializes in 4x4 tactical wheeled armored vehicles such as the Nurol Ejder and the TOMA water cannon.
- FNSS Defence Systems (FNSS Savunma Sistemleri A.Ş.) – defence manufacturing; a joint venture with BAE Systems Inc.
  - Products include armored combat vehicles and weapon systems like the FNSS Pars, ACV-300, and AZMİM.
- Nurol Teknoloji – advanced technical ceramics and ballistic protection systems.
  - Products include ceramic-based armor for personnel (vests, helmets), land vehicles, and aerial platforms using boron carbide and silicon carbide.
- Nurol Yatırım Bankası – investment banking based in Maslak
- Nurol Real Estate (Nurol Gayrimenkul Yatırım Ortaklığı, quoted on the Istanbul Stock Exchange as NUGYO)
  - Notable investments include Hurriyets headquarters, acquired for $127m in 2012
- Turser (tourism)
  - Owns Sheraton Turkey, which includes the Sheraton Ankara
