= AV8 =

AV8 may refer to:

- Hawker Siddeley Harrier, a vertical jet fighter
- McDonnell Douglas AV-8B Harrier II, a second generation vertical jet fighter
- DefTech AV8, an armoured vehicle
- AV8, a music label known for club mixes
