= FNSS Pars =

Turkish armoured combat vehicle

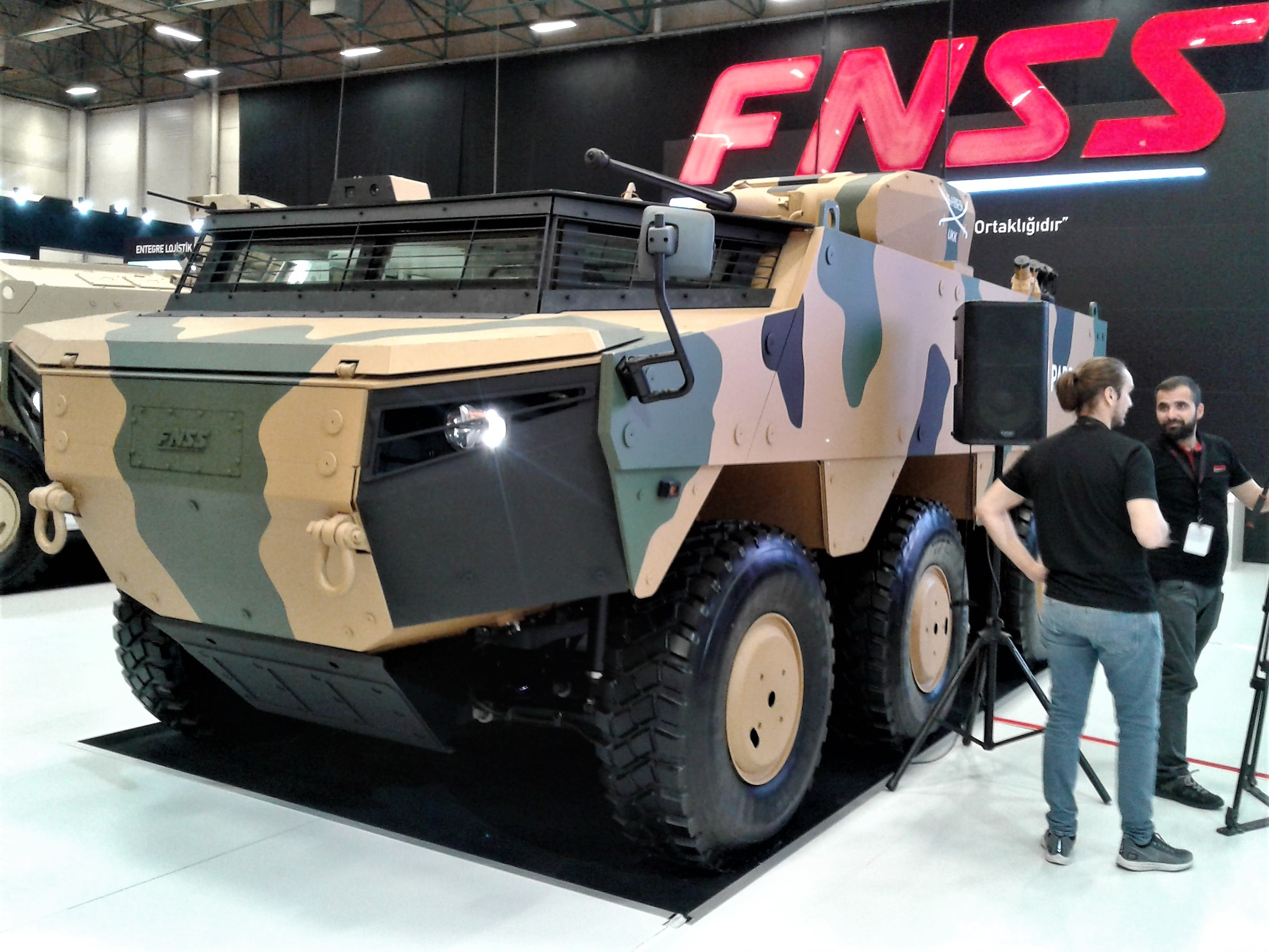
- FNSS Pars 6x6
- Type: Armoured combat vehicle
- Place of origin: Turkey

Service history
- In service: 2005 – Present
- Used by: See Operators

Production history
- Designer: FNSS Defence Systems
- Manufacturer: FNSS Defence Systems
- Produced: 2005 – present
- No. built: 172 (6x6) & (8x8) ordered by Oman
- Variants: Armored personnel carrier, Infantry fighting vehicle

Specifications
- Mass: 16,130-24,500 kg
- Length: 5 m (FNSS Pars 4x4), 6.6 m (FNSS Pars 6×6), 8 m (FNSS Pars8×8), 8,11 m (GPV Colonel), 9,26 m (GPV General)
- Width: 2.7 m
- Height: 2.17 m
- Crew: 5 (FNSS Pars 4x4), 10 (FNSS Pars 6×6), 14 (FNSS Pars 8×8), 14 (GPV Colonel), 18 (GPV General)
- Armor: Baseline 7.62mm AP all-around up to STANAG 4569 Level 4
- Main armament: 25 mm FNSS Sharpshooter Turret
- Secondary armament: 7.62 mm coaxial machine gun
- Engine: Deutz or Caterpillar Diesel; 500-600 hp (6×6 and 8×8)
- Power/weight: 20.4 to 24.5 hp/ton
- Suspension: semi-automatic computer-controlled pneumatic suspension
- Operational range: 1,000 km (620 mi)
- Maximum speed: 100 km/h (62 mph) on land, 8 km/h (4.97 mph) on water

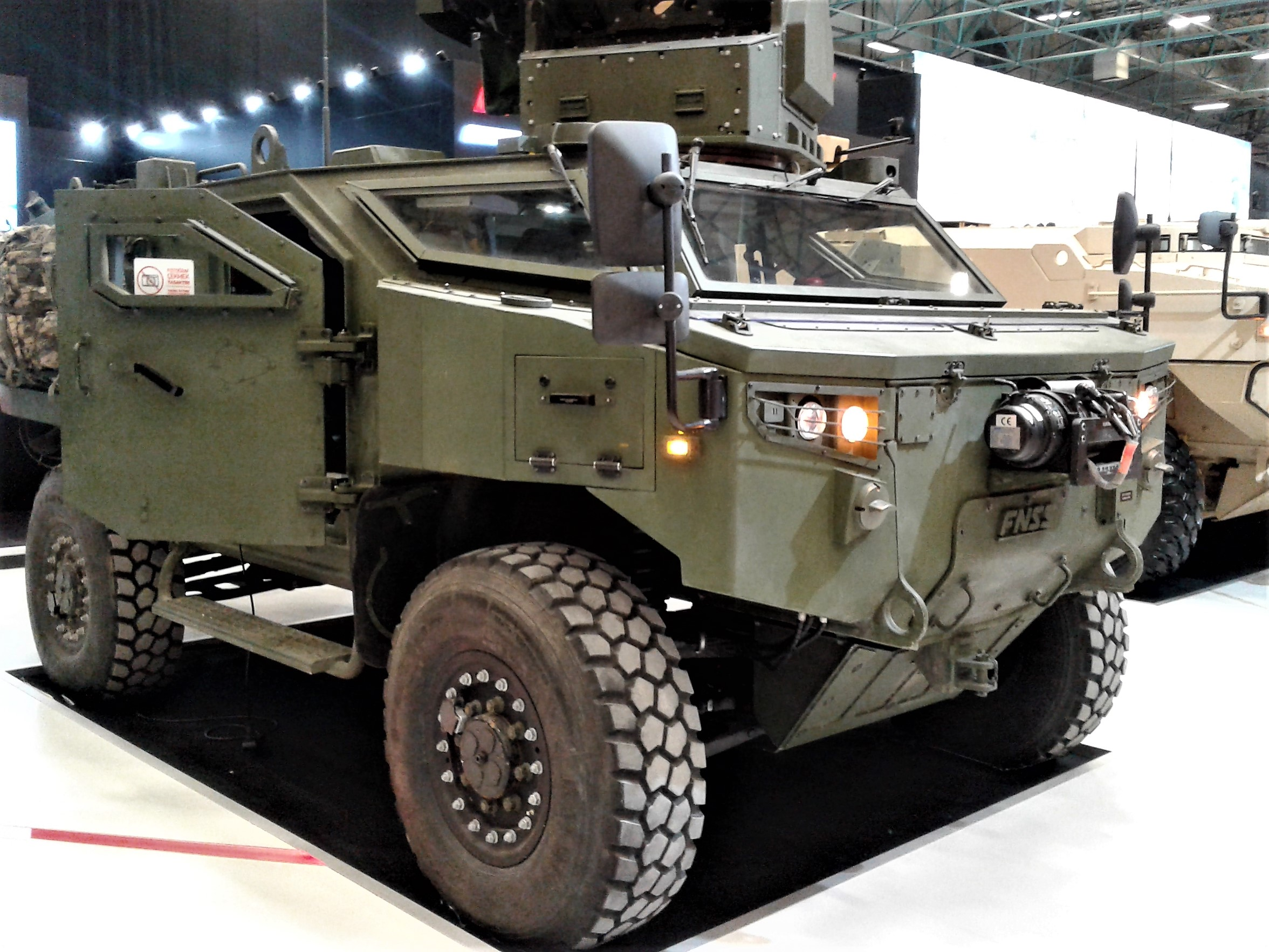
FNSS Pars 4x4 anti-tank at the IDEF 2019.

The Pars (Turkish for Anatolian leopard) is an amphibious heavily armoured combat vehicle family with 4×4, 6×6 and 8×8 versions, produced by FNSS Defence Systems of Turkey.

== Development ==
The development of the Pars vehicles commenced in 2002, based on a design by US company GPV (General Purpose Vehicles), and in cooperation with GPV. Pars 4×4 and Pars 6×6 are being proposed for the Turkish Army. Pars 8×8 was first displayed in February 2005 during the IDEX defence equipment exhibition held in Abu Dhabi. GPV offered 2 more technically different vehicles, the 8×8 GPV Colonel and the 10×10 GPV General. Since the first Pars vehicles were shown in 2005 development and further enhancements have been carried out on a continuous basis.

It was demonstrated in the deserts of the UAE in 2008 covering 11,000 km of desert and road trials. Further testing was again carried out in the UAE deserts in 2010. The Pars 8x8, fitted with a 25mm gun turret, was also successfully tested by another Middle Eastern country in the summer of 2010.

On March 29, 2022, FNSS and Deftech proposed the Pars III 6×6 for Malaysian military service.

== Design ==
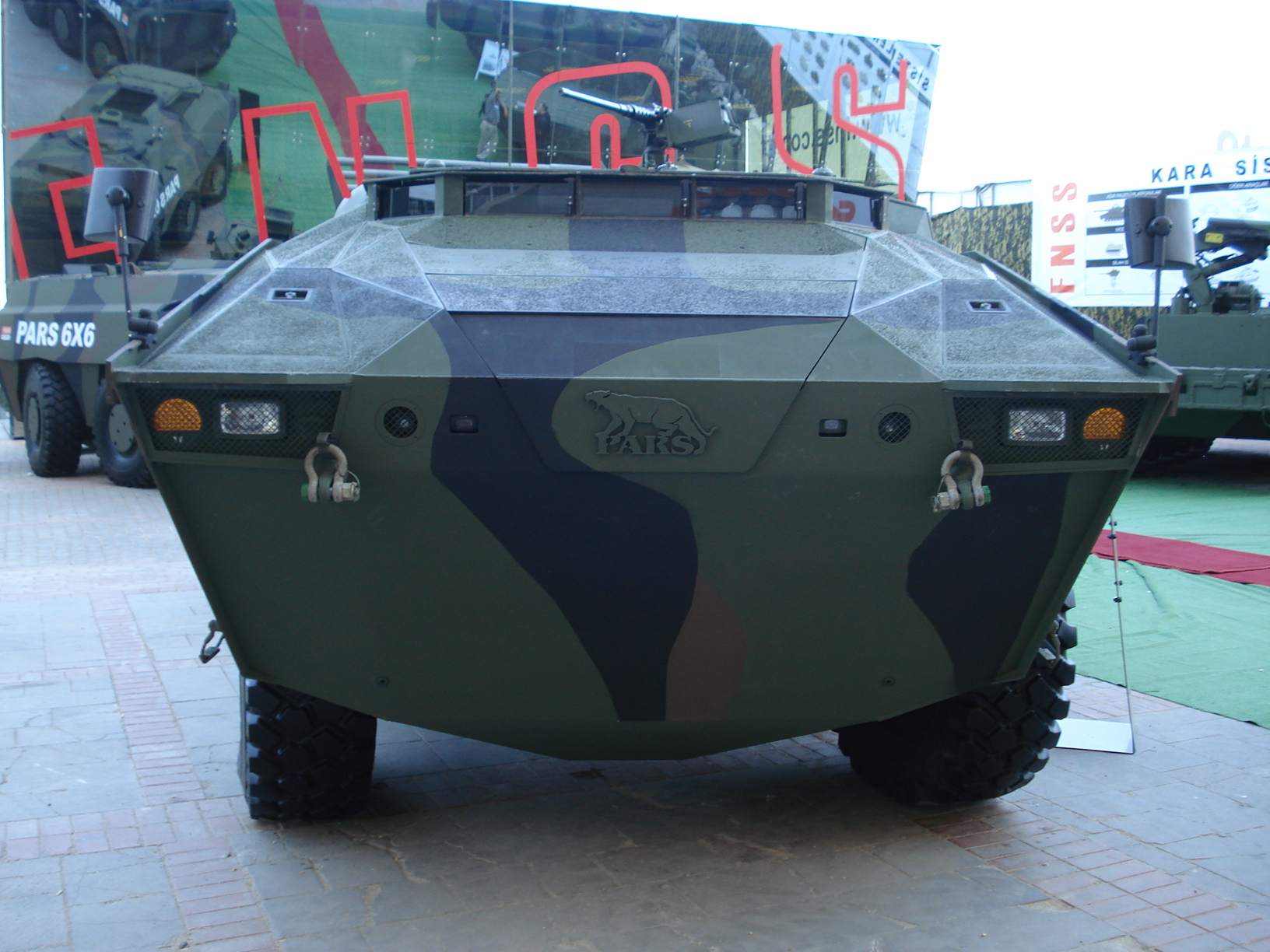
Front view of FNSS Pars 8x8.

The baseline Pars has a hull consisting of a steel armour.

The driver and commander are seated in a cockpit at the front of the vehicle. Each has a single-piece roof hatch that opens to the side. Both have access to flat-panel displays, on which all relevant information is shown. The seating arrangement depends on the role but the troops are normally seated on individual seats down each side of the hull facing inwards. These shock-absorbing seats are fitted with five-point seatbelts as standard. A large ramp fitted at the rear section will be used for entry and exit of troops.

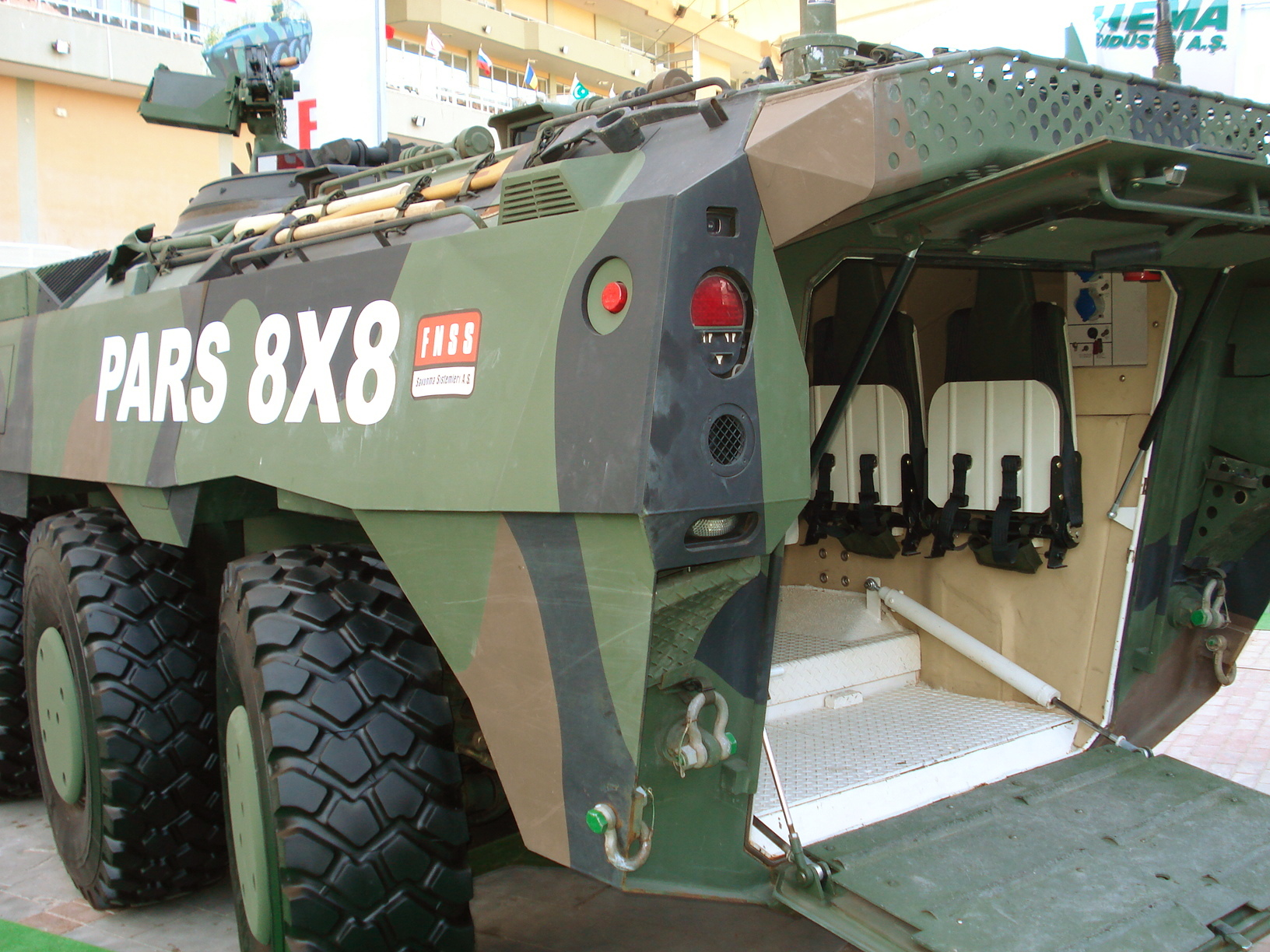
FNSS Pars 8x8 rear view.

The modular design of the Pars will incorporate external turrets or weapon stations depending on user requirements. It could be a one or two-man turret or a remotely operated weapon station. To allow for Pars to be rapidly reconfigured for different operational roles, all members of the Pars family have removable roofing so that they can be quickly converted for a wide range of specialist roles.

== Variants ==
- Pars 4×4 Wheeled armoured vehicle : The Pars 4×4 is designed to undertake special operational roles such as advanced surveillance, anti-tank and command and control.
- Pars III 6×6 Wheeled armoured combat vehicle : The Pars III 6×6 has been developed with a special emphasis on mobility, protection, payload, and growth potential. It is equipped with cutting edge armoured vehicle technologies to obtain performances and durability answering modern armies’ operational requirements.
- Pars III 8×8 Wheeled armoured combat vehicle : The Pars III 8×8 has been developed with special emphasis on mobility, protection, payload, and growth potential. It is equipped with cutting edge armoured vehicle technologies to obtain performances and durability answering modern armies operational requirements.
- Pars Scout 6×6 Special Purpose vehicle : The Pars SCOUT is special purpose tactical wheeled vehicle, which provide high mobility in all terrain conditions and superior ballistic and mine protection and is equipped with modern technologies, providing strategic advantages to their users, including a high situational awareness.
- Pars Scout 8×8 Special Purpose vehicle : The Pars SCOUT 8×8 is modern tactical wheeled armoured combat vehicle, which is designed to be used in low and high intensity scenarios, offering strategic advantages to the user thanks to its unique features, and incorporate the most advanced technologies.
- Pars IV 6×6 Special Operations vehicle : The Pars IV 6×6 Special Operation’s (S-Ops) Vehicle, which is designed to meet the tactical and operational requirements of military and internal security forces whose mission is special. It is able to operate in a wide range of terrains, climate types and is optimized for different operational requirements. It is highly versatile, reflecting the broad spectrum of potential missions and areas of operation.
- Pars IV 8×8 New-Generation Wheeled armoured vehicle : The Pars IV 8×8 NG-WAV is vehicle, which is developed to adapt to today and future hybrid warfare conditions that bring together symmetric and asymmetric threats. The Pars IV 8×8 NG-WAV offers a combination of the highest mobility and protection of the Pars family and the ability to engage the evolving threats of the modern battlefield.
- Pars ALPHA 8×8 New-Generation Armoured fighting vehicle : FNSS Pars ALPHA 8×8, is a New Generation Armoured Fighting Vehicle designed to surpass the most challenging tactical and operational requirements. Built for full-spectrum dominance, it represents the future of military engagement, by meeting the most challenging mission objectives to fulfil tactical and superior combat performance.

=== AV8 Gempita ===
The Pars 8×8 vehicle was examined by the Malaysian Army competing with the Swiss Mowag Piranha and the Finnish Patria AMV for the implementation of technology to the first Malaysian indigenous armoured vehicle. AV8 Gempita was the result of Malaysian-Turkey collaboration in Malaysia's first indigenous armoured vehicle project with the implementation of Pars technology to its new army armoured vehicle.

== Operators ==
=== Current operators ===
- Oman - 172 vehicles in both 6×6 & 8×8 configuration. First delivery on 12 July 2017 and last in August 2020.
- Turkey - Approx.100 Pars Scout 8×8 on order. 12 Pars Pars IV 6×6 in service. 136 Pars 4×4 in service.
- Malaysia - 257 DefTech AV8 Gempita 8×8 based on FNSS Pars.

=== Potential operators ===
- Azerbaijan
- Kosovo - 60 Pars III IFV in 6×6 configuration. The Kosovo Ministry of Defense signed a Letter of Request worth €70.000.000 with Turkish defense company FNSS for the supply of Pars III 6×6 IFV with integrated Saber 25mm Turret and FNSS SANCAK RCWS.

== See also ==
=== Comparable vehicles ===
- Stryker – (United States, Canada)
- LAV
  - LAV III – (Canada)
  - LAV AFV – (Canada)
  - LAV-25 – (Canada)
  - ASLAV – (Australia)
- K808 White Tiger – (South Korea)
- Boxer – (Germany, Netherlands)
- Freccia IFV – (Italy)
- BTR-90 – (Russia)
- Clouded Leopard – (Taiwan)
- Type 96 armored personnel carrier – (Japan)
  - Type 16 maneuver combat vehicle – (Japan)
- Patria AMV – (Finland)
- BTR-4 – (Ukraine)
- Saur 2 – (Romania)
- TATA Kestrel – (India)
- VBCI – (France)
- KTO Rosomak – (Poland)
- MOWAG Piranha – (Switzerland)
