= DefTech AV8 =

Malaysian armoured combat vehicle

DefTech AV8 Gempita
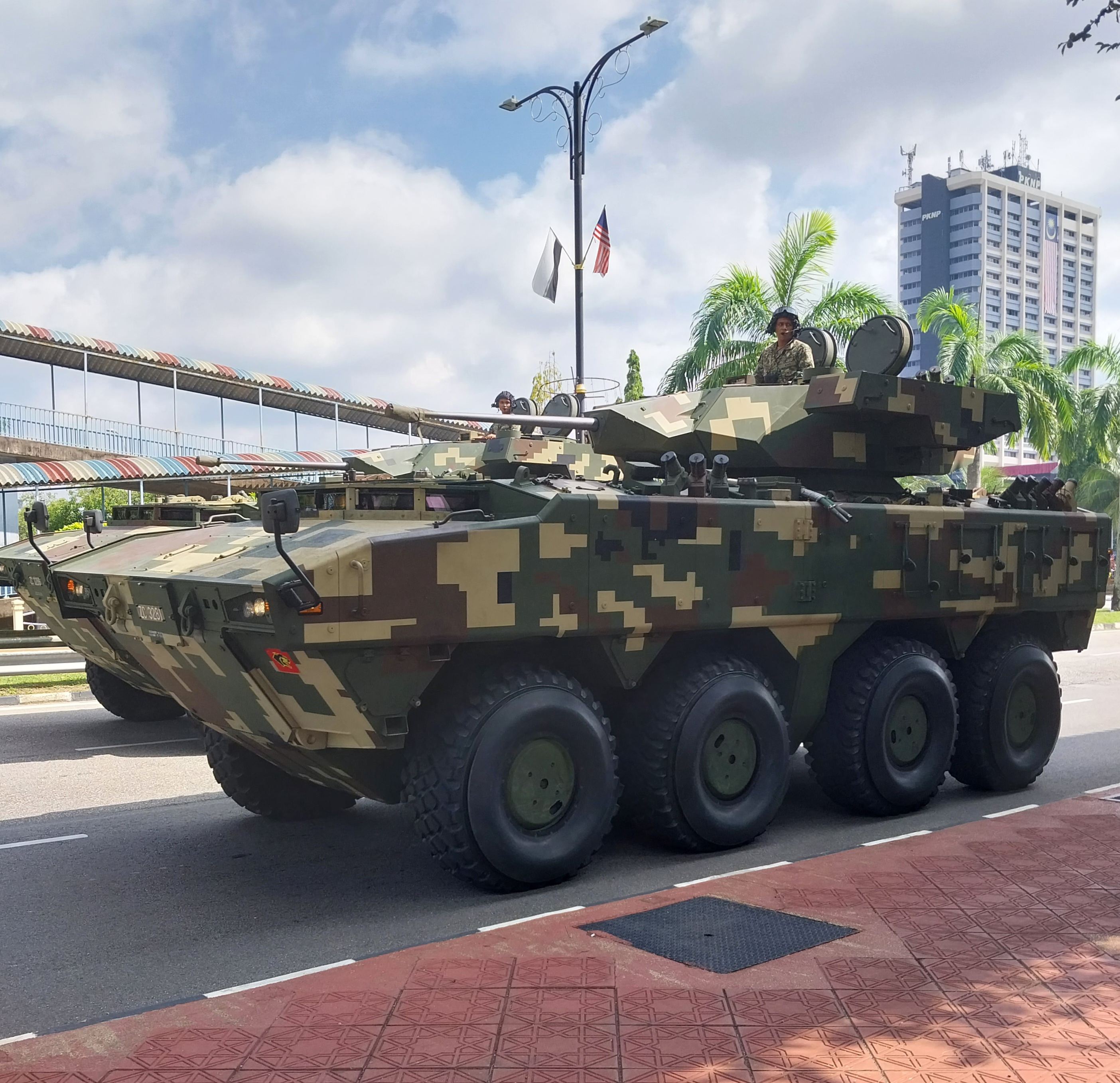
- DefTech AV8 Gempita being paraded on Malaysia's National Day Parade
- Type: Armoured fighting vehicle
- Place of origin: Malaysia

Service history
- In service: 2014-present
- Used by: Malaysian Army

Production history
- Designer: DefTech; FNSS Defence Systems
- Manufacturer: DefTech
- No. built: 257
- Variants: See variants

Specifications
- Mass: ± 28,000 - 30,000 kg
- Length: 8 m
- Width: 2.7 m (not incl. side armour)
- Height: 2.17 m (hull top)
- Crew: 3 + 11 soldiers
- Armor: Composite aluminium and steel armour, add-on armour at front and sides of the hull up to STANAG 4569 Level 4
- Main armament: 30mm Denel LCT30 turret or 25mm Sharpshooter turret
- Secondary armament: FN Herstal MAG 58M coaxial 7.62 mm machine gun and 4 ZT3 Ingwe anti tank missile for LCT30 turret
- Engine: Deutz TCD 2015 V6 diesel 550 hp
- Power/weight: 18.3-19.6 HP/ton
- Suspension: Independent air suspension system
- Operational range: 700 km (430 mi)
- Maximum speed: 100 km/h on road 6 km/h in water

The DefTech AV8 Gempita (Thunder) is an amphibious multirole armoured vehicle developed by Malaysian defence company DefTech with the assistance of Turkey defence company FNSS. The Gempita resembles some of the Turkey FNSS Pars design and technology. The vehicle has a modular design which allows the fitting of different turrets, weapons, sensors, and communications systems on the same vehicle.

The vehicle has 12 variants, including the armoured personnel carrier, infantry fighting vehicle, tank destroyer, signals intelligence vehicle and recovery vehicles.

The AV8 is manufactured by DefTech in Pahang, Malaysia.

== History ==
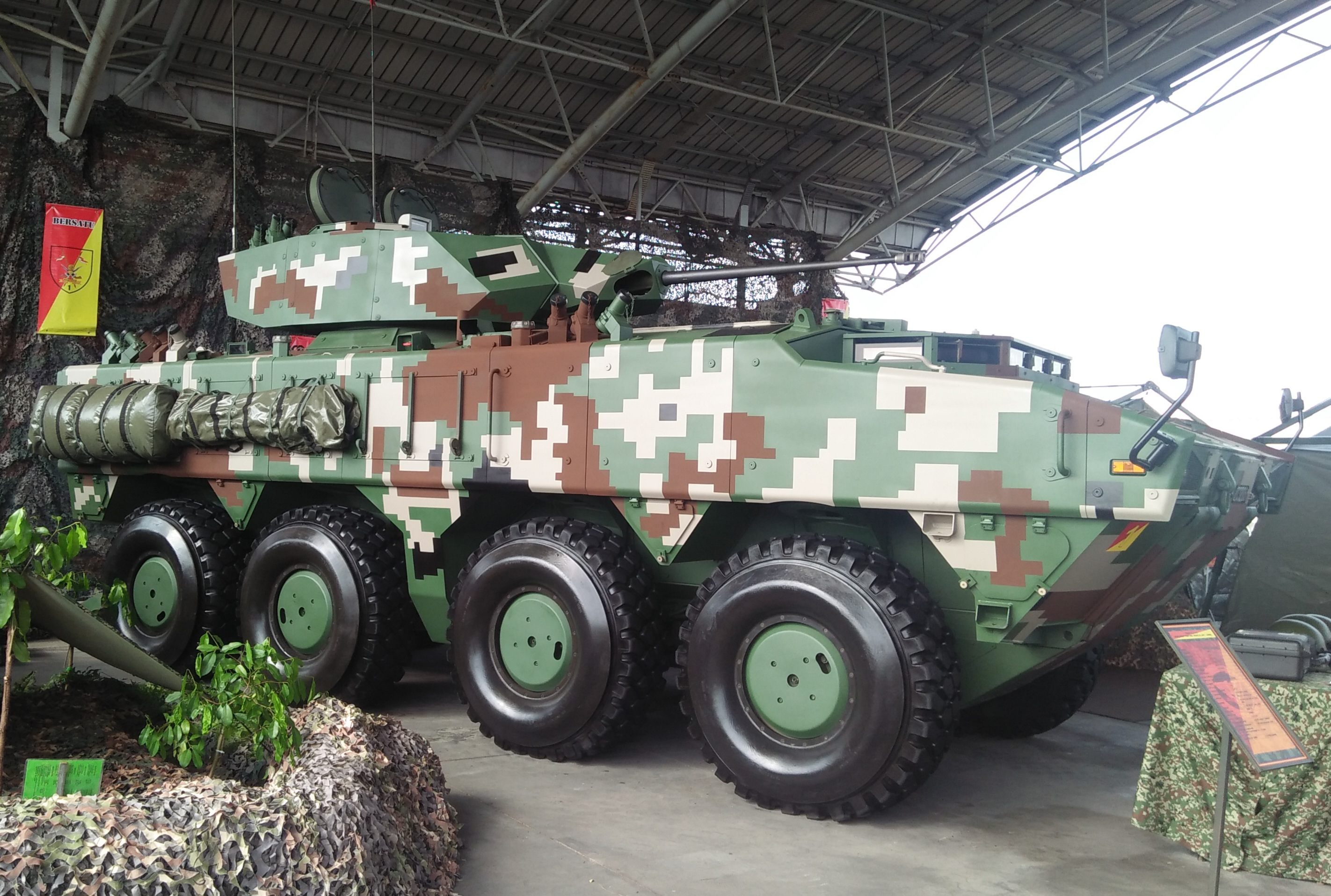
AV8 Gempita of Malaysian Army in digital camouflage

In June 2011, the Turkish Company FNSS signed a ‘letter of offer and acceptance’ by DRB-Hicom Defence Technologies (DefTech) for the assistance of design and development of the vehicles. The AV8 vehicle selected by the Malaysian military was based on the technology of FNSS-designed Pars 8×8 multi-purpose, multi-mission, wheeled armoured vehicle. The contract included technology transfer arrangements to Deftech and logistics support for the Malaysian army, positioning the vehicle and its 12 variants to become Malaysia's first indigenous family of 8×8 armoured wheeled vehicle.

In April 2012, DefTech and FNSS presented the first scale model of the AV8 at the international defence exhibition, Defence Services Asia 2012 in Kuala Lumpur. Malaysia's DefTech will be the principal manufacturer agent, and its engineers will work with Nurol holding subsidiary FNSS to customise the vehicles for Malaysian requirements and equipment. South Africa's Denel will reportedly build a 2-man turret for the APC, while local company joint venture, Sapura-Thales was expected to become the systems integrator. The first prototype of the AV8 was presented in March 2013 to the public during the 80th Army Day anniversary celebration in Port Dickson, Negeri Sembilan.

In April 2014, DefTech announced that the first 12 vehicles would start production in June 2014 and be delivered to the Malaysian Army by end of 2014. DefTech CEO Amril Samsudin also said that DefTech has received contracts from regional countries, like the test of some vehicle by Saudi armed forces.

In December 2014, the AV8 was officially inducted into service with the Malaysian Army in a ceremony at the DefTech plant in Pekan. This delivery of the first 12 units represents a significant milestone in the AV8 programme

The AV8s were all to be delivered to the Malaysian Army by 2020.

=== Export ===
DefTech is taking the first steps of exporting the AV8 Gempita. The company has sent at least one AV8 Gempita, which is the variant of AFV30 to Saudi Arabia for trials in August/September 2018.

=== Accident ===
In 2016, an AV8 was involved in an accident after a DefTech employee was killed during a roll over incident.

== Design ==
The driver and the commander seats are located at the front of the vehicle, the turret in the middle and the troop's compartment at the rear. There is three large day periscopes at the front position of driver and commander and one on each side that provide excellent visibility. Eleven infantrymen can be seated at the rear of the hull on individual seats down each side of the hull facing inwards. All shock-absorbing seats are fitted with five-point seatbelts as standard. Back of the driver and commander position, there is an access passage to the troop compartment at the right side of the hull. The troops leave and enter the vehicle via a large hydraulic ramp mounted at the rear of the hull.

=== Main features ===
- Two thermal cameras and CCD cameras in the front and rear, providing driver/commander with high situational awareness.
- Left or right hand drive steering.
- All wheel steer.
- All wheel driver.
- Anti-lock braking system (ABS).
- Modularity allowing use of common components among vehicle configurations.

=== Armour ===
The hull of the original Pars consisted of a composite aluminium and steel armour that provides protection for the crew and infantry against firing of small arms 7.62 mm armour-piercing attack through a full 360°. The AV8 has add-on armour at the front and sides to increase protection level to STANAG 4569 Level 4, with protection against 14.5mm rounds. The added armour weight resulted in the decrease of water speed from 8 km/h of original Pars to only 6 km/h. The anti tank version with LCT30 turret is not amphibious.

=== Sub systems ===
- Air conditioning
- NBC protection
- Automatic fire suppression system
- Land navigation system
- Various weapon stations
- Various mission equipment

== Variants ==
The AV8 will be delivered in 12 variants. A total of 124 units will be the IFV30 and IFV25 variants in the first batch of 257 AV8s.

=== AFV30 ===
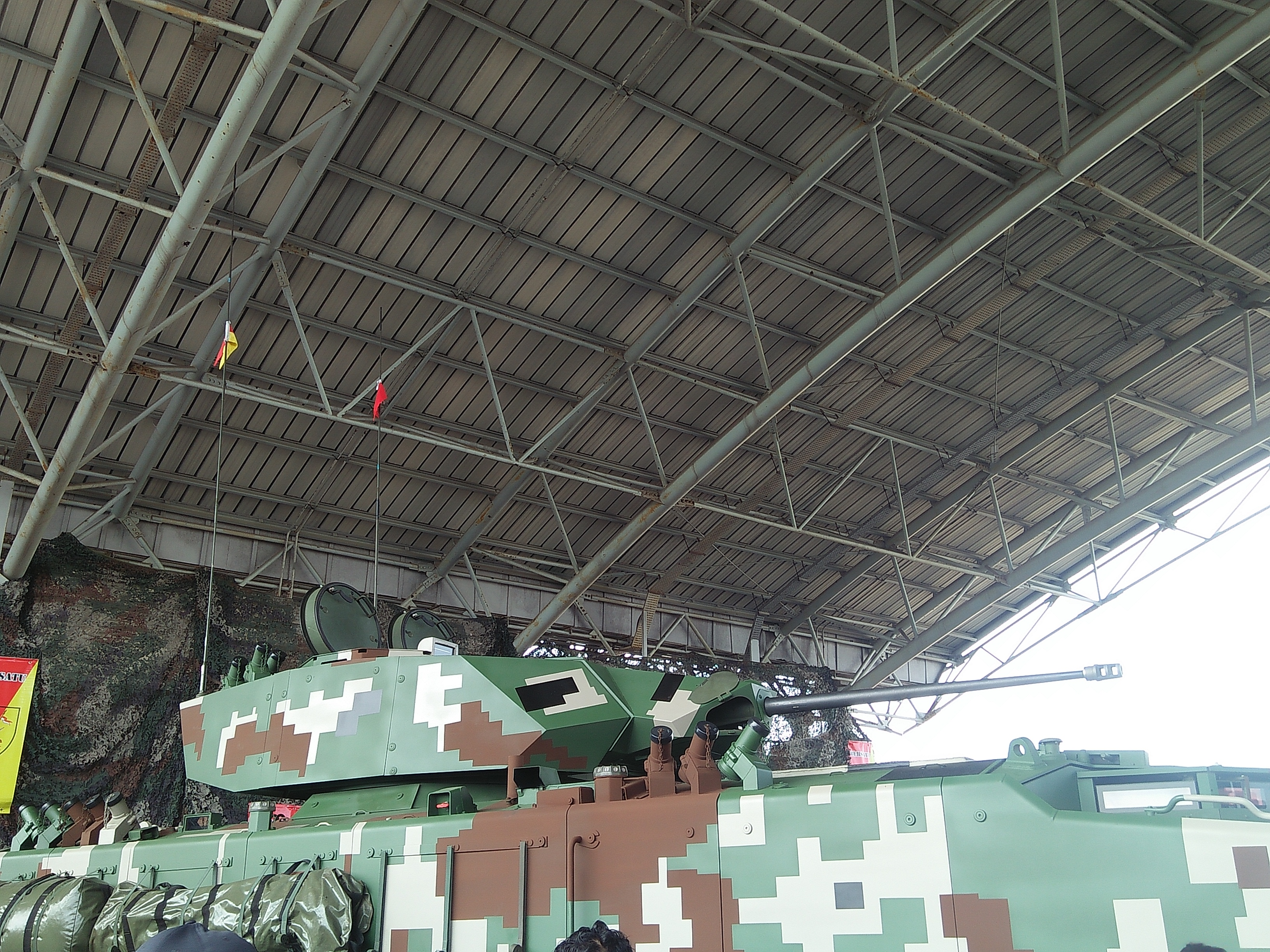
Denel LCT30 turret

The most numerous variant is the AFV30, equipped with an LCT30 turret. The LCT30 is a two-man turret designed and manufactured in South Africa by Denel Land Systems. The Denel LCT30 turret is armed with a Denel GI30 30 mm gun and a 7.62mm coaxial machine gun. The GI 30 is fully stabilized and has a computerized fire control system that enables targets to be engaged under day & night conditions with high first shot round hit probability even when the vehicle is moving. 78 units of this variant will be produced in the first batch of 257 AV8s.

=== IFV25 ===
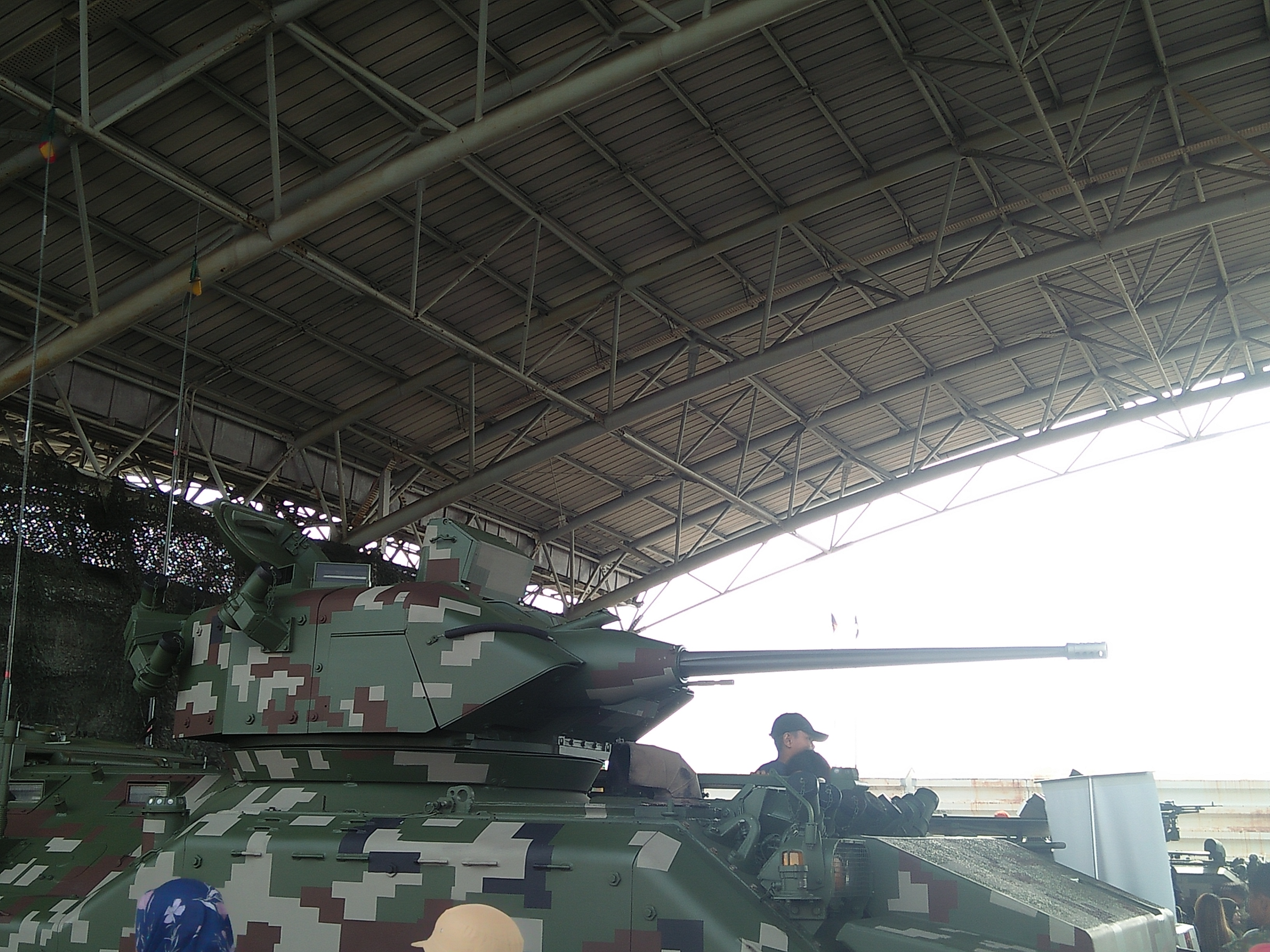
Sharpshooter 25mm turret

The IFV25 is the amphibious variant of the AV8, and is armed with a one-man Sharpshooter Turret. The FNSS Sharpshooter Turret is armed with a Bushmaster 25mm autocannon. A 7.62mm coaxial machine gun is mounted to the left side of the main armament. The turret is fully stabilised and can fire on the move in both day and night. The IFV25 variant has additional floats on the right side of the vehicle to balance the vehicle during amphibious operations. 46 units of this variant will be produced in the first batch of 257 AV8s.

=== 12.7mm RWS ===
The 12.7mm RWS variant is the most lightly armed AFV variant of the AV8 and is equipped with a Reutech Rogue 12.7mm remote weapon station. 54 units of this variant will be produced in the first batch of 257 AV8s.

=== LCT30 ATGM ===
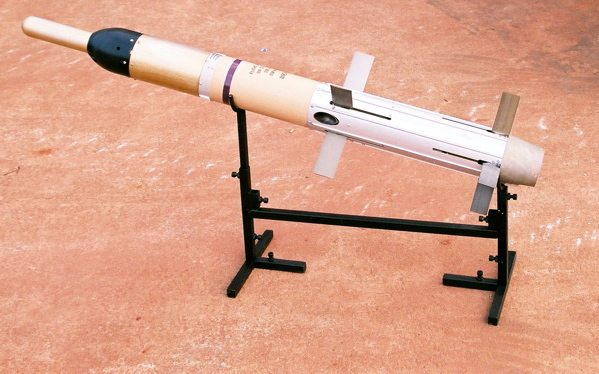
ZT3 Ingwe ATGM

The LCT30 ATGW variant is the most well-armed variant of the AV8, and is equipped with the LCT30 ATGW turret from Denel Land Systems. The LCT30 ATGW turret is armed with a Denel GI30 30 mm gun and one 7.62mm coaxial machine gun as well as four ZT3 Ingwe 127mm anti-tank guided missiles. The Ingwe is a laser beam riding missile with a range of 5000m and the ability to engage moving targets. 54 units of this variant will be produced in the first batch of 257 AV8s.

It's expected to be in service by 2020.

=== SPM 120 ===
The SPM 120 variant is the highest calibre variant of the AV8, and is equipped with a 2R2M self-loading 120 mm mortar. Eight units of this variant will be produced in the first batch of 257 AV8s. The variant can carry up to fifty 120 mm mortar rounds and can shoot these unguided mortar shells with support of GPS within 13 meters in width and 9 meters in length of the target.

=== Non-combat variants ===
The following are made by DefTech as for non-combat operations.

- Armoured surveillance vehicle with Rheinmetall Vingtaqs II battlefield radar and Thales Squire sensors (24)
- Command vehicles (13)
- Armoured ambulances (9)
- Armoured recovery vehicles (9)
- Maintenance vehicles (9)
- Engineering and NBC reconnaissance vehicles (4)
- Signals intelligence vehicles (3)

== Operators ==
=== Current operators ===
- Malaysia: 257 units. The first 12 AV8s were in service with the Malaysian Army on January 27, 2015.

=== Potential operators ===
- Saudi Arabia: At least one of AV8 Gempita, which is the variant of AFV30 in desert colour has been sent to Saudi Arabia for the trial in August or September 2018.

== Gallery ==
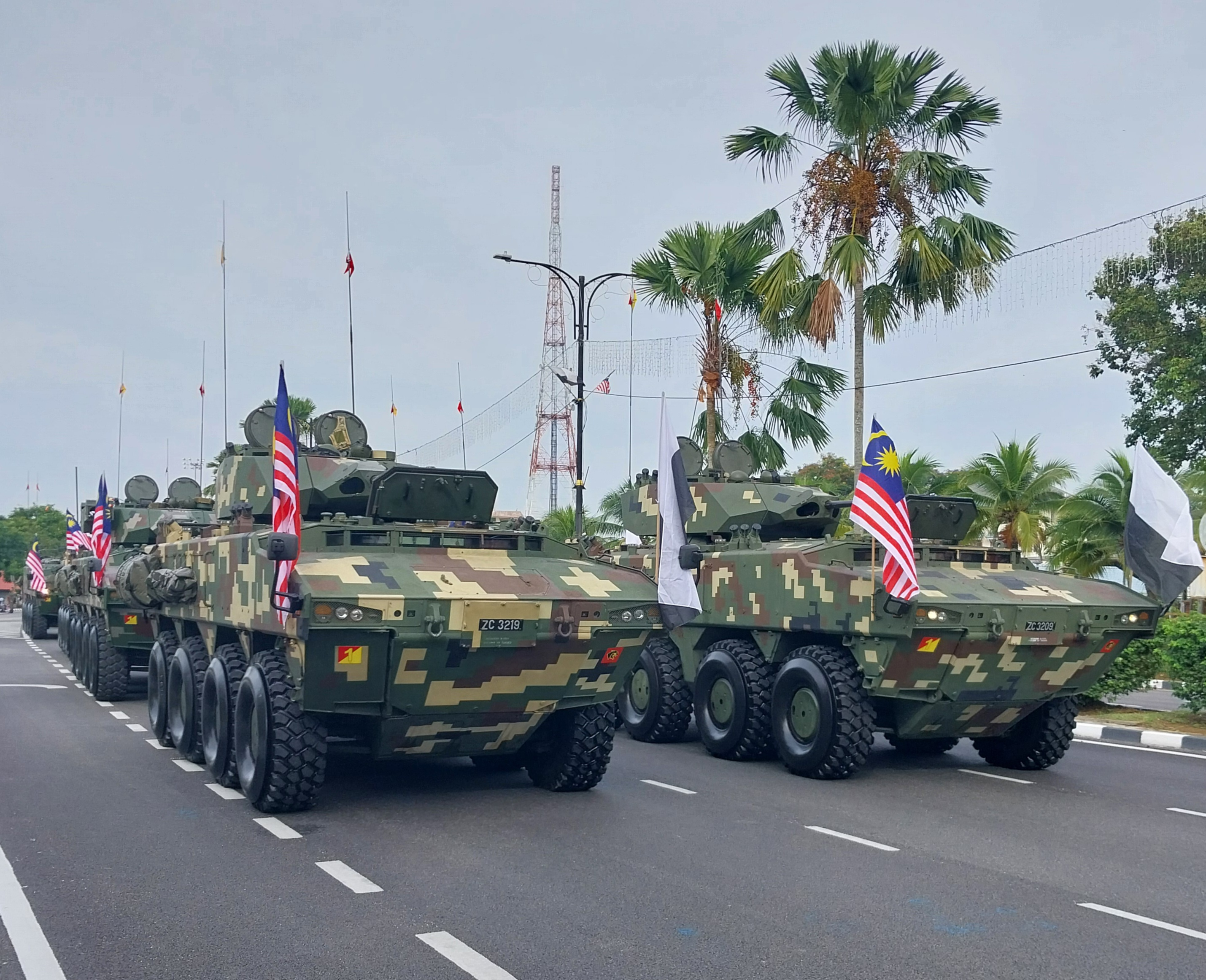
AV8 Gempita ready for 2025 parade.

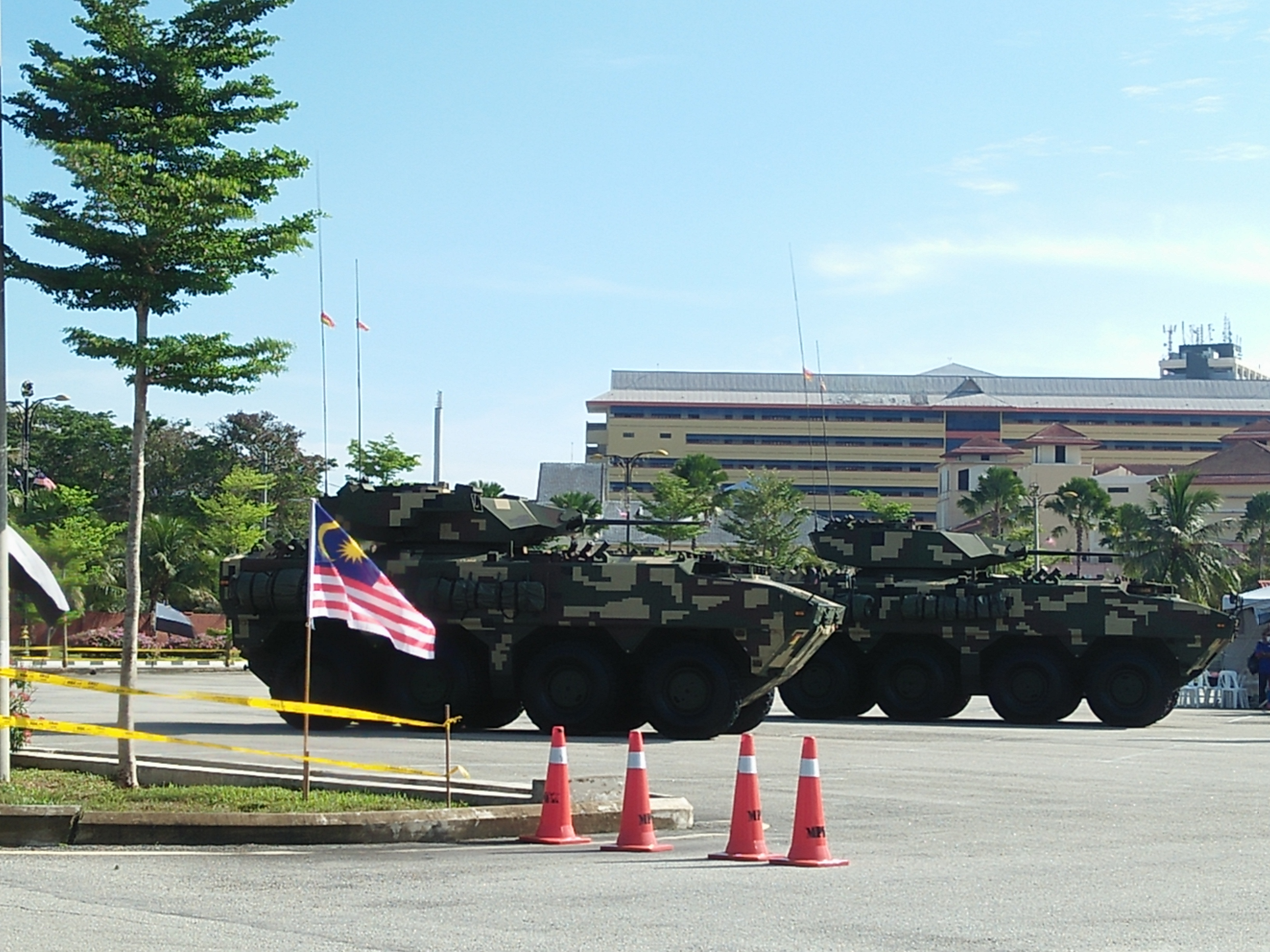
AV8 Gempita on display during NDP 2021 in Kuantan.

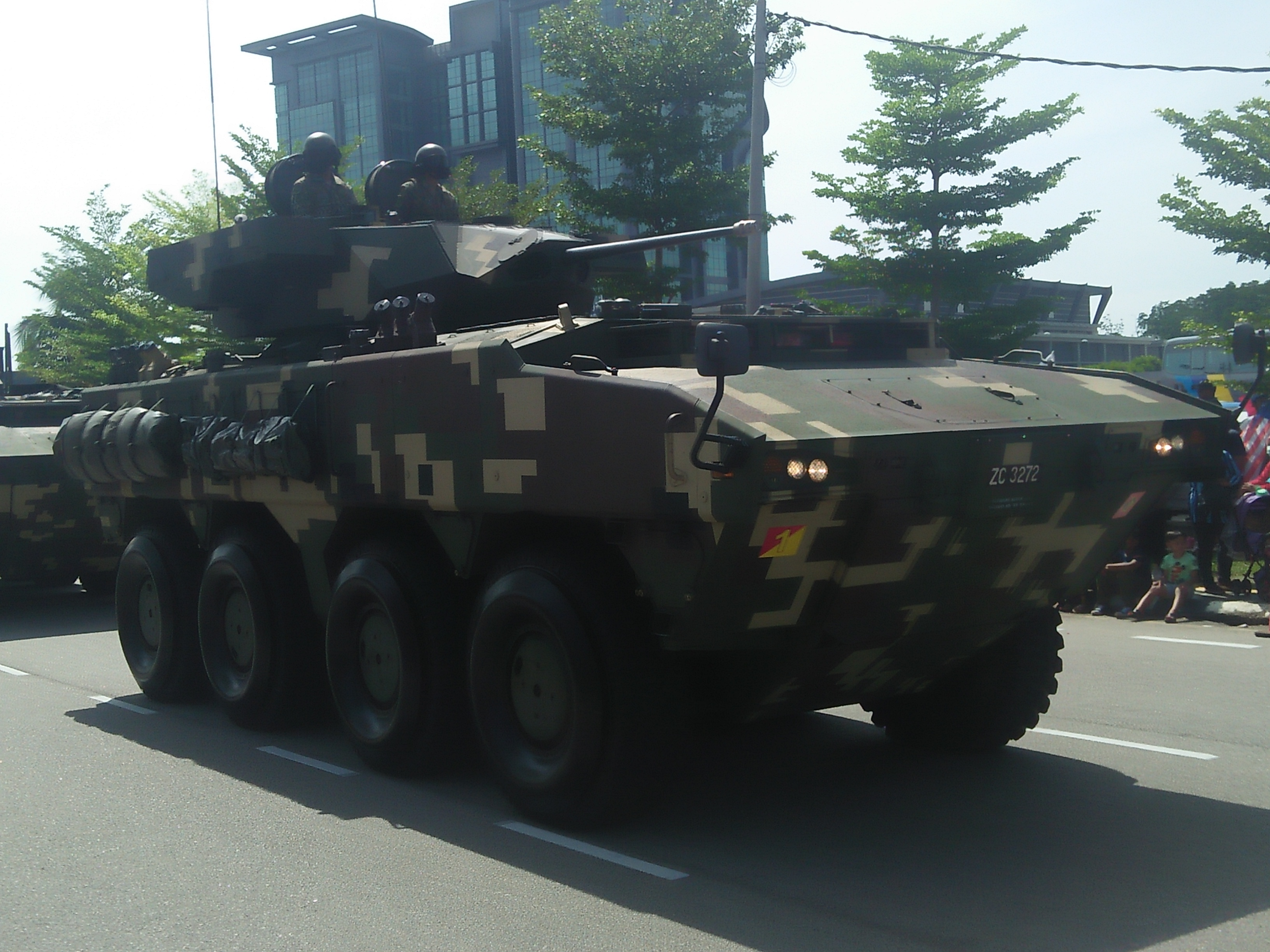
AV8 Gempita during NDP 2022 in Kuantan.

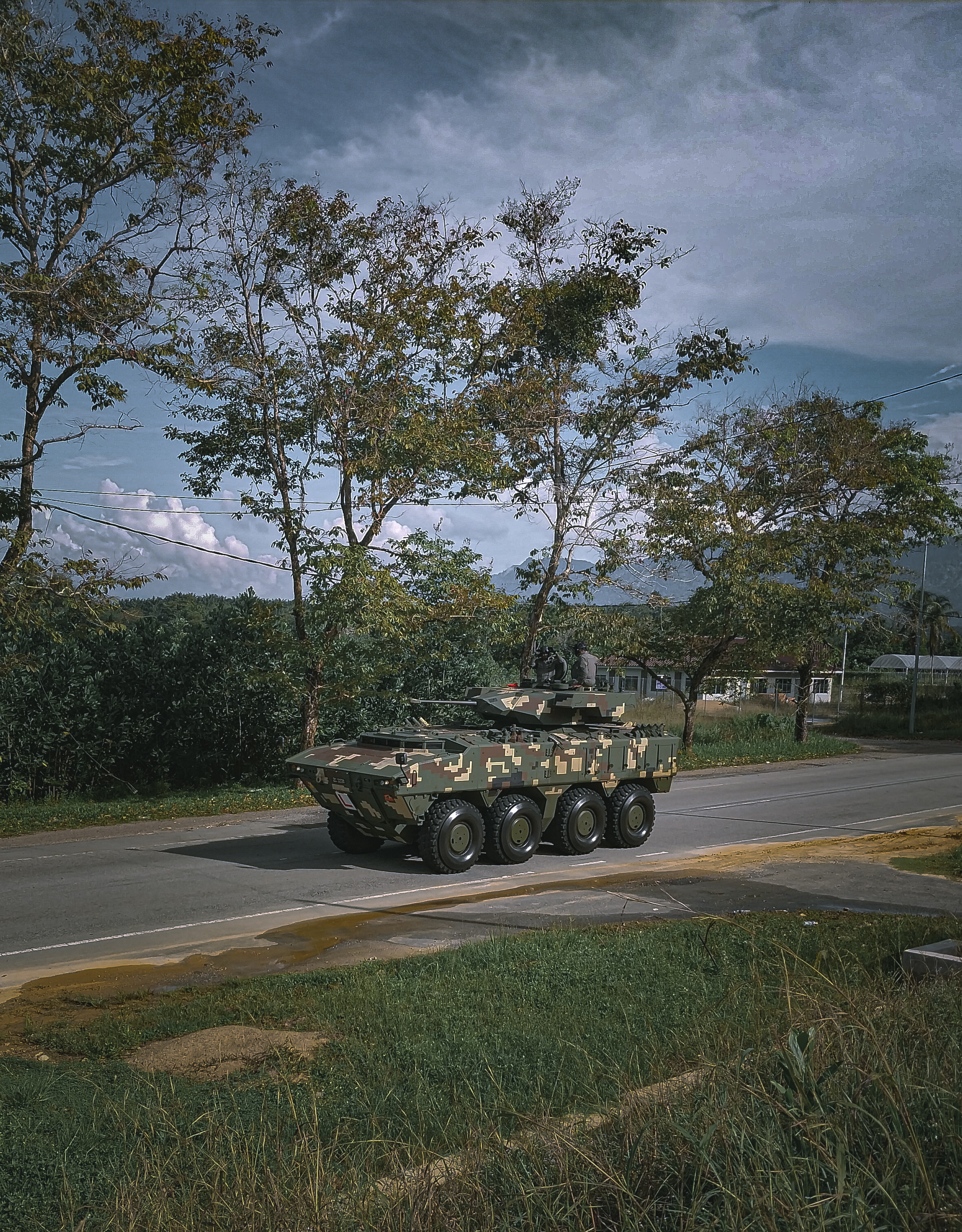
AV8 Gempita in training session.

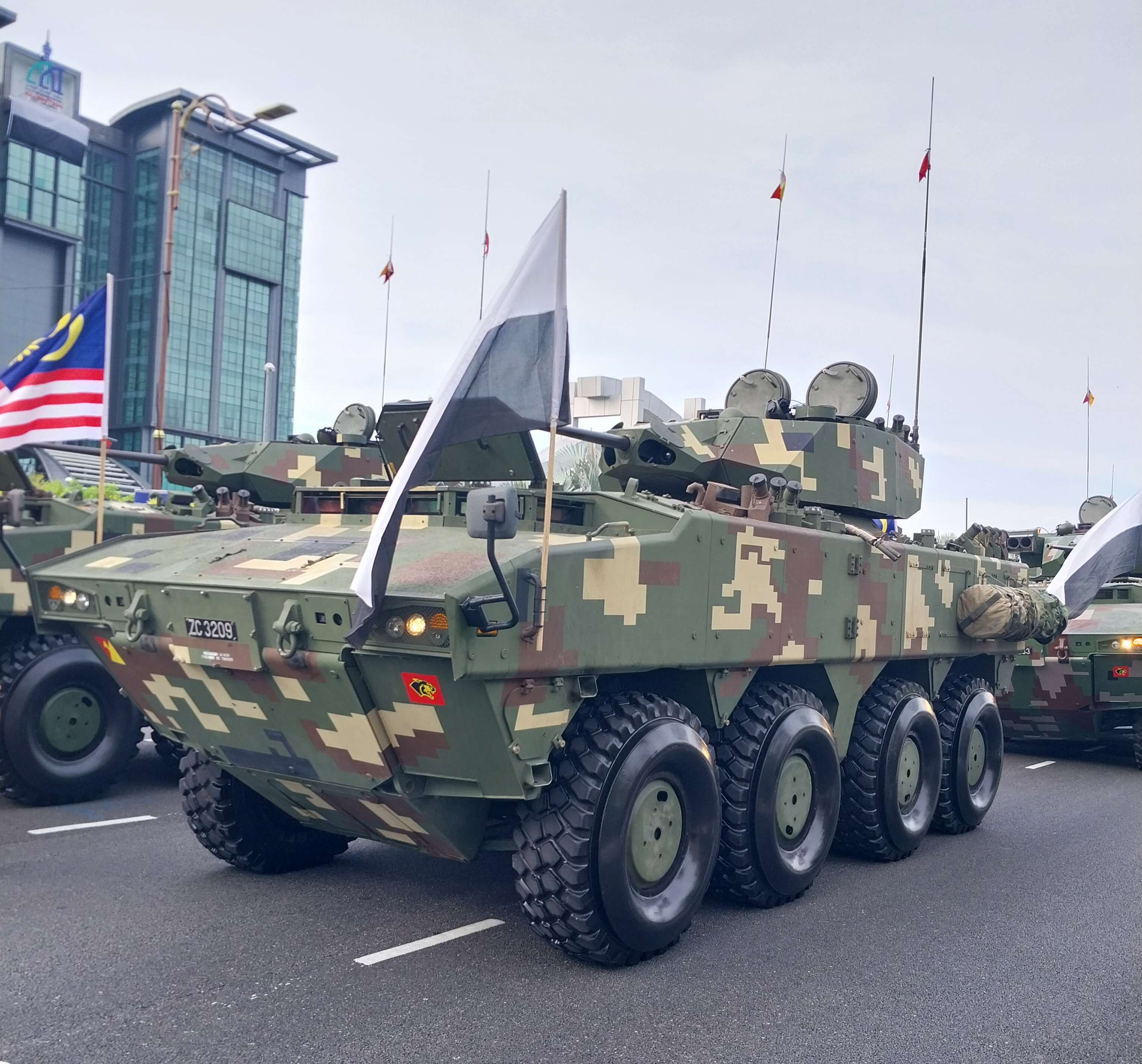
AV8 Gempita equipped with LCT30 turret.

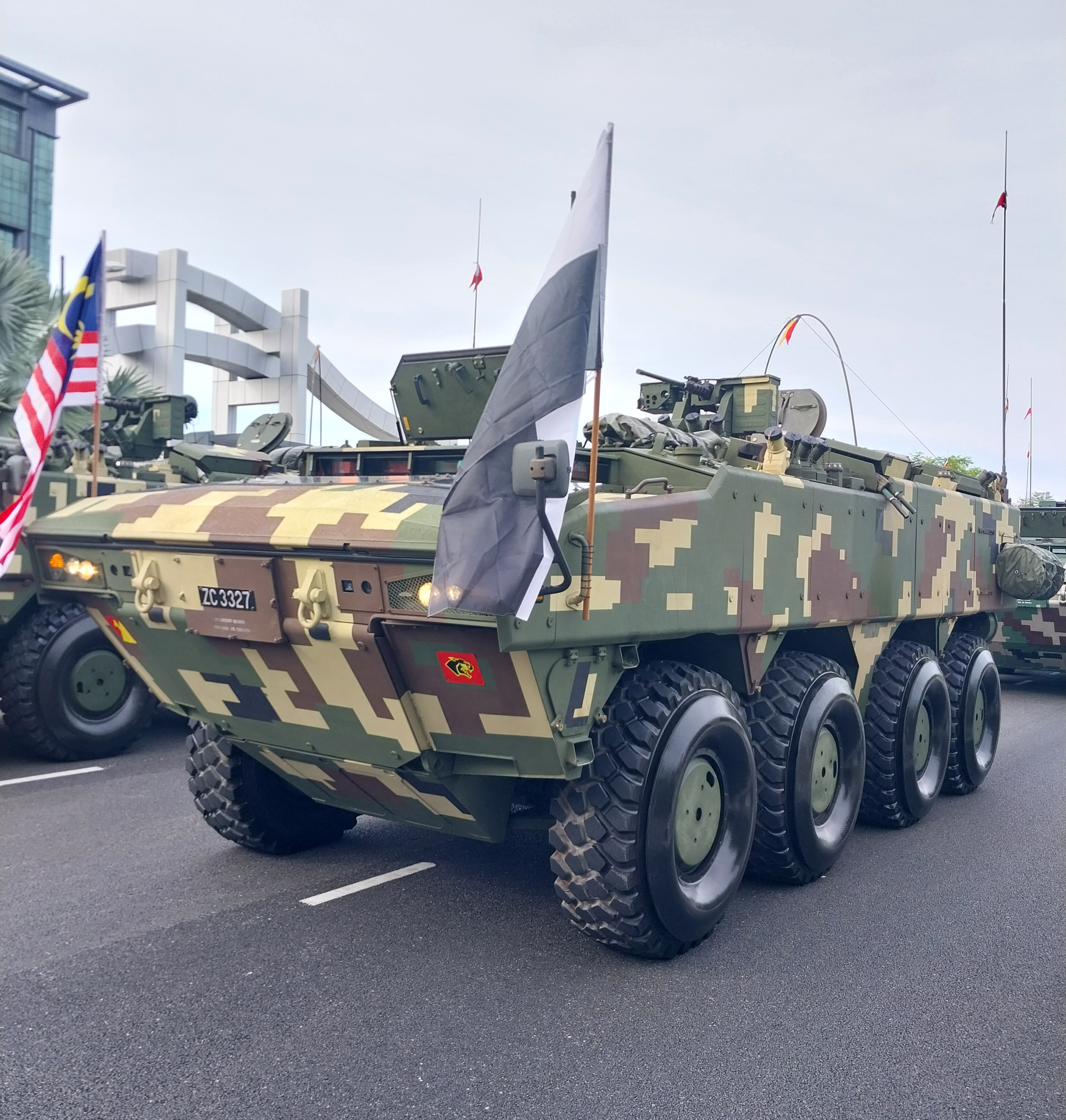
AV8 Gempita equipped with 12.7mm RCWS.

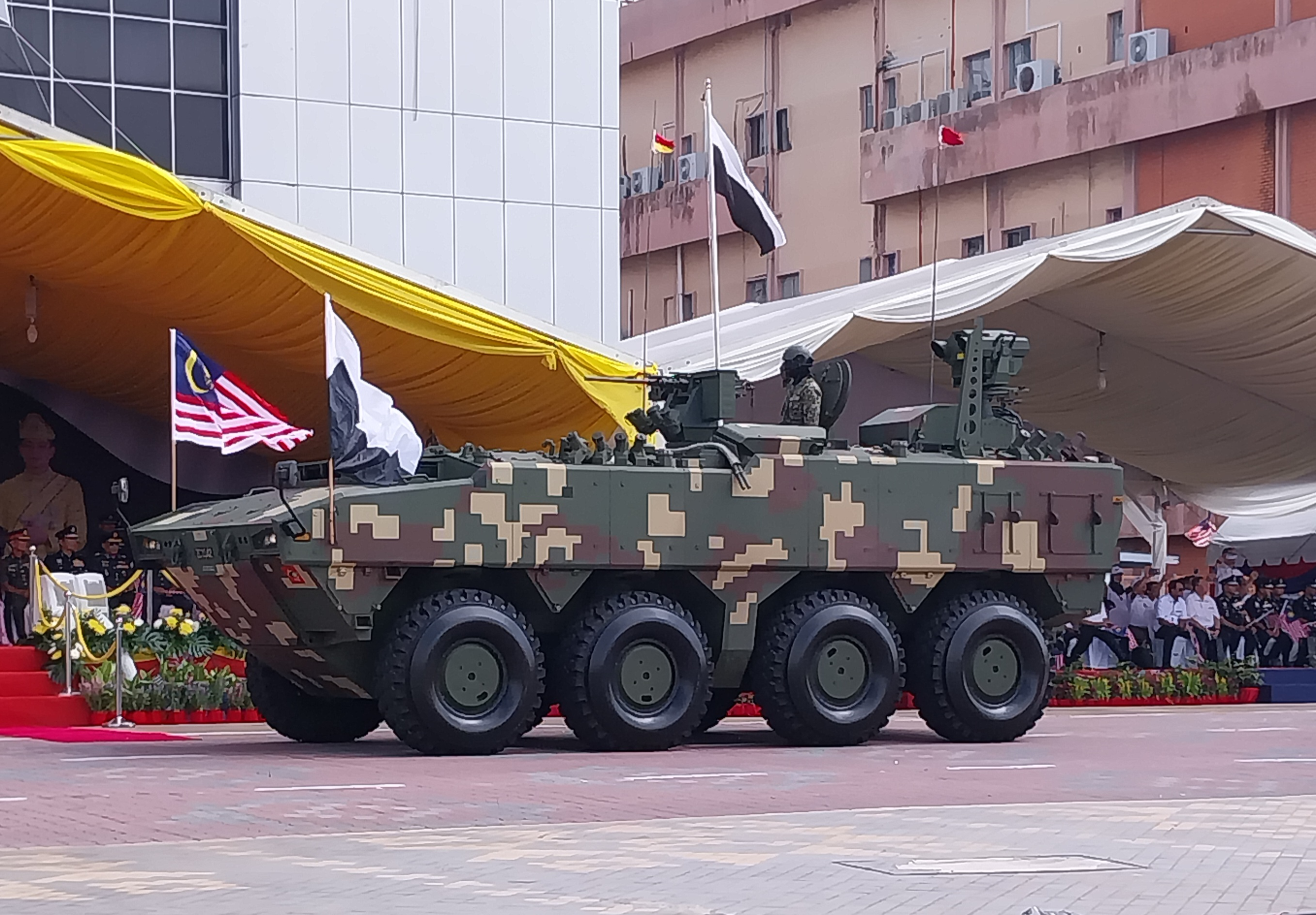
AV8 Gempita SURV variant with Vingtaqs surveillance system taking part in Kuantan NDP 2023.

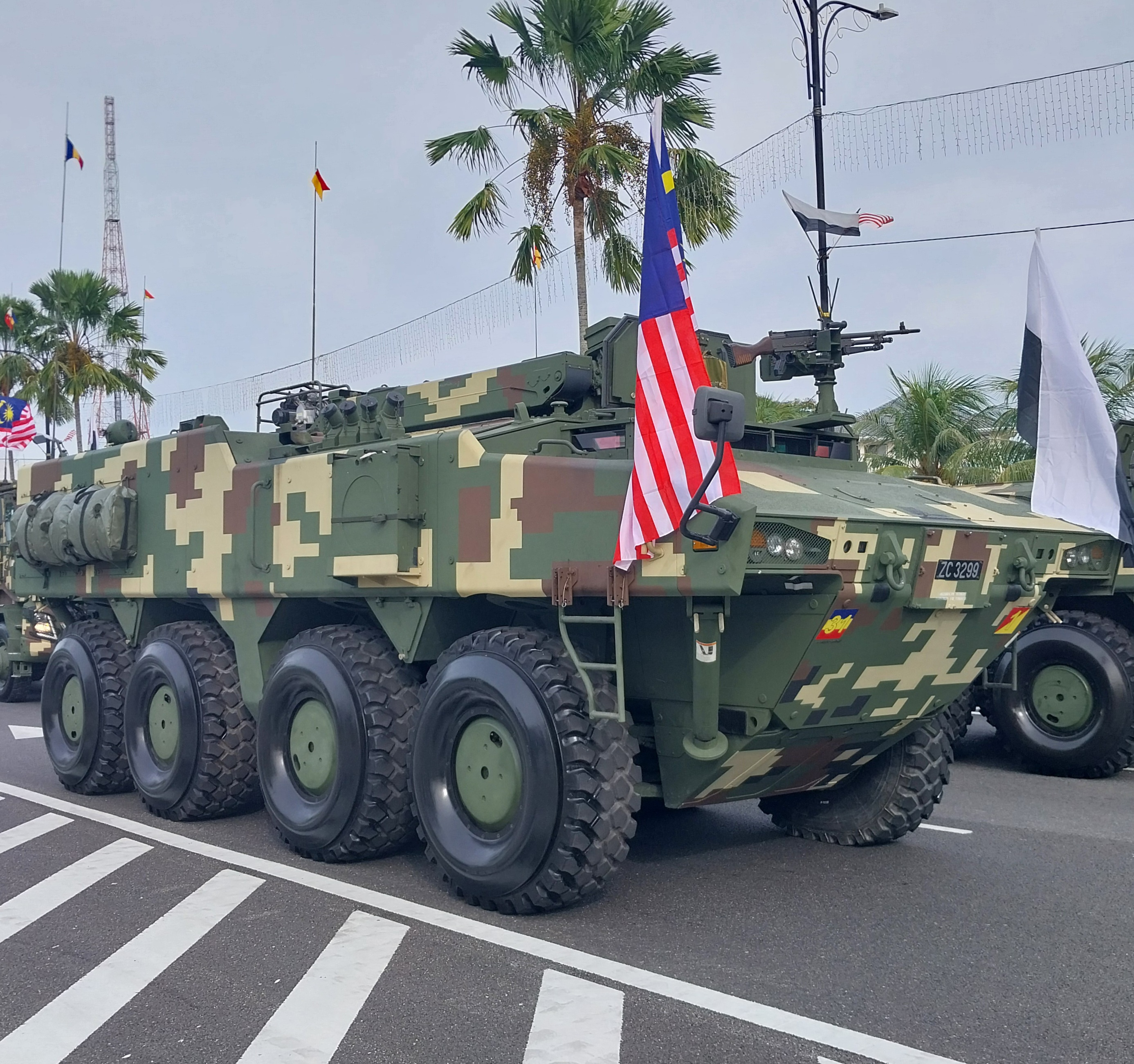
AV8 Gempita recovery vehicle variant.

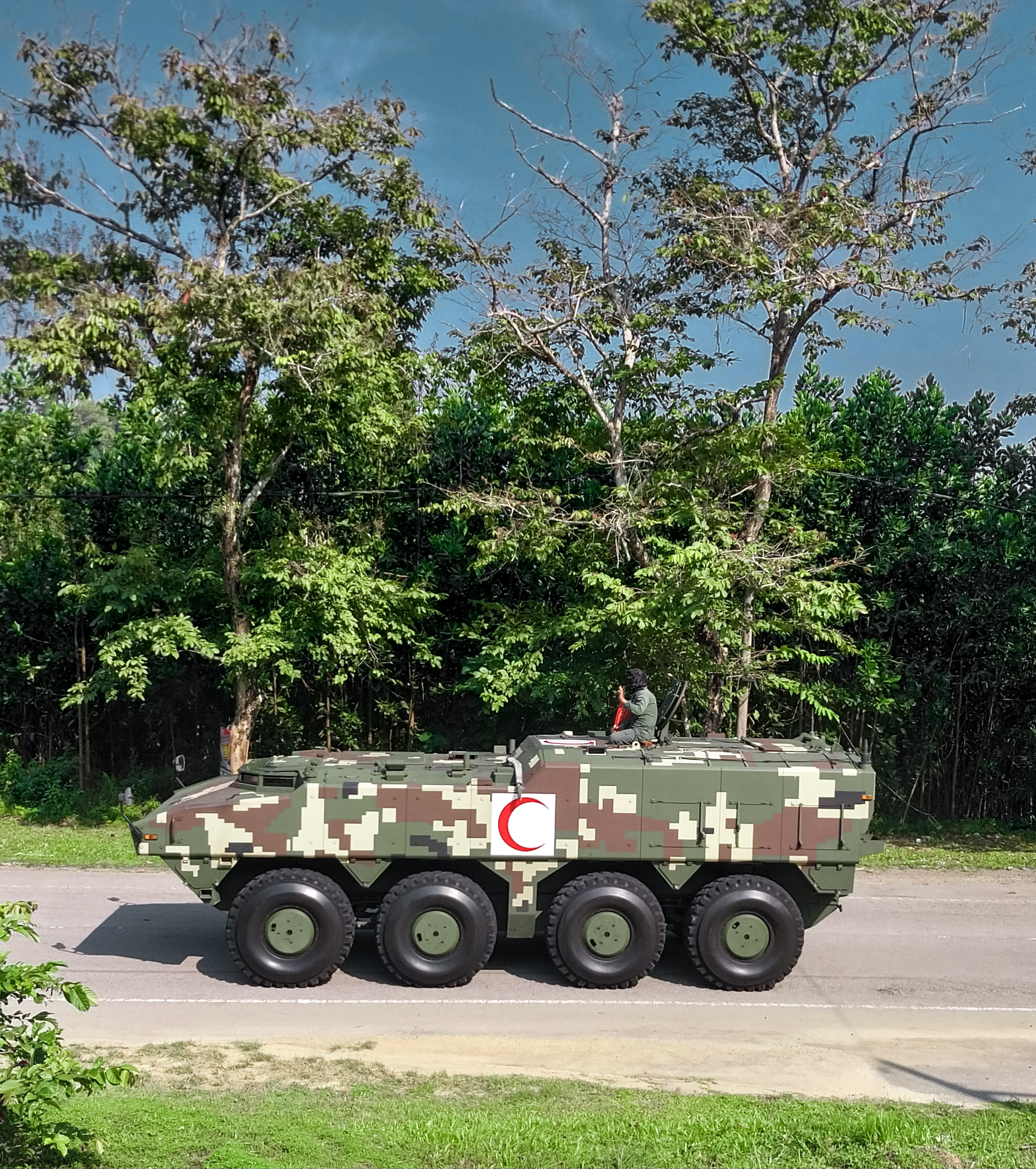
AV8 Gempita armoured ambulance variant.

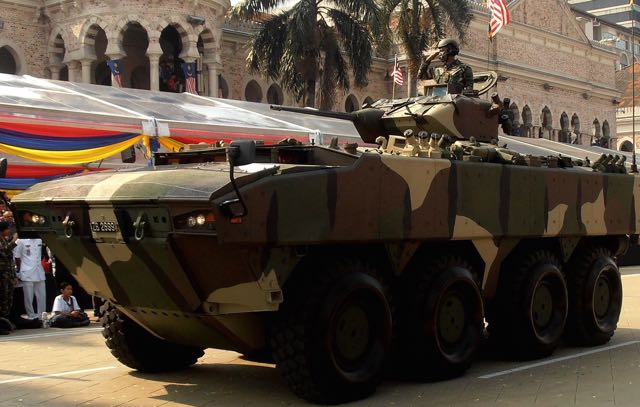
AV8 Gempita on the way in 56th NDP.

== See also ==
- DefTech ACV-300 Adnan
