= LAWC-T =

- Type: Armored combat vehicle
- Place of origin: Turkey

Production history
- Manufacturer: FNSS Defence Systems

Specifications
- Mass: 9 tonnes
- Crew: Maximum 5
- Engine: Min. 25 Hp/t Diesel Engin
- Suspension: torsion bar 350 mm
- Operational range: 600 km (370 mi)
- Maximum speed: 70 km/h (43 mph)

The LAWC-T (short for Light Armored Weapon Carrier) platform was developed by FNSS Defence Systems. to meet the requirements for a new agile armored combat vehicle that can be configured to meet many different mission requirements such as: anti-armor, fire support and reconnaissance roles. The vehicle can be fitted with a variety of turrets/weapon stations as well as Anti Armor (ATGM) turrets mounting a variety of missiles. The vehicle is capable of missions such as Reconnaissance and Surveillance. It can be integrated with elevated platforms fitted with Thermal Imagers, Long Range CCD cameras and Laser Rangefinders.

== Layout ==
The power pack is located at the rear of the platform enabling the driver and commander to sit side by side in the front providing a very high level of local situation awareness and high field of view with the help of eight frontal periscopes. The rear power pack configuration also enables a low thermal and noise signature.

== Crew accommodation ==
LAWC-T in the anti-armor role has a maximum crew of five. The crew enters and leaves via a clam-shell type door at the rear, two side doors and through the wide commander and driver hatches at the front.

== Powertrain ==
The vehicle has a 4-stroke diesel engine satisfying a minimum power-to-weight ratio of 25 hp/ton. Suspension is of the torsion bar type with either side having five dual road wheels, drive sprocket at the front, and idler at the rear and three shock absorbers on each side. The vehicle can be equipped with either conventional T130 or T150 tracks or rubber band tracks. Steering is of the hydro-static type.

== Armor ==
LAWC-T has a ballistic protection of NATO STANAG 4569 Level 4, providing immunity against 14.5mm heavy machine gun ammunition. The well-sloped glacis plate and the vertical hull sides allow additional armor to be fitted if required. The Standard mine protection meets STANAG 4569 Level 3a.

== Cameras ==
The vehicle is configured with all-around thermal/day cameras for driving and providing situational awareness to commander and driver. A modern open architecture system enables different electronic subsystems integration and allows future upgrades to be applied.

== Performance ==
LAWC-T platform has a high degree of mobility allowing the vehicle to keep pace with latest main battle tanks both on-road and cross country conditions.

== Deployability ==
The vehicle is deployable by C-130 aircraft as well as railway and sea transport vessels.
