= ZAHA Marine Assault Vehicle =

Turkish armoured amphibious combat vehicle

FNSS ZAHA MAV
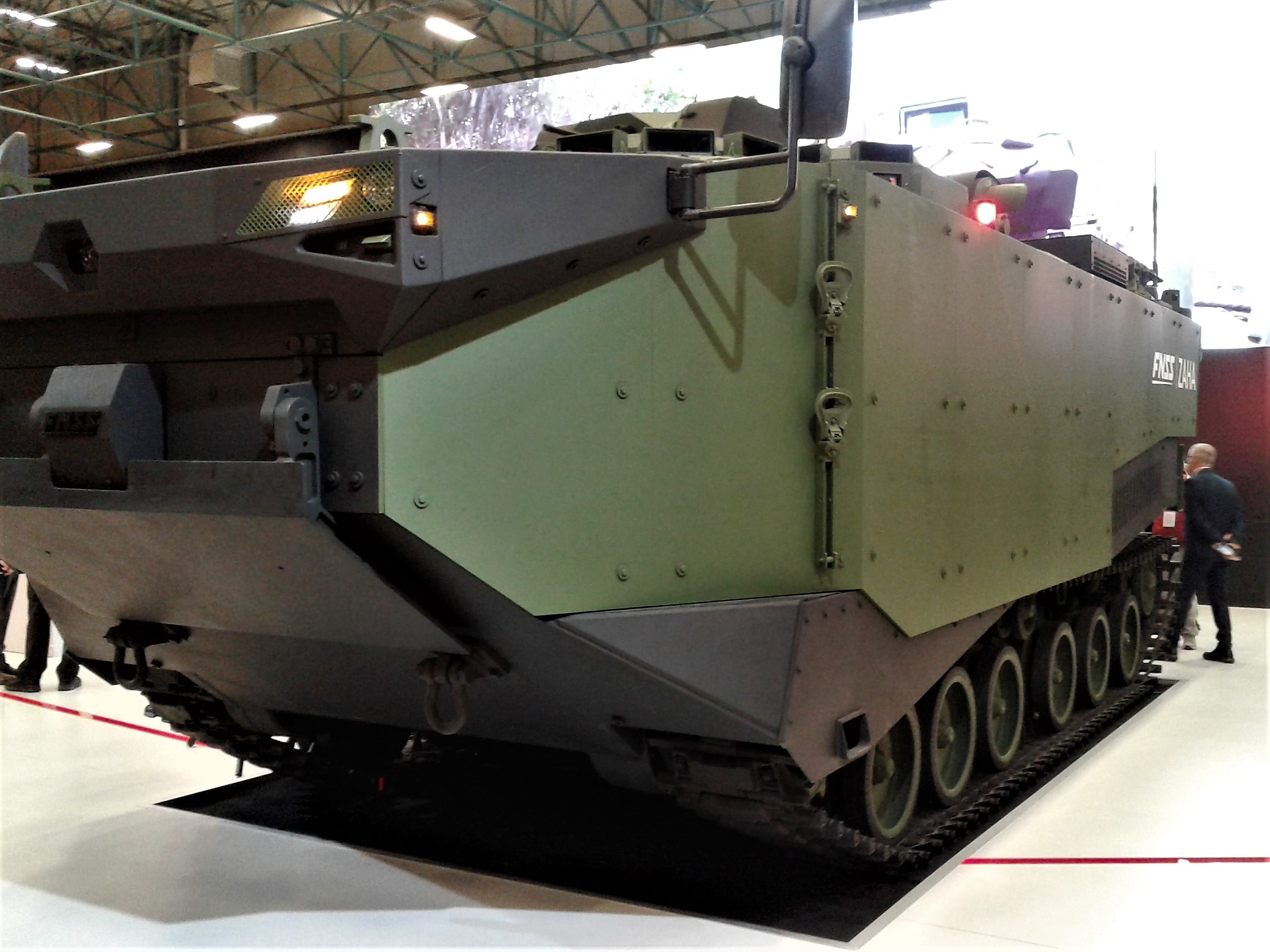
- FNSS ZAHA MAV at IDEF 2019
- Type: Amphibious combat vehicle
- Place of origin: Turkey

Service history
- In service: 2023 – Present
- Used by: See Operators

Production history
- Designer: FNSS Defence Systems
- Manufacturer: FNSS Defence Systems
- Produced: 2023 – present

Specifications
- Length: 8.3 m
- Width: 3.3 m
- Height: 3.8
- Crew: 21 (Incl. Gunner, Driver and Commander)
- Armor: Ballistic Protection STANAG 4569 (Level Classified)
- Main armament: Dual armament with 40 mm AGL and 12.7mm M2 Heavy MG
- Engine: Diesel
- Transmission: Fully Automatic
- Suspension: Torsion Bar
- Maximum speed: 70 km/h
- Steering system: Through Transmission

The ZAHA Marine Assault Vehicle (MAV), is a tracked armoured amphibious combat vehicle manufactured by FNSS. The vehicle is in service with the Turkish Naval Forces.

The vehicle is marketed in Turkey under the name ZAHA, an acronym derived from the Turkish phrase for Armored Amphibious Assault Vehicle. For international buyers, it is named as the FNSS MAV, which stands for Marine Assault Vehicle.

The vehicle can both operate in land and water. The MAV can reach up to 7 knots of speed in the water, as well as 70km/h on land.

The MAV is fitted with a CAKA Remote Controlled Turret, which is also manufactured by FNSS. The turret is armed with 12.7 mm MG (.50 Cal) and a 40 mm AGL (Automatic Grenade Launcher).

== Variants ==
APC Armored Personnel Carrier
The APC variant of the ZAHA MAV is equipped with the CAKA weapon station, capable of mounting a 12.7 mm heavy machine gun or a 40 mm grenade launcher for increased combat versatility.
Command and Control Vehicle
This variant makes sure combat vehicles communication each other and coordination with TCG Anadolu.
Recovery vehicle
The recovery vehicle variant has a lifting winch instead of a weapon system.

== Operators ==
=== Current operators ===
- Turkey - 27 Marine Assault Vehicles are in service with the TCG Anadolu of the Turkish Navy.
