= FNSS Samur =

Samur
- Type: Armoured vehicle-launched bridge
- Place of origin: Turkey

Service history
- In service: 2011-present
- Used by: Turkish Army

Production history
- Manufacturer: FNSS Defence Systems, Turkey

Specifications
- Mass: 36 t (40 short tons)
- Length: 13.0 m (42 ft 8 in)
- Width: 3.5 m (11 ft 6 in)
- Height: 4.1 m (13 ft 5 in)
- Crew: 3
- Main armament: None
- Secondary armament: None
- Engine: 390 kW (523 hp)
- Transmission: 6 speeds forward, 1 reverse (fully automatic)
- Suspension: Double wishbone independent air suspension
- Ground clearance: 0–65 cm (0–26 in)
- Operational range: 600 km (370 mi)
- Maximum speed: Land: 50 km/h (31 mph); Water: 10 km/h (6.2 mph) by two pump-jets

Samur or SYHK (short for Seyyar Yüzücü Hücum Köprüsü) is a Turkish amphibious armoured vehicle-launched bridge. Samur is the Turkish word for sable.

The equipment was developed and produced for the Turkish Armed Forces (TSK) by the Turkish company FNSS Defence Systems. After six years of development work, four units were delivered on September 14, 2011, in Ankara. The SYHK will improve the capability of the Turkish Army during river crossing operations.

== Characteristics ==
=== Basic systems ===
- Central tire inflation system (CTIS)
- Traction control system (TC)
- Recovery crane
- CBRN and ballistic protected personnel cabin
- Standard and emergency anchoring systems
- Radio and intercom
- Controller area network bus CAN bus
- Integrated failure detection system
- Automatic bilge water pumping (manually if needed)

=== Vehicle specifications ===
- Power plant: 390 kW (523 hp) diesel engine
- Transmission: 6 speeds forward, 1 reverse (fully automatic)
- Number of axles: 4 (All-wheel drive)
- Suspension: Double wishbone independent air suspension
- Electric power system:
  - Battery: 2 x 12 V, 120 Ah (C20)
  - Alternator: 2 x 140 A brushless
- Brake system: Hydraulic brake and anti-lock braking system (ABS) (all wheels)
- Parking pawl: Integrated into transmission, spring mechanic and hydraulic controlled
- Tires: 16.00 R20 solid disc (Run-flat tire type)
- Max. speed:
  - Land: 50 km/h (31 mph)
  - Water: 10 km/h (6.2 mph) by two pump-jets
- Operational range: 600 km (370 mi)
- Max. grade: 50%
- Max. grade (side slope): 30%
- Max. steep obstacle height: .50 m (1.6 ft)
- Max. ditch width: 2 m (6 ft 7 in)
- Min. turning radius: 12 m (39 ft 4 in)
- Max. payload capacity:
  - Double transport unit: MLC 70 (tracked vehicles)
  - Triple transport unit: MLC 100 (wheeled vehicles)
  - Deployed bridge mode: MLC 70 and MLC 100

=== General information ===
- Crew: 3
- Weight: 36 t (40 short tons)
- Vehicle class: MLC 35
- Length: 13.0 m (42 ft 8 in)
- Width: 3.5 m (11 ft 6 in)
- Height: 4.1 m (13 ft 5 in)
- Ground clearance: 0–65 cm (0–26 in) (adjustable)
