= FNSS Kunduz =

Turkish tracked amphibious combat engineering armoured bulldozer

Kunduz
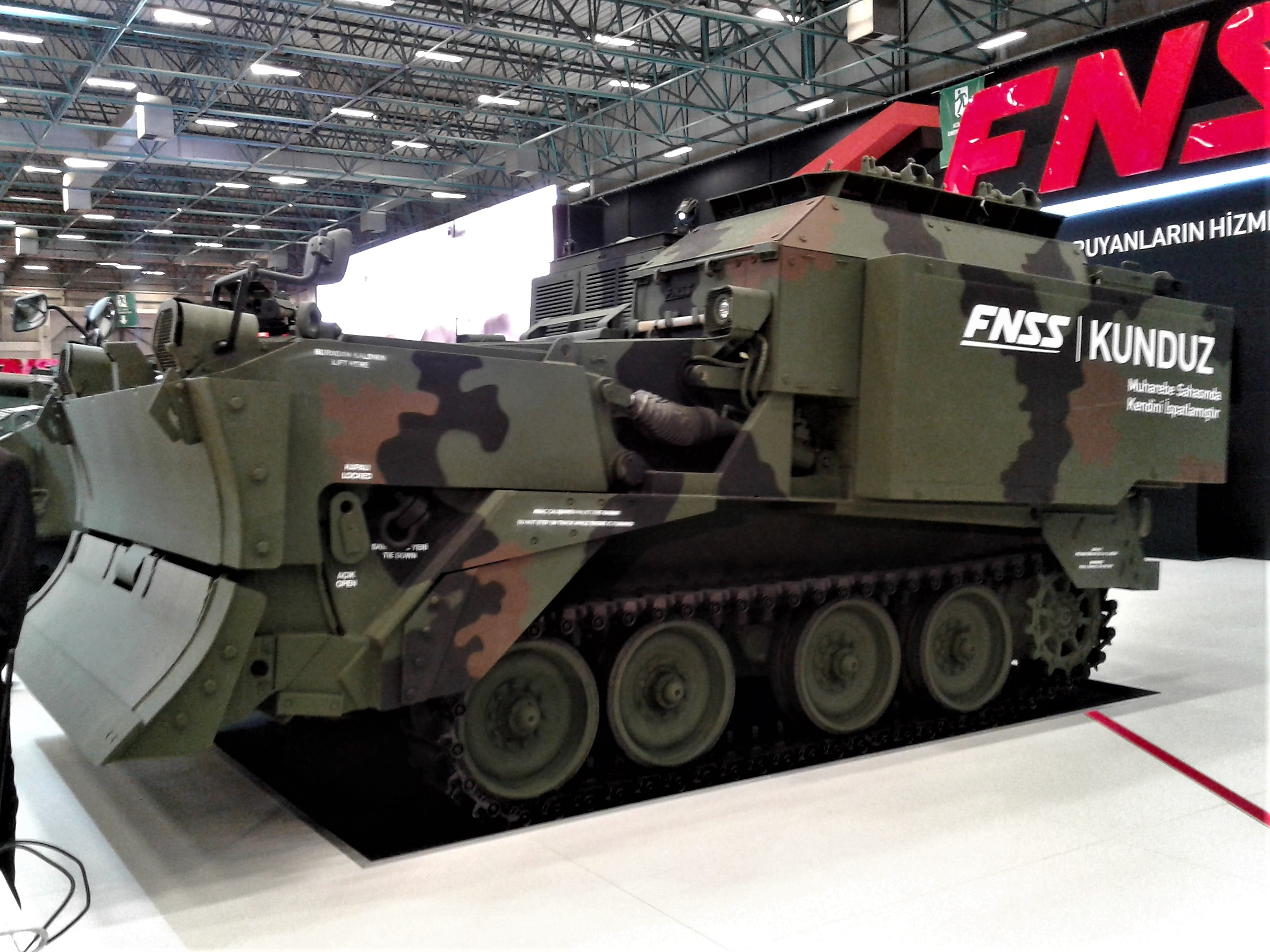
- FNSS Kundu at the IDEF 2019
- Type: Amphibious armoured bulldozer
- Manufacturer: FNSS Defence Systems, Turkey
- Production: 2013–present
- Propulsion: Tracks

Kunduz or AZMİM (short for Turkish: Amfibik Zırhlı Muharebe İstihkam İş Makinesi) is a Turkish tracked amphibious combat engineering armoured bulldozer.

== History ==
The Kunduz was developed and produced in less than four-years work for the Turkish Armed Forces (TSK) by the Turkish company FNSS Defence Systems. The prototype was delivered to the TSK on January 11, 2013 in Ankara. AZMİM will be operated to move earth, clear terrain obstacles, cut steep slopes and stabilize stream banks for easy river crossing of combat vehicles during Turkish Army's amphibious warfare.

The contract to develop the armoured amphibious bulldozer was signed on March 10, 2009 between the Ministry of National Defence and the FNSS. The project, which began to develop on June 15, 2009, foresees the production of twelve units until the end of 2013. The first was delivered on January 11, 2013.

== Specifications ==
AZMİM has two crew, one operator and one attendant. It is capable of shoveling, smoothing, hauling and excavating. Tests showed that it is resistant to land mines and armour-piercing shot and shell. AZMİM is equipped with daylight camera system, night vision device, multi-purpose LED display and air conditioner. The tracked vehicle can accompany other military combat vehicles without the need of a carrier thanks to its max. speed of 45 km/h (28 mph). Two installed pump-jets enable the amphibious bulldozer to conduct a 360 degrees turning movement in rip current waters.

== Operators ==
- Philippines
- Turkey
