= PARS ALPHA =

Turkish armoured fighting vehicle

FNSS Pars ALPHA
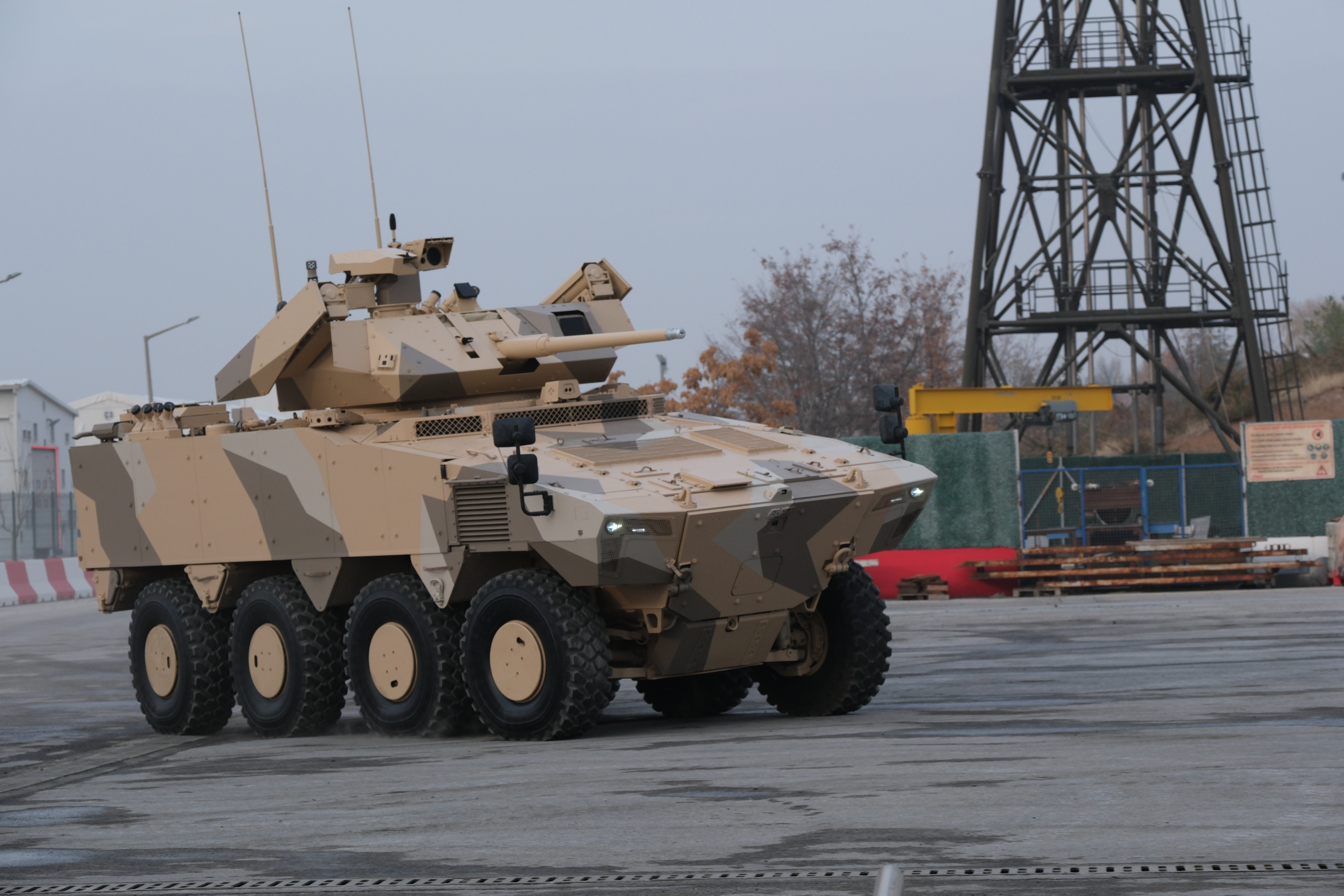
- FNSS Pars ALPHA 8×8
- Type: Armoured fighting vehicle
- Place of origin: Turkey

Production history
- Designer: FNSS Defence Systems
- Designed: 2020–present
- Manufacturer: FNSS Defence Systems

Specifications
- Length: 7.8 m
- Width: 3.1 m
- Height: 2.4 m (On Road); 2.2 m (On Transportation)
- Crew: 12 (3+9 Inc. Gunner, Driver & Commander, IFV Configuration with Remote Controlled Turret)
- Armor: STANAG 4569 (Level Classified)
- Main armament: TEBER-II 30/40 Remote Controlled Turret: 30mm/40mm Chain Gun, Dual Feed Automatic Cannon (can be replaced with a 30 or 40mm barrel, without making any changes to the gun mount and other parts)
- Secondary armament: 7.62 mm MG or 7.62 mm Bushmaster CG
- Engine: Diesel; 711 hp
- Power/weight: 21 hp/tonne
- Transmission: Fully Automatic, 6 speed forward, 1 speed reverse
- Suspension: Independent, Double Wishbone, Hydro-Pneumatic Suspension with Ride Height Control
- Operational range: 800 km
- Maximum speed: 115 km/h

The Pars ALPHA 8×8, is an infantry fighting vehicle (IFV) designed and manufactured by FNSS.

== Design ==
The vehicle is equipped with a diesel engine and can reach speeds up to 115 km/s, with an operational range of 800 km. It can carry up to a total of 12 personnel, including the driver, gunner and the commander.

=== Armament ===
The PARS ALPHA 8×8 AFV and its variants can be fitted with various types of manned or remote-control turrets with 35 mm, 90 mm, 105mm and 120 mm weapon systems, 120 mm mortars, air defence systems and anti-tank weapon systems.

The TEBER II 30/40 Remote Controlled Turret (RCT) is designed as the primary weapon system for the PARS ALPHA. The turret includes two anti-tank missiles ready for launch and utilizes an integrated fire control system, enabling target engagement at distances of up to four kilometers. The TEBER II is also equipped with a 30mm Mk44 Bushmaster II dual-feed automatic cannon, which can fire two different types of ammunition, allowing for quick switching between them. The cannon can be easily replaced with a 40mm barrel by changing the recoil spring and forward feeder.

As secondary armament, the turret includes a 7.62mm or 5.56mm caliber coaxial machine gun, which is mounted alongside the main cannon and used to target ground troops. Additionally, there are two anti-tank guided missiles (ATGM), which are designed to effectively target and destroy armored vehicles like tanks.

The vehicle has 16 smoke grenade dischargers to increase the protection of the crew operating it.

=== Mobility ===
PARS ALPHA 8×8 AFV can be transported with AN-124, C-5 Galaxy, C-17 Globemaster, IL-76 and A400M.

== Variants ==
The PARS ALPHA 8×8 is available in 9 different variants. These adapt the vehicle for various roles by modifying weapons, turrets, and systems. Changes include different calibers for direct fire, autocannons with manned or remote turrets, mortars for indirect fire, air defense guns or missiles, and specialized configurations for engineering or command operations, ensuring versatility for diverse missions.

- PARS ALPHA 8×8 120mm/105mm/90mm Mobile Gun System
- PARS ALPHA 8×8 30mm or 40mm New Gen AFV with Two Man Turret
- PARS ALPHA 8×8 30mm or 40mm New Gen AFV with Remote Controlled Turret
- PARS ALPHA 8×8 35mm New Gen AFV with Remote Controlled Turret
- PARS ALPHA 8×8 2×120mm Armoured Mortar Vehicle
- PARS ALPHA 8×8 2X35mm Air Defence Gun System
- PARS ALPHA 8×8 Air Defence Missile System
- PARS ALPHA 8×8 Combat Engineering Squad Vehicle
- PARS ALPHA 8×8 Command Control & Fire Support Vehicle

== See also ==
- Stryker
- BTR-90
- BTR-4
- Patria AMV
