= Nurol Teknoloji =

Turkish defence manufacturer

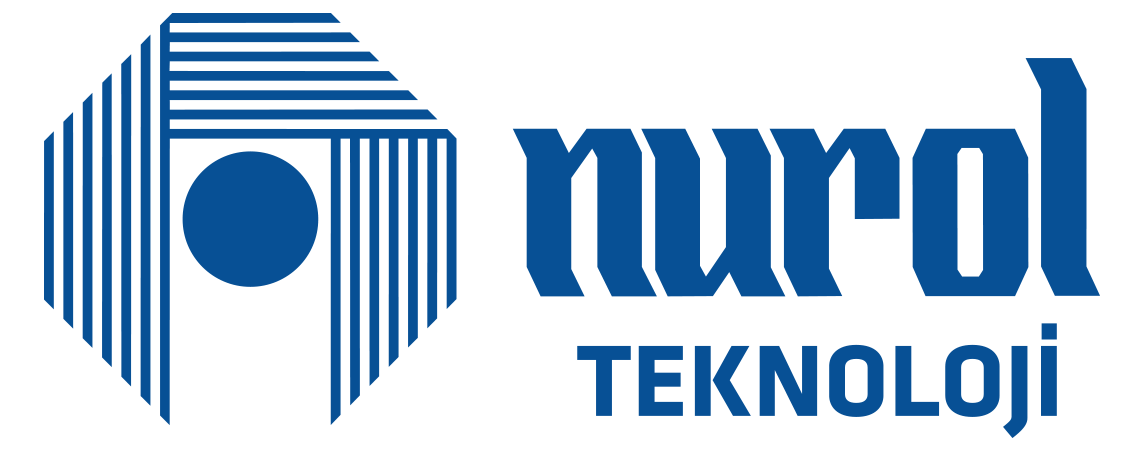
- Industry: Defence industry
- Founded: 2008
- Headquarters: Gölbaşı, Ankara, Turkey
- Key people: Serpil Gönenç Dinçer (General Manager)
- Products: Technical Ceramics, Ballistic Armor, Personnel Protection
- Number of employees: 430
- Parent: Nurol Holding
- Website: www.nurolteknoloji.com

Nurol Teknoloji is a Turkish defense industry company specializing in the manufacturing of advanced technical ceramics and ballistic protection solutions. Founded in 2008 in Ankara as a subsidiary of Nurol Holding, the company is known for its vertically integrated production capability, producing ceramic powder, sintered ceramics, and composite ballistic armor for personnel, vehicles, and structures.

Headquartered in Gölbaşı, Ankara, the company operates manufacturing facilities in Kahramankazan and maintains international subsidiaries in Germany and the United States.

== History ==
Nurol Teknoloji was established in 2008 to produce ballistic products using advanced ceramic technologies. By 2010, it was reported as one of the first Turkish companies to manufacture ceramic armor domestically. The company began mass production of boron carbide (B_{4}C) and silicon carbide (SiC) ceramics in 2012.

In 2021, the company expanded its capabilities by opening a new R&D Center and facilities designated as centers of excellence in Gölbaşı and Kahramankazan. To enter the Americas market, Nurol Technology USA LLC was established in 2022.

In 2023, Nurol Holding acquired a majority stake in the German ceramic manufacturer Industriekeramik Hochrhein GmbH (IKH). This acquisition allowed Nurol Teknoloji to secure its supply chain for ceramic powder metallurgy.

In 2024, five of the company’s products received certification from the U.S. National Institute of Justice (NIJ).

== Operations and products ==
Nurol Teknoloji operates as a vertically integrated manufacturer, managing processes from ceramic powder preparation to final ballistic assembly.

=== Advanced technical ceramics ===
The company produces technical ceramics including alumina (Al_{2}O_{3}), silicon carbide (SiC), and boron carbide (B_{4}C). These materials are used for ballistic armor applications as well as industrial wear-resistant parts and high-temperature applications.

Industry publications such as Army Technology and Defence Turkey have covered the company's developments in lighter weight ceramic solutions.

=== Personnel protection ===
The company manufactures personal protective equipment (PPE) compliant with international standards such as NIJ, STANAG, and VPAM. Products include:

- Soft Armor: Vests designed for mobility, providing NIJ Level II and IIIA protection.
- Hard Armor Plates: Ceramic plates (B_{4}C, SiC, Al_{2}O_{3}) capable of stopping high-velocity rifle ammunition (NIJ Level III/IV).
- Ballistic Helmets: Composite helmets offering fragmentation protection compliant with STANAG 2920.

=== Platform and structural armor ===
Nurol Teknoloji produces armor kits for land, air, and naval platforms.

- Land Vehicles: Add-on armor and spall liners tested to STANAG 4569 levels 1 through 6.
- Aerospace: Lightweight ceramic armor for helicopter seats and floors.
- Structural: Armored cabins and panels for critical infrastructure protection.

== Research and development ==
The company operates ballistic test laboratories accredited by the Turkish Accreditation Agency (TÜRKAK). These facilities are capable of conducting tests according to NIJ, STANAG, and TS EN standards. The company also utilizes simulation technologies, including finite element analysis and Split-Hopkinson pressure bar testing, for material characterization.

== Exports ==
As of 2024, Nurol Teknoloji exports to over 65 countries. The Anadolu Agency reported that the company supplies equipment to security forces in various NATO member states, including Italy, Poland, Germany, Belgium, and the Netherlands.

=== Russo-Ukrainian War ===
During the Russo-Ukrainian War, reports indicated that Nurol Teknoloji supplied ballistic plates and vests to Ukraine, which were utilized by security forces in active conflict zones.

=== United States ===
The company established a presence in the US market through its subsidiary Nurol Technology USA. Reports state that the company has secured export agreements for ballistic armor in the region.

== Subsidiaries ==
- Industriekeramik Hochrhein GmbH (IKH) – Germany
- Nurol Technology USA LLC – United States
- NT Armor – United States
- NT Cera – United States
