= FNSS Defence Systems =

Turkish defense manufacturer

- Type: Public limited company
- Industry: Defence
- Founded: 1988
- Headquarters: Gölbaşı, Ankara, Turkey
- Area served: Worldwide
- Products: Armored combat vehicles Weapon systems
- Services: Upgrade & Modernisation; Integrated logistics support services
- Revenue: ▲US$515,018,000 (2019); US$374,552,094 (2018)
- Number of employees: 782
- Website: Official website

FNSS Savunma Sistemleri A.Ş. (English: FNSS Defence Systems A.Ş.) is a Turkish defense manufacturer founded in 1988. As of January 2025 the company is fully owned by Nurol Holding of Türkiye and operates facilities located in Gölbaşı, Ankara.

FNSS was founded as a joint venture between FMC Corporation and Nurol Holding as FMC Nurol Savunma Sanayii A.Ş. It is a major supplier of tracked and wheeled armored vehicles and weapon systems for the Turkish Armed Forces and Allied Armed Forces.

In May 2026, FNSS Defence Systems and the Czechoslovak Group (CSG) announced a strategic cooperation agreement for the joint development and production of armoured vehicle platforms for European and international markets, with the CFL-120 Karpat combat vehicle unveiled at the IDEB 2026 defence exhibition in Bratislava as the first product of the partnership. The vehicle is based on the FNSS Kaplan MT chassis and is equipped with Leonardo’s HITFACT Mk II turret armed with a 120 mm gun, and the companies have stated that the cooperation may expand to additional tracked armoured systems in future phases.

== Products ==
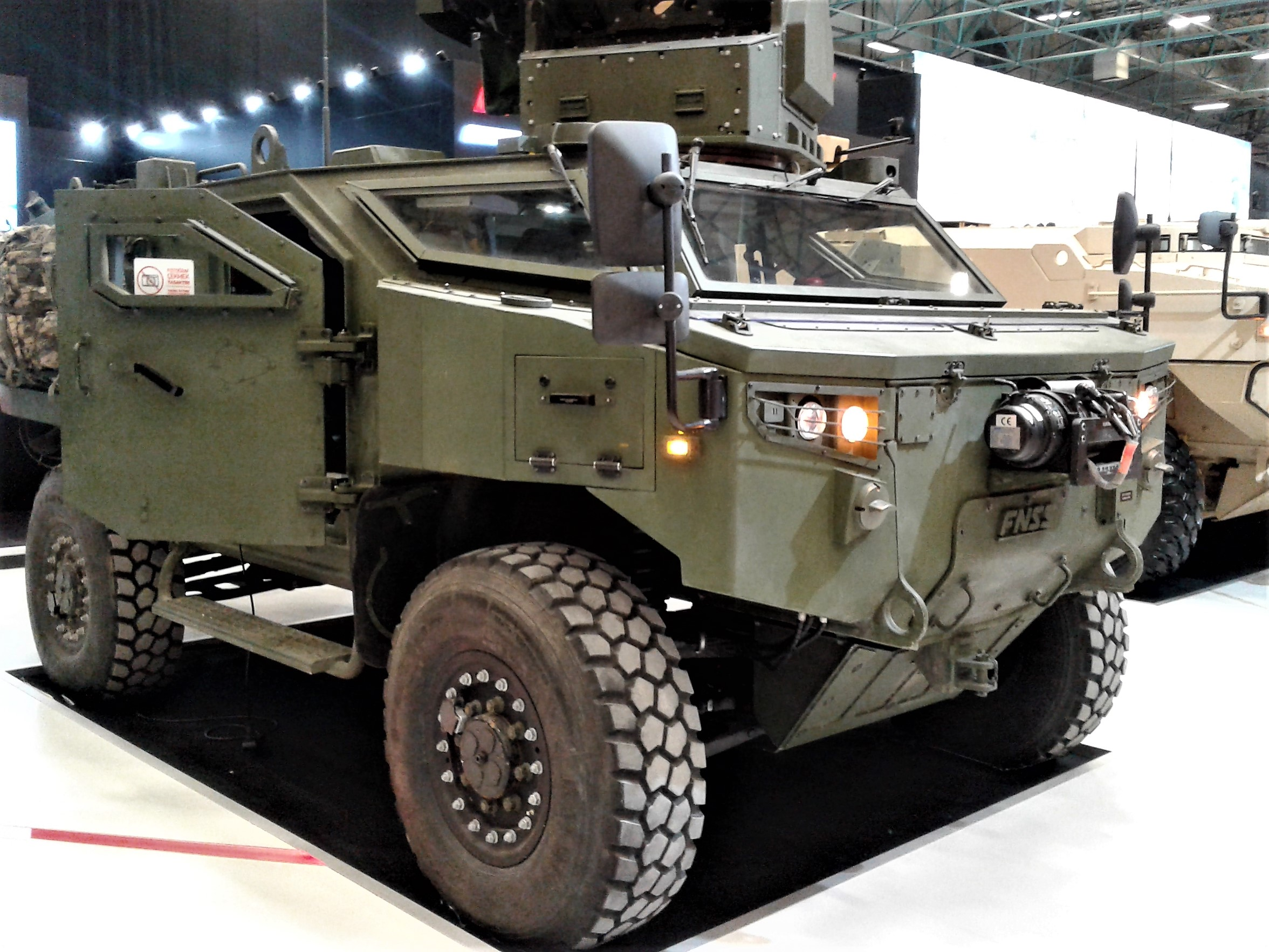
FNSS Pars 4x4 Anti-tank at the IDEF 2019.

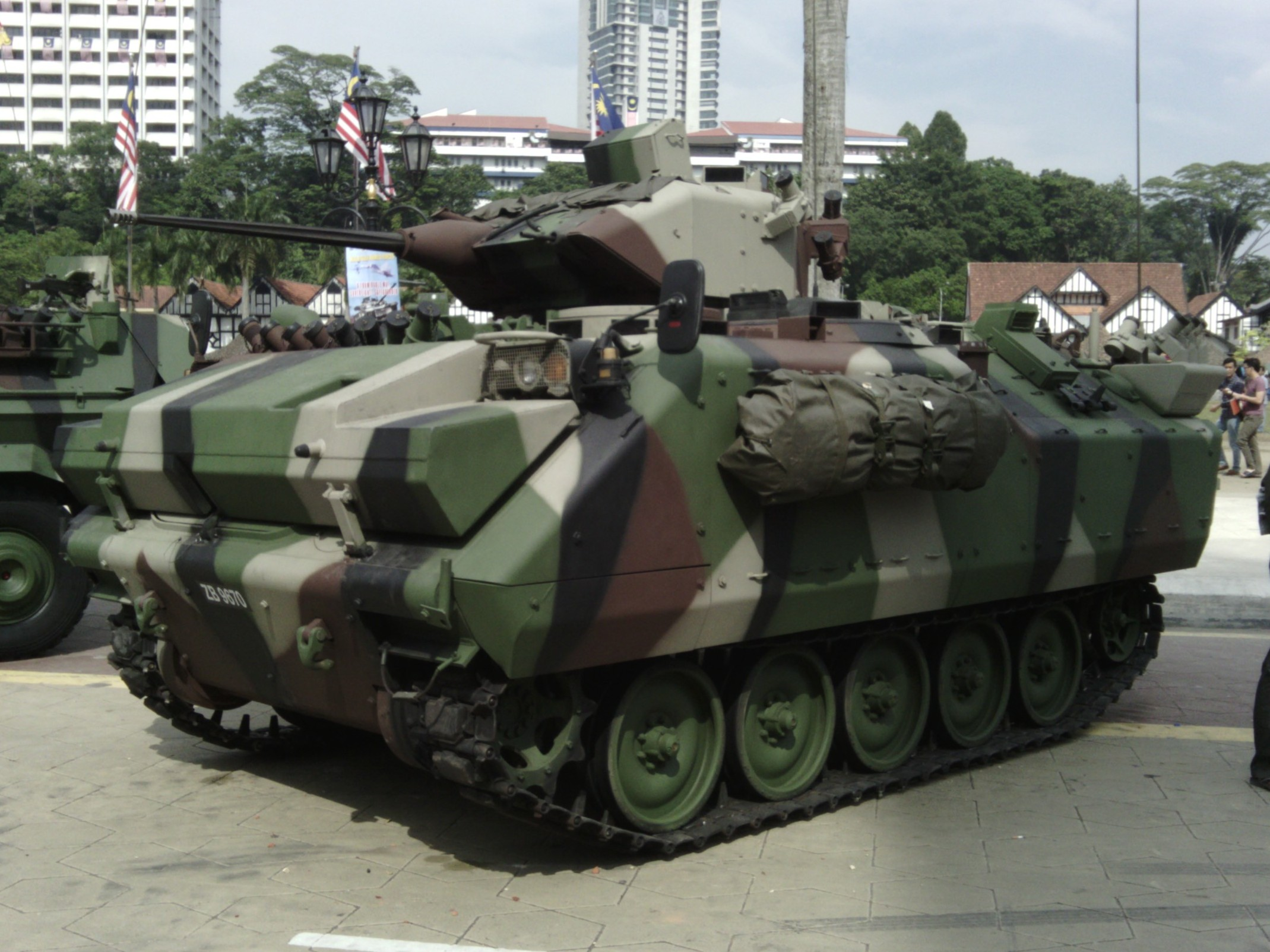
FNSS ACV-15 Adnan of Malaysian Army

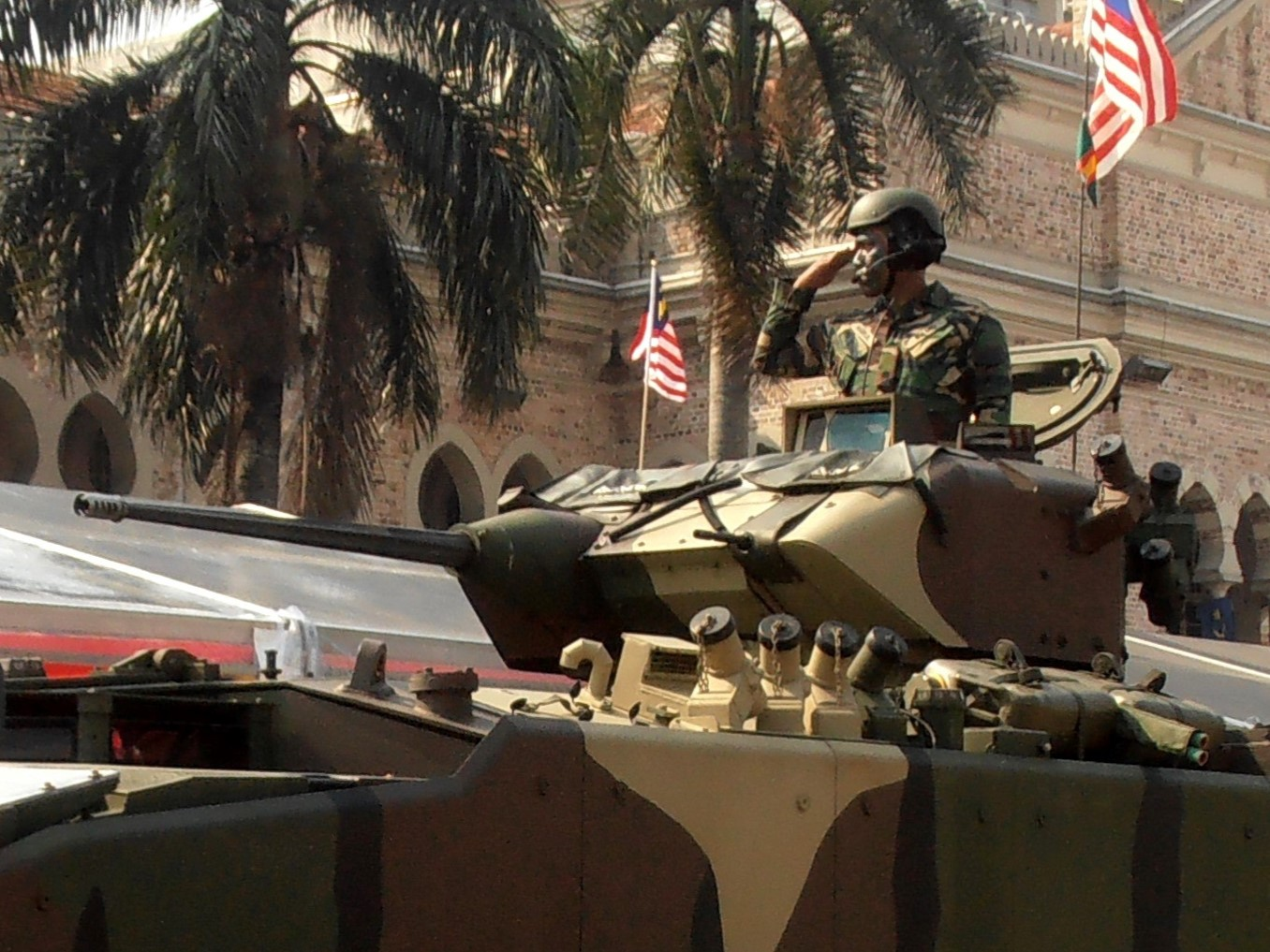
FNSS Sharpshooter Turret mounted on DefTech AV8

=== Tracked Armored Vehicles ===
- ACV-AAPC (advanced armored personnel carrier) — with a one-man turret with a 12.7 mm machine gun and ab7.62 mm machine gun; 13 troops carried.
- ACV-AIFV
  - AIFV with FMC EWS (assembled by DAF Special Products) turret with a 25 mm Oerlikon Contraves 25 mm cannon and a coaxial 7.62 mm machine gun
  - AIFV with Giat Dragar turret with a 25 mm M811 cannon and a coaxial 7.62 mm machine gun.
- ACV-ATV — Armored Tow Vehicle. Fitted with a Norwegian one-man turret with two BGM-71 TOW missiles in a ready to launch position, and four troops carried.
- ACV-AMV — Armored Mortar Vehicle. Fitted with an 81 mm mortar and a 7.62 mm machine gun.
- 120 mm AMV — A private venture, armed with a TDA 120 mm recoiling mortar in the rear of the vehicle.
- ACV-IFV Sharpshooter — IFV with FNSS Sharpshooter Turret. This variant is now being exported to Malaysia (ACV-300 Adnan).
- ACV with HMTS — armed with four Hellfire missiles in the ready to fire position.
- ACV-300 — Fitted with a 300 hp powerpack similar to the M113A3, but with high power.
- ACV-350 — Fitted with a 350 hp powerpack.
- ACV-S — A stretched version of the AIFV with an additional road wheel and extra armor giving resistance to 14.5mm AP projectiles, with an upgraded 350 or 400 hp powerpack. Weight is 18,000 kg. A variety of turrets are available, including 12.7mm, 25mm (FNSS Sharpshooter Turret) and 30 mm as well as an Eryx ATGM missile launcher and 120 mm mortar turret.
- ACV-15
- ACV-19
- ACV-30
- ACV-AD Air Defence
- LAWC-T
- KAPLAN 10 Anti-tank
- KAPLAN 20 NG-AFV New Generation Armored Fighting Vehicle
- KAPLAN MT Medium Tank — Integrated with Cockerill 105 mm high-pressure rifled gun
- KAPLAN 30 NG-AFV New Generation Armored Fighting Vehicle
- FNSS ZAHA Marine Assault Vehicle — Used by Amphibious Marine Brigade (Turkish Armed Forces)
- KAPLAN HYBRID Vehicle

=== Wheeled Armored Vehicles ===
- FNSS Pars
  - Pars III 6x6
  - Pars III 8x8
  - Pars 4x4 STA Anti-tank
  - Pars 6x6 Scout
  - Pars 6x6 CBRN vehicle
  - PARS ALPHA 8x8 AFV

PARS ALPHA 8x8 is a new generation armoured fighting vehicle. The vehicle’s main engine is placed on the front of the chassis so that the crew can have much better communication and situational awareness. It can reach the maximum speed of 115km per hour road speed with an 800 km operational range.

It is equipped with TEBER-II 30/40 remote controlled turret with 30 mm automatic cannon. This cannon can either be replaced with 40mm. Additional 7.62mm chain gun is mounted on the turret.

The vehicle can overcome %40 side slopes, %70 gradients, 2.4 meter trenches and 0.80 meter vertical obstacles.

=== Engineering Vehicles ===
- FNSS Samur SYHK wheeled amphibious armoured vehicle-launched bridge
- AZMİM Kunduz tracked amphibious combat engineering armoured bulldozer

=== Gun turrets ===
- FNSS Sharpshooter Turret
- Teber-30
- Teber-30/35
- UKTK
- Saber-25

=== Modernization ===
- ZMA-15 Infantry fighting vehicle modernization.
- M113 armored personnel carrier modernization.

== Similar companies ==
- Otokar
- Nurol
- BMC
- Katmerciler

== See also ==
- Armoured car (military)
- Armoured personnel carrier
- Armoured recovery vehicle
- Armoured warfare
- Lists of armoured fighting vehicles
- Non-military armoured vehicles
