= Nurol Bank =

- Native name: Nurol Yatırım Bankası A.Ş.
- Type: Corporation
- Industry: Banking, Financial services
- Headquarters: Maslak, Beşiktaş, Istanbul, Turkey
- Area served: Worldwide
- Key people: Ziya Akkurt (Chairman) Özgür Altuntaş (CEO)
- Products: List: Financial services, credit cards, consumer banking, corporate banking, investment banking, mortgage loans, private banking, pension, life insurance, brokerage, leasing, factoring, asset management
- Website: www.nurolbank.com.tr

Nurol Yatirim Bankasi (Nurol Investment Bank), aka Nurol Bank in English, started investment banking activities in 1999. The Bank operates under the regulatory purview of the Banking Regulation and Supervision Agency of Turkiye (BRSA).

== Overview ==
NurolBank is specialized in the field of corporate banking, investment banking, private banking, treasury and financial institutions.

== Ownership ==
The Bank is a subsidiary of Nurol Holding.The shares of the stock are privately held by members of the Çarmıklı family and Nurol Holding.

== See also ==
- List of banks in Turkey
