= Sharpshooter Turret =

FNSS Sharpshooter Turret
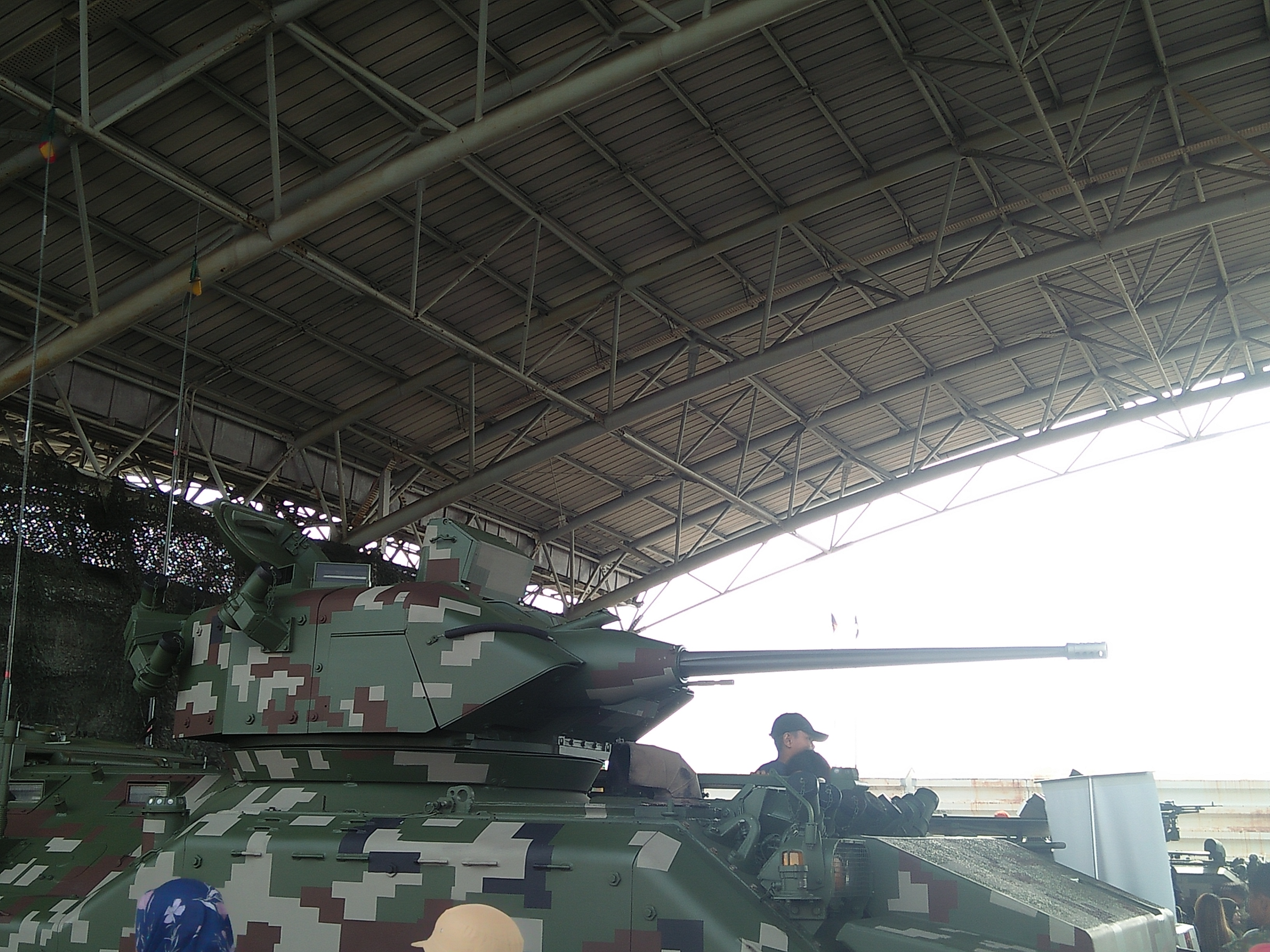
- Sharpshooter Turret mounted on Malaysian Army's ACV-300 Adnan
- Type: Turret
- Place of origin: Turkey

Service history
- Used by: Turkish Army

Production history
- Designer: FNSS Defence Systems, Turkey / BAE Systems, U.K.
- Manufacturer: FNSS Defence Systems

Specifications
- Mass: 1,500 kg
- Crew: 1
- Caliber: 25 mm caliber/ 40mm grenade/ 12.7mm
- Action: Chain gun
- Elevation: +49° to -8°
- Traverse: 360°
- Rate of fire: 200 rounds per minute
- Muzzle velocity: 1,100 m/s (3,610 ft/s)
- Effective firing range: 2,000m (1.2 miles)
- Maximum firing range: 6,800m (4.23 miles)
- Feed system: Dual feed
- Sights: Day/Night Secondary Sight: Four M27 Unity Vision Periscopes
- Armor: Protection against 14.5×114mm
- Main armament: 25 mm Giat M811 cannon with dual feed or 40 mm grenade launcher or 12.7 mm machine gun
- Secondary armament: 7.62 mm MAG58 or M240C

The Sharpshooter Turret was developed by BAE Systems (FMC and later United Defense) in 1980. In 1995–1997 it was updated for production by BAE Systems and FNSS Defence Systems. The turret is a one-man stabilized turret and can be equipped with one of three configurations: dual-weapon system incorporating a rapid-firing M242 Bushmaster 25 mm cannon, or 40 mm grenade launcher, or 12.7 mm machine gun, along with a coaxially mounted 7.62 mm machine gun. These weapons are mechanically linked to a gunner’s day/night sighting system incorporating a thermal imager and laser rangefinder.

The turret is fitted with an all-electrical drive system, which incorporates a 2 axis stabilization for firing on the move.

The Sharpshooter’s main armament has two primary functions: defeat lightly armored threat vehicles and provide responsive fire support. Fire support not only aids dismounted infantry, but also allows pockets of enemy resistance to be suppressed quickly, permitting the infantry to remain mounted and the momentum of mechanized operations to be sustained. It is also very effective in urban operations where single-shot precision firing is required to engage targets in upper floors of buildings.

== Users ==
- Turkey
- Malaysia
