= List of aircraft of the Malaysian Armed Forces =

This list identifies the military aircraft which are currently being operated, or have formerly been operated, by the Malaysian Armed Forces.

== Current aircraft ==
=== Malaysian Army ===
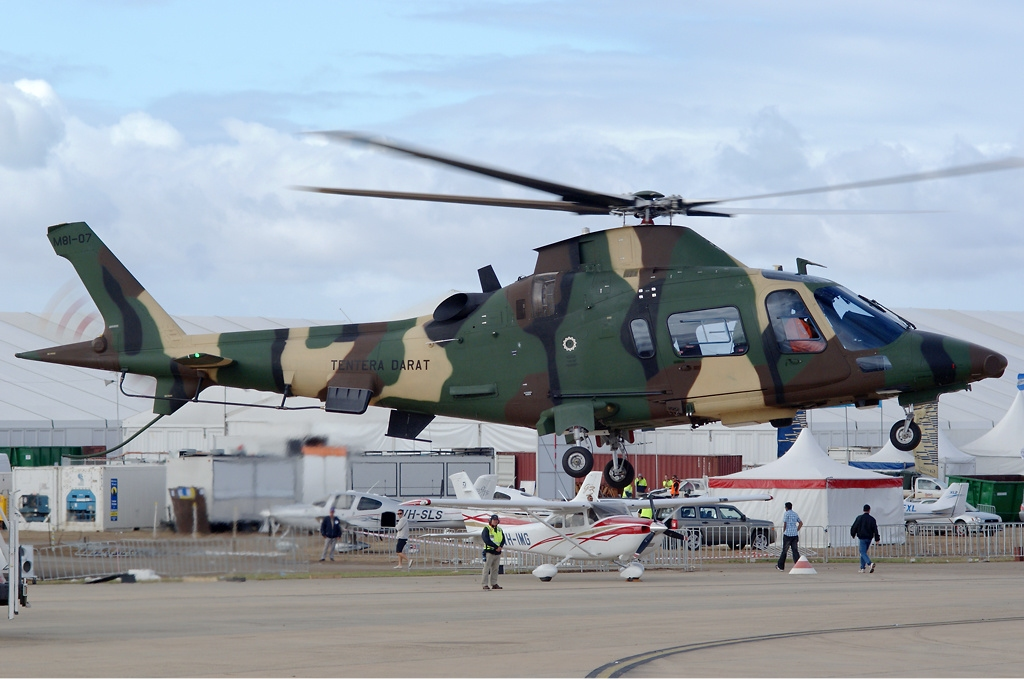
AW109 of Malaysian Army

Aircraft	Origin	Type	Variant	In service	Notes
Helicopter
MD530	United States	Light attack	MD530G	6	
AgustaWestland AW109	Italy	Scout / Utility	A109LUH	10	1 crashed in 2014. Armed with 20 mm guns and rockets.
AgustaWestland AW149	Italy	Utility		0+(4)	4 on order. Delivery in 2027.
Unmanned aerial vehicle
FlyEye	Poland	Surveillance		unknown	
CW-25D	China	Surveillance		6	6 drones and 2 command vehicles.
CW-15	China	Surveillance		unknown	
CW-007	China	Surveillance		unknown	
Aerobo Wing AS-VTO2	Japan	Surveillance		6	
Schiebel Camcopter S-100	Austria	Surveillance		unknown	
DJI Matrice	China	Surveillance		unknown	
DJI Mavic	China	Surveillance		unknown	
SkyRanger R60	Canada	Surveillance		unknown	

=== Royal Malaysian Navy ===
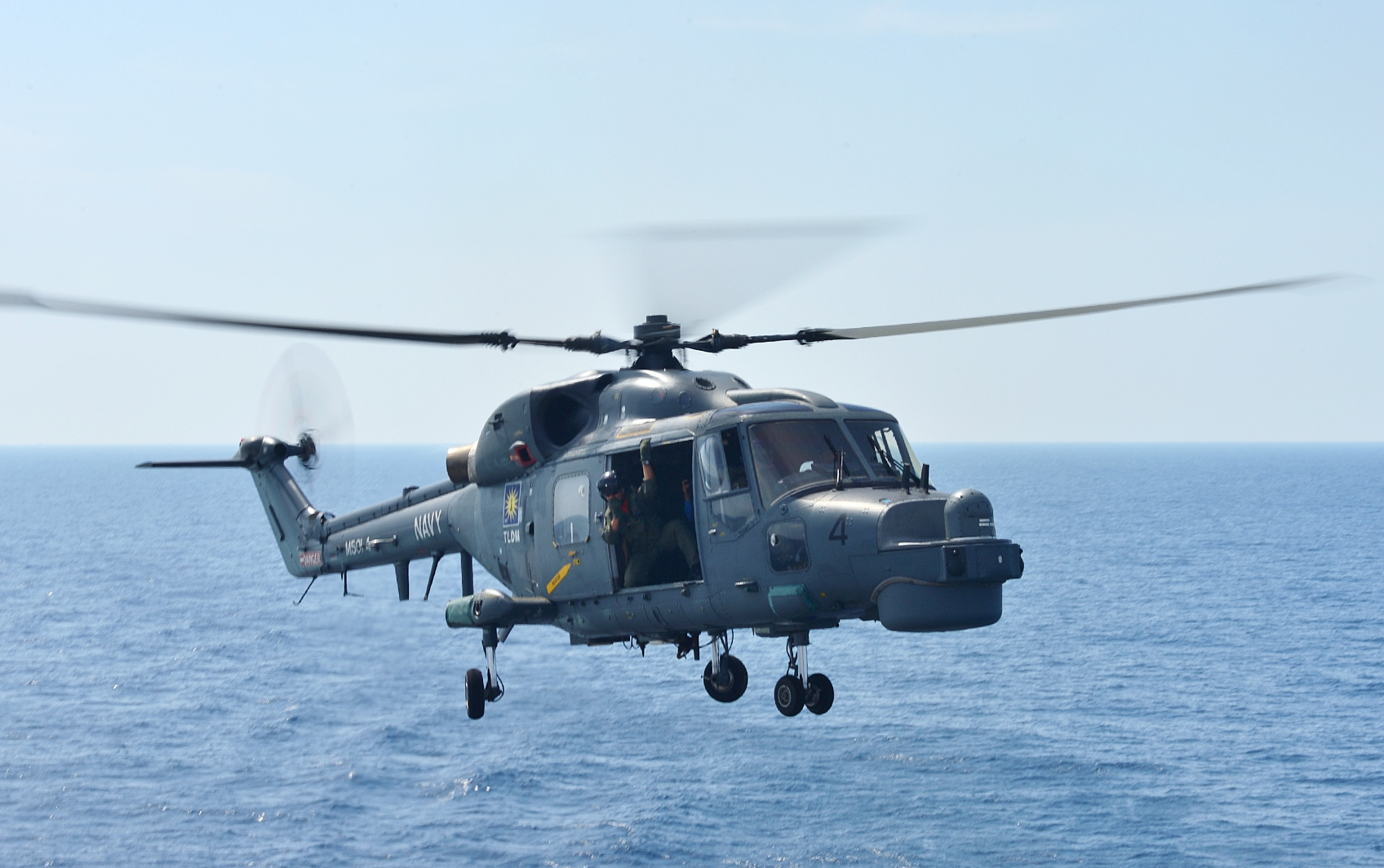
A Super Lynx Mk 300 ASW helicopter

Aircraft	Origin	Type	Variant	In service	Notes
Helicopter
Westland Lynx	United Kingdom	ASW / SAR	Mk 300	5	Armed with either the 4 Sea Skua missile or 2 A244 torpedoes. M501-03 mishap (emergency landing) in 2025.
Eurocopter Fennec	France	Surveillance / Utility	AS555SN	4	Total of 6 in inventory. M502-03 mishap (emergency landing) in 2021. M502-06 crashed (mid-air collision) in 2024.
AgustaWestland AW139	Italy	Surveillance / Utility	AW139HOM	2+(2)	Total of 3 in inventory. M503-03 crashed (mid-air collision) in 2024. Two more acquired in 2024.
Unmanned aerial vehicle
Scan Eagle	United States	Surveillance		18	
Aerobo Wing AS-VTO2	Japan	Surveillance		6	

== Retired aircraft ==
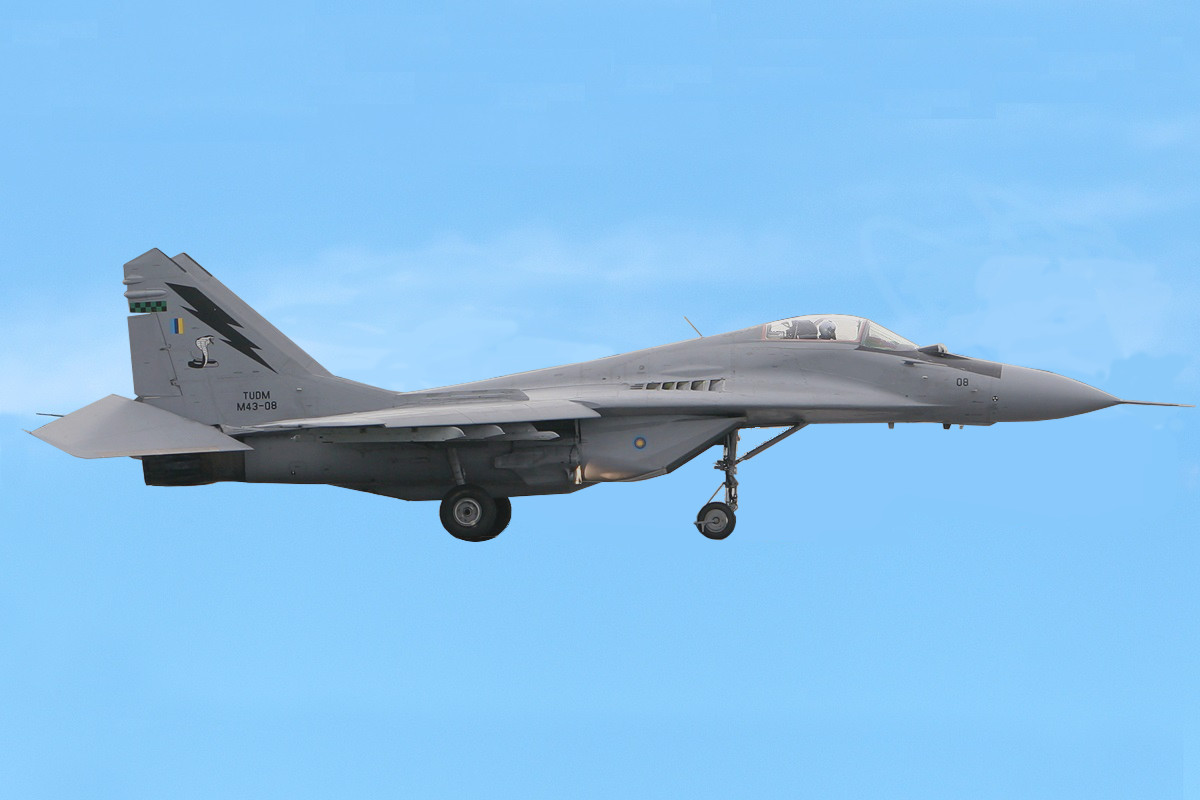
MiG-29N in training

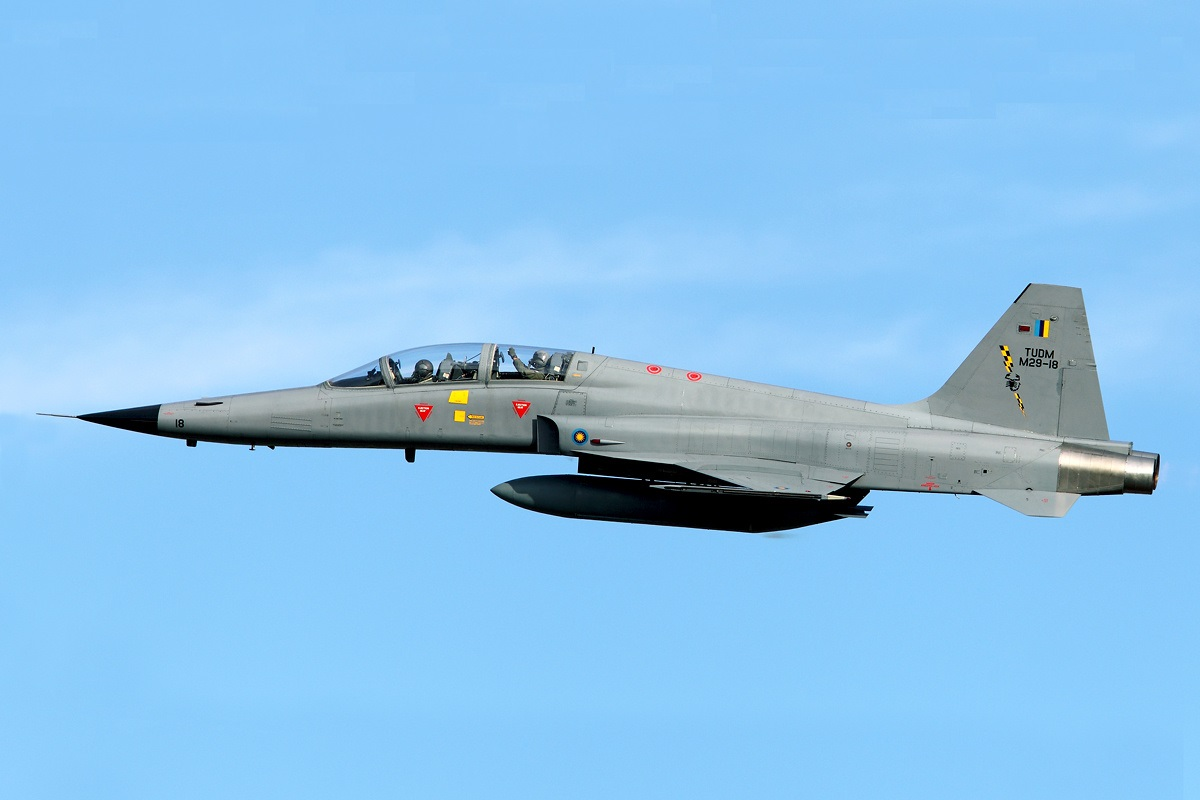
F-5 Tiger II of the Royal Malaysian Air Force

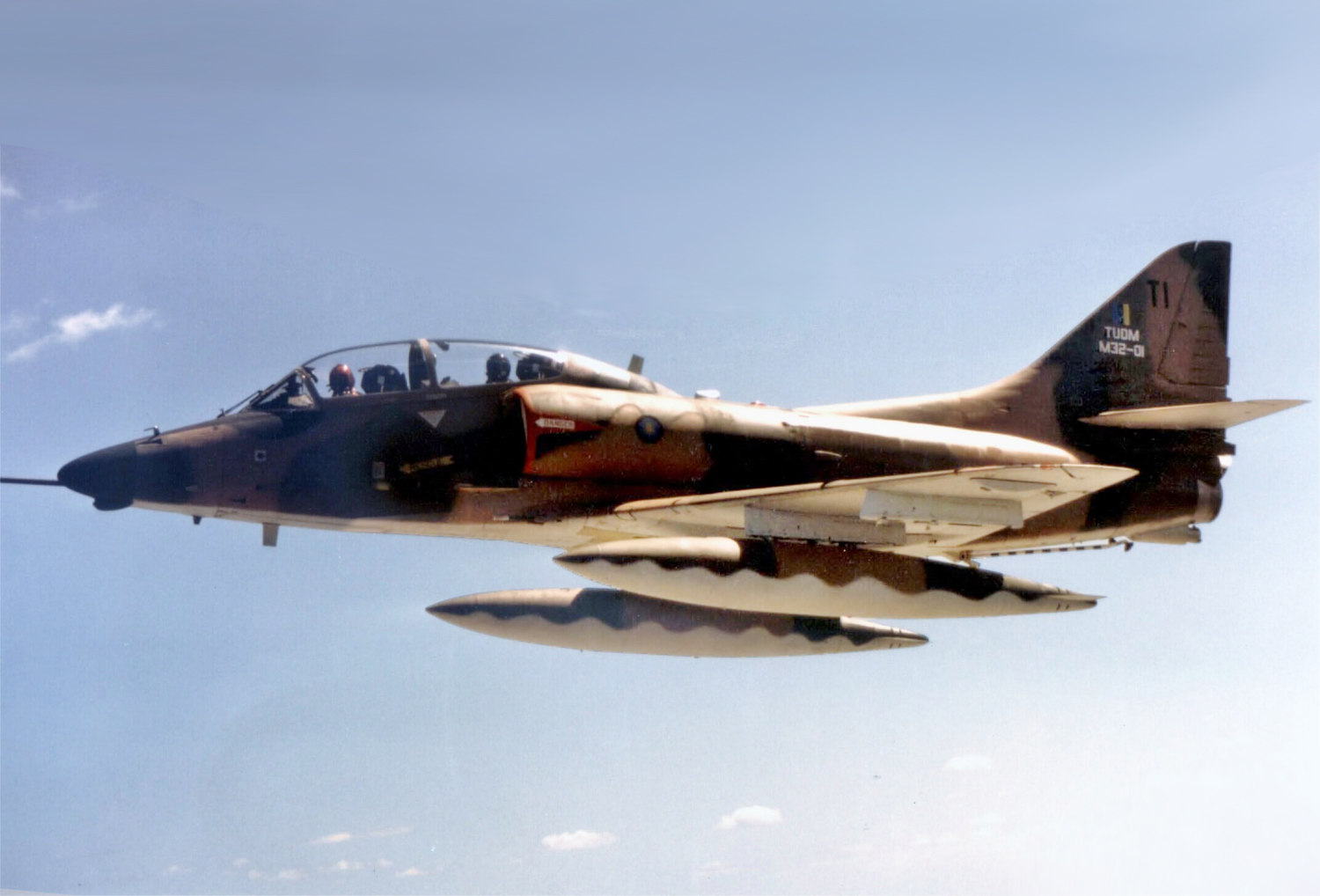
A-4PTM Skyhawk in flight

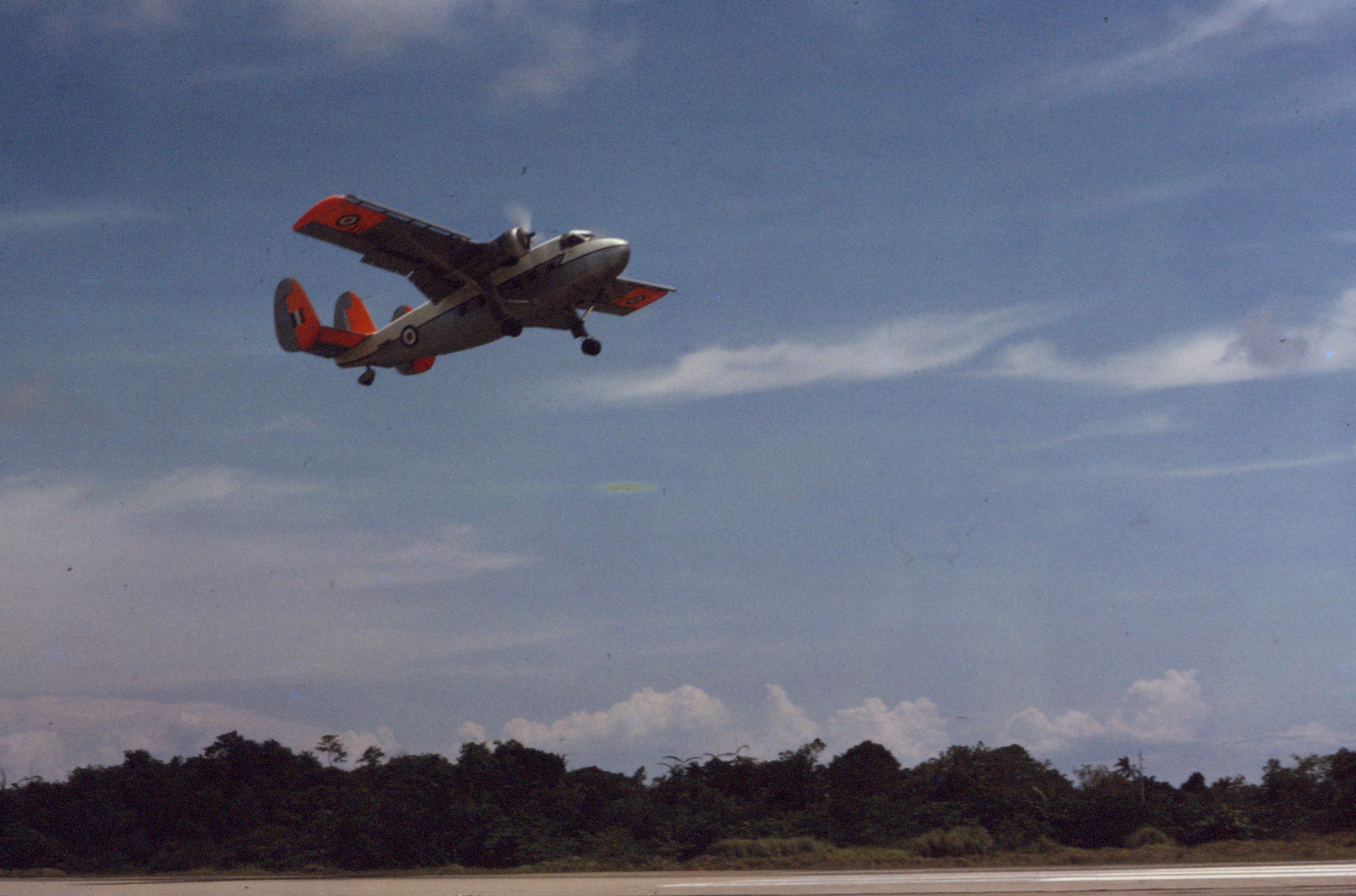
Scottish Aviation Twin Pioneer at Labuan

Aircraft	Origin	Type	Variant	In service	Notes
Combat aircraft
MiG-29	Russia	Multirole		16	Retired from service.
A-4 Skyhawk	United States	Attack	A-4 PTM	40	Retired from service.
Northrop F-5	United States	Fighter	F-5E/F	20	Retired from service.
CAC Sabre	United States / Australia	Fighter		18	Retired from service.
Canadair CT-114 Tutor	Canada	COIN	CL-41G Tebuan	20	Retired from service.
Transport
Boeing 737	United States	VIP		1	Retired from service.
Dassault Falcon 900	France	VIP		1	Retired from service.
British Aerospace 125	United Kingdom	VIP		1	Retired from service.
Cessna 310	United States	Light utility		3	Retired from service.
Scottish Aviation Twin Pioneer	United Kingdom	Utility		15	Retired from service.
Scottish Aviation Pioneer	United Kingdom	Utility		9	Retired from service.
Grumman HU-16 Albatross	United States	SAR / Utility		2	Amphibious aircraft. Retired from service.
de Havilland Canada DHC-4	Canada	Utility / Transport		11	Retired from service.
Handley Page Dart Herald	United Kingdom	Utility	Series 400	8	Retired from service.
de Havilland Dove	United Kingdom	Utility		5	Retired from service.
de Havilland Heron	United Kingdom	Utility		unknown	Retired from service.
Helicopter
Sikorsky SH-3 Sea King	United States	SAR / Utility	S-61A4 Nuri	15	Retired from service.
Bell 47	United States	Utility / Training	47G	5	Retired from service.
Alouette III	France	Liaison	SA 319	24	Retired from service.
Westland Wasp	United Kingdom	ASW / SAR	HAS. 1	12	Flew with the Royal Malaysian Navy. Retired from service.
Eurocopter AS332	France	Transport / VIP	AS332L	1	Retired from service.
Trainer aircraft
Aermacchi MB-339	Italy	Jet trainer	MB-339AM/339CM	21	Retired from service.
SME Aero Tiga	Switzerland / Malaysia	Trainer		20	Retired from service.
Bulldog T1	United Kingdom	Basic trainer	102	11	Retired from service.
Percival Provost	United Kingdom	Basic trainer	T.51	24	Retired from service.
Unmanned aerial vehicle
Eagle ARV	Australia / Malaysia	Optionally piloted UAV		3	Retired from service.
CTRM Aludra	Malaysia	Surveillance UAV	Aludra Mk 1	3	Retired from service.

== See also ==
- List of equipment of the Malaysian Army
- List of equipment of the Royal Malaysian Navy
- List of equipment of the Royal Malaysian Air Force
- List of equipment of the Malaysian Maritime Enforcement Agency
- List of vehicles of the Royal Malaysian Police
- List of police firearms in Malaysia

== Bibliography ==
- Capper, N. J. "Prestwick's STOL Pioneer". Air Enthusiast, No. 10, July–September 1979, pp. 22–25. ISSN 0143-5450
