= CTRM =

CTRM may refer to

- Critical Test Results Management, medical reporting software
- Composites Technology Research Malaysia, a Malaysian company involved in the aerospace and composites industries
