= CTRM Aludra =

Malaysian unmanned aerial vehicle

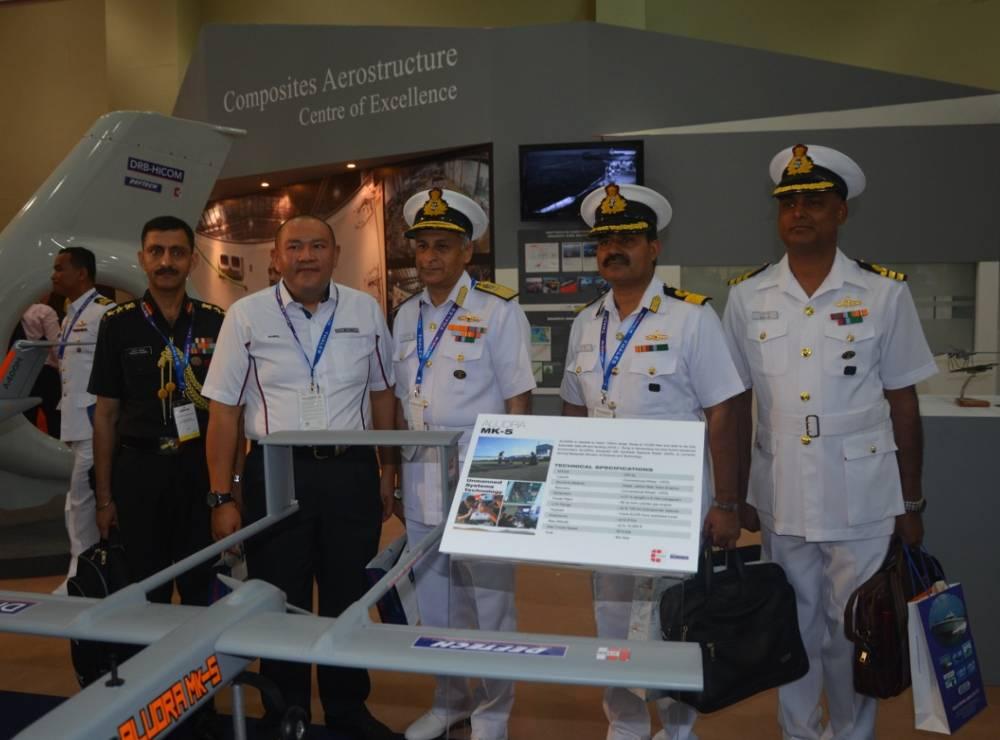
- Aludra Mk5 scale model in display

General information
- Type: Unmanned Aerial Vehicle (UAV)
- National origin: Malaysia
- Designer: Composites Technology Research Malaysia; DefTech
- Status: In service
- Primary user: Malaysian Remote Sensing Agency
- Number built: 15+

History
- Manufactured: 2010–present
- First flight: 2007

Aludra is a Malaysian unmanned aerial vehicle operating since 2010. The Aludra was designed and manufactured by Composites Technology Research Malaysia which is now under DefTech.

== Design and development ==
To fulfill the Malaysian Armed Forces needs in UAV operation, Malaysia formed a consortium on 15 January 2007 involves of local company which is Composite Technology Research Malaysia (CTRM), Unmanned Systems Technology (UST) and Ikramatic to develop indigenous made UAV.

On March 28, 2022, Deftech unveiled a new UAV at the DSA 2022 convention under the brand name Aludra EE.

== Operational history ==
Aludra already used in combat on 2013 in Ops Daulat to monitor Kiram's militant movement. After the Sabah incursion, Aludra is stationed at Sabah to perform the surveillance and reconnaissance mission in Sabah's border.

== Variants ==
=== Aludra Mk1 ===
First production of the UAV. 15 build and currently in service with Malaysian Armed Forces.

=== Aludra Mk2 ===
Improved version of Aludra with better engine, payload and endurance.

=== Aludra Mk5 ===
Unveiled during LIMA 2015.

=== Aludra UAV RS ===
Prototype released on 2018.

=== Aludra Camar ===
Aludra Camar made its maiden flight in July 2017 and its expected to be completed by 2019.The UAV has designed to carry out surveillance and mapping missions.

=== Aludra SR-10 ===
Lightweight UAV designed for light surveillance role.

=== Aludra EE ===
Prototype released on 2022.

== Operators ==
=== Current operators ===
Malaysia:

- Malaysian Remote Sensing Agency with 2 Mk5s in service.

=== Former operators ===
Malaysia:

- Malaysian Army
- Royal Malaysian Air Force
