= Eagle Aircraft X-TS =

1990s Australian light aircraft

X-TS

General information
- Type: Light aircraft
- National origin: Australia
- Manufacturer: Eagle Aircraft
- Number built: 12

History
- First flight: April 1988
- Developed from: Eagle Aircraft EX-P1
- Developed into: Eagle Aircraft Eagle 150

The Eagle Aircraft X-TS, known as the Eagle Aircraft X-Wing in its prototype form and retroactively as the Eagle Aircraft Eagle 100, is an Australian light aircraft developed in the 1980s and manufactured in the 1990s. It has an unconventional tandem wing design and a structure of composite materials. It was marketed for a range of general aviation purposes, including basic training, aerial survey, and cattle mustering. It was replaced in production by the Eagle Aircraft Eagle 150, and some Eagle 100s were remanufactured into this later model. The "TS" in the designation stood for "two-seat", in contrast to Eagle's development aircraft, the EX-P1, which was a single-seater.

== Design ==
The Eagle 100 has a low-mounted forward wing and shoulder-mounted rear wing. The pilot and a single passenger sit side-by-side in a cockpit fully enclosed under a bubble canopy. Power is supplied by a piston engine in the nose, driving a tractor-mounted propeller. It has a conventional tail and fixed, tricycle undercarriage.

The aircraft's unusual design aimed to ensure good and safe flying characteristics in hazardous, low-altitude operations, such as on farms. It was intended to be extremely difficult to stall, to maintain good control up to the point of stall, and to be almost impossible to spin.

Construction was of composite materials throughout, although with differences between the X-Wing prototype and the X-TS production aircraft. The X-Wing was built mostly of fibreglass, while production aircraft were built from Kevlar, carbon fibre, Nomex honeycomb, and advanced resins.

== Development ==
Composite Industries (later renamed to Eagle Aircraft) of Western Australia announced development of the X-TS in 1986.

The prototype, registration VH-XEG, first flew in April 1988, originally powered by a 58-kilowatt (78 hp) Aeropower engine. During flight testing, this was replaced by a 74.6-kilowatt (100 hp) Continental O-200. When testing was complete in October that year, the X-TS had flown 200 hours and met all of its design goals. Other plans around this time included the development of a 75-kilowatt (100 hp), three-cylinder, two-stroke engine to power the aircraft, and a military variant of the Eagle with provision for underwing stores and Kevlar armour as protection against small arms fire.

In 1989, Composite changed its name to Eagle Aircraft Australia and listed on the Australian Stock Exchange (ticker symbol ASX:EAA, now defunct). The company planned to start production of the Eagle that same year, at Cockburn, Western Australia, but this was contingent on loan guarantees from the Government of Western Australia which did not materialise. This led the company to look for overseas investment.

Overseas finance was obtained on 31 December 1990 with the signing of a joint venture between Eagle and Assets Accretion, the commercial body of the Malaysian Ministry of Finance. Production was scheduled to start on 1 March 1991.

Component manufacturing commenced on schedule. A pre-production example, registered VH-XEP, flew on 6 November 1992, powered by a Teledyne Continental IO-240-A engine. Series production began in August 1993.

The X-TS received Australian FAR33 certification on 21 September 1993, but did not qualify for a European JAR-VLA certificate. This led to some design changes, including a switch to the IO-240-B engine, and using pre-impregnated composites for construction.

Delivery to customers began in December 1993, with the first going to the Western Australian Department of Conservation and Land Management. A total of ten X-TSes were built, of which five were later rebuilt as Eagle 150s. As of 2024, none remain on the Australian registry.

Production of Eagle Aircraft in Australia ended with the original X-TS. On 28 May 1993, the Malaysian government bought out their Australian partner and commenced relocation of all production to Malaysia.

== Specifications (production X-TS) ==
Data from Lambert & Munson 1994, p.6

General characteristics

- Crew: One pilot
- Capacity: 1 passenger
- Length: 6.53 m (21 ft 5 in)
- Wingspan: 7.15 m (23 ft 5 in)
- Height: 2.26 m (7 ft 5 in)
- Wing area: 5.02 m^{2} (54.0 sq ft)
- Empty weight: 327 kg (721 lb)
- Max takeoff weight: 567 kg (1,250 lb)
- Powerplant: 1 × Teledyne Continental IO-240-A four-cylinder, horizontally-opposed, air-cooled piston engine, 93.2 kW (125.0 hp)

Performance

- Maximum speed: 266 km/h (165 mph, 144 kn)
- Cruise speed: 241 km/h (150 mph, 130 kn)
- Range: 1,302 km (809 mi, 703 nmi)
- Service ceiling: 5,485 m (17,995 ft)

== Notes ==
=== Bibliography ===
- The 1998 ASX Delisted Companies Book. Brisbane: Australian Stock Exchange. 1998.
- "Aircraft register". Civil Aviation Safety Authority.
- Davisson, Budd (February 1996). "All Part of a Long-Range Plan". Sport Aviation. Vol. 45, no. 2. Oshkosh, Wisconsin: Experimental Aircraft Association.
- Eyre, David C. (8 May 2019). "Eagle Aircraft Eagle X-TS". Aeropedia.
- Jackson, Paul, ed. (1995). Jane's All the World's Aircraft 1995-96 (86th ed.). Coulsdon, Surrey, United Kingdom: Jane's Information Group.
- Lambert, Mark; Munson, Kenneth; Taylor, Michael J.H., eds. (1991). Jane's All the World's Aircraft 1991-92 (82nd ed.). Coulson, Surrey, UK: Jane's Information Group.
- Lambert, Mark; Munson, Kenneth, eds. (1994). Jane's All the World's Aircraft 1994-95 (85th ed.). Coulson, Surrey, UK: Jane's Information Group.
- Taylor, Michael J. H. (1993). Jane's Encyclopedia of Aviation. London: Studio Editions.
