= FNSS ACV-15 =

ACV-15
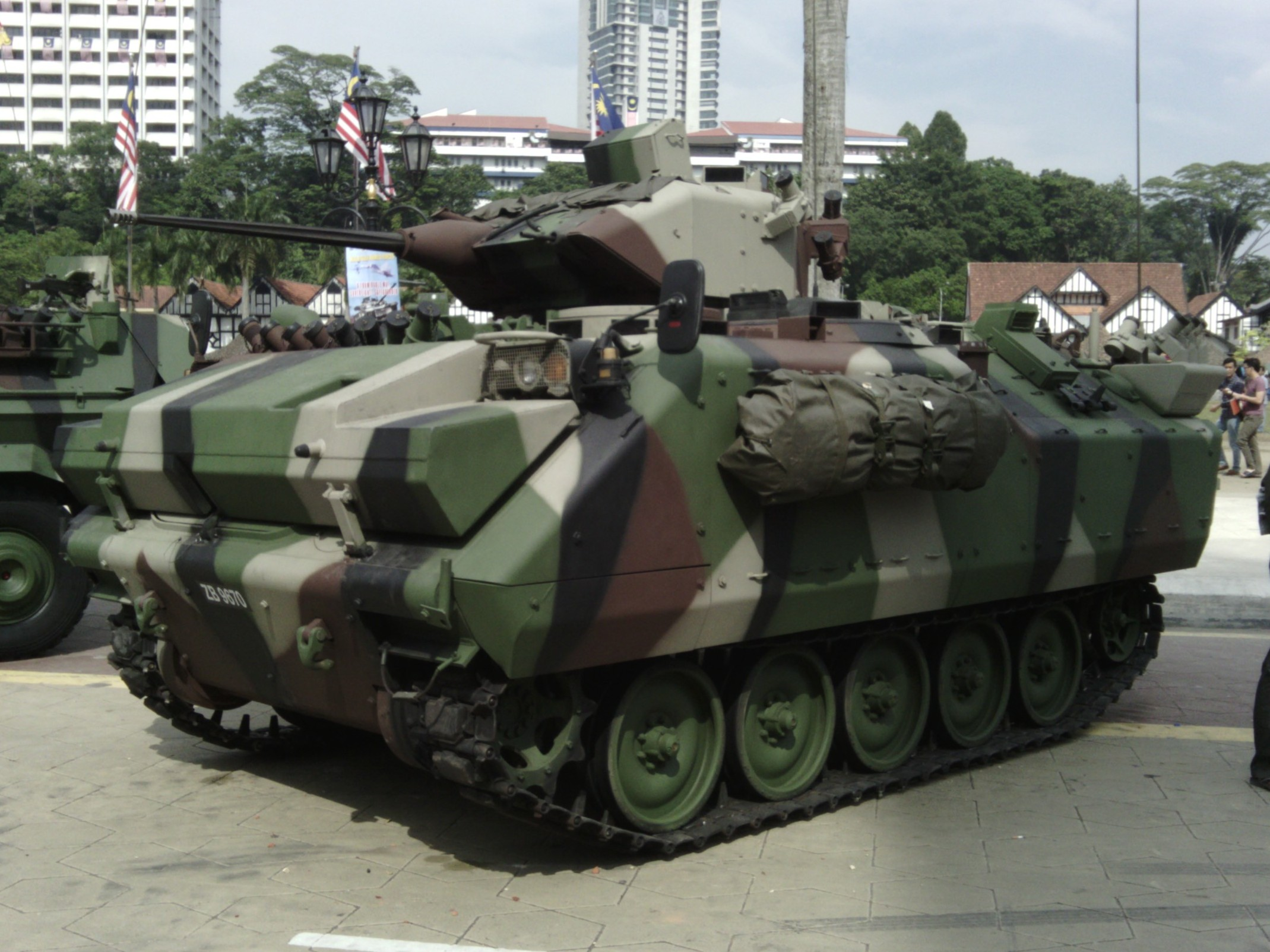
- ACV-300 Adnan of Malaysian Army
- Type: Infantry fighting vehicle
- Place of origin: Turkey

Service history
- In service: 1992–present
- Used by: See Users
- Wars: Kurdish–Turkish conflict United Nations Operation in Somalia II; 2013 Lahad Datu standoff Turkish military intervention in Syria; Libyan Civil War (2014–present); Battle of Marawi

Production history
- Manufacturer: FNSS Defence Systems; DefTech
- Produced: 1992–present
- No. built: 2,945

Specifications
- Mass: 14 tonnes
- Length: 5.26 m (17.3 ft)
- Width: 2.83 m (9.3 ft)
- Height: 2.88 m (9.4 ft)
- Crew: 3 + 8
- Armor: Protection up to 14.5×114mm armor-piercing rounds
- Main armament: 25mm FNSS Sharpshooter Turret
- Secondary armament: 7.62mm Machine gun
- Engine: Detroit Diesel Model 6V-53T 5.2 litre 300 hp
- Power/weight: 21.43 hp/tonne
- Transmission: Allison X200-4 with 4 forward and one reverse
- Suspension: torsion bar 350 mm
- Ground clearance: 0.4 m (1 ft 4 in)
- Fuel capacity: 416 litres (92 imp gal; 110 US gal)
- Operational range: 490 km (300 mi)
- Maximum speed: 65 km/h (40 mph)

ACV-15 is the designation of an amphibious Infantry fighting vehicle family developed by the Turkish defense company FNSS Savunma Sistemleri A.Ş. This vehicle is also manufactured by DRB-HICOM Defence Technologies (DefTech) in Malaysia. The design is an attempt to combine the capabilities of an infantry fighting vehicle (IFV) and an armoured personnel carrier (APC). The ACV-15 is based on the Dutch YPR-765, a derivative of American Advanced Infantry Fighting Vehicle, which in turn is a further development of the M113A1 armored personnel carrier.

== History ==
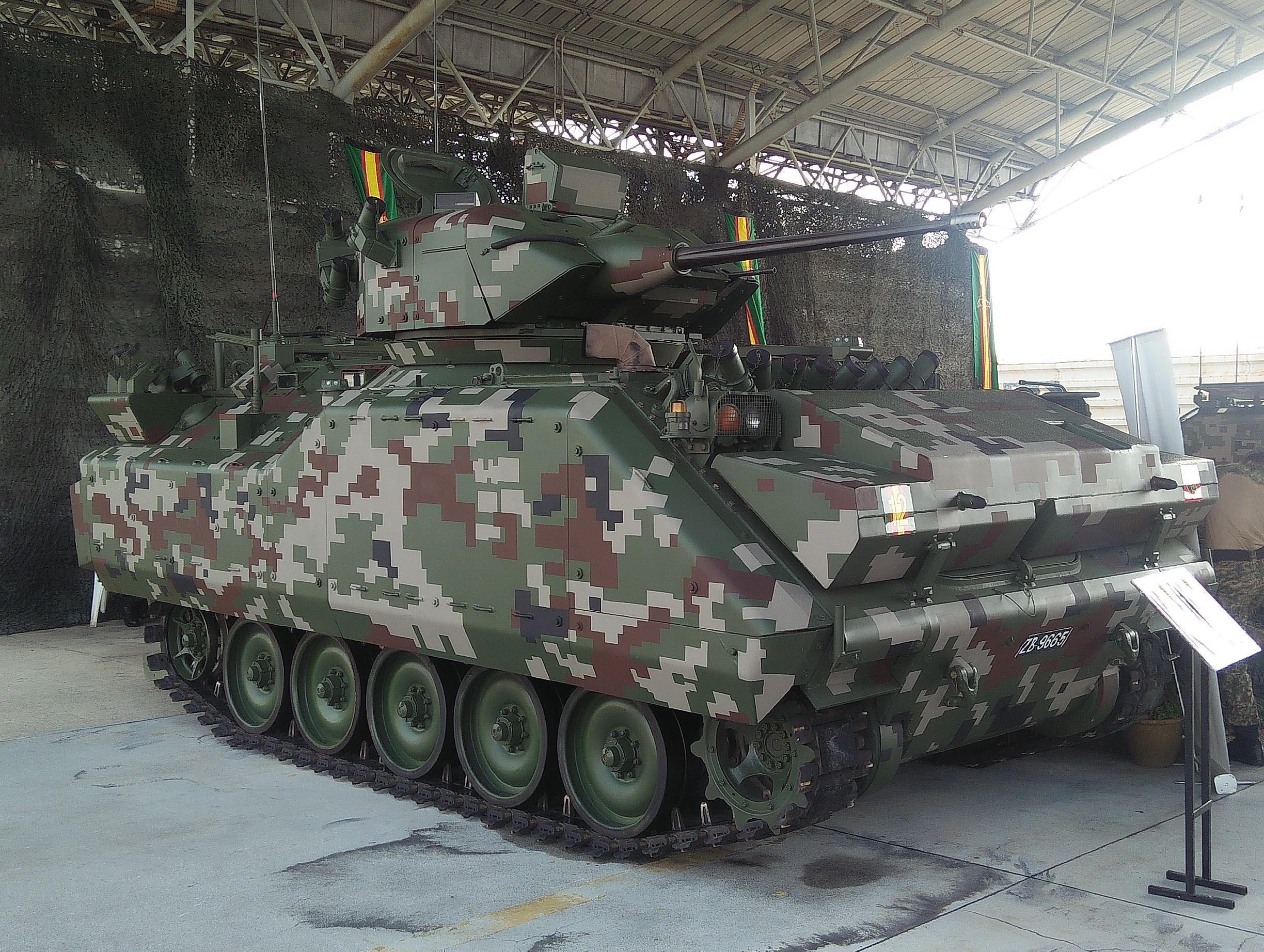
ACV-300 Adnan of Malaysian Army in digital camouflage

FNSS developed the ACV-15 based on the AIFV to meet the Turkish Land Forces Command's (TLFC's) operational requirement. The first production vehicles were delivered in 1992. The basic AIFV has a one-person power-operated turret armed with a 25 mm cannon and 7.62mm co-axial machine gun. FNSS Defense Systems' latest development is the Armored Combat Vehicle – New Generation which has an additional roadwheel each side. This can undertake a wider range of battlefield missions as it has greater internal volume and load-carrying capability. The vehicle is fully amphibious, propelled in the water by its tracks. Standard equipment includes passive night vision equipment, an NBC (nuclear, biological, chemical) protection system and smoke grenade launchers.

The AIFV is in service with Turkey (2,249) and the United Arab Emirates (136 delivered). Malaysia ordered 211 ACV-15 in different versions in 2000, and a further 56 in 2008.

The Malaysian variant of the AIFV entered service as the ACV-300 Adnan and is a result of a collaboration between FNSS and DefTech. They are nicknamed the Adnan after Adnan bin Saidi, a Malayan lieutenant considered a war hero for his actions in the Battle of Singapore during World War II. Some ACV-300s were received as kits and assembled in Pekan, Pahang. 12 units were deployed against Sulu militants in the 2013 Lahad Datu standoff.

The ACV-15 can be fitted with a number of turret choices to tailor to individual customer requirements. They are also equipped with firing ports, which allows infantrymen to fire their weapons from within the vehicle.

The ACV-15 has also been fitted with the turret of a BMP-3 infantry combat vehicle, produced by KBP Instrument Design Bureau of Tula, Russia. The system is called ACV-SW. The BMP-3 turret is armed with a 2A70 100mm semi-automatic rifled gun/missile launcher, which can fire either HE-Frag (High-Explosive Fragmentation) rounds or the 9M117 laser beamriding anti-tank missile.

The Adnan feature KVH TacNav navigation system incorporating GPS, LWD Avimo laser warning device, Wegmann type 76mm grenade launchers, NBC filtration system and ANVVS-2 night vision system.

== Variants ==
=== Turkish service variants ===
- ACV-AAPC (Advanced Armored Personnel Carrier) — with a one-man turret with a 12.7 mm machine gun and a 7.62 mm machine gun; 13 troops carried.
- ACV-AIFV
  - AIFV with FMC EWS (assembled by DAF Special Products) turret with a 25 mm Oerlikon Contraves 25 mm cannon and a coaxial 7.62 mm machine gun.
  - AIFV with Giat Dragar turret with a 25 mm M811 cannon and a coaxial 7.62 mm machine gun.
- ACV-ATV — Armored Tow Vehicle. Fitted with a Norwegian one-man turret with two BGM-71 TOW missiles in a ready to launch position, and four troops carried.
- ACV-AMV — Armored Mortar Vehicle. Fitted with an 81 mm mortar and a 7.62 mm machine gun.

=== Turkish private variants ===
- 120mm AMV — A private venture, armed with a TDA 120 mm recoiling mortar in the rear of the vehicle. Not in service.
- ACV-IFV Sharpshooter — IFV with FNSS Sharpshooter Turret variant exported to Malaysia as the ACV-300 Adnan.
- ACV with HMTS — Armed with four Hellfire missiles in the ready to fire position.
- ACV-300 — Fitted with a 300 hp powerpack similar to the M113A3, but with high power.
- ACV-350 — Fitted with a 350 hp powerpack.
- ACV-S — A stretched version of the AIFV with an additional road wheel and extra armor giving resistance to 14.5mm AP projectiles, with an upgraded 350 or 400 hp powerpack. Weight is 18,000 kg. A variety of turrets are available, including 12.7mm, 25 mm (FNSS Sharpshooter Turret) and 30 mm as well as an Eryx missile launcher and 120 mm mortar turret.

=== Malaysian service variants ===
(Non-exhaustive list)

- ACV-300
  - Fitted with a Sharpshooter Turret with a 25mm cannon and 7.62 mm machine gun.
  - Fitted with a turreted 12.7 mm and 7.62 mm machine gun.
  - Fitted with a turreted 40mm grenade launcher.
  - Fitted with Baktar Shikan anti-tank missile launcher.
  - Fitted with an 81 mm mortar.
  - Fitted with 120 mm 2R2M mortar (based on the ACV-S).
  - Armoured recovery vehicle.
  - Command post vehicle.
  - Ambulance vehicle.

== Operators ==
- Jordan 100 ACV-S in service.
- Malaysia 267 ACV-300 Adnan in service.
- Philippines 6 ACV-300 in service.
- Turkey 2,249 ACV-15 in service. Some of these are given to Free Syrian Army (FSA) forces. Since 2016, ACV-15s have been used by the FSA against ISIL and YPG during Operation Euphrates Shield.
- United Arab Emirates 133 ACV-15 in service.
- Libya Used by the GNA during the 2019-20 Tripoli offensive (at least 50).

== Former operators ==
- Ba'athist Syria 1 ACV-15, Syrian Arab Army captured an ACV-15 from ISIL, after ISIL captured it from the Turkish Army.

== Gallery ==
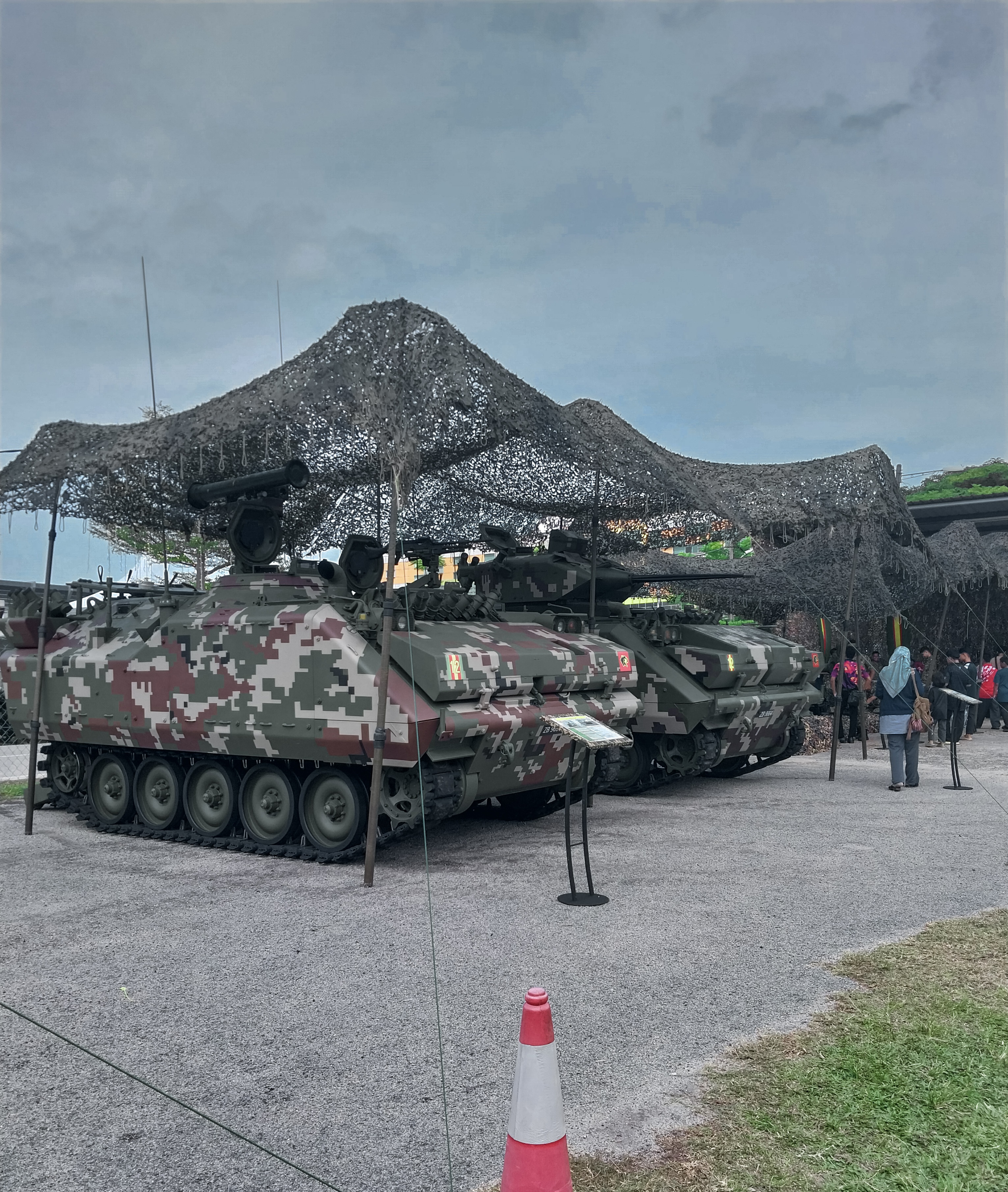
ACV-300 Adnan of Malaysian Army on display (2024).

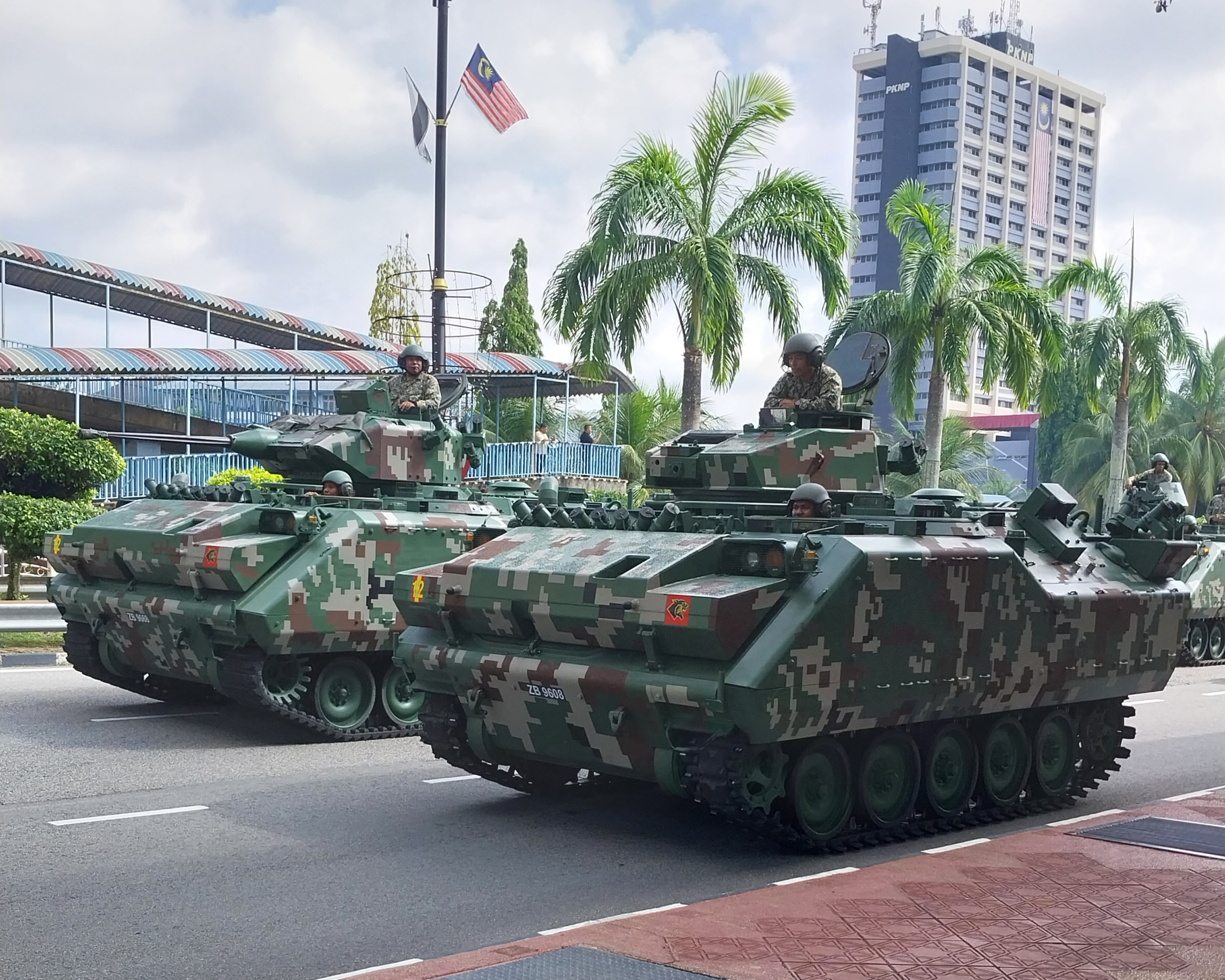
ACV-300 Adnan of Malaysian Army in formation during NDP 2023 in Kuantan.

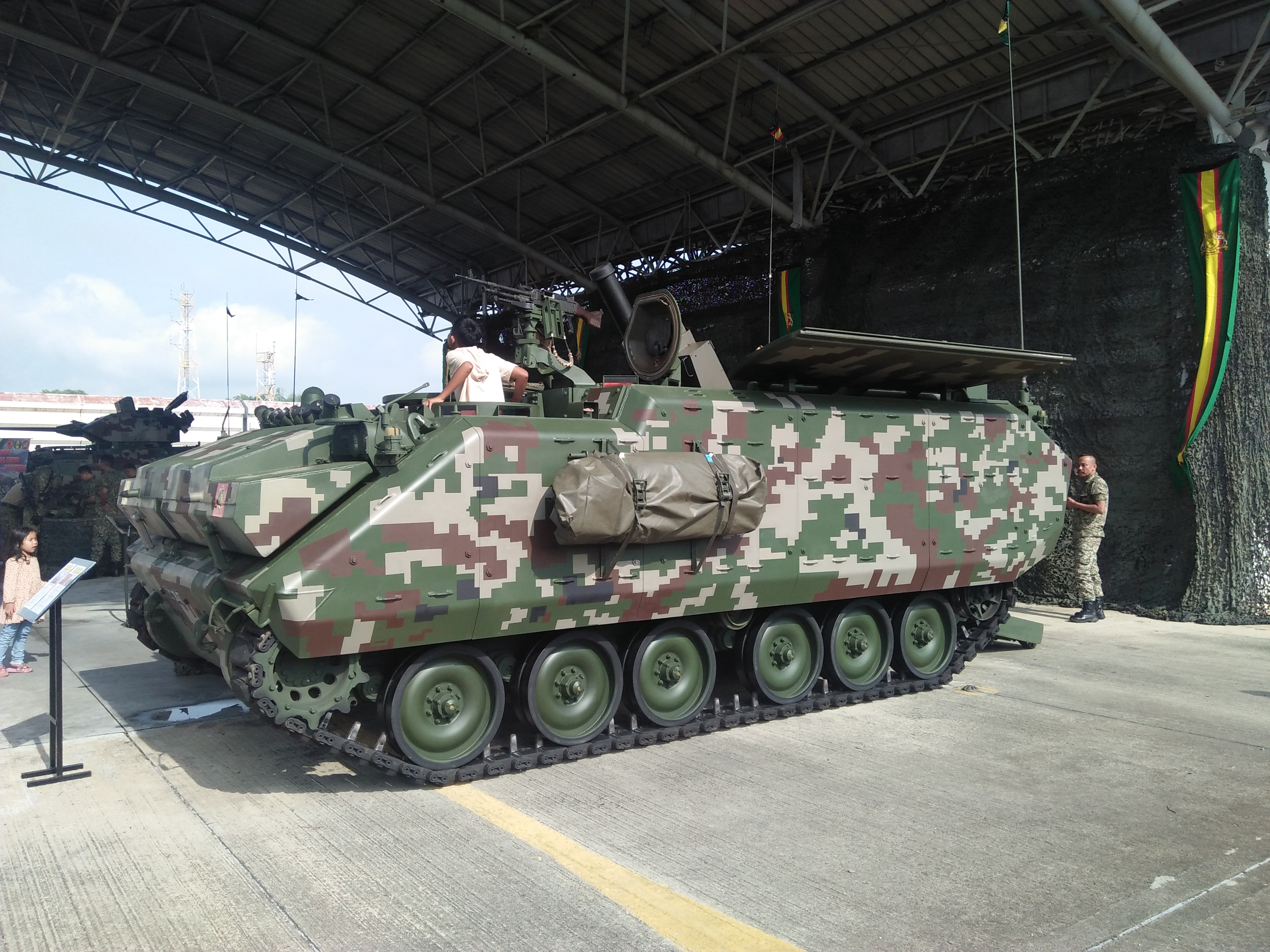
Malaysian Army ACV-300 Adnan 2R2M mortar variant. This DefTech stretched version has six wheels instead of the typical five.

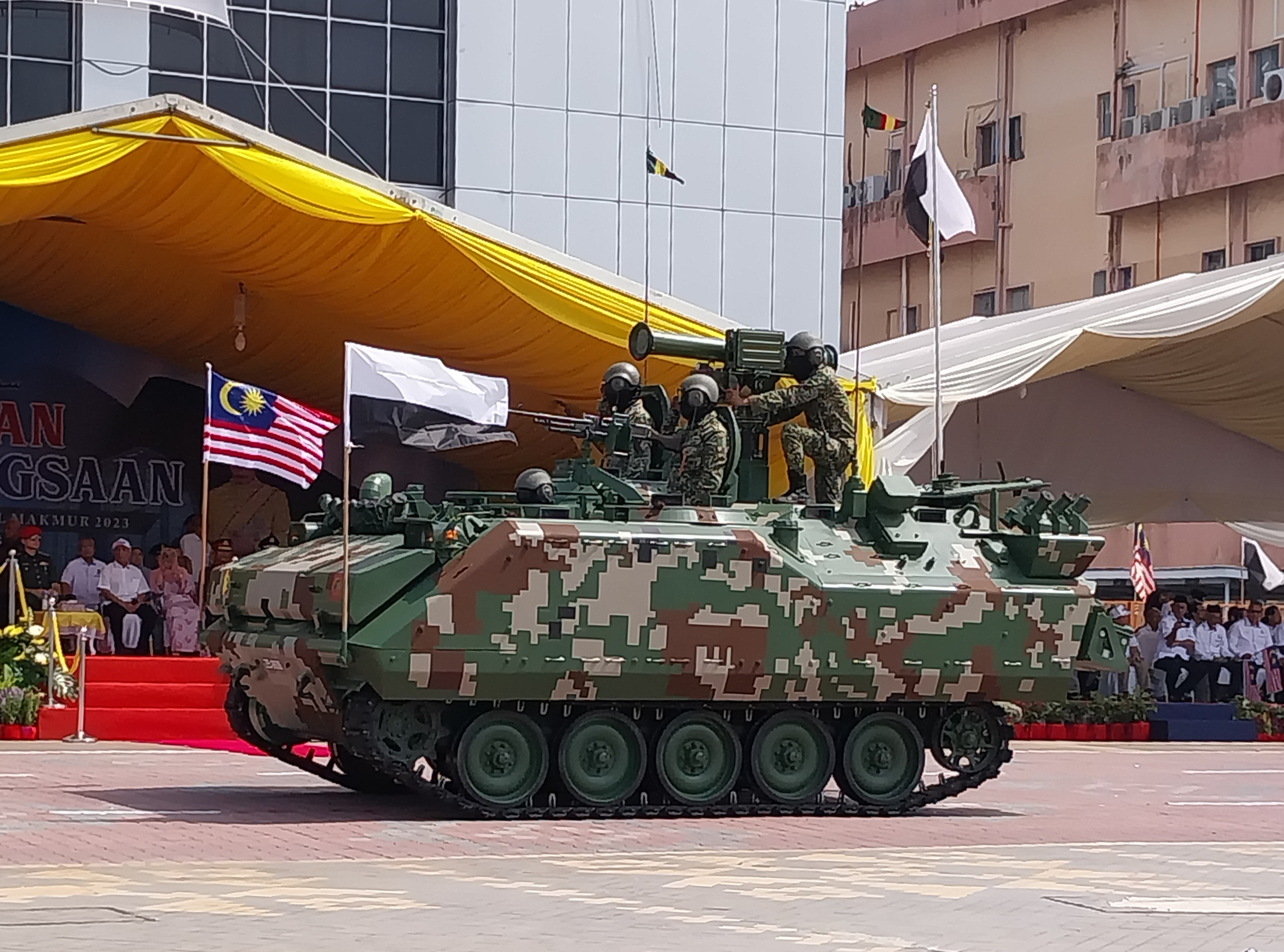
ACV-300 Adnan Baktar Shikan ATGM variant.

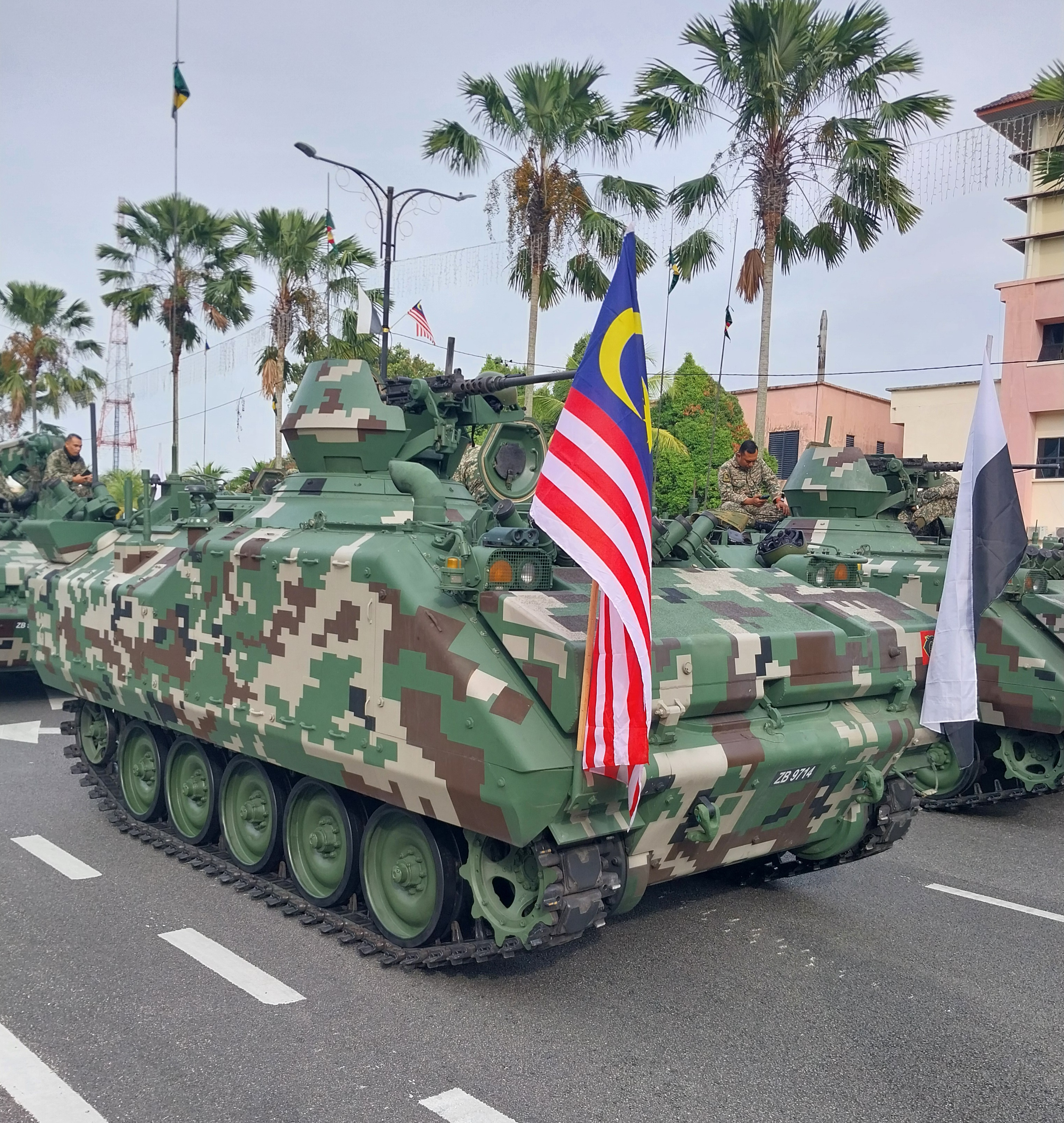
ACV-300 Adnan command vehicle variant.

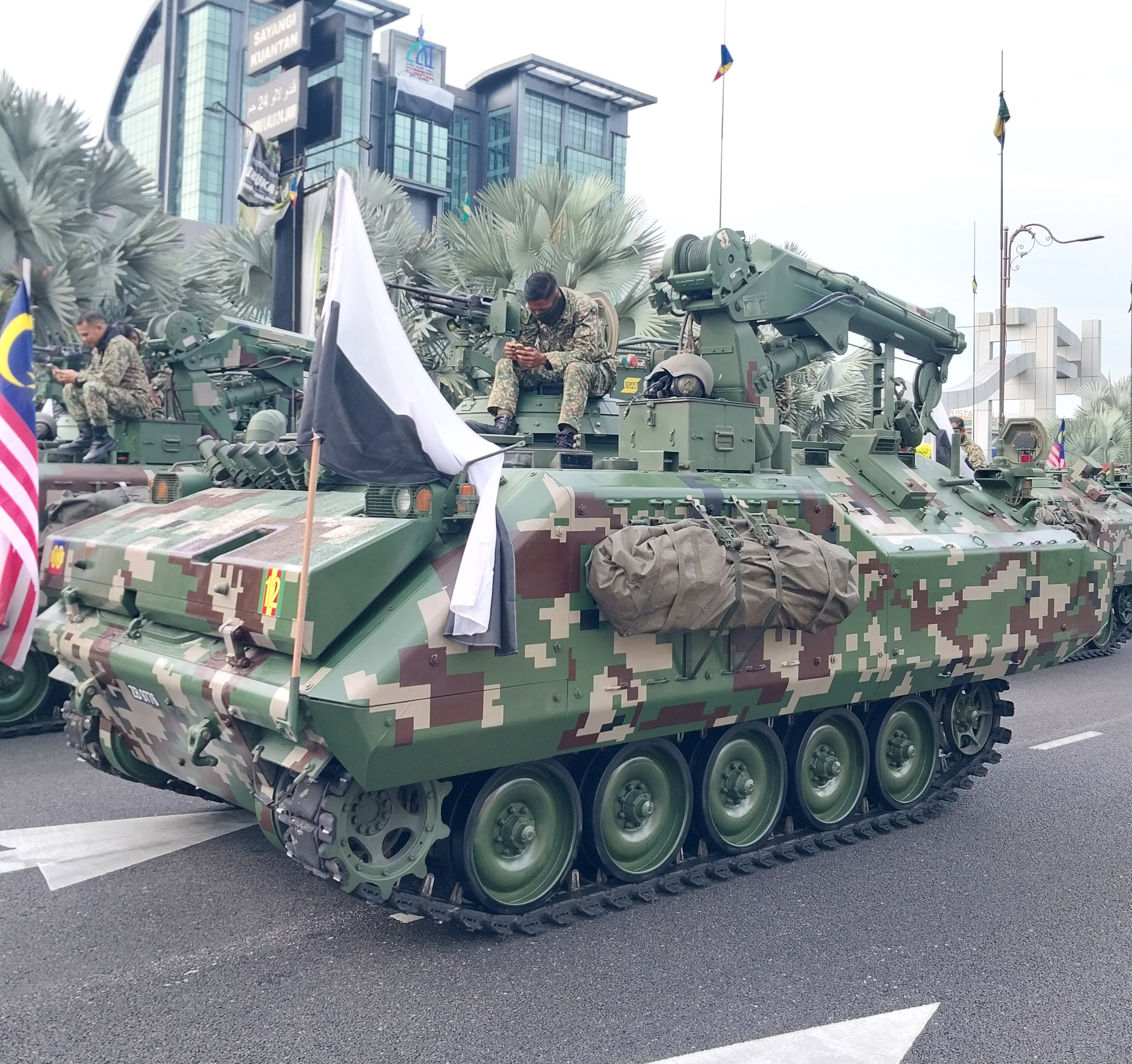
ACV-300 Adnan recovery vehicle variant.

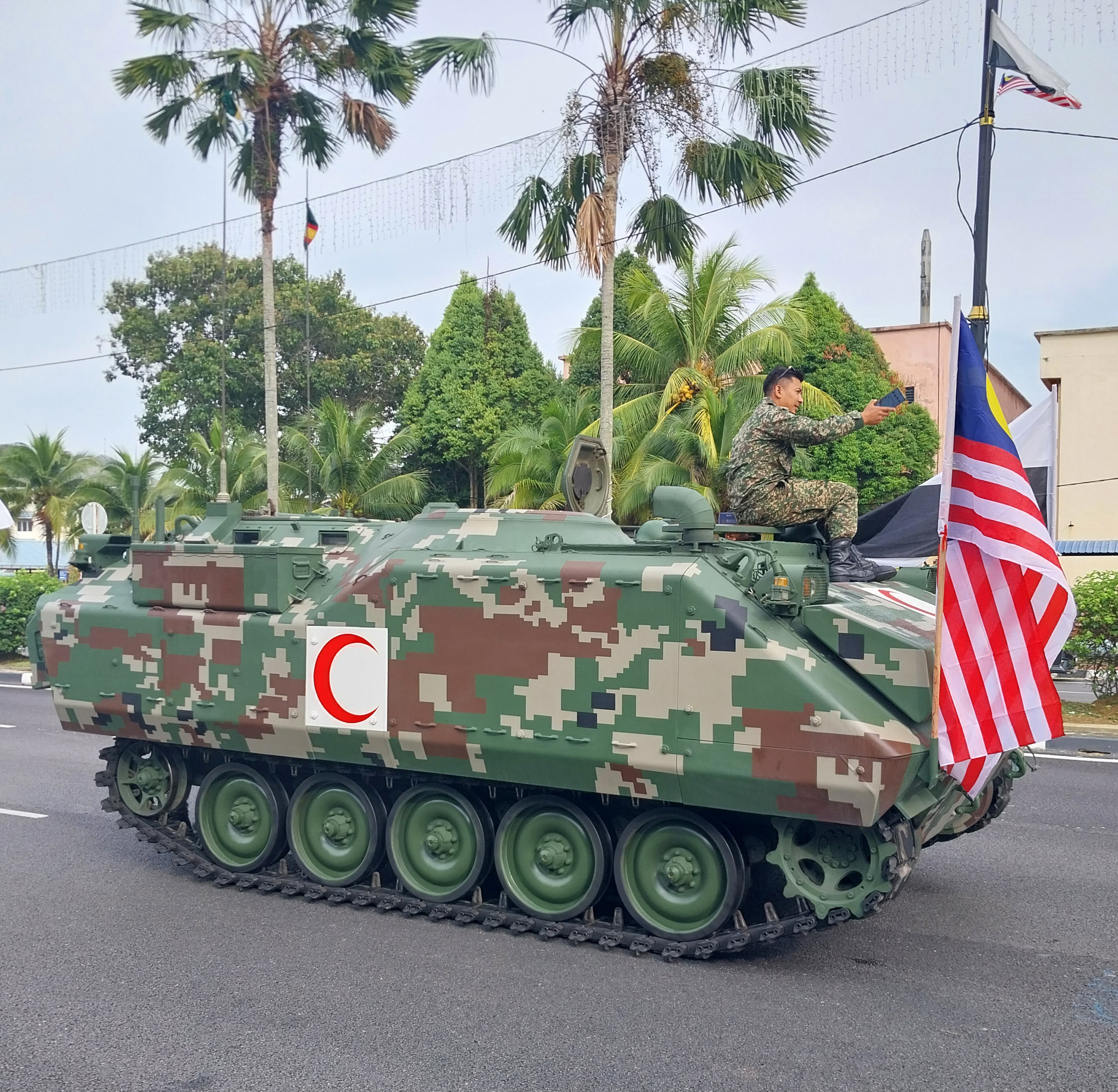
ACV-300 Adnan ambulance variant.

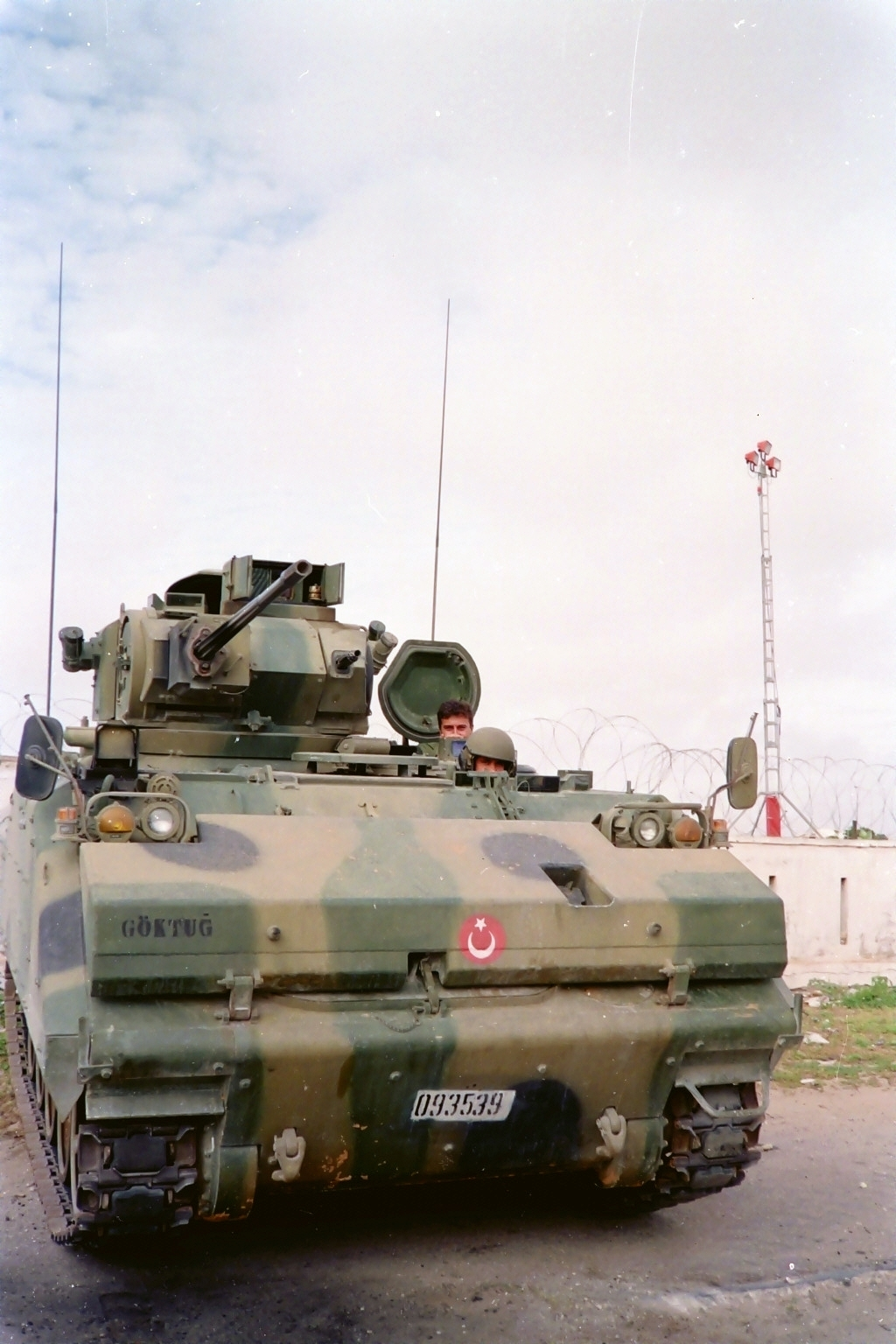
Turkish Land Forces ACV-15 in Somalia.

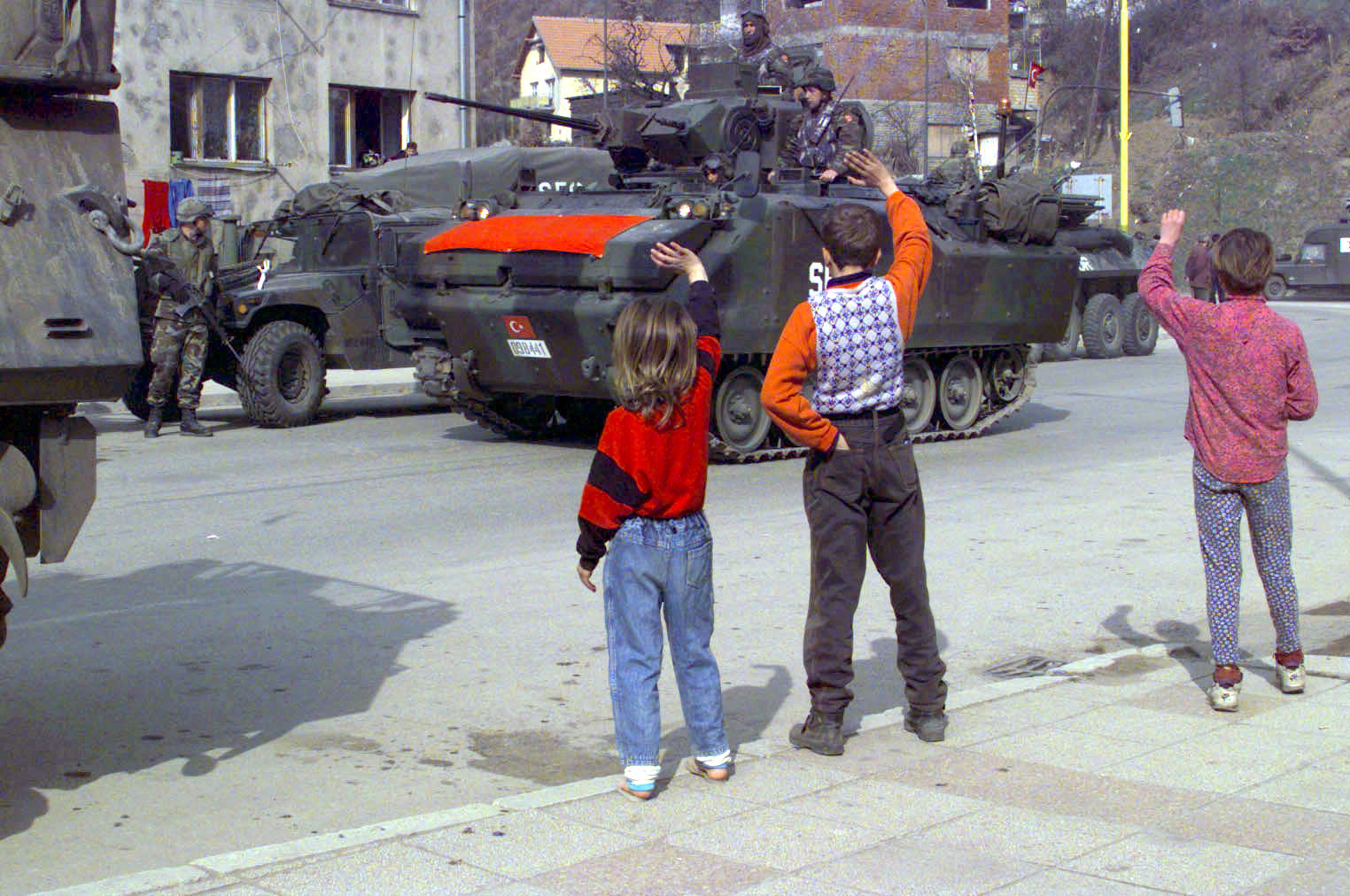
Turkish Land Forces ACV-15 in Bosnia.
