= DRB-HICOM Defence Technologies =

Malaysian defence organization

DRB-HICOM Defence Technologies Sdn Bhd
- Company type: Private Limited Company
- Industry: Automotive; Defence; Aerospace & UAV
- Founded: 17 October 1996; 29 years ago
- Headquarters: Shah Alam, Selangor, Malaysia
- Area served: South East Asia, East Africa
- Key people: Tan Sri Dato' Sri Haji Mohd Khamil bin Jamil (Chairman/Director)
- Parent: DRB-HICOM
- Website: www.deftech.com.my

DRB-HICOM Defence Technologies Sdn Bhd, officially known and doing business as DEFTECH, is a Malaysian defence contractor involved in the development, manufacture, supply, deliver and commissioning of armoured, non-armoured, and logistic vehicles for the military and homeland security. DEFTECH is also a supplier of specialised vehicles and commercial buses.

DEFTECH divisions includes DRB-HICOM Defence Technologies Sdn Bhd (DEFTECH), Defence Services Sdn Bhd (DSSB), DEFTECH Systems Integration (DSI), DEFTECH Unmanned Systems (DUS) and DEFTECH Aviation (DAV).

== History ==
On 17 October 1996, DEFTECH, a wholly owned subsidiary of DRB-HICOM was incorporated to contribute towards Malaysia's industrialisation and self-reliant defence aspirations.

In 2001, DEFTECH established its armoured vehicle production in Pekan, Pahang at a cost of RM70 million to prepare for the collaboration with FNSS of Turkey to manufacture and supply the ACV-300 Adnan family of vehicles to the Ministry of Defence. The successful partnership translated into additional order for the vehicles.

Between 2011 and 2014, DEFTECH spent 500 million ringgit to upgrade its infrastructure, equipment and manpower to prepare for the development and production of the AV8 Gempita.

In 2014, DEFTECH acquired Composites Technology Research Malaysia under a multi million worth contract.

== Divisions ==
=== Engineering Division and Corporate HQ ===
DEFTECH's corporate headquarters are located in a purpose-built office complex in Section 15 Shah Alam, Selangor. It is collocated in the same area as DEFTECH's Engineering Division.

In June 2004, DEFTECH established its Engineering Division.

=== DRB-HICOM Defence Technologies Sdn Bhd (DEFTECH) ===
The headquarters located at Shah Alam, Selangor while the assembly plant is located at Pekan, Pahang, in 2001 under ACV-300 Adnan manufacture program. The plant is situated on a 25.6-acre site and has a covered work area of approximately 180,000 sq feet. The plant is manufactures of all armoured vehicles and was upgraded in 2014 to prepare for the production of the AV8 Gempita.

=== Defence Services ===
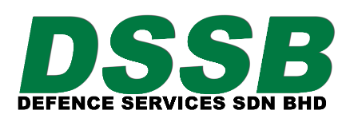
DSSB Nilai logo

DSSB is a fully owned subsidiary of DEFTECH and is located in Nilai Industrial Estate, Negeri Sembilan where it has a dedicated plant equipped to cater for the 3rd and 4th Line Maintenance of the Army's fleet of armoured vehicles. The workshop is responsible for producing the turrets for the AV8 Gempita.

=== DEFTECH Systems Integration ===
Formerly known as CTRM Systems Integration. Incorporated in 2010 to develop Malaysian integration capabilities. The main course of this division is to designing, developing and integrating the systems and provided engineering and repairing of electronic devices.

=== DEFTECH Unmanned Systems ===
Formerly known as Unmanned Systems Technology under CTRM. Incorporated in 2007 and offers a wide range of unmanned aerial vehicle products and services.

=== DEFTECH Aviation ===
DEFTECH Aviation focus on aerospace and composites technology for aircraft. This division also provides maintenance, repair and overhaul for the aircraft such as Malaysian Army AW109 helicopter, Royal Malaysia Police Cessna 208 fixed wing aircraft and other military and commercial aircraft.

== Products ==
Theres are some major products by DEFTECH. Others than civilian products such as machine, bus and truck, DEFTECH majorly focus on defence product especially in land system technology.

=== Military ===
==== DEFTECH ACV-300 Adnan ====
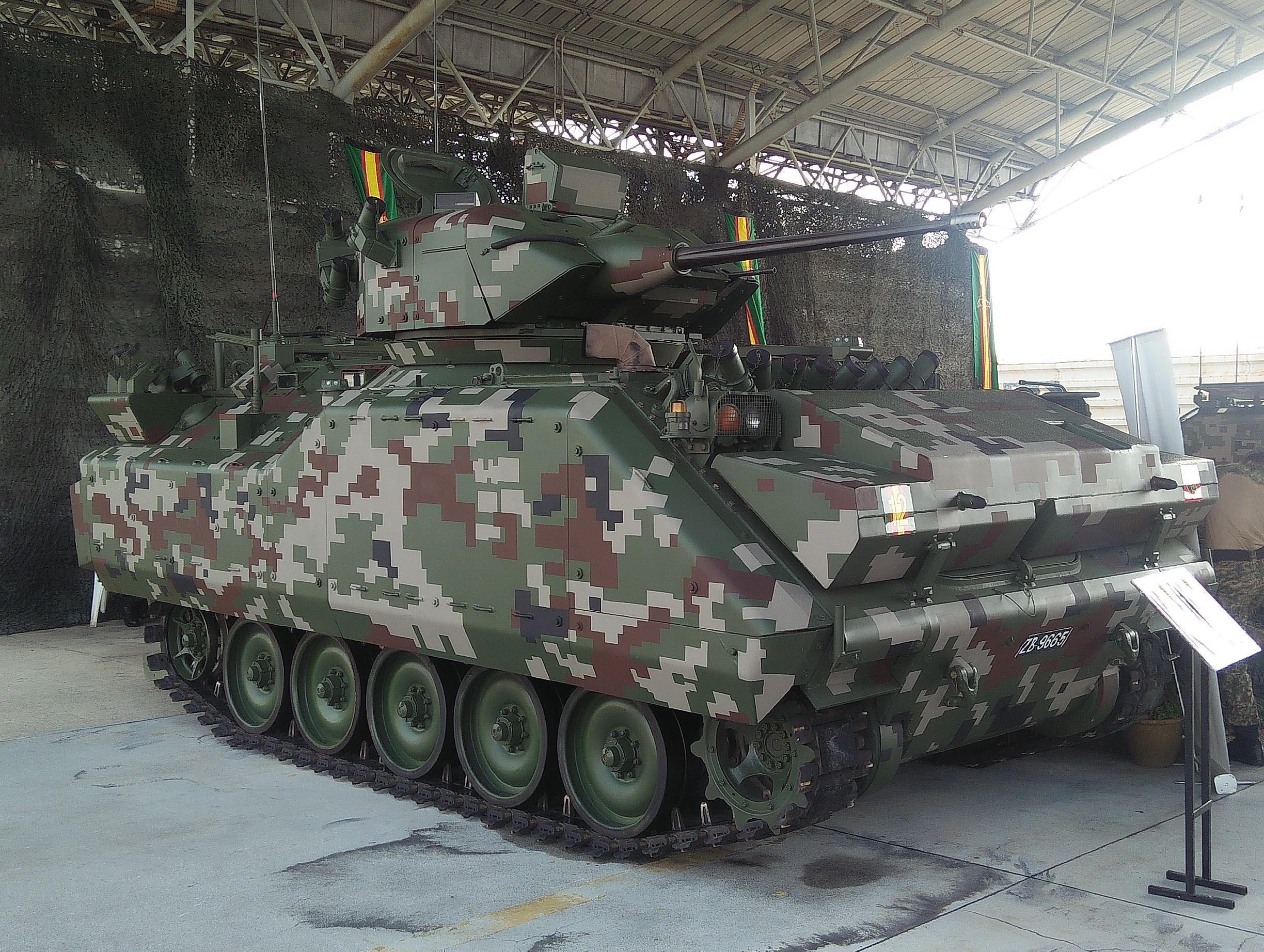
ACV-300 Adnan

In 2001, DEFTECH collaborated with FNSS to produce the ACV-300 Adnan for the Malaysian Army. DEFTECH was nominated by the government as the recipient of the Transfer of Technology package. On 21 April 2008, DEFTECH signed a contract with the Malaysian Ministry of Defence for the delivery of 48 additional units of ACV-300 Adnan and 8 units of ACV-S 120mm Mortar Carrier. A total of 267 units were produced by DEFTECH.

==== DEFTECH AV8 Gempita (8x8) ====
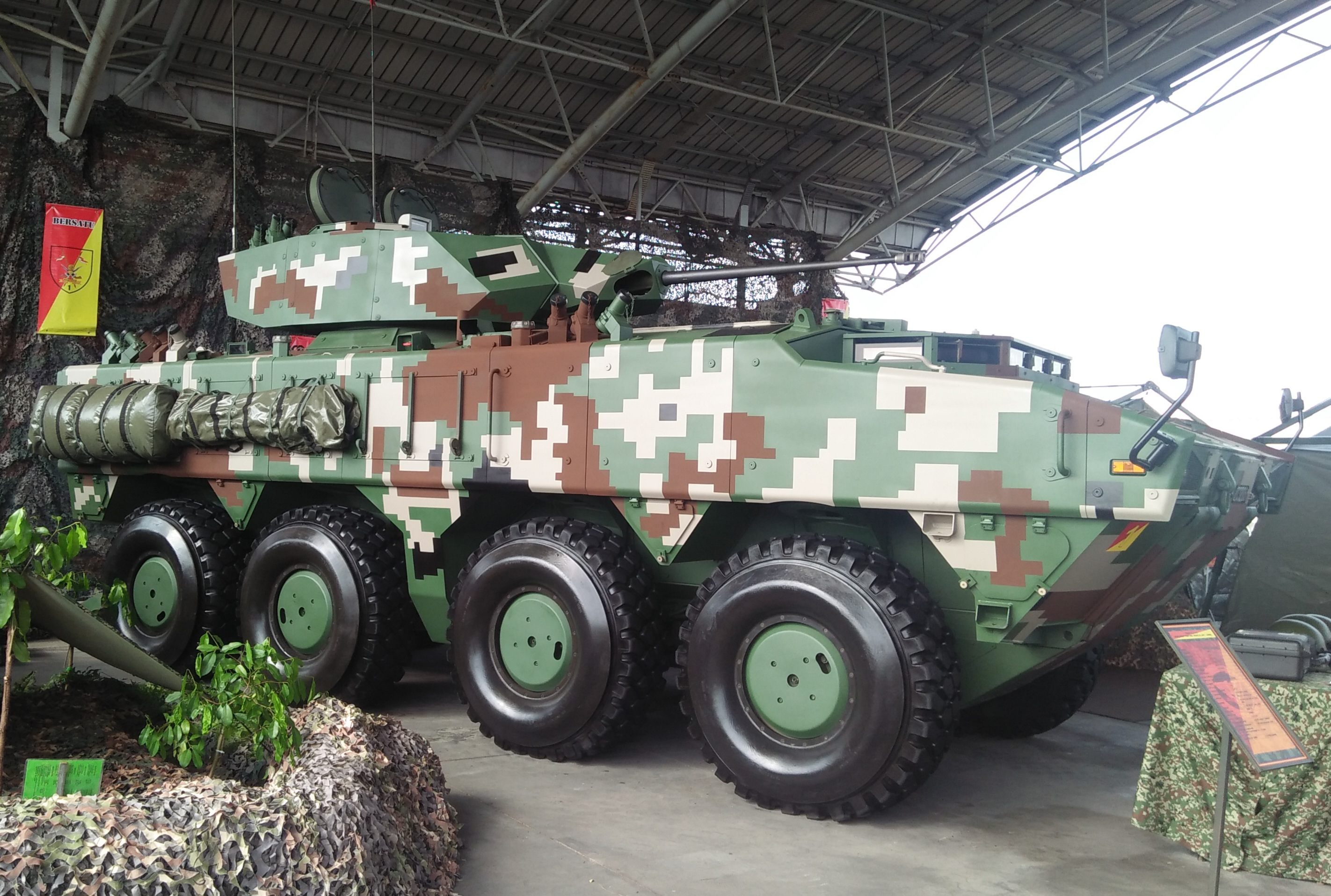
AV8 Gempita

In June 2011, the Turkish Company FNSS signed a 'letter of offer and acceptance' by DRB-Hicom Defence Technologies (DEFTECH) for the assistance of design and development of the vehicles. The AV8 vehicle selected by the Malaysian military was based on the FNSS-designed Pars 8×8 multi-purpose, multi-mission, wheeled armoured vehicle. The contract included technology transfer arrangements to Deftech and logistics support for the Malaysian army, positioning the vehicle and its 12 variants to become Malaysia's first indigenous family of 8×8 armoured wheeled vehicle. In December 2014, the AV8 was officially inducted into service with the Malaysian Army in a ceremony at the DEFTECH plant in Pekan. As of 2022, a total of 257 units in service.

==== DEFTECH AV4 Lipanbara (4x4) ====
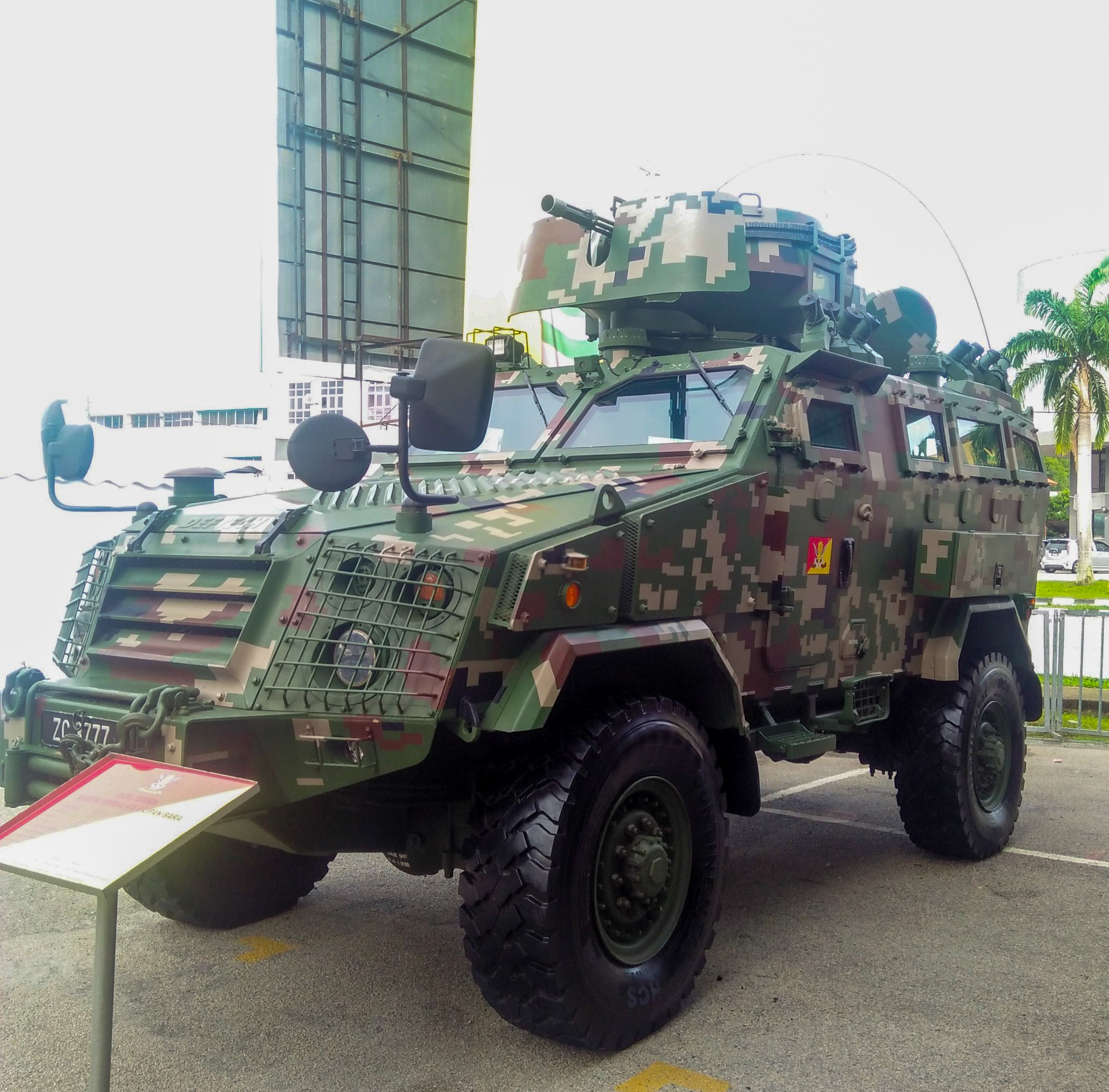
AV4 Lipanbara

In July 2015, DRB-HICOM Defence Technologies Sdn Bhd (DEFTECH) was awarded a contract worth above RM100 million to supply the 4x4 High Mobility Armoured Vehicle (HMAV) to the Malaysian Armed Forces. This program involves the collaboration of Thailand’s Chaiseri Metal and Rubber Co Ltd for the designing of the 4x4 indigenous armoured vehicles customised to Malaysian infantry standard based on Chaiseri First Win.

==== DEFTECH AV4 (4x4) ====
As Malaysia's sole armoured vehicle manufacturing company at that time, DEFTECH was involved in the development of the first generation of AV4 based on South African-designed RG-34 MRAPs (formerly known as Iguana FV4). One prototype was unveiled in 2006 but the procurement program of about 200 vehicles was cancelled.

==== DEFTECH LTV (4x4) ====
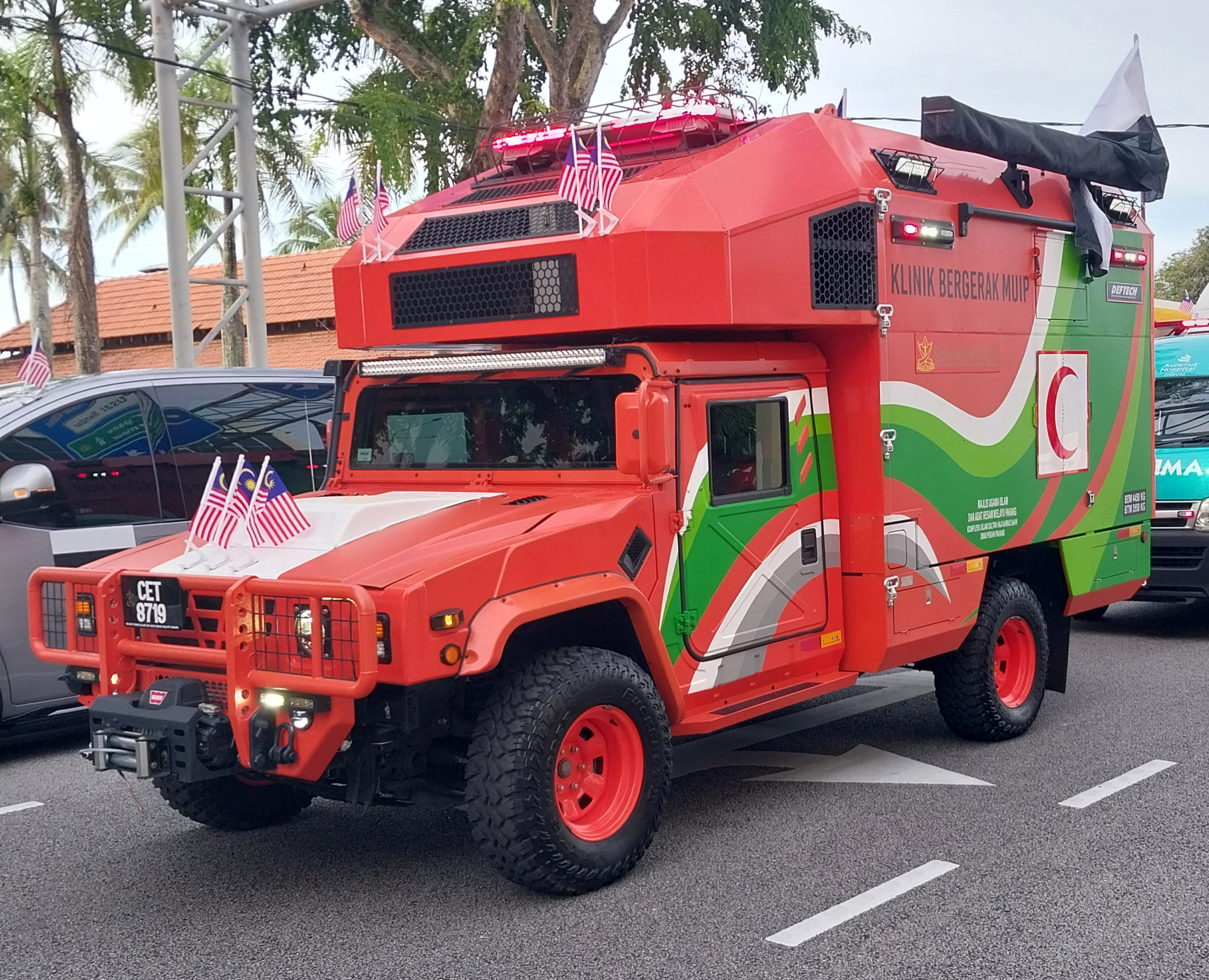
LTV in ambulance configuration

In 2021, DEFTECH launched its first 4x4 light tactical vehicle. This Humvee-like vehicle consisted of various configuration for the various mission. One of the notable version of the DefTech LTV is the 4x4 ambulance that planned to be uses by Malaysia Civil Defence Force and other health agencies of Malaysia.

==== HICOM Handalan Truck (4x4) ====
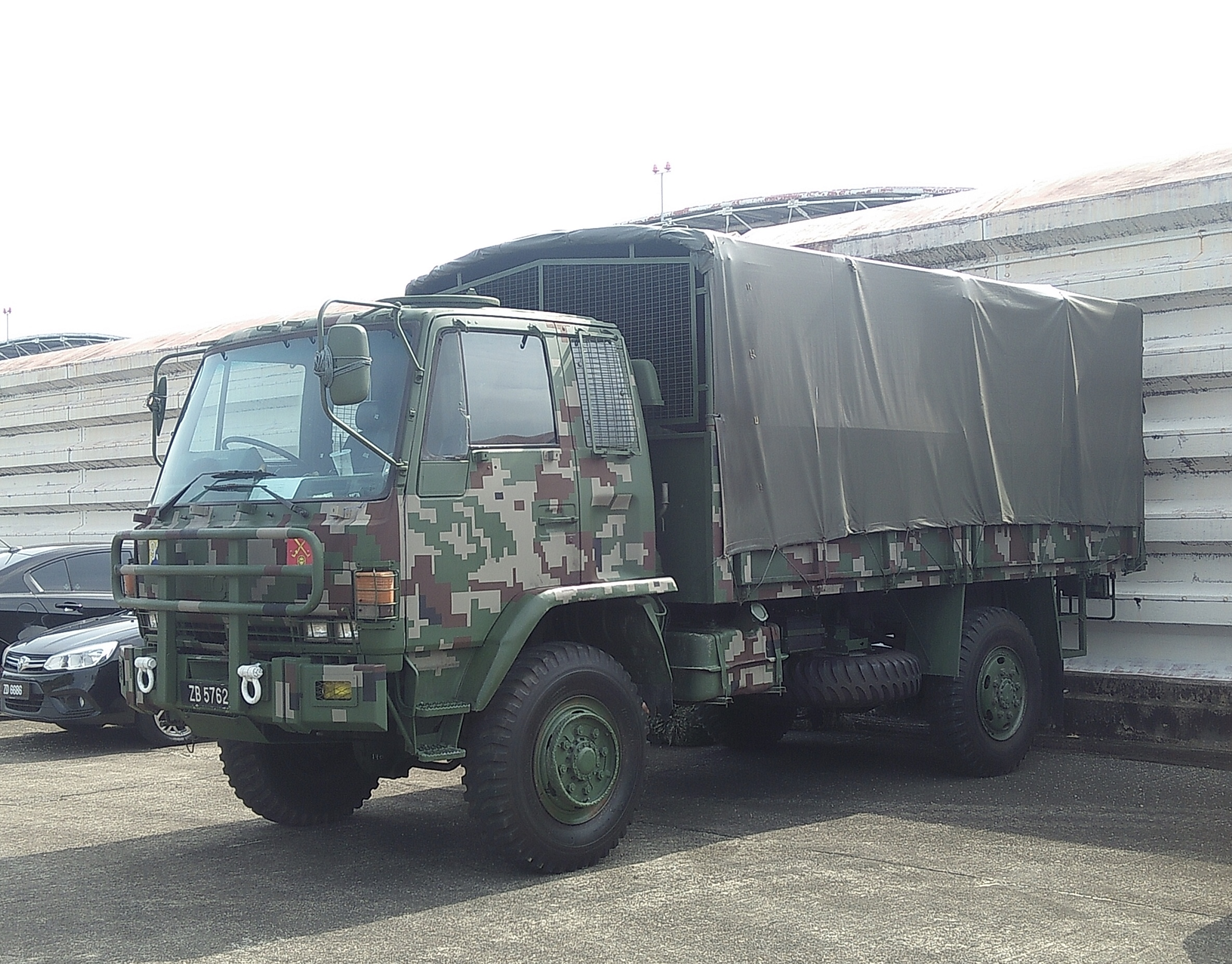
Handalan truck uses by Malaysian Army

The HICOM Handalan trucks are multi-purpose logistics trucks made by DEFTECH for military purposes. The truck is one of DEFTECH's most produced designs, with 2,260 units produced for the Ministry of Defence across two variants, as well as 115 units for the Royal Brunei Armed Forces and 6 units for the Royal Australian Air Force.

==== DEFTECH GS Cargo ====
Based on 4x4 pickup.

==== DEFTECH Light Recovery Vehicle (4x4) ====
Based on Isuzu FTS 33H chassis and powered by a 250 hp engines.

==== DEFTECH Armoured Heavy Recovery Vehicle (AHRV) (8x8) ====
At Defense Service Asia (DSA) 2024, DEFTECH revealed its Armoured Heavy Recovery Vehicle (AHRV) based on Volvo chassis. This 8x8 vehicle are armoured and powered by a 520 hp Volvo D13A520 engine. AHRV also equipped with bulldozer blade in front of the vehicle, heavy recovery crane and winch. For the armament the vehicle is equipped with a 7.62 mm machine gun.

==== Aludra UAV ====
On March 28, 2022, DEFTECH unveiled a new UAV at the DSA 2022 convention under the brand name Aludra EE.

=== Civilian ===
In 2010, DEFTECH won a contract to deliver 150 buses to Prasarana, Malaysia's public transport operator.
