= Critical Test Results Management =

Critical Test Results Management (CTRM) also known as Critical Test Results Reporting, and Closed-Loop Reporting, is the software that handles a medical test result that has come back as critical to a patient’s health. CTRM software prevents the critical result from being lost in communication failures, improves patient safety, and documents the delivery of the results.

== History ==
The Patient Safety and Quality Improvement Act of 2005 was passed into law in response to growing concerns about patient safety in the United States. The goal of the act was to improve patient safety by encouraging hospitals and their staff to voluntarily report events that adversely affected patients.

The Joint Commission on Accreditation of Healthcare Organizations is a non-profit organization that gives accreditation to hospitals that meet the standards in The Joint Commission’s National Patient Safety Goals. The Joint Commission Goal 2 states that "ineffective communication is the most frequently cited root cause for sentinel events," and requires that hospitals "implement a standardized approach to hand-off communications, including an opportunity to ask and respond to questions". Software has been developed to help hospitals achieve accreditation through The Joint Commission, while saving hospitals and other medical organizations from communication errors that could result in patient injury or death, and lawsuits against the caregiver.

== How It Works ==
When a radiologist, pathologist, interpreting clinician, diagnostician, or emergency department or laboratory personnel flag a study as a critical finding, this critical information is sent immediately to a healthcare professional (such as surgeons, physicians, nurses, etc.) via secure SMS text, secure email, pager, or voice. This information can include images, reports, annotations, voice clips, handwritten notes, and other critical information. When the recipient opens the message a receipt confirmation is automatically sent to the sender and recorded in the software, thereby eliminating the need to check if the message was received. Automated monitoring and escalation of undelivered findings ensure a timely receipt of the message. Audit trails and automatic report generation ensure that hospital administration has a way to document and check that results have gotten to an appropriate caregiver in the amount of time specified by an individual hospital.

== Providers ==
A small number of companies have developed products in critical test results management. Currently only IMCO-STAT, an IMCO Technologies product, has been FDA cleared for Device Regulatory Class II (Special Controls).

== See also ==
- Patient safety
- Joint Commission
- Health Informatics
- Management systems
