= Composites Technology Research Malaysia =

Malaysian aerospace/composite company

Composites Technology Research Malaysia Sdn Bhd
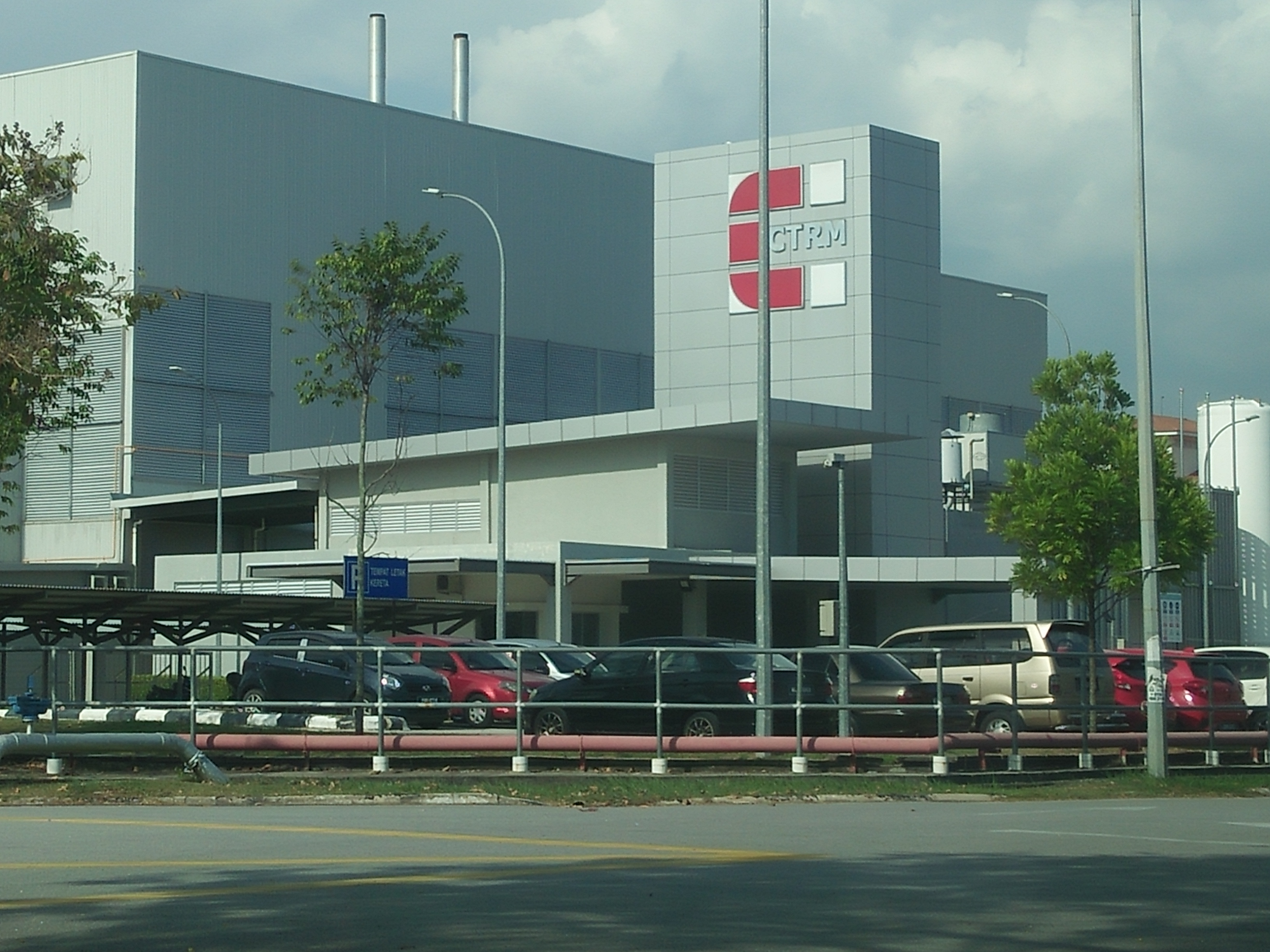
- Company type: Private Limited Company
- Industry: Aerospace; Defence
- Founded: 20 November 1990; 35 years ago
- Headquarters: Shah Alam, Selangor, Malaysia
- Products: UAV, composites aerostructure, satcom antenna, radome
- Parent: DEFTECH

Composites Technology Research Malaysia Sdn Bhd (CTRM) is a Malaysian high technology based industrial company involved in the aerospace and composites industries. The company's main products includes UAV, composites aerostructure, satcom antenna and radome. The company consists of CTRM Aero Composites, CTRM Composites Engineering, Composites Testing Laboratory, CTRM Aviation, CTRM Systems Integration and Unmanned Systems Technology.

The company is now fully owned by DEFTECH.

== History ==
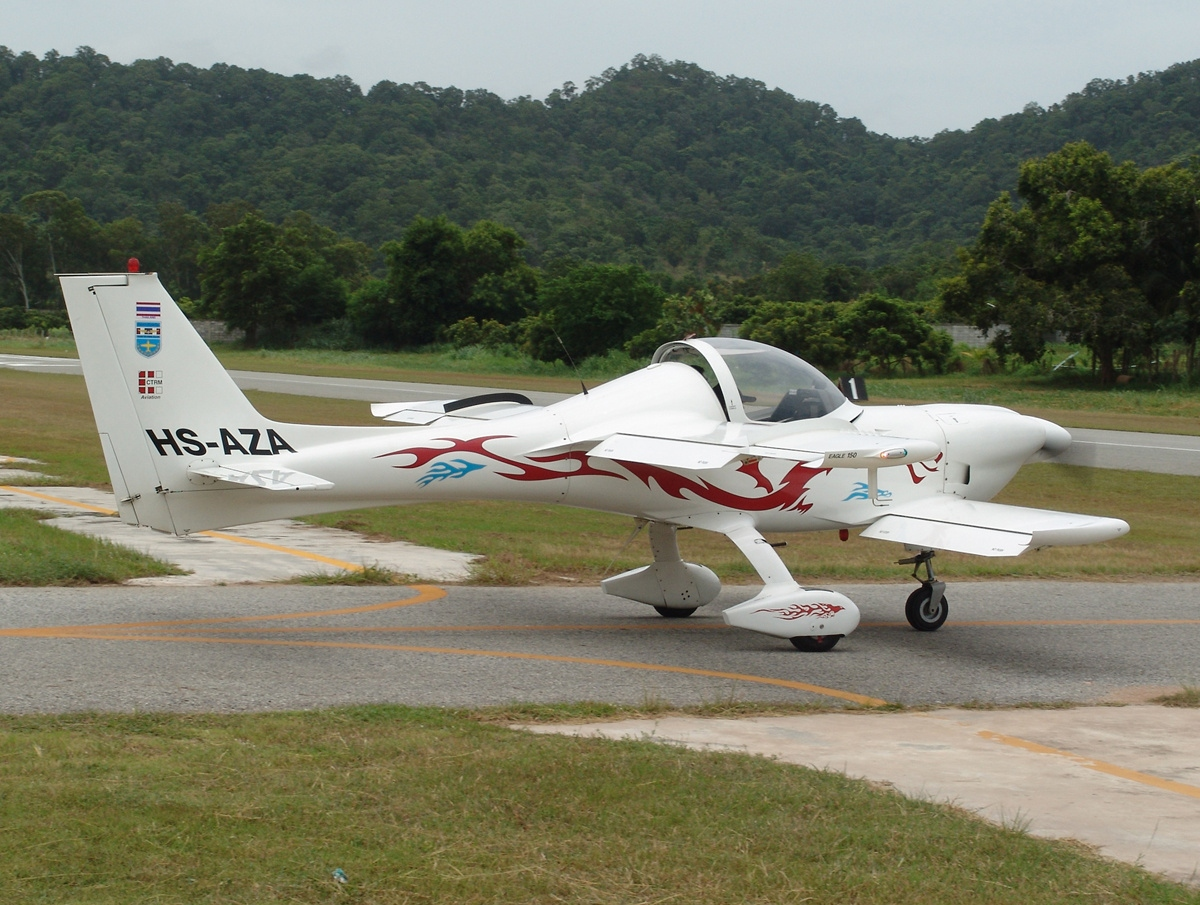
CTRM Eagle 150 is one of the CTRM's products

The company is located in Batu Berendam, Malacca and it was incorporated on 20 November 1990 by Ministry of finance to be one of the recognized aerospace and composite hubs in the region. One of the early achievements of the company is locally manufactured the Eagle Aircraft Eagle 150. The company is also recognized as a pioneer in the development and manufacturing of the local Unmanned Aerial Vehicle (UAV) with its Aludra UAV. Other than that, CTRM also produced composites component for the aircraft.

CTRM is part of the global supply chain in composites aerostructures for major commercial and military aircraft manufacturers in the world. This included the aircraft composites parts for the Airbus A320, Airbus A350, Airbus A380 and Airbus A400. The company also responsible for the construction of the radome for the Malaysian authorities including Royal Malaysian Air Force.

== DEFTECH's acquisition ==
In 2014, DEFTECH acquired CTRM and all its subsidiaries under a multi million worth contract. This will made all the CTRM's products will using the DEFTECH badge. Under this acquisition, there will be three division which is:

=== DEFTECH Systems Integration ===
Formerly known as CTRM Systems Integration. Incorporated in 2010 to develop Malaysian integration capabilities. The main course of this division is to designing, developing and integrating the systems and provided engineering and repairing of electronic devices.

=== DEFTECH Unmanned Systems ===
Formerly known as Unmanned Systems Technology under CTRM. Incorporated in 2007 and offers a wide range of UAV products and services.

=== DEFTECH Aviation ===
Formerly known as CTRM. Focus on aerospace and composites technology for aircraft.

== Products ==
- Aludra UAV
- Eagle 150 aircraft
- Composites parts for the Airbus A320, Airbus A350, Airbus A380 and Airbus A400
- Radome
