= Eagle Aircraft Eagle 150 =

Australian single-engine aircraft

Eagle 150
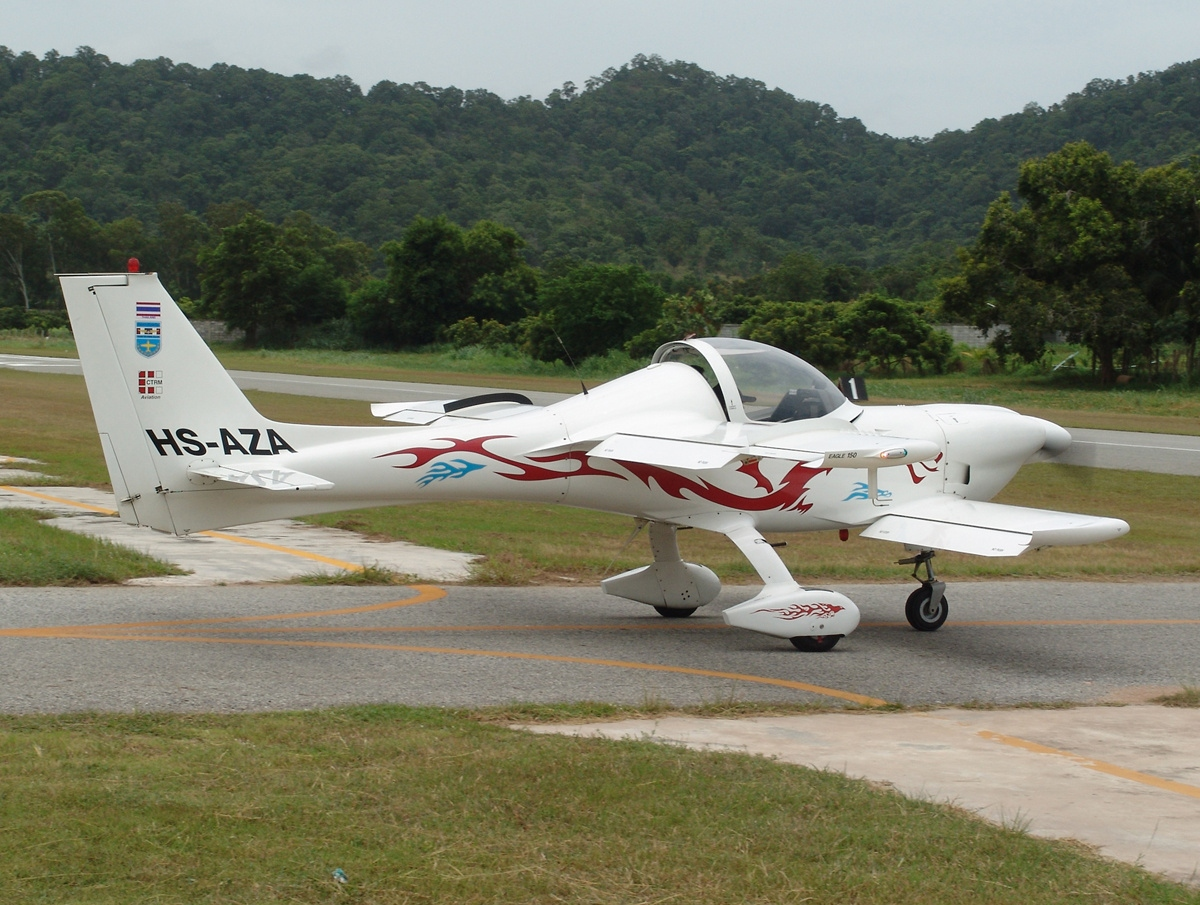
- Eagle 150B

General information
- Type: Light aircraft
- Manufacturer: Eagle Aircraft Pty Ltd Composites Technology Research Malaysia (CTRM)
- Designer: John Roncz
- Status: In service with Royal Malaysian Air Force

History
- Introduction date: 1998
- First flight: 1997
- Developed from: Eagle Aircraft X-TS

The Eagle Aircraft 150 is an Australian designed two-seat single-engine composite material training, touring and sport aircraft. It utilizes a three lifting surface design consisting of a forward wing (foreplane), main wing (mainplane) and horizontal stabilizer (tailplane). The aircraft was designed and originally built by Eagle Aircraft Pty Ltd, but is now manufactured in Malaysia by Composites Technology Research Malaysia (CTRM).

== Design and development ==
The Eagle 150B is a development of the Eagle Aircraft X-TS from Western Australian inventors Neil Graham and his father Deryck Graham. Australian aeronautical engineer Graham Swannell and American aerodynamicist John Roncz were then engaged to design an aircraft to meet then-current JAR VLA requirements and demonstrate minimal stall characteristics. The resulting prototype (designated Eagle 150A) was first flown in March 1988, and was certified in November 1996. The aircraft demonstrated docile stall characteristics, rapid roll rates, 125 knot cruise speed (at 75% power) and crisp handling. After 15 aircraft were built at Fremantle, Western Australia, the Eagle 150B was introduced. Roncz was presented with the Prince's Australian Medal for the design of the Eagle 150 by His Royal Highness Prince Philip at a London ceremony in 2000.

The manufacturing rights to the Eagle 150B are now owned by the Malaysian company Composites Technology Research Malaysia (CTRM).

== Eagle Airborne Reconnaissance Vehicle ==
A development of the aircraft as an unmanned aerial vehicle has been designated the Eagle ARV System. The first system, consisting of three aircraft and a ground station, has been purchased by the Malaysian government and other 20 on order.

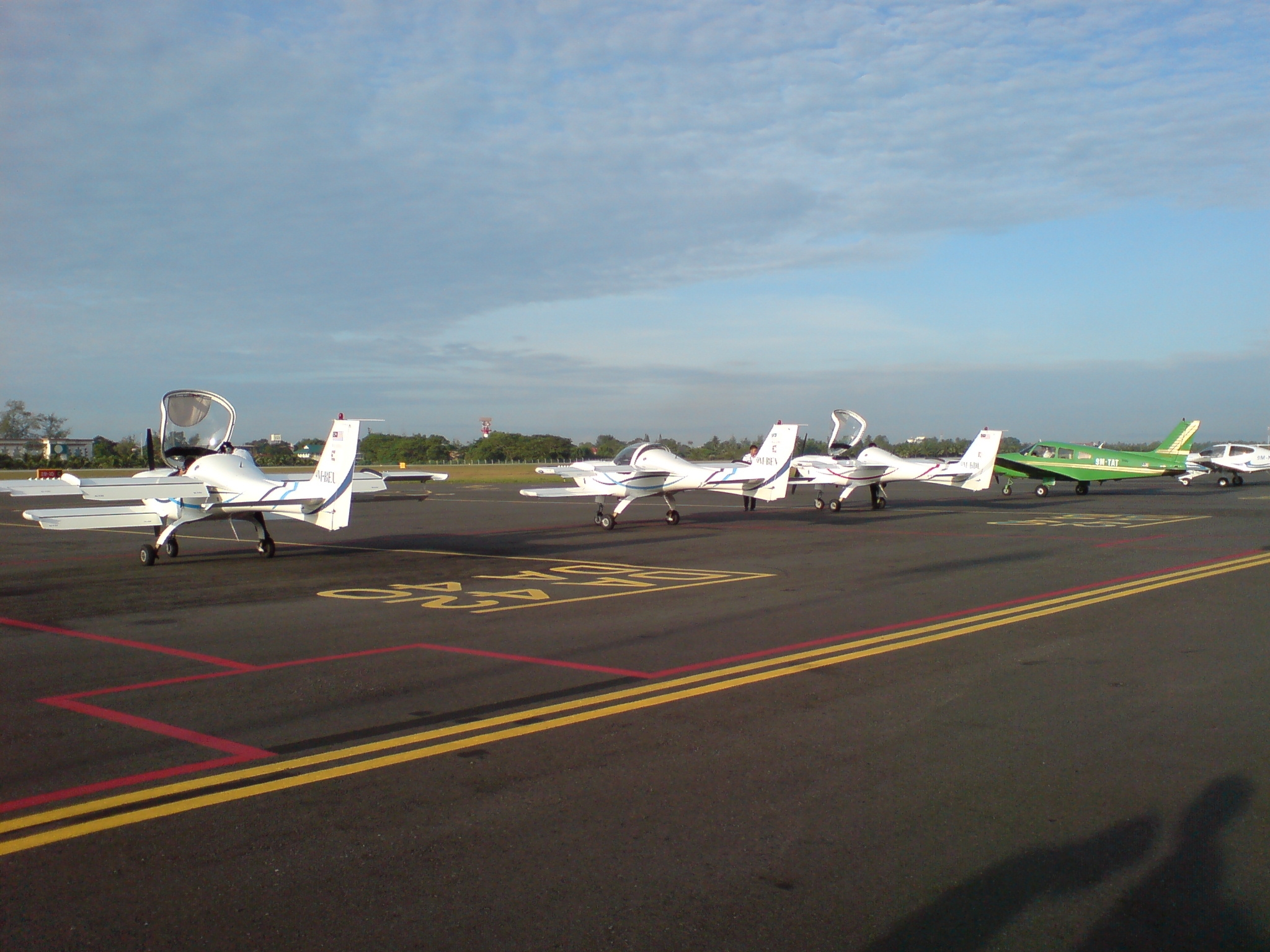
APFT Eagle and Piper fleet of Asia Pacific Flight Training on apron

The unmanned or manned version of 150 is being used by the Royal Malaysian Air Force for aerial surveillance operations for environmental and fire control. Specifications are identical to the Eagle 150 other than the ability for the aircraft to be remotely flown.

== Variants ==
Eagle 150
Productionised version of the XT-S, built by Eagle Aircraft.
Eagle 150B
Further development of the 150
CTRM Eagle ARV
Optionally piloted UAV version of the 150B developed by Eagle Aircraft Pty Ltd/BAE Systems/Composites Technology Research Malaysia (CTRM) for the Malaysian Government.

== Specifications (E-150B) ==
Data from Jane's all the World's Aircraft 2000–01 Eagle 150B Pilots Operating Handbook and FAA Approved Airplane Flight Manual

General characteristics

- Crew: 1
- Capacity: 2
- Length: 6.45 m (21 ft 2 in)
- Wingspan: 7.16 m (23 ft 6 in)
- Foreplane span: 4.88 m (16.01 ft)
- Height: 2.31 m (7 ft 7 in)
- Wing area: 5.2 m^{2} (56 sq ft)
- Foreplane area: 3.62 m^{2} (39.0 sq ft)
- Aspect ratio: 9.9
- Airfoil: Roncz 16%
- Empty weight: 430 kg (948 lb)
- Max takeoff weight: 650 kg (1,433 lb)
- Fuel capacity: 97 L (26 US gal; 21 imp gal) usable
- Powerplant: 1 × Teledyne Continental Motors IO-240-A or IO-240-B7B 4-cylinder air-cooled horizontally-opposed piston engine, 93 kW (125 hp)
- Propellers: 2-bladed MacCauley IA135BRM7054 or IA135CRM7057 or 1A135DRM7057, 1.78 m (5 ft 10 in) diameter fixed-pitch metal propeller

Performance

- Maximum speed: 241 km/h (150 mph, 130 kn)
- Cruise speed: 222 km/h (138 mph, 120 kn) at 75% power
- Stall speed: 102 km/h (63 mph, 55 kn) flaps up at sea level

84 km/h (52 mph; 45 kn) flaps down at sea level

- Range: 1,000 km (620 mi, 540 nmi) at 75% power
- Endurance: 5 hours at 60% power
- Service ceiling: 4,575 m (15,010 ft)
- g limits: JAR-VLA: +3.8 -1.9; Ultimate: +8.55 -4.27
- Rate of climb: 5.3 m/s (1,040 ft/min)
- Wing loading: 73.6 kg/m^{2} (15.1 lb/sq ft) mainplane and foreplane
- Power/mass: 0.1433 kW/kg (0.0872 hp/lb)
- Take-off run to 15 m (49 ft): 349 m (1,145 ft)
- Landing run from 15 m (49 ft): 365 m (1,198 ft)

Avionics
including

- Honeywell KY 97A VHF radio
- Honeywell KT 97A Transponder
- Garmin GNS250XL GPS
