= List of corvette classes =

List of corvette classes by country during the modern era (post 1940); (see also List of frigate classes and List of frigate classes by country)

== Algeria ( Algerian Navy) ==
- Nanuchka class

== Argentina (Argentine Navy) ==
- Espora class
- Drummond class (French-built D'Estienne d'Orves class)
- Murature class

== Australia (Royal Australian Navy) ==
- Bathurst class

== Brazil (Brazilian Navy) ==
- Inhaúma class
- Barroso class

== Brunei (Royal Brunei Navy) ==
- F2000 class (transferred to Indonesian Navy)

== Canada ( Royal Canadian Navy) ==
- Flower class
- Castle class

== China (People's Liberation Army Navy) ==
- Type 056

== Denmark (Royal Danish Navy) ==
- Niels Juel class
- Triton class (Albatros class)
- HDMS Thetis (ex British Flower class)

== Ecuador (Ecuadorian Navy) ==
- Esmeraldas class

== Egypt (Egyptian Navy) ==
- El Suez class (former Descubierta class)
- El Fateh class (Gowind 2500 class)

== Finland (Finnish Navy) ==
- Turunmaa class
- Pohjanmaa class (in development)

== France (French Navy) ==
- D'Estienne d'Orves class (French rate them as avisos)

== Germany (German Navy) ==
- Braunschweig class

== India (Indian Navy) ==
- Veer class
- Abhay class
- Khukri class
- Kora class
- Kamorta class

== Indonesia (Indonesian Navy) ==
- Bathurst class
- Pattimura class
- Fatahillah class
- Dewantara class
- Kapitan Pattimura class
- Bung Tomo class
- Diponegoro class
- Bung Karno class

== Iraq (Iraqi Navy) ==
- Assad class

== Iran (Islamic Republic of Iran Navy/Islamic Revolutionary Guard Corps Navy) ==
- Bayandor class
- Shahid Soleimani corvettes

== Israel (Israeli Navy) ==
- Sa'ar 5 class
- Sa'ar 6 class

== Italy (Marina Militare) ==
=== Regia Marina ===
- Gabbiano class

=== Marina Militare ===
  - Albatros class
  - Pietro De Cristofaro class
  - Minerva class
  - Cassiopea class
  - Comandanti class

== Korea, South (Republic of Korea Navy) ==
- Donghae class
- Pohang class

== Libya (Libyan Navy) ==
- Nanuchka class
- Assad class
- Assad class

== Malaysia (Royal Malaysian Navy) ==
- Kasturi class
- Laksamana class

== Mexico (Mexican Navy) ==
- Durango class
- Holzinger class
- Oaxaca class
- Sierra class
- Uribe class

== Morocco (Moroccan Navy) ==
- Lt. Col. Errhamani class (Descubierta class)

== Myanmar (Myanmar Navy) ==
- Nawarat class
- Anawrahta class

== Norway (Royal Norwegian Navy) ==
- Flower class
- Sleipner class
- Skjold class
- Vanguard class - proposed

== Pakistan (Pakistan Navy) ==
- Babur class

== Peru (Peruvian Navy) ==
- Velarde (PR-72P) class

== Poland (Polish Navy) ==
- Gawron class
- Kaszub class
- Tarantul class

== Portugal (Portuguese Navy) ==
- João Coutinho class
- Baptista de Andrade class

== Philippines (Philippine Navy) ==
- Jacinto class
- Rizal class
- Miguel Malvar class
- Pohang class

== Romania (Romanian Naval Forces) ==
- Admiral Petre Bărbuneanu class
- Rear-Admiral Eustațiu Sebastian class
- Tarantul class

== Russia / Soviet Union (Russian Navy) ==
- Poti class
- Pauk class
- Parchim class
- Nanuchka class
- Grisha class
- Tarantul class
- Steregushchiy class
- Buyan class
- Karakurt class
- Gremyashchiy class

== Saudi Arabia (Royal Saudi Navy) ==
- Badr class
- Al Sadiq class

== Singapore (Republic of Singapore Navy) ==
- Victory class

== Spain (Spanish Navy) ==
- Atrevida class
- Descubierta class

== Sweden (Swedish Navy) ==
- Göteborg class
- Stockholm class
- Visby class

== Taiwan (Republic of China Navy) ==
- Cheng Kung class
- Chi Yang class
- Kang Ding class

== Thailand (Royal Thai Navy) ==
- Ratanakosin class
- Khamronsin class

== Turkey (Turkish Navy) ==
- Ada class
- Kılıç class
- Burak class (ex-French D'Estienne d'Orves class)

== United Arab Emirates (United Arab Emirates Navy) ==
- Baynunah class
- Muray-Jib class

== United Kingdom (Royal Navy) ==
- Flower class
- Castle class

== Vietnam ( Vietnamese People's Navy) ==
- Molniya class

== See also ==
- List of corvette and sloop classes of the Royal Navy
