= ARM Guanajuato =

ARM Guanajuato is the name of the following ships of the Mexican Navy, named for Guanajuato:

- ARM Guanajuato (C-07), a gunboat in service 1936–2001, museum ship from 2007 until scapping in 2023
- ARM Guanajuato (PO-153), a Durango-class patrol vessel in commission since 2001

== See also ==
- Guanajuato (disambiguation)
