= ARM Durango (PO-151) =

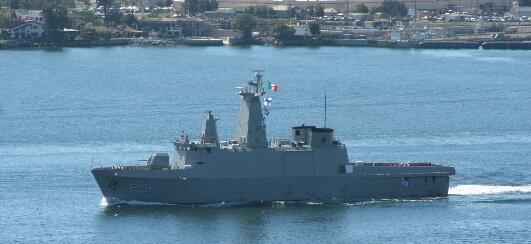
- ARM Durango

History

Mexico
- Name: ARM Durango
- Builder: Mexican Navy Ship yards
- Laid down: 18 December 1999
- Launched: 11 September 2000
- Commissioned: 11 September 2000
- Status: In active service

General characteristics
- Class & type: Durango-class patrol vessel
- Displacement: 1,300 long tons (1,300 t) standard; 1,470 long tons (1,490 t) full load
- Length: 81.4 m (267 ft 1 in)
- Beam: 10.5 m (34 ft 5 in)
- Draft: 3.9 m (12 ft 10 in)
- Propulsion: 2 x Caterpillar 3616 diesel engines; 6,197 hp (4,621 kW); 2 shafts
- Speed: 20 knots (37 km/h; 23 mph)
- Complement: 74
- Sensors & processing systems: Saab EOS 450 optronic director; Surface and air search radar
- Armament: Bofors 57 mm/70 caliber gun Mk 3
- Aircraft carried: 1 medium helicopter
- Aviation facilities: One helicopter hangar

ARM Durango (PO-151) is the first of four Durango-class patrol vessels in the Mexican Navy. Like other ships of this class, it was designed and built in Mexican dockyards. The ship is armed with a main 57 mm (2.2 in) gun turret and a helicopter landing pad. The vessel is primarily used for interdiction of drug smuggling. Launched and commissioned on 11 September 2000, Durango is currently in service.

== Description ==
The Durango-class design is based on the Holzinger-class patrol vessels but with a different superstructure. They have a standard displacement of 1,300 long tons (1,300 t) and 1,470 long tons (1,490 t) at full load. The vessels measure 81.4 meters (267 ft 1 in) long with a beam of 10.5 m (34 ft 5 in) and a draft of 3.9 m (12 ft 10 in). The patrol vessels are propelled by two shafts powered by two Caterpillar 3616 V16 diesel engines rated at 6,197 horsepower (4,621 kW). They have a maximum speed of 20 knots (37 km/h; 23 mph). (Note: Jane's Fighting Ships states that the maximum speed is 18 knots (33 km/h; 21 mph).) For electrical power, the Durango class are equipped with two 260 kilowatt generators and one 190 kW generator.

The patrol vessels are armed with a single Bofors 57 mm (2.2 in)/70 caliber gun Mk 3 mounted forward capable of firing 220 rounds/minute to a range of 17 kilometers (11 mi). The ships mount an Alenia 2 combat data system and Saab EOS 450 optronic director for fire control. They are equipped with air and surface search radar. The Durango class has a complement of 74 including 10 officers with the capability to transport 55 additional personnel. Vessels of the class carry an 11-meter (36 ft) interceptor craft capable of over 50 knots (93 km/h; 58 mph). The vessels also mount a helicopter deck over the stern and a hangar and are capable of operating one medium helicopter.

== Construction and career ==
The ship was laid down at ASTIMAR 1 shipyard in Tampico, Tamaulipas on 18 December 1999. The vessel was launched and commissioned into the Mexican Navy on 11 September 2000. On 6 December 2009, Durango, in a joint operation with a United States Coast Guard ship, intercepted four boats 55 nautical miles (102 km) from the Guatemalan – Mexico border in the Pacific Ocean. Twenty packages of cocaine with the weight of 262 kilograms (578 lb) were seized and nine men were detained.

In July 2017 Durango took part in the multinational naval exercise UNITAS 2017 off Peru. On 3 August, Durango responded to a distress call by the tuna fishing vessel Conquista near Puerto Chiapas after the fishing vessel's helicopter crashed into the sea. Using the embarked Panther helicopter, Durango evacuated the two downed aircrew to a nearby naval hospital.

In May 2021, two members of the crew tested positive for COVID-19. They were removed from the ship and taken to Guaymas Naval Hospital. The crew were tested after returning to base on 27 April.

== Sources ==
- Saunders, Stephen, ed. (2004). Jane's Fighting Ships 2004–2005 (107 ed.). Alexandria, Virginia: Jane's Information Group Inc. ISBN 0-7106-2623-1.
- Saunders, Stephen, ed. (2009). Jane's Fighting Ships 2009–2010 (112 ed.). Alexandria, Virginia: Jane's Information Group Inc. ISBN 978-0-7106-2888-6.
- "Buque Tipo Patrulla Oceanica Clase "Durango"" [Oceanic Patrol Vessel Class "Durango"]. Secretaria de Marina Mexico (in Spanish).
