= Sierra class =

Sierra class may refer to the following:

- Sierra-class submarine, a Soviet/Russian Navy submarine class
- Sierra-class corvette, a Mexican Navy corvette class
