= Guanajuato, Mexico =

Guanajuato, Mexico, may refer to:

- The state of Guanajuato, one of the 32 component federal entities of the United Mexican States
- Guanajuato, Guanajuato, capital city of that state

== See also ==
- Guanajuato (disambiguation)
