= ARM Durango =

At least two ships of the Mexican Navy have been named ARM Durango:

- ARM Durango (1935)
- ARM Durango (PO-151)
