= ARM Sonora =

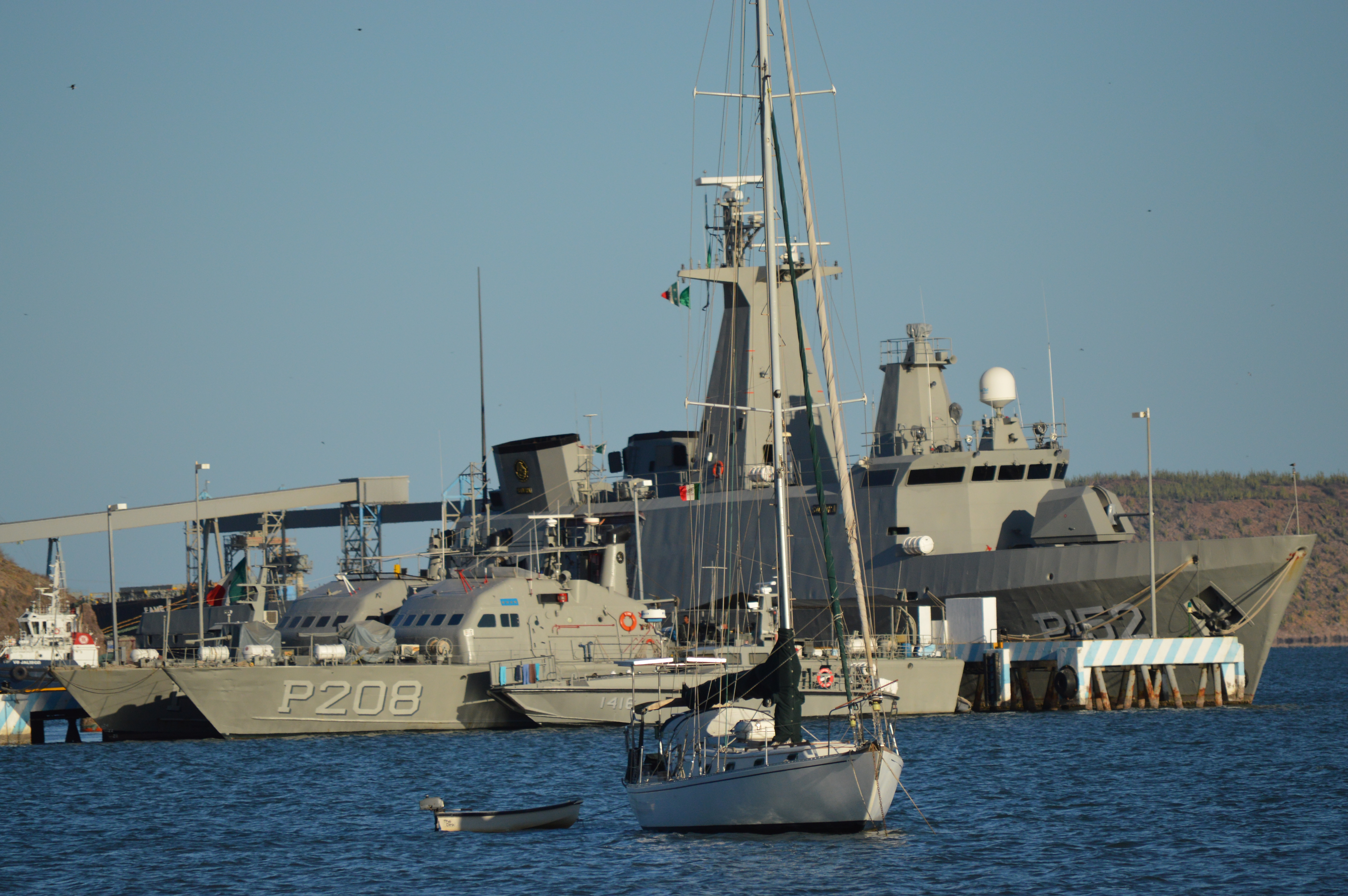
- ARM Sonora docked at Guaymas in 2016

History

Mexico
- Name: ARM Sonora
- Builder: Mexican Navy Ship yards
- Laid down: 14 December 1999
- Launched: 4 September 2000
- Commissioned: 4 September 2000
- Identification: Pennant number: PO-152
- Status: In active service

General characteristics
- Class & type: Durango-class patrol vessel
- Displacement: 1,300 long tons (1,300 t) standard; 1,470 long tons (1,490 t) full load
- Length: 81.4 m (267 ft 1 in)
- Beam: 10.5 m (34 ft 5 in)
- Draft: 3.9 m (12 ft 10 in)
- Propulsion: 2 x Caterpillar 3616 diesel engines; 6,197 hp (4,621 kW); 2 shafts
- Speed: 20 knots (37 km/h; 23 mph)
- Complement: 74
- Sensors & processing systems: Saab EOS 450 optronic director; Surface and air search radar
- Armament: Bofors 57 mm/70 caliber gun Mk 3
- Aircraft carried: 1 medium helicopter
- Aviation facilities: One helicopter hangar

ARM Sonora (PO-152) is a Durango-class patrol vessel in service with the Mexican Navy with a 57 mm (2.2 in) main gun turret and a helicopter landing pad, primarily used for illicit drug interdiction. Like other ships of this class, it was designed and built in Mexican dockyards. The vessel was launched and commissioned on 4 September 2000 and is in active service.

== Description ==
The Durango-class design is based on the Holzinger-class patrol vessels but with a different superstructure. They have a standard displacement of 1,300 long tons (1,300 t) and 1,470 long tons (1,490 t) at full load. The vessels measure 81.4 meters (267 ft 1 in) long with a beam of 10.5 m (34 ft 5 in) and a draft of 3.9 m (12 ft 10 in). The patrol vessels are propelled by two shafts powered by two Caterpillar 3616 V16 diesel engines rated at 6,197 horsepower (4,621 kW). They have a maximum speed of 20 knots (37 km/h; 23 mph). (Note: Jane's Fighting Ships states that the maximum speed is 18 knots (33 km/h; 21 mph).) For electrical power, the Durango class are equipped with two 260 kilowatt generators and one 190 kW generator.

The patrol vessels are armed with a single Bofors 57 mm (2.2 in)/70 caliber gun Mk 3 mounted forward capable of firing 220 rounds/minute to a range of 17 kilometers (11 mi). The ships mount an Alenia 2 combat data system and Saab EOS 450 optronic director for fire control. They are equipped with air and surface search radar. The Durango class has a complement of 74 including 10 officers with the capability to transport 55 additional personnel. Vessels of the class carry an 11-meter (36 ft) interceptor craft capable of over 50 knots (93 km/h; 58 mph). The vessels also mount a helicopter deck over the stern and a hangar and are capable of operating one medium helicopter.

== Construction and career ==
The ship was laid down at ASTIMAR 20 shipyard in Salina Cruz, Oaxaca on 14 December 1999. Sonora was launched and commissioned into the Mexican Navy on 4 September 2000. In 2014, Sonora was among the Mexican units dispatched to Peru for the multi-national military exercise UNITAS. In 2018, Sonora was authorized to train with foreign navies. In July, the patrol vessel trained with the United States Navy at San Diego, California. In 2020, a member of Sonora's crew tested positive for COVID-19. The crew member was sent home while the rest of the crew, who showed no signs, remained isolated aboard their ship.

== Sources ==
- Saunders, Stephen, ed. (2004). Jane's Fighting Ships 2004–2005 (107 ed.). Alexandria, Virginia: Jane's Information Group Inc. ISBN 0-7106-2623-1.
- Saunders, Stephen, ed. (2009). Jane's Fighting Ships 2009–2010 (112 ed.). Alexandria, Virginia: Jane's Information Group Inc. ISBN 978-0-7106-2888-6.
- "Buque Tipo Patrulla Oceanica Clase "Durango"" [Oceanic Patrol Vessel Class "Durango"]. Secretaria de Marina Mexico (in Spanish).
