= ARM Veracruz =

Mexican Navy Patrol Vessel

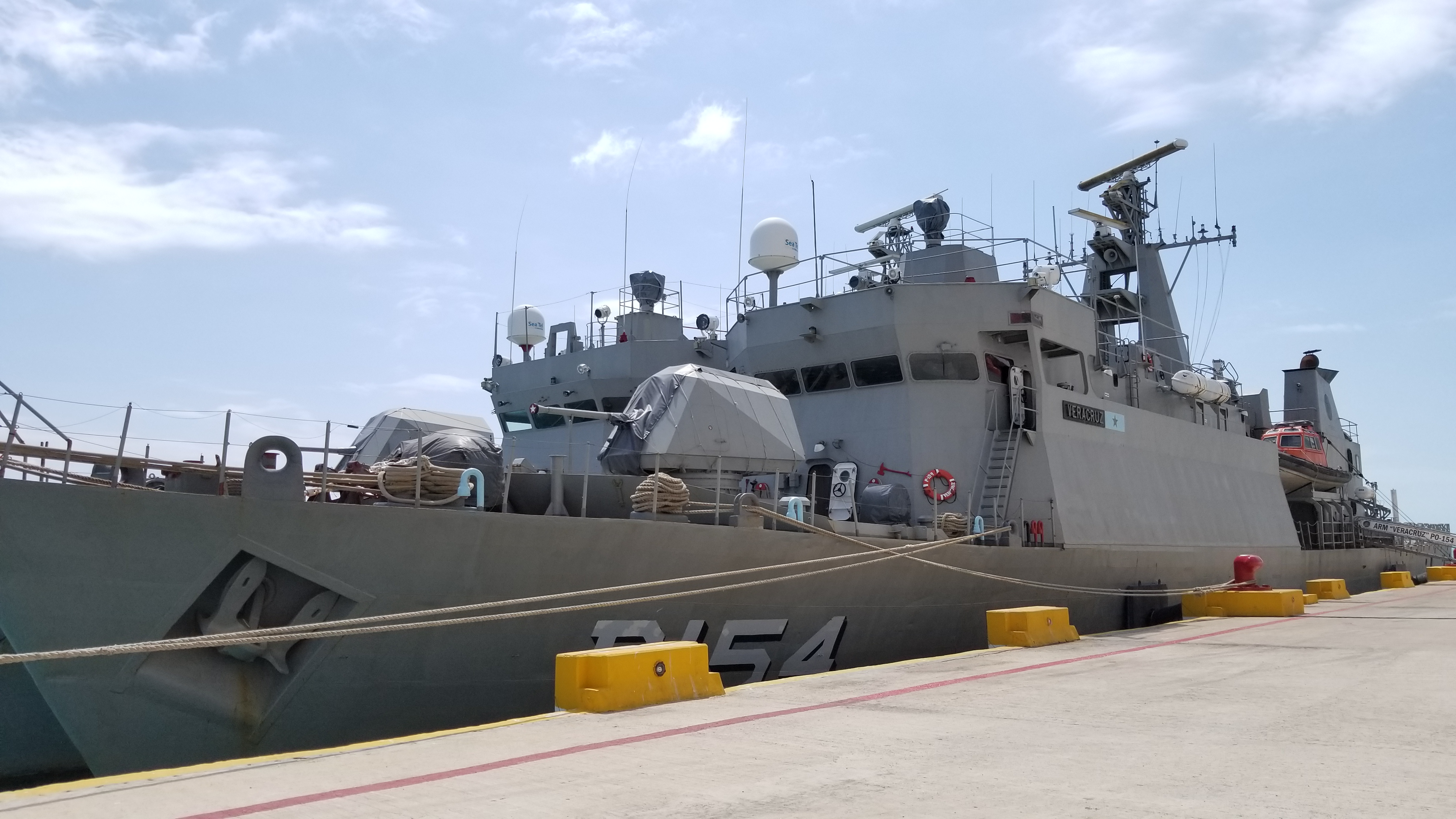
- ARM Veracruz docked at Progreso, Yucatan, Mexico. Her sister ship, Guanajuato is docked alongside her on the other side

History

Mexico
- Name: Veracruz
- Builder: Mexican Navy Ship yards
- Commissioned: September 11, 2000
- Identification: Pennant number: PO-154
- Status: Active

General characteristics
- Class & type: Durango-class patrol vessel
- Displacement: 1,300 tons
- Length: 81.4 m (267 ft)
- Beam: 10.5 m (34 ft)
- Draft: 3.90 m (12.8 ft)
- Speed: 20 knots (37 km/h)
- Troops: capacity for 70
- Complement: 55
- Armament: Bofors 57 mm Mk 3 gun; 9K38 Igla
- Armor: Rolled armor with composite overlay
- Aircraft carried: Eurocopter Fennec
- Aviation facilities: Helipad and helicopter hangar

ARM Veracruz (PO-154) is a Durango-class patrol vessel in service with the Mexican Navy with a 57 mm main gun turret and a helicopter landing pad, currently primarily used to fight drug cartels. It is also armed with SA-18 Grouse missiles. Like other ships of this class, it was designed and built in Mexican dockyards, and is sometimes referred to as a compact frigate.
