= Isla Tiburón-class logistics ship =

Class of logistics ships of the Mexican Navy

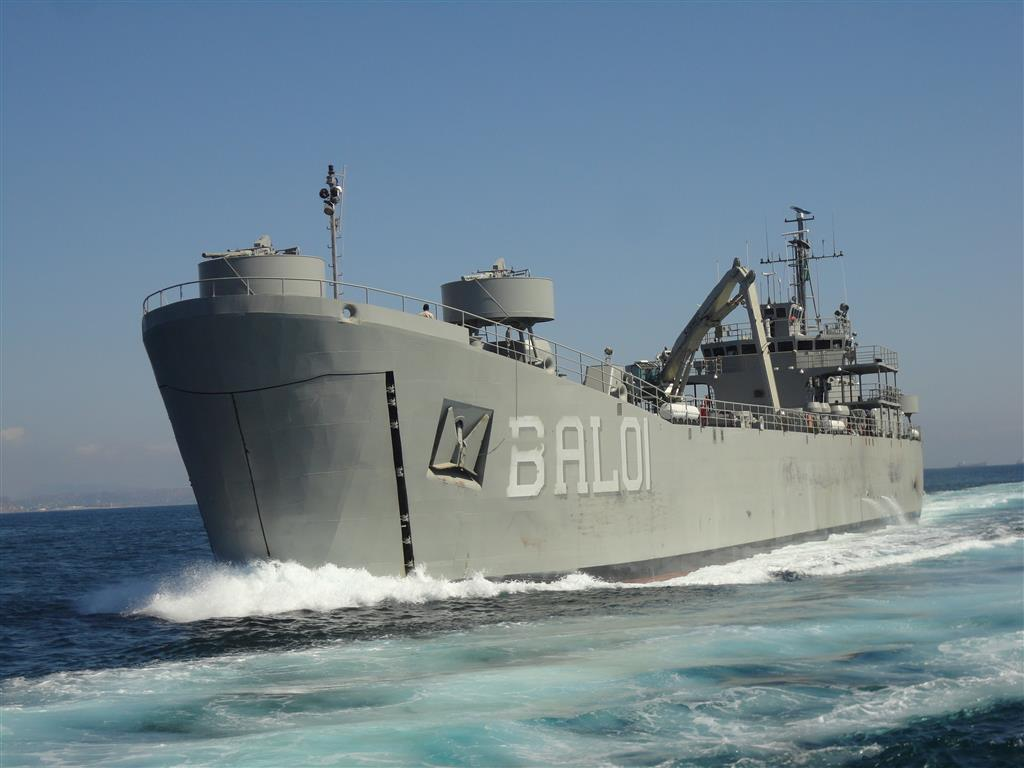
- ARM Montes Azules

Class overview
- Name: 2011-2023 Montes Azules-class; from 2023 Isla Tiburón-class
- Builders: ASTIMAR, Oaxaca
- Operators: Mexican Navy
- Succeeded by: Isla Madre class
- In commission: 2011-present
- Planned: 2
- Completed: 2
- Active: 2

General characteristics
- Type: Logistics ship
- Displacement: 3,666 t (3,608 long tons)
- Length: 99.8 m (327 ft)
- Beam: 15.24 m (50.0 ft)
- Propulsion: 2 × Diesel engines, 2 × shafts
- Speed: 12 knots (22 km/h; 14 mph)
- Endurance: 60 days
- Boats & landing craft carried: 2 × LCVPs
- Troops: 89 officers and enlisted men
- Armament: 5 × Bofors 40 mm guns
- Aviation facilities: Helipad

The Isla Tiburón-class logistics ship is a class of logistics ships that are operated by the Mexican Navy. They are sometimes referred to as transport ships. Until 2023 the ships were designated as the Montes Azules-class.

== Design ==
They are the largest ship built by the Secretary of the Navy to date, in addition to the fact that it has the facility to accommodate female personnel from its own crew, not to mention that it is equipped with modern equipment that will allow it to reliably navigate.

The BAL-02 is based on the concept of the Pánuco-class tank landing ships, they hold a crew of 89 members, including female personnel. Its length (length) is 99.80 meters, the beam (width) is 15.24 meters, it will reach a speed of up to 12 knots with an autonomy (maximum time without refueling) of 60 days and a maximum displacement of 3,666 tons. While the propulsion plant consists of two diesel internal combustion engines of 1,750 BHP at 1,000 RPM each.

The Logistics Support Ships project was born from the need to rethink the definition of the basic characteristics of the surface units required by the Mexican Navy, to fulfill its mission in terms of supporting the civilian population in disaster areas, by transporting and disembarkation of vehicles, supplies and personnel on beaches and/or docks. they have a platform for the helicopter to takeoff and land (MI-17 and UH-60 Black Hawk) and a JP-5 fuel supply system for helicopters, with a storage capacity of 15,000 liters. In addition, it will have two landing craft with the capacity to transport personnel and load vehicles.

On this occasion the investment of the BAL-02 was not specified, but the first largest ship built in Semar shipyards was the ARM Montes Azules (BAL-01), very similar to the later BAL-02 and launched in August 2011, for an investment cost of 24 million dollars. The two ships were renamed, and redesignate Isla Tiburón-class in 2023.

== Ships in the class ==
Isla Tiburón (formerly Montes Azules) class
Hull no.	Name	Namesake	Builder	Launched	Commissioned	Renamed 2023	Namesake	Status
BAL-01	Montes Azules	Montes Azules	ASTIMAR, Oaxaca	30 August 2011	2 September 2011	Isla Tiburón	Isla Tiburón	Active
BAL-02	Libertador	Libertador	ASTIMAR, Oaxaca	12 November 2012	10 September 2012	Isla Holbox	Isla Holbox	Active

== See also ==
- List of ships of the Mexican Navy

Equivalent auxiliary ships of the same era

- Type 072A (Batch 2)
- McClung class
- Teluk Bintuni class
- Ivan Gren class
