= Tenochtitlan-class patrol vessel =

Mexican Navy class of patrol vessels

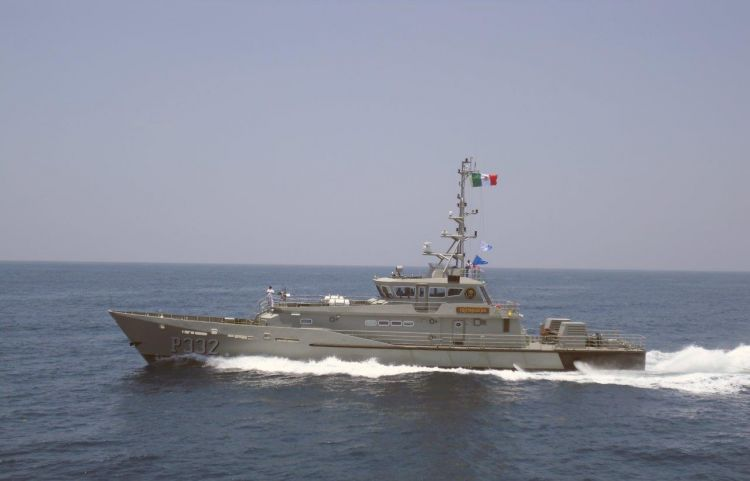
- ARM Teotihuacan (PC-332)

Class overview
- Name: Tenochtitlan class
- Builders: Tampico Naval Shipyard
- Operators: Mexican Navy
- Preceded by: Punta class
- Built: 2011–
- In commission: 2012–
- Planned: 10
- Active: 10

General characteristics
- Type: Coastal patrol vessel
- Displacement: 239 t
- Length: 42.8 m (140 ft)
- Beam: 7.11 m (23.3 ft)
- Draft: 3.77 ft 8 in (1.35 m)
- Propulsion: 2 × Caterpillar 3516B TA- HD / D diesel engines
- Speed: 25 knots (46 km/h; 29 mph)
- Complement: 18
- Sensors & processing systems: 1 × JCR JMAS5310-6X BAND radar
- Armament: 2 × M2 12.7 mm MG

Tenochtitlan-class patrol vessels (also known as Mexican Navy 42 metre patrol vessels) is a Mexican Navy class of patrol vessels in 2012, that is based on the Damen Stan 4207 patrol vessel design. Over a dozen navies, coast guards and other government agencies operate vessels based on this design. While some of those vessels are equipped for purely civilian patrols, the Mexican vessels are armed with a pair of Browning M2 machine guns, and a jet-boat pursuit craft that can be launched and retrieved via a stern launching ramp, while the vessel is underway.

Some reports assert the Mexican vessels are based on the same design as the United States Coast Guard's Sentinel-class cutters.. While similar in many respects, the Sentinel cutters are based on the Damen Group's 47 metre patrol vessel.

As of the summer of 2017 ten vessels had been ordered, of which ten have been delivered and commissioned.

== Ships ==
Pennant number	Ship name	Launched	Commissioned	Status
PC-331	ARM Tenochtitlan		June 1, 2012	Active
PC-332	ARM Teotihuacan		June 1, 2012	Active
PC-333	ARM Palenque	March 1, 2014	April 21, 2014	Active
PC-334	ARM Mitla	May 29, 2014	January 7, 2015	Active
PC-335	ARM Uxmal	March 19, 2015	July 23, 2015	Active
PC-336	ARM Tajín	June 12, 2015	November 23, 2015	Active
PC-337	ARM Tulum	February 11, 2016	August 11, 2016	Active
PC-338	ARM Monte Albán	July 11, 2016	April 21, 2017	Active
PC-339	ARM Bonampak	January 12, 2017	July 28, 2017	Active
PC-340	ARM Chichen Itzá	June 27, 2017	November 6, 2017	Active
