= ARM Romero =

Mexican naval ship

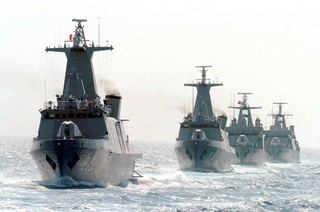
- The four Sierra-class corvettes

History

Mexico
- Name: Romero
- Builder: Mexican Naval Shipyards
- Laid down: 23 July 1998
- Launched: 17 September 1999
- Commissioned: 17 September 1999
- Identification: Pennant number: PO 144
- Status: In active service

General characteristics
- Class & type: Sierra-class corvette
- Displacement: 1,366 t (1,344 long tons) full load
- Length: 70.4 m (231 ft 0 in)
- Beam: 10.5 m (34 ft 5 in)
- Draught: 2.8 m (9 ft 2 in)
- Propulsion: 2 diesel Caterpillar 3616 V16 12,394 bhp (9,242 kW)
- Speed: 18 knots (33 km/h; 21 mph)
- Complement: 76
- Sensors & processing systems: Fire control system: Saab EOS 450 optronic director; Surface/air search radar E/F and I-bands; Alenia 2 combat data system
- Armament: 1 Bofors 57 mm gun Mk 3; SA-N-10 surface-to-air missile (Matias Romero only)
- Aircraft carried: 1 × MBB Bo 105C helicopter
- Aviation facilities: One helicopter hangar and helipad

ARM Romero, also referred to as ARM Matias Romero, is a Sierra-class offshore patrol vessel of the Mexican Navy. The ship was constructed at Salina Cruz Shipyard in Salina Cruz, Oaxaca, with Romero being launched on 17 September 1999 and entering service the same day.

== Description ==
The Sierra class as built had a full load displacement of 1,366 tonnes (1,344 long tons) and measured 70.4 metres (231 ft 0 in) long with a beam of 10.5 m (34 ft 5 in) and a draught of 2.8 m (9 ft 2 in). According to the Mexican Navy, the vessels have a length of 75.15 metres (246 ft 7 in), a beam of 10.5 m (34 ft 5 in), a draught of 3.18 m (10 ft 5 in) and a normal displacement of 950 t (930 long tons). The corvettes are powered by two Caterpillar 3616 V16 diesel engines turning two shafts creating 9,242 kilowatts (12,394 bhp) total. This gave the vessels a speed of 18 knots (33 km/h; 21 mph) or 23 knots (43 km/h; 26 mph). The vessels have two 260 kW (350 hp) and one 190 kW (250 hp) generators for power production.

The Sierra class mount a Saab EOS 450 optronic director for fire control, and radars operating on the E/F and I-bands for navigation, surface and air search. They are equipped with the Alenia 2 combat data system. These ships have an aft flight deck and hangar for one MBB Bo 105C helicopter. The corvettes are armed with one 57-millimetre (2.2 in) Mk3 naval gun on the fore deck to engage air and surface targets. Romero alone in the class is also equipped with an SA-N-10 surface-to-air missile. The ships carry an 11 m (36 ft) interceptor craft capable of 50 knots (93 km/h; 58 mph). The corvettes have a complement of 75 including 10 officers.

== Construction and career ==
The ship was constructed at Salina Cruz Shipyard in Salina Cruz, Oaxaca, Mexico. The vessel was laid down on 23 July 1998 and launched on 17 September 1999. The ship was commissioned into Mexican Navy service on 17 September 1999. (Note: Alternatively given as 21 April 2000.) In 2017, following an earthquake, Romero was dispatched to Salina Cruz with humanitarian relief supplies and supported the local population as it recovered.
