= ARM Durango (1935) =

Mexican ship from World War II and the post-war era

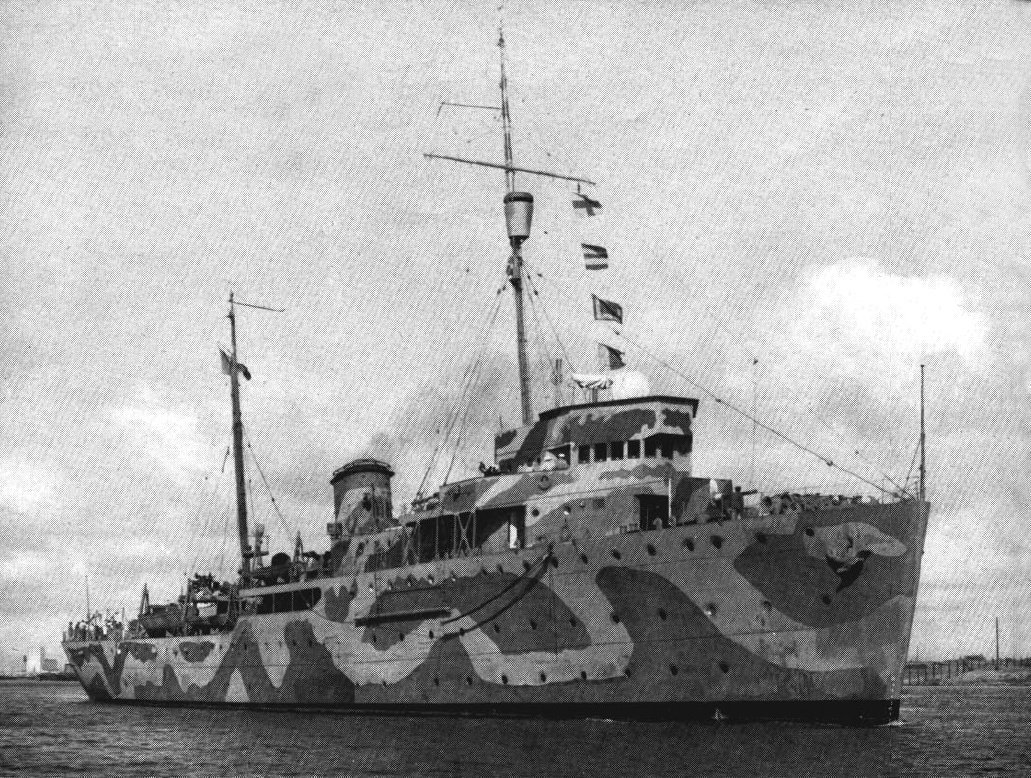
- Durango in the 1940s in the American camouflage

History

Mexico
- Name: Durango
- Builder: Union Naval de Levante, Valencia
- Laid down: October 28, 1933
- Launched: June 28, 1935
- Out of service: July 16, 2001
- Fate: scrapped in 2009

General characteristics as built
- Type: Gunboat – troopship/training ship
- Displacement: 1,600 t (1,600 long tons) (standard) 2,000 t (2,000 long tons) (full)
- Length: 92.35 m (303 ft 0 in)
- Draft: 3.05 m (10 ft 0 in)
- Propulsion: 2 steam turbines with a total power of 6,500 hp (4,800 kW); 2 boilers, 2 propellers
- Speed: 20 knots (37 km/h; 23 mph)
- Range: 3,000 nmi (5,600 km; 3,500 mi) at 15 knots (28 km/h; 17 mph)
- Complement: 141
- Armament: 2 × single 102 mm guns; 2 × single 57 mm guns; 2 × twin 25 mm anti-aircraft guns; 2 × twin 13.2 mm heavy anti-aircraft machine guns

Durango was a Mexican ship from the period of World War II and the post-war era, a hybrid of a gunboat and a troopship, also used as a training ship, built in Spain. Launched in 1935, it served in the Mexican Navy for 65 years, from 1936 to 2001. It was the lead ship of the Durango class, which consisted of two ships. The second one was completed in a modified form and acquired by Spain.

The main armament of the Durango consisted of two 102 mm guns. Its full displacement was 2,000 tonnes (2,000 long tons). It was initially powered by steam turbines, allowing a speed of 20 knots (37 km/h; 23 mph); these were replaced in the 1960s with diesel engines with an electric transmission. The ship could transport up to 490 soldiers and 80 horses. It bore the pennant numbers 128, B-1, and B-01.

== History ==
In the early 1930s, Mexico had a small navy whose core consisted of a few early 20th-century gunboats and an obsolete coastal defense battleship, Anáhuac. At that time, Mexico established cooperation with the newly proclaimed Second Spanish Republic, with which it shared historical, cultural, and ideological ties. Spain was then struggling with the global economic crisis and had reduced spending on naval expansion compared to the plans from the monarchical era and thus sought employment for its shipbuilding industry. As a result, Mexico decided to modernize its navy based on cooperation with Spain, and at the end of 1932, the two countries signed an agreement for the construction of 15 ships. Part of the program was to be financed by a loan of 73 million pesetas, which the Spanish government agreed to provide on 28 December 1932 with a repayment term until 1939. In February 1933, an order was placed for the first phase, which included three gunboats of the Guanajuato class and 10 small coastal defense vessels (patrol boats) of the G class, and in the second phase, two large gunboat-troopships.

A distinctive feature of the Mexican navy since the early 20th century was the ordering of multi-purpose gunboats that also served to transport troops. Two Tampico-class gunboats, built in the US and launched in 1902, could carry 200 soldiers each. An extension of this concept was the General Guerrero from 1908, which could transport 550 soldiers, 45 horses, and several cannons. The culmination of this line of development was the Durango-class gunboats. The technical specifications of these ships were developed by Mexicans, while the design was completed in Spain. The starting point for the design was the Spanish Canovas del Castillo-class gunboats (which also served as a prototype for the Guanajuato-class ships).

Orders were distributed among various Spanish shipyards. The construction of the first transport ship was entrusted to the private shipyard Union Naval de Levante in Valencia. The keel was laid on 28 October 1933, and the ship was launched on 28 June 1935. It was named Durango after a state in Mexico. Sea trials were conducted between 18 and 20 May 1936, after which it was delivered to the customer in June 1936. The second ship, Zacatecas, being built in Cádiz, was not completed at the outbreak of the Spanish Civil War and was later incorporated into the Francoist navy as Calvo Sotelo.

Durango was originally classified as a war troopship (Transporte de guerra), also referred to as a troopship-gunboat (Transporte-Cañonero). In English-language literature, it was sometimes referred to as a sloop, and after the war, as a frigate.

== Description ==
=== Architecture and hull ===
The ship had a characteristic, spacious hull with high sides and wide frames to increase the capacity of the internal spaces. The bow and stern stems were straight and slightly inclined. The forecastle was raised over almost half of the ship's length, transitioning further into the superstructure deck. The bow's sides were 5.25 meters high, and the bow section featured three rows of portholes corresponding to the decks. After modernization in the 1960s, the sides were raised also amidships, and the forecastle extended beyond the middle of the ship's length. At that time, the lowest row of portholes was sealed to avoid flooding risk. The two main guns were located on the forecastle near the bow and on the aft deck. Directly behind the bow gun was the forward superstructure with a characteristic raised glass-enclosed bridge near the bow, with an open bridge on the roof. During modernization, the upper deck of the superstructure was also extended. A single inclined funnel was located behind the superstructure, still before the midpoint of the ship's length. After modernization, the funnel was replaced with a smaller, more modern streamlined shape, venting exhaust from the engines. The silhouette was completed by two inclined pole masts, with the forward mast having a crow's nest and crane. After modernization, the masts were replaced with light, tripod lattice masts in slightly different positions.

The hull had three continuous decks (including the upper one), with the lower deck located below the waterline. To facilitate loading, the ship had double-leaf doors on both sides amidships, leading to the onboard stable, which could also be adapted for transporting cargo or artillery. Inside, the hull was divided by transverse watertight bulkheads, but only two of them extended to the full height of the hull up to the upper deck (at frames 60 and 85, separating the boiler rooms from other compartments). The boiler room, with two boilers arranged one behind the other, did not occupy the entire width of the hull, and compartments on its sides provided additional protection. The engine room, with two turbines, was located further toward the stern. The hull was riveted throughout. There was a double hull running the entire length of the ship.

The standard displacement of the ship was specified at 1,600 tonnes, with a full displacement according to various sources of either 1,950 or 2,000 tonnes. (Note: The full displacement is usually given as 2,000 tonnes (Patianin, Barabanow & Mitiukow (2008, p. 28); Blackman (1961, p. 155); Moore (1975, p. 239)), and as 1,950 tonnes according to Mitiuckow & Lisarraga (2007, p. 55) and Blackman (1953, p. 254). The standard displacement is 1,600 tonnes according to most sources.) After reconstruction, the full displacement decreased to 1,800 tonnes. The overall length of the ship was 92.35 meters, and between perpendiculars 85.95 meters, or according to other sources, 93.8 meters and 85.8 meters, respectively. (Note: Since the 1970s, Jane's yearbooks have reported a significantly shorter overall length of 78.2 meters and a width of 11.2 meters (e.g., Moore (1975, p. 239)). There is no information about the ship being shortened during modernization.) The width was 12.19 meters, and the draft was 3.05 meters at standard displacement and 3.6 meters at full displacement.

The crew initially consisted of 141 people. Later naval records listed the crew size as 149, including 24 officers. Additionally, it could transport 450 soldiers, 40 officers, and 80 horses.

=== Armament ===
The main artillery armament consisted of two British 102 mm guns (actual caliber 101.6 mm) of the Vickers system, export model Mk LA, the same as those used on the Guanajuato-class gunboats. The barrel length was 45 calibers (L/45). The guns were manufactured by SECN at the Arsenal de La Carraca in Spain under British license. They were mounted in single positions with protective shields at the bow and stern. The guns had an elevation angle of up to +30° and a range of up to 7 nautical miles.

The armament was supplemented by two single older model 57 mm Nordenfelt guns, positioned on either side of the funnel. These guns served as saluting guns and remained in service until the end of the ship's operational period. The anti-aircraft armament consisted of four 25 mm Hotchkiss anti-aircraft guns (two twin-mounted), fed from 15-round magazines. They were complemented by two twin-mounted Hotchkiss 13.2 mm machine guns. (Note: Four 13.2 mm Hotchkiss heavy machine guns on two standard twin mounts, according to Patianin, Barabanow & Mitiukow (2008, pp. 28–29), Gogin (2021, p. 353), and McMurtrie (1937, p. 362), were equipped on both Durango and the Guanajuato-class gunboats. In contrast, Mitiuckow & Lisarraga (2007, pp. 54–55) report two quadruple machine guns of this caliber, which raises doubts. Additionally, McMurtrie (1941, p. 346) generally mentions eight 13 mm heavy machine guns. Post-war editions of Jane's state there were only two 13.2 mm machine guns, also providing outdated information on the 25 mm guns, e.g., Blackman (1953, p. 254).) In 1942, during limited modernization in the US, the 25 mm guns were replaced by three single Oerlikon 20 mm cannons. At that time, the ship also received two depth charge throwers, each capable of deploying five depth charges, with a total stock of 30 Mk VI bombs weighing 136 kg each. The depth charge throwers were removed after the war. During a major modernization in 1967, the ship received a fourth 20 mm gun. Between the late 1970s and early 1980s, the aft main artillery gun was removed, leaving one 102 mm gun.

=== Propulsion ===
Originally, the propulsion consisted of two sets of Parsons steam turbines with reduction gears, with a total power of 6,500 hp. (Note: According to Mitiuckow & Lisarraga (2007, pp. 53, 55), contrary to most sources, the nominal power of the propulsion system was 5,000 hp.) The turbines were manufactured by the shipbuilding company Sociedad Española de Construcción Naval (SECN). Steam was provided by two Yarrow boilers. The powerplant drove two propellers. The contract maximum speed of 19 knots was exceeded during trials, and Durango achieved an average maximum speed of 21 knots over a 4-hour test. (Note: Most sources report the ship's speed as 20 knots (McMurtrie (1941, p. 346); Patianin, Barabanow & Mitiukow (2008, p. 28)).) There are significant discrepancies in publications regarding the liquid fuel capacity, ranging from 140 to 400 tons. (Note: The fuel capacity is listed as 140 tons according to sources such as Blackman (1953, p. 254) and Moore (1975, p. 239). In contrast, Blackman (1961, p. 155) reports a significantly higher value of 400 tons (as do Patianin, Barabanow & Mitiukow (2008, p. 28) and Gogin (2021, p. 353)). Mitiuckow & Lisarraga (2007, p. 52) provide figures for the sister ship Zacatecas, with a fuel capacity in tanks below the double bottom of 138 tons, and a total of 253 tons.) The range was 3,000 nautical miles at a speed of 15 knots. (Note: The original range of 3,000 nautical miles at a speed of 15 knots is reported by most sources (including Patianin, Barabanow & Mitiukow (2008, p. 28) and Blackman (1961, p. 155)). In contrast, Mitiuckow & Lisarraga (2007, p. 52) state this range at a speed of 12 knots, which is the value given by other sources for the ship only after modernization (Moore (1975, p. 239)).)

In 1967, the steam turbine propulsion was replaced with a diesel-electric system. The turbines and boilers were replaced with two Enterprise DMR-38 diesel engines with a combined power of 5,000 hp. These engines drove two propellers via electric motors. (Note: According to Jane's yearbooks (e.g., Moore (1975, p. 239)) and Patianin, Barabanow & Mitiukow (2008, p. 28), the information is consistent. However, Mitiuckow & Lisarraga (2007, p. 53) partially differ, as they do not mention electric motors, stating instead that each diesel engine worked on its own shaft (it is unclear if this was direct).) The maximum speed was 18 knots, and the economical speed was 12 knots, with a range still at 3,000 nautical miles. (Note: According to Jane's yearbooks (e.g., Moore (1975, p. 239)), the values are consistent. In contrast, Mitiuckow & Lisarraga (2007, p. 53) report lower figures, with a maximum speed of 12 knots and an economical speed of 10 knots.)

=== Equipment ===
Initially, the ship's electronic equipment included only radio communication stations and a radio direction finder. It was not until the modernization in the 1960s that it received radar and a LORAN radionavigation system. The ship was not equipped with sonar.

== Service ==
Durango was commissioned into Mexican service in Valencia on 14 July 1936. (Note: Commissioned on 14 July 1936 according to Mitiuckow & Lisarraga (2007, pp. 51, 55), Patianin, Barabanow & Mitiukow (2008, p. 28) and Sharpe (2000, p. 455), while 15 July 1936 according to Mitiuckow & Lisarraga (2008, p. 40).) This occurred just before the outbreak of the Spanish Civil War on July 17, which led to the extension of acceptance trials and a change in plans that initially intended the ship to visit European ports, starting with Dunkirk. On August 26, the ship went to sea for the first time with a Mexican crew, sailing to Marseille, France, for additional outfitting before returning to Valencia. Taking on board refugees from Spain and visiting places like Gibraltar, Lisbon, and Havana along the way, the ship crossed the Atlantic and arrived in Veracruz, Mexico, on November 3. The first commander was Lieutenant Commander Manuel Zermeno Araico.

In the winter of 1936 and 1937, the ship made its first foreign visit to Mobile, United States. Between July 24 and August 26, it served as the state yacht for President Lázaro Cárdenas during a visit to Progreso in the state of Yucatán. On 1 November 1937, the ship was used for the first time to transport troops from Veracruz to Lerma. On 23 January 1938, the Mexican sports team was embarked on Durango for competitions in Colón, Panama. In August of that year, the ship also made its first 24-day training cruise with cadets. In 1939, the ship was used for similar tasks, and between March and May 1940, it made its first longer 48-day training cruise, covering nearly 10,500 nautical miles, and a voyage with a sports team on board to Valparaíso, Chile. Between September 28 and October 8, Durango participated in the celebrations of the 400th anniversary of the founding of the city of Campeche.

In May 1942, Mexico joined the Allies in World War II, and by summer, Durango, based in Veracruz, conducted five patrols in Mexican waters lasting 29 days. On June 18, it underwent modernization in Galveston, United States, where it was equipped with two depth charge racks with a supply of 30 bombs, although the ship did not have sonar to detect submarines. During this time, it was also repainted in the United States Navy's "Measure 12" camouflage. Durango served for the remainder of the war for patrol, escort, and transport duties without engaging with the enemy. At the end of 1945 and 1946, it was likely under repair. After the war, starting in July 1946, the ship continued to serve primarily for transport in state service, including for sports delegations, and also for fisheries protection. On 15 February 1948, it unsuccessfully searched for a missing passenger plane north of Veracruz. Probably for the first time in its career, Durango was used to transport horses on 12 February 1950, sailing with a Mexican delegation to Havana. During this period, the ship bore the pennant number 128.

In December 1963, the ship was withdrawn from active service due to wear and was then sent for an overhaul in Veracruz, combined with modernization, completed in 1967, during which the worn-out steam turbine power plant was replaced with diesel engines, reducing speed but increasing operational economy. During this time, in March 1964, the ship's primary role was changed to a training ship. Between September 23 and October 6, 1968, Durango was used to transport the Olympic flame from The Bahamas to Veracruz in connection with the 1968 Summer Olympics in Mexico. On the last few hundred meters to the shore, the torch was carried by Mexican swimmers.

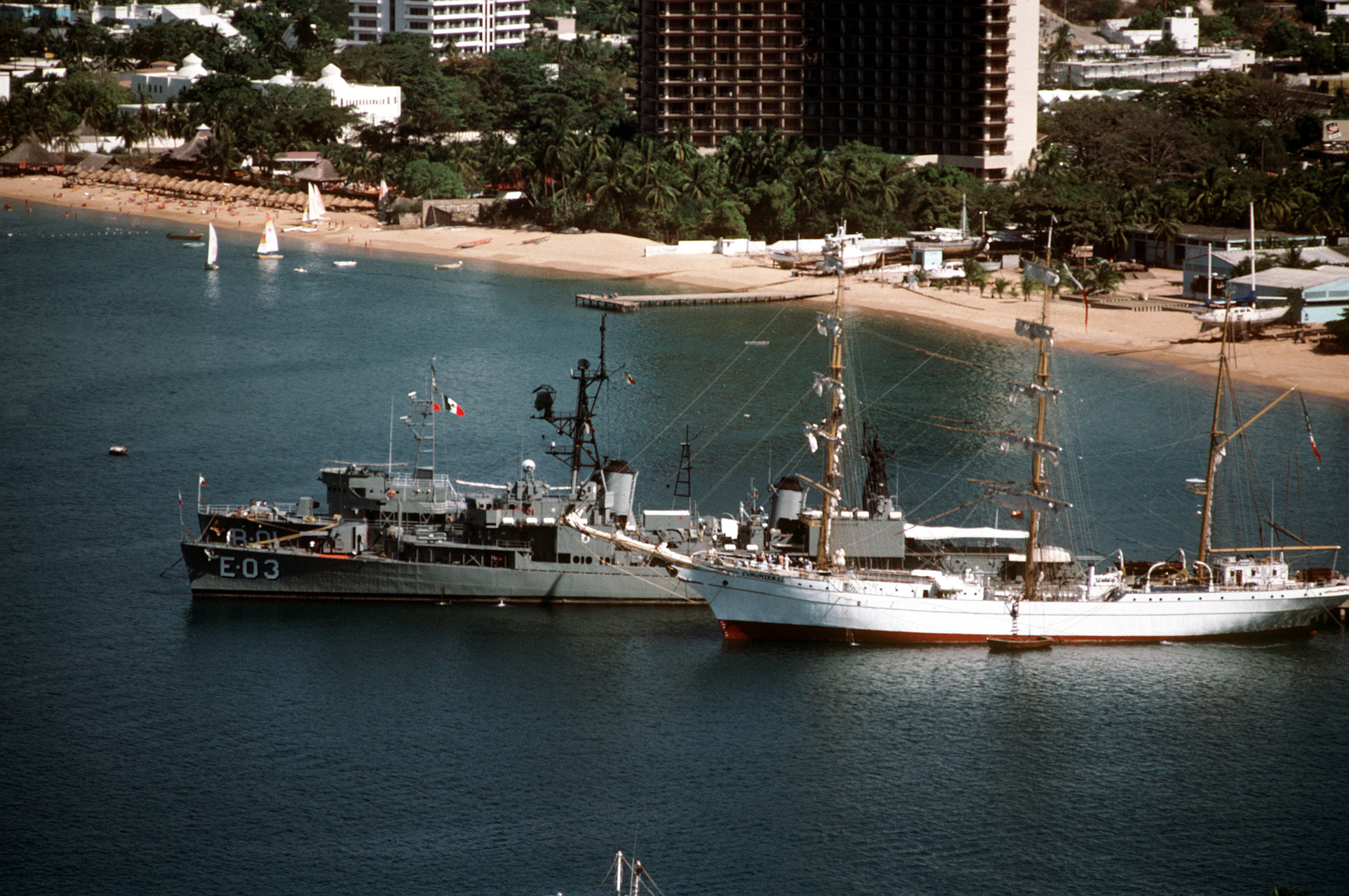
Durango (in the background) with the frigate Quetzalcóatl and the training ship Cuauhtémoc at Acapulco, 1985

Starting in 1969, Durango began making long training cruises with cadets, beginning with a voyage to the Pacific, visiting Samoa, Sydney, Wellington, and Tahiti. In 1970, it sailed to Panama, Venezuela, Brazil, and Colombia, and in 1971 to Europe, reaching as far as Antwerp. During this period, the hull number was changed to B-1 under a new system. (Note: Information about the change of number from "128" to the new number B-1 is shown in a 1972 photograph (Moore (1975, p. 239)). The number B-01 appears in a 1982 photograph (Moore (1986, p. 357)).) In 1974, the ship delivered medical supplies and doctors to Puerto Cortés after an earthquake in Honduras. By the late 1970s, the ship was inactive but was later restored to service. It participated in fleet maneuvers, mainly as a transport or staff ship, including in 1981 ("Antigua-81") and 1983 ("Patria-83"). During this period, by the early 1980s, the hull number was changed to B-01. In the 1980s, Durango also served for several years in a program for the rehabilitation of juvenile offenders through maritime practice.

Due to wear and obsolescence, on 16 July 2001, Durango was decommissioned after 65 years of service. In total, it sailed 405,868.9 nautical miles, spending 2,093 days at sea, and was commanded by 62 officers. It was intended to preserve Durango as a museum ship, and on 9 May 2003, the Navy handed it over for this purpose to the governor of the state of Sinaloa. It was temporarily anchored in Mazatlán, but an agreement could not be reached on where and in what form it should be displayed, while the condition of the non-maintained ship deteriorated. Ultimately, in 2009, Durango was taken over by the authorities of the state of Sinaloa and scrapped.

== Bibliography ==
- Gardiner, Robert; Chesneau, Roger, eds. (1980). Conway's All the World's Fighting Ships 1922–1946. London: Conway Maritime Press. ISBN 0-85177-146-7.
- Gogin, Ivan (2021). Navypedia's Fighting ships of World War Two 1937–1945. Part Two: Haiti – Siam. Gatchina: Navypedia LLC.
- McMurtrie, Francis, ed. (1937). Jane's Fighting Ships 1937. London: Sampson Low, Marston & Co.
- McMurtrie, Francis, ed. (1941). Jane's Fighting Ships 1940. London: Sampson Low, Marston & Co.
- Blackman, Raymond, ed. (1953). Jane's Fighting Ships 1953-54. London: Sampson Low, Marston & Co.
- Blackman, Raymond, ed. (1961). Jane's Fighting Ships 1961-62. London: Sampson Low, Marston & Co.
- Moore, John, ed. (1975). Jane's Fighting Ships 1975-76. New York: Franklin Watts. ISBN 0-531-03251-5.
- Moore, John, ed. (1986). Jane's Fighting Ships 1986-87. London: Jane's Publishing Company. ISBN 0-7106-0828-4.
- Sharpe, Richard, ed. (2000). Jane's Fighting Ships 2000–2001. Jane's Information Group Ltd. ISBN 0-7106-2018-7.
- Mitiuckow, Nikołaj; Lisarraga, Antonio Erce (2007). "Standardowe i uniwersalne. Część I". Okręty Wojenne (in Polish). 6 (86). ISSN 1231-014X.
- Mitiuckow, Nikołaj; Lisarraga, Antonio Erce (2008). "Standardowe i uniwersalne. Część II". Okręty Wojenne (in Polish). 1 (87). ISSN 1231-014X.
- Patianin, Siergiej; Barabanow, Michaił; Mitiukow, Nikołaj (2008). "Korabli Wtoroj mirowoj wojny. WMS stran Łatinskoj Amieriki i Azji". Morskaja Kampanija (in Russian). 4 (17). Moscow: Izdatielstwo Kollekcyja. ISSN 1231-014X.
