= ARM Guanajuato (PO-153) =

Mexican Nave oceanic patrol vessel

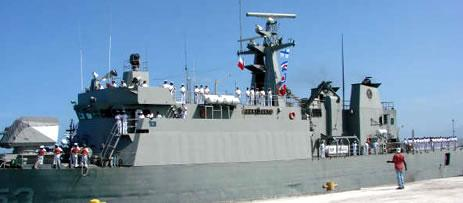
- ARM Guanajuato in Port-au-Prince

History

Mexico
- Name: Guanajuato
- Namesake: Guanajuato
- Builder: Mexican Navy Ship yards
- Commissioned: December 12, 2001
- Status: Active

General characteristics
- Class & type: Durango-class patrol vessel
- Displacement: 1300 Tons
- Length: 81.4 m (267 ft)
- Beam: 10.5 m (34 ft)
- Draft: 3.90 m (12.8 ft)
- Speed: 20 knots (37 km/h)
- Complement: 70 Troop capacity; 55 crew
- Armament: Bofors 57mm Mk 3 gun; 9K38 Igla
- Armor: Rolled armor with composite overlay
- Aircraft carried: Eurocopter Fennec
- Aviation facilities: Helipad and helicopter hangar

ARM Guanajuato (PO-153) is a Durango-class oceanic patrol vessel in the Mexican Navy with a 57mm main gun turret and a helicopter landing pad, currently primarily used for drug interception and maritime security in Mexican territorial waters. It is also armed with SA-18 Grouse missiles. Like other ships of this class, it was designed and built in Mexican dockyards, and is sometimes referred to as a compact frigate. It was named after the Mexican state of Guanajuato.

== Disaster relief operations ==
In an effort to assist the Haitian population following the disastrous 2008 earthquake, the Mexican government sent 20 t (20 long tons; 22 short tons) of food aid to Haiti. In charge of the task was the ARM Guanajuato, the ship sailed from the Port of Coatzacoalcos, Veracruz and arrived in Port-au-Prince on June 18, 2008.

== Gallery ==
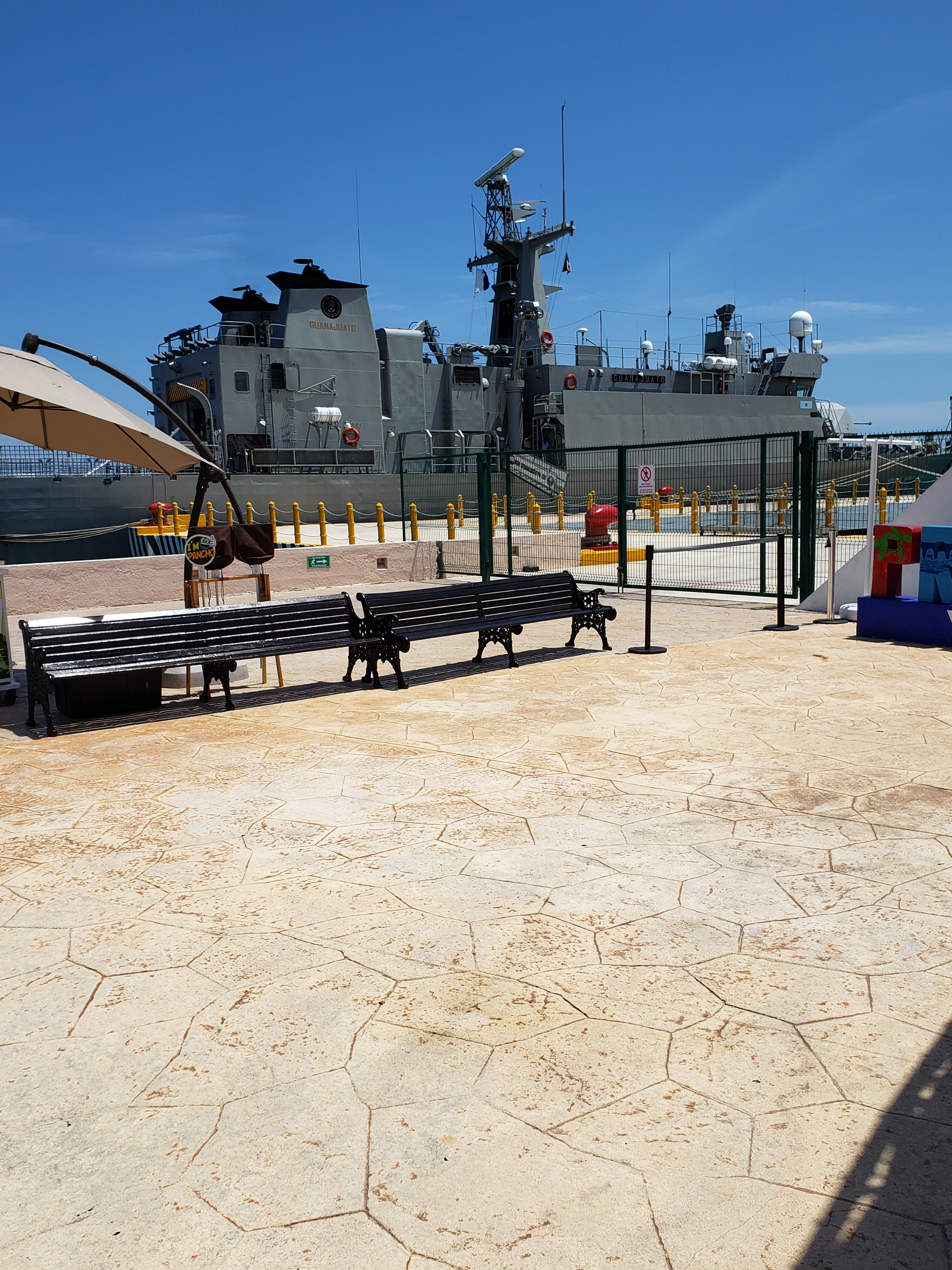

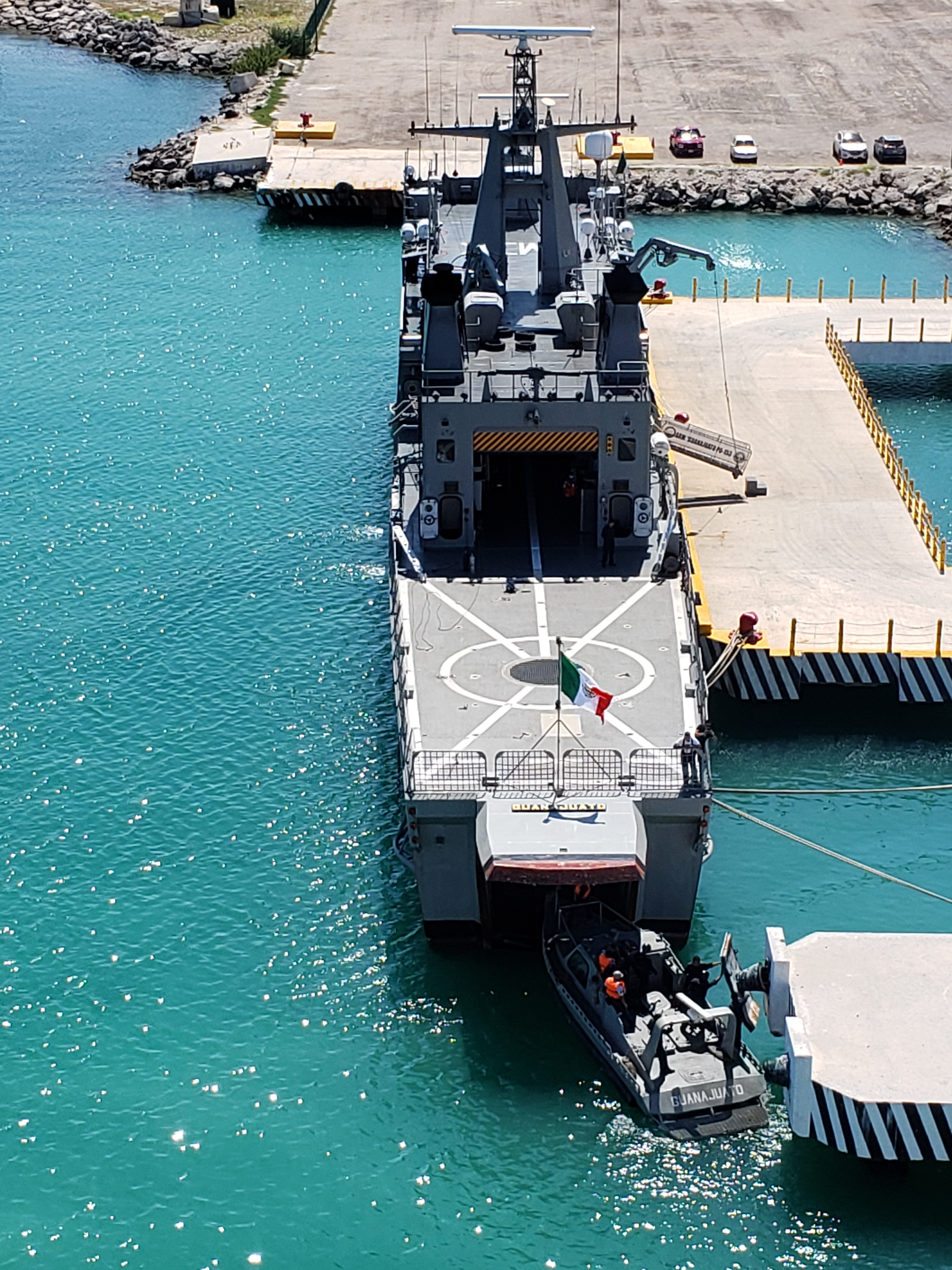
