= Uribe-class patrol vessel =

Group of armed sea vessels

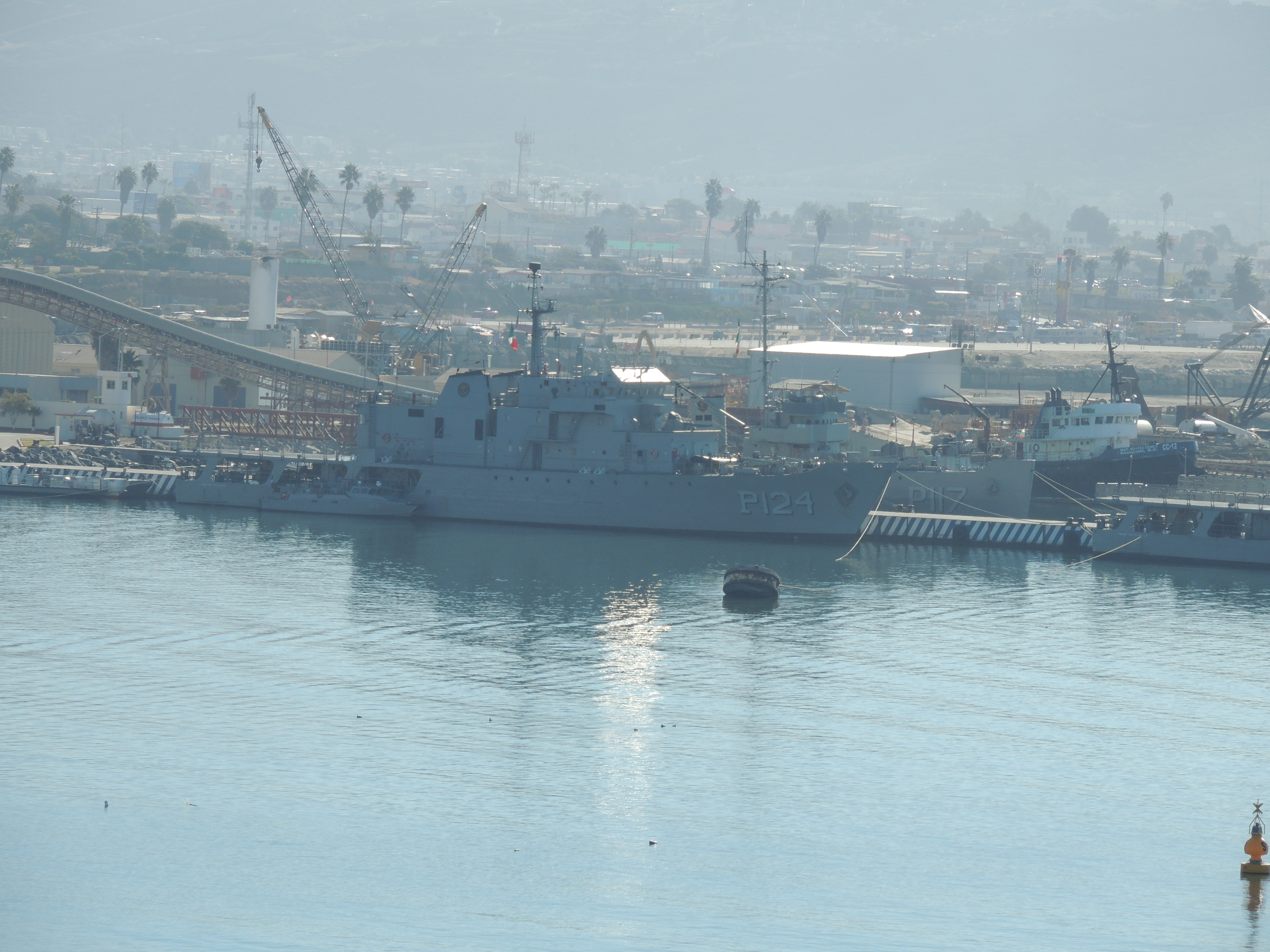
- ARM Bretón

Class overview
- Name: Uribe class
- Builders: Empresa Nacional Bazán
- Operators: Mexican Navy
- Preceded by: Valle class
- Succeeded by: Holzinger class
- Built: 6
- In service: 5
- Active: 5
- Retired: 1

General characteristics
- Type: Offshore patrol vessel
- Displacement: 988 tons (normal load)
- Length: 67 m (220 ft)
- Beam: 10.5 m (34 ft)
- Draught: 3.52 m (11.5 ft)
- Propulsion: 2 Diesel electric drive MTU 20 V. 958TB-92 12,200 hp (9,100 kW)
- Speed: 18.5 knots (34.3 km/h; 21.3 mph)
- Range: 8,000 nmi (15,000 km; 9,200 mi) at 12 kn (22 km/h; 14 mph)
- Complement: 54
- Sensors & processing systems: Optical fire director CSEE Model 74 NAJA; Navigation: Racal Decca Serie 12 Radar. Both Sensor are integrated in the RADOP 30 Fire Control System.
- Armament: 1 × 40 mm L70 Bofors gun
- Aircraft carried: 1 MBB Bo 105 Helicopter
- Aviation facilities: One helicopter hangar and Helipad

Uribe-class patrol vessels are offshore patrol vessels in use by the Mexican Navy.

== Description ==
The class was developed by the Spanish company Empresa Nacional Bazán in 1982. It is a multi-role patrol craft with twin funnels and a helicopter deck. These ships have their main armament, a single 40 mm L70 DP gun, located at 'B' position. Ships of the Uribe class were the first vessels of the Mexican Navy able to operate MBB Bo 105 helicopters on board.

== Ships ==
- ARM Uribe (P121) (1982) – "Sunk off the coast of Rosarito, Mexico to create the first artificial reef in Baja California."
- ARM Azueta (P122) (1982)
- ARM Baranda (P123) (1983)
- ARM Bretón (P124) (1983)
- ARM Blanco (P125) (1983)
- ARM Monasterio (P126) (1983)

== See also ==
- Mantilla-class patrol vessel
