= Guanajuato (disambiguation) =

Guanajuato is a Mexican state.

Guanajuato may also refer to

- Guanajuato, Guanajuato, the capital city of the homonymous state
- Guanajuato River, a river in central Mexico
- Universidad de Guanajuato (in English, the University of Guanajuato), a university based in the Mexican state of Guanajuato
- ARM Guanajuato, ships of the Mexican Navy
- Guanajuato mud turtle (Kinosternon integrum), a species of mud turtle in the family Kinosternidae
