= Durango-class patrol vessel =

Offshore patrol vessel class in the Mexican Navy

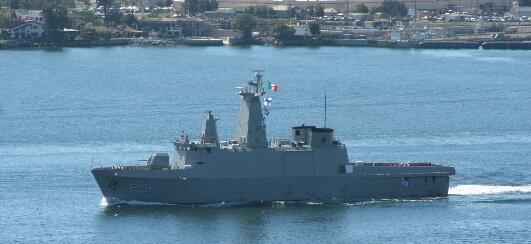
- Durango class

Class overview
- Name: Durango class
- Builders: SEMAR
- Operators: Mexican Navy
- Preceded by: Sierra class
- Succeeded by: Oaxaca class
- Planned: 4
- Completed: 4
- Active: 4

General characteristics
- Type: Patrol vessel
- Displacement: 1,300 long tons (1,300 t) standard; 1,470 long tons (1,490 t) full load
- Length: 81.4 m (267 ft 1 in)
- Beam: 10.5 m (34 ft 5 in)
- Draft: 3.9 m (12 ft 10 in)
- Propulsion: 2 x Caterpillar 3616 diesel engines; 6,197 hp (4,621 kW); 2 shafts
- Speed: 20 knots (37 km/h; 23 mph)
- Complement: 74
- Sensors & processing systems: Saab EOS 450 optronic director; Surface and air search radar
- Armament: Bofors 57 mm/70 caliber gun Mk 3
- Aircraft carried: 1 medium helicopter
- Aviation facilities: One helicopter hangar

The Durango class is an offshore patrol vessel class in service with the Mexican Navy. The Durango class, comprising four ships, was designed and constructed in Mexico in 1999–2000. The class entered service in 2000 and is used primarily for drug interdiction and patrol.

== Description ==
The Durango-class design is based on the Holzinger-class patrol vessels but with a different superstructure. They have a standard displacement of 1,300 long tons (1,300 t) and 1,470 long tons (1,490 t) at full load. The vessels measure 81.4 meters (267 ft 1 in) long with a beam of 10.5 m (34 ft 5 in) and a draft of 3.9 m (12 ft 10 in). The patrol vessels are propelled by two shafts powered by two Caterpillar 3616 V16 diesel engines rated at 6,197 horsepower (4,621 kW). They have a maximum speed of 20 knots (37 km/h; 23 mph). (Note: Jane's Fighting Ships states that the maximum speed is 18 knots (33 km/h; 21 mph).) For electrical power, the Durango class are equipped with two 260 kilowatt generators and one 190 kW generator.

The patrol vessels are armed with a single Bofors 57 mm (2 in)/70 caliber gun Mk 3 mounted forward capable of firing 220 rounds/minute to a range of 17 kilometers (11 mi). The ships mount an Alenia 2 combat data system and Saab EOS 450 optronic director for fire control. They are equipped with air and surface search radar. The Durango class has a complement of 74 including 10 officers with the capability to transport 55 additional personnel. Vessels of the class carry an 11-meter (36 ft) interceptor craft capable of over 50 knots (93 km/h; 58 mph). The vessels also mount a helicopter deck over the stern and a hangar and are capable of operating one medium helicopter.

== Ships ==
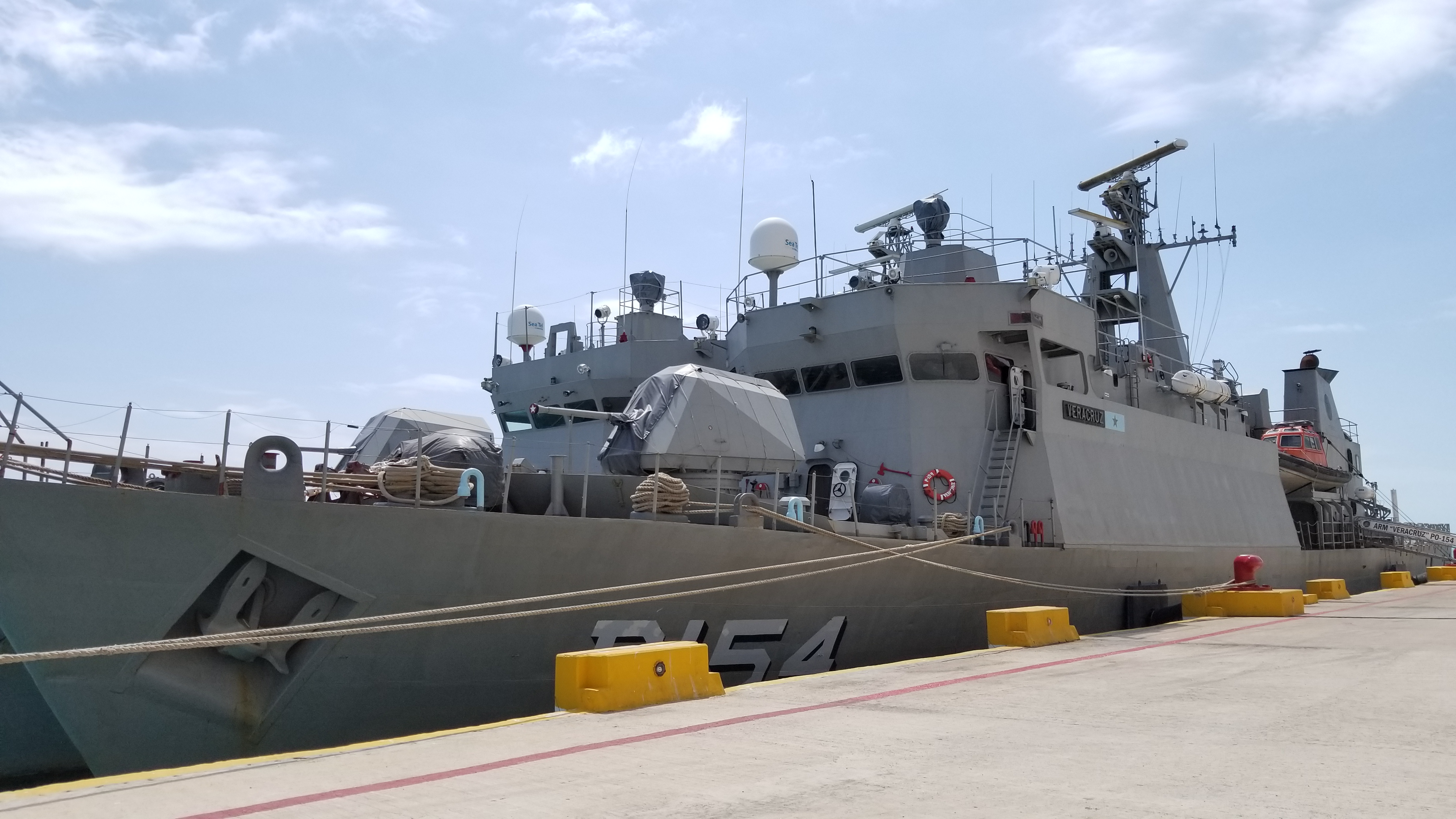
Veracruz (fore) and Guanajuato (rear) at Progreso, Yucatan, Mexico

Durango class
Hull no.	Ship name	Builder	Laid down	Launched	Commissioned	Status
PO-151	Durango	ASTIMAR 1, Tampico, Tamaulipas	18 December 1999	11 September 2000		Active
PO-152	Sonora	ASTIMAR 20, Salina Cruz, Oaxaca	14 December 1999	4 September 2000		Active
PO-153	Guanajuato	ASTIMAR 1, Tampico, Tamaulipas	2000	13 December 2001		Active
PO-154	Veracruz	ASTIMAR 20, Salina Cruz, Oaxaca	4 September 2000	13 December 2001	17 December 2003	Active

== Construction and service ==
The four ships of the class were ordered as a follow on to the Sierra-class corvettes on 1 June 1998. Their design was derived from the Holzinger class and are slightly larger than the Sierra class. Durango and Sonora were based at Guaymas in 2009 and Guanajuato and Veracruz at Coatzacoalcos. The ships are primarily used for drug interdiction and patrol. In 2017 Durango took part in the multi-national naval exercise UNITAS 2017.

== Sources ==
- Saunders, Stephen, ed. (2004). Jane's Fighting Ships 2004–2005 (107 ed.). Alexandria, Virginia: Jane's Information Group Inc. ISBN 0-7106-2623-1.
- Saunders, Stephen, ed. (2009). Jane's Fighting Ships 2009–2010 (112 ed.). Alexandria, Virginia: Jane's Information Group Inc. ISBN 978-0-7106-2888-6.
- "Buque Tipo Patrulla Oceanica Clase "Durango"" [Oceanic Patrol Vessel Class "Durango"]. Secretaria de Marina Mexico (in Spanish).
