= Sierra-class corvette =

Corvettes of the Mexican Navy

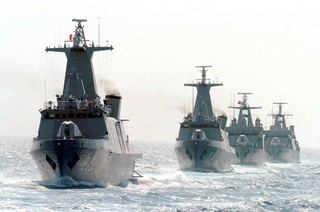
- Four Sierra-class corvettes

Class overview
- Name: Sierra class
- Builders: Tampico Naval Shipyard; Salina Cruz Naval Shipyard
- Operators: Mexican Navy
- Preceded by: Holzinger class
- Succeeded by: Durango class
- Built: 1998–1999
- Planned: 4
- Completed: 4
- Active: 3
- Retired: 1

General characteristics
- Type: Corvette
- Displacement: 1,366 t (1,344 long tons) full load
- Length: 70.4 m (231 ft 0 in)
- Beam: 10.5 m (34 ft 5 in)
- Draught: 2.8 m (9 ft 2 in)
- Propulsion: 2 diesel Caterpillar 3616 V16 12,394 bhp (9,242 kW)
- Speed: 18 knots (33 km/h; 21 mph)
- Complement: 76
- Sensors & processing systems: Fire control system: Saab EOS 450 optronic director; Surface/air search radar E/F and I-bands; Alenia 2 combat data system
- Armament: 1 Bofors 57 mm gun Mk 3; SA-N-10 surface-to-air missile (Matias Romero only)
- Aircraft carried: 1 × MBB Bo 105C helicopter
- Aviation facilities: One helicopter hangar and helipad

The Sierra-class corvettes are corvettes of the Mexican Navy intended mainly for interception of drug smugglers, exclusive economic zone (EEZ) patrol, and countering terrorism. The class comprises four ships with the lead ship ARM Sierra (Note: ARM stands for Armada de la Republica Mexicana) commissioned by the Mexican Navy in 1998. One ship, ARM Benito Juárez, was sunk as a target ship in 2007 after being wrecked by fire in 2003. The other three vessels remain in service.

== Design and development ==
Originally, this project was designated Holzinger 2000 because it is a further development of the Holzinger-class ships introduced in the early 1990s. The Sierra class has a different superstructure than the preceding Holzinger class. The Sierra class as built had a full load displacement of 1,366 tonnes (1,344 long tons) and measured 70.4 metres (231 ft 0 in) long with a beam of 10.5 m (34 ft 5 in) and a draught of 2.8 m (9 ft 2 in). According to the Mexican Navy, the vessels have a length of 75.15 metres (246 ft 7 in), a beam of 10.5 m (34 ft 5 in), a draught of 3.18 m (10 ft 5 in) and a normal displacement of 950 t (930 long tons). The corvettes are powered by two Caterpillar 3616 V16 diesel engines turning two shafts creating 9,242 kilowatts (12,394 bhp) total. This gave the vessels a speed of 18 knots (33 km/h; 21 mph) or 23 knots (43 km/h; 26 mph). The vessels have two 260 kW (350 hp) and one 190 kW (250 hp) generators for power production.

The Sierra class mount a Saab EOS 450 optronic director for fire control, and radars operating on the E/F and I-bands for navigation, surface and air search. They are equipped with the Alenia 2 combat data system. These ships have an aft flight deck and hangar for one MBB Bo 105C helicopter. The corvettes are armed with one 57-millimetre (2.2 in) Mk3 naval gun on the fore deck to engage air and surface targets. The 57 mm gun is capable of firing 220 rounds per minute to a distance of 17 kilometres (9.2 nmi; 11 mi). Matias Romero alone is also equipped with an SA-N-10 surface-to-air missile with a range of 5 kilometres (2.7 nmi; 3.1 mi). The ships carry an 11 m (36 ft) interceptor craft capable of 50 knots (93 km/h; 58 mph). The corvettes have a complement of 75 including 10 officers.

== Construction and career ==
Four vessels were ordered by the Mexican Navy in 1997 from shipyards in Tampico and Salina Cruz. The lead ship Justo Sierra Mendez (shortened to Sierra by the Mexican Navy) was commissioned on 1 June 1999 and the last, Guillermo Prieto (shortened to Prieto) on 17 September 1999. (Note: Commissioning dates vary widely between the sources. The official website of the Mexican Navy, SEMAR, states that Sierra was commissioned on 1 June 1999, Prieto on 18 September 1999 and Romero on 17 September 1999 and none for Juárez. Saunders 2009 version of Jane's Fighting Ships has the commissioning dates as Sierra on 1 June 1998 with the other two the same. Saunders 2004 version of Jane's Fighting Ships has the dates 1 June 1999 for Sierra and Juárez and 21 April 2000 for Prieto and Romero.)

On 24 October 2003 a fire broke out aboard Juárez while operating in the Gulf of Mexico. The fire quickly engulfed the ship, leading to the crew abandoning ship. The fire was brought under control with the aid of the Petróleos Mexicanos (PEMEX) tugboat Avila Karisma and the Mexican Navy vessels ARM Sierra, Durango and Sonora while the crew were evacuated to Mexican naval facilities in Ciudad del Carmén, Campeche. To allow for the corvette to be towed, the heat on the deck had to be reduced. Instructed by a PEMEX specialist firefighter, the vessels coordinated their efforts and brought the temperature down enough for the PEMEX tugboat Adee Tide II to begin towing operations on 25 October and brought the vessel to Dos Bocas, Tabasco. Juárez was decommissioned and used as a target ship in July 2007.

== Ships in class ==
Sierra-class corvette construction data
Name	Hull number	Builder	Laid down	Launched	Commissioned	Status
Sierra (aka Justo Sierra Mendez)	PO 141 (ex-C 2001)	Tampico Shipyard, Tampico, Tamaulipas	19 January 1998	1 June 1998	1 June 1999 (Note: Alternatively given as 1 June 1998)	Active
Benito Juárez (aka Juárez)	PO 142 (ex-C 2002)	Salina Cruz Shipyard, Salina Cruz, Oaxaca	19 January 1998	23 July 1998	1 June 1999	Taken out of service after a fire incident in 2003. Sunk as a target ship in 2007.
Prieto (aka Guillermo Prieto)	PO 143 (ex-C 2003)	Tampico Shipyard, Tampico, Tamaulipas	1 June 1998	18 September 1999	18 September 1999 (Note: Alternatively given as 21 April 2000.)	Active
Romero (aka Matias Romero)	PO 144 (ex-C 2004)	Salina Cruz Shipyard, Salina Cruz, Oaxaca	23 July 1998	17 September 1999	17 September 1999 (Note: Alternatively given as 21 April 2000.)	Active
