= Secretary of The Navy Shipyards =

Mexican government office

The Astilleros de la Secretaría de Marina (Mexican Secretary of The Navy Shipyards), are also known as ASTIMAR. The yards are dependent on the Mexican General Directorate of Naval Construction of the Mexican Navy, which carries out various types of naval construction and repairs in the Mexican territory.

== Facilities ==
These yards have five facilities:

- In the Gulf of Mexico
  - Shipyard Marina 1 (ASTIMAR 1) in Tampico, Tamaulipas
  - Shipyard Marina 3 (ASTIMAR 3) in Coatzacoalcos, Veracruz
- In the Pacific Ocean
  - Shipyard Marina 6 (ASTIMAR 6) in Guaymas, Sonora
  - Shipyard Marina 18 (ASTIMAR 18) in Acapulco, Guerrero
  - Shipyard Marina 20 (ASTIMAR 20) in Salina Cruz, Oaxaca

The construction of the Ocean Patrol Vessels (OPV) are being carried out in the yards No. 1 and 20 in Salina Cruz and Tampico, respectively, where other 14 ships that make up the Holzinger, Sierra, Durango and Oaxaca Class ships were previously built. Since 2008, two more Oaxaca Class patrols are being built, and are expected to be commissioned in 2010.

== Ships built ==
- Holzinger Class
- Sierra class
- Durango class
- Oaxaca class
- Tenochtitlan class
- Isla Madre class
- Polaris class
- Reformador class
- Montes Azules-class logistics ship

== Pending projects ==
By 2009 the Navy Shipyards have several projects without resource allocation in the budget expenditure of the Federation:

- In 2009 the Navy Shipyards will be building two more Oaxaca Class ships, hull number 40 and 86 in yards in 1 and 20.
  - On July 23, 2009. The naval shipyards launched the ARM Independencia (Independence). It's expected to enter service in June 2010.
  - On November 23, 2009. The naval shipyards launched the ARM Revolución (Revolution). It's expected to enter service in November 2010.
- Construction of five 75 tons vessels for territorial sea surveillance.

== Canceled projects ==
The Bulom Project of the Mexican ASTIMAR was to build a national design that could be used as a ship or an amphibious multipurpose logistics support ship. Its intended displacement was planned to be on the order of 4500–5000 tons and could carry up to 200 troops plus a crew of 63 sailors, but it was canceled due to lack of funds from the Ministry of the Navy.
