= Holzinger-class patrol vessel =

Class of Mexican offshore patrol vessels

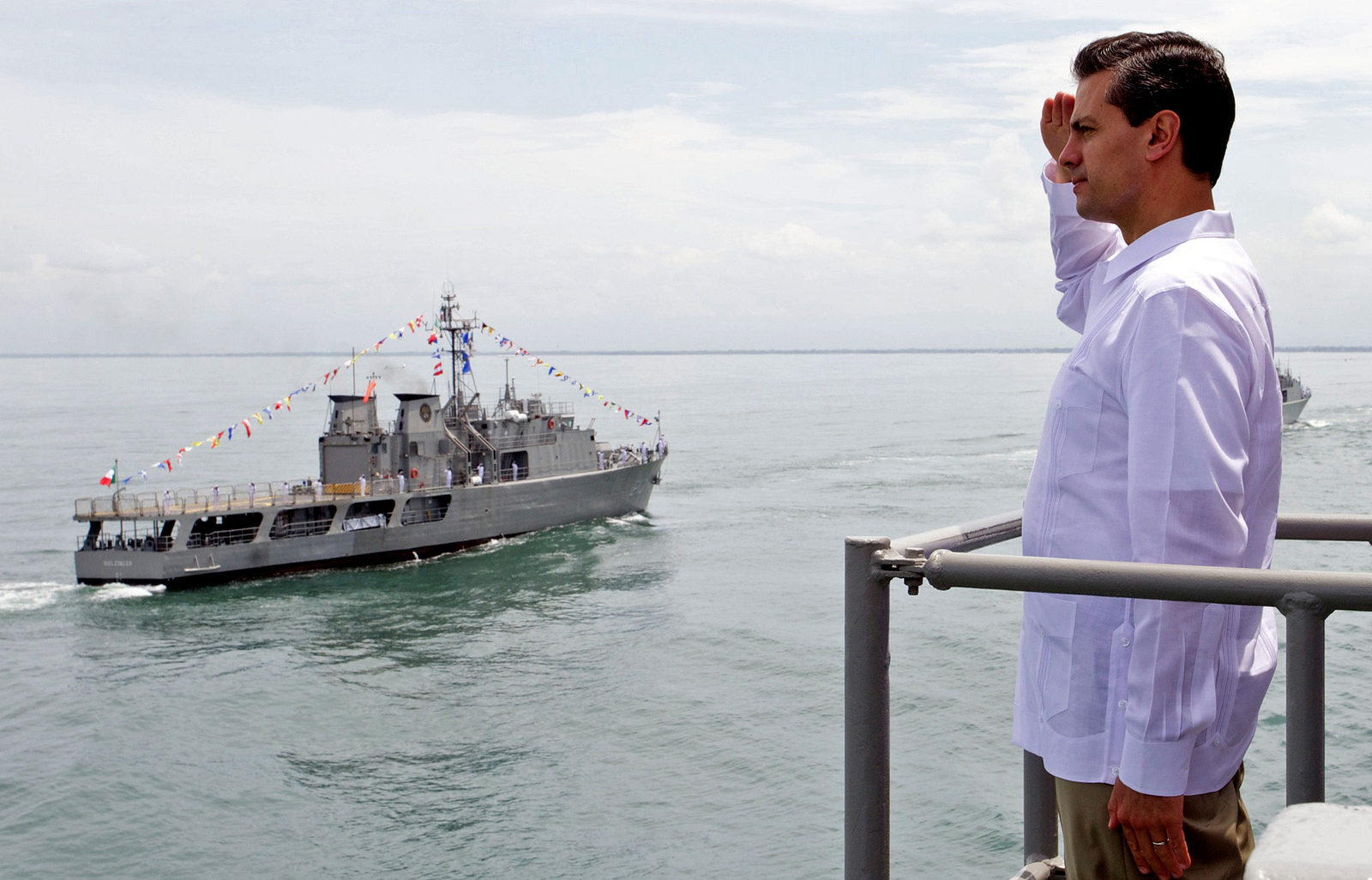
- ARM Holzinger (PO-131)

Class overview
- Name: Holzinger class
- Builders: Tampico Naval Shipyard and Salina Cruz Naval Ship Yard
- Operators: Mexican Navy
- Preceded by: Uribe class
- Succeeded by: Sierra class
- Built: 4
- In service: 4
- Active: 4

General characteristics
- Type: Offshore patrol vessel
- Displacement: 1022 tons (full load)
- Length: 74.4 m (244 ft)
- Beam: 10.5 m (34 ft)
- Draught: 3.18 m (10.4 ft)
- Propulsion: 2 Diesel electric drive MTU 20 V. 958TB-92 13,320 bhp (9,930 kW)
- Speed: 22 knots (41 km/h; 25 mph)
- Range: 3,830 nmi (7,090 km; 4,410 mi)
- Endurance: 20 days
- Complement: 73
- Sensors & processing systems: 2 Navigation Radars Raytheon SPS-64 (V)6A
- Armament: 2 Bofors L60 40 mm AA. They are on a US MK 1 water-cooled twin mount.
- Aircraft carried: 1 MBB Bo 105 Helicopter
- Aviation facilities: One helicopter hangar and helipad

Holzinger-class patrol vessels are offshore patrol vessels in service with the Mexican Navy. They are a Mexican design, based on the Uribe class developed by the Spanish Naval Company Empresa Nacional Bazán in 1982. Holzinger-class patrol vessels have a smaller helicopter deck than the Uribe class and have main armaments (two twin US MK1 Bofors 40 mm AA mounts) at 'A' position. They are able to operate MBB Bo 105 helicopters on board.

Uribe-class ships were the first medium size vessels built by the Mexican Navy. Two first hulls were built at Tampico Naval Shipyard (Tamaulipas); the second two hulls were built at Salina Cruz Naval Shipyard (Oaxaca).

== Ships ==
- ARM Holzinger (PO 131) (1991)
- ARM Godínez (PO 132) (1991)
- ARM De la Vega (PO 133) (1994)
- ARM Berriozabal (PO 134) (1994)
