= Mexican Navy =

Maritime warfare branch of Mexico's military

- Armada de México (Spanish)
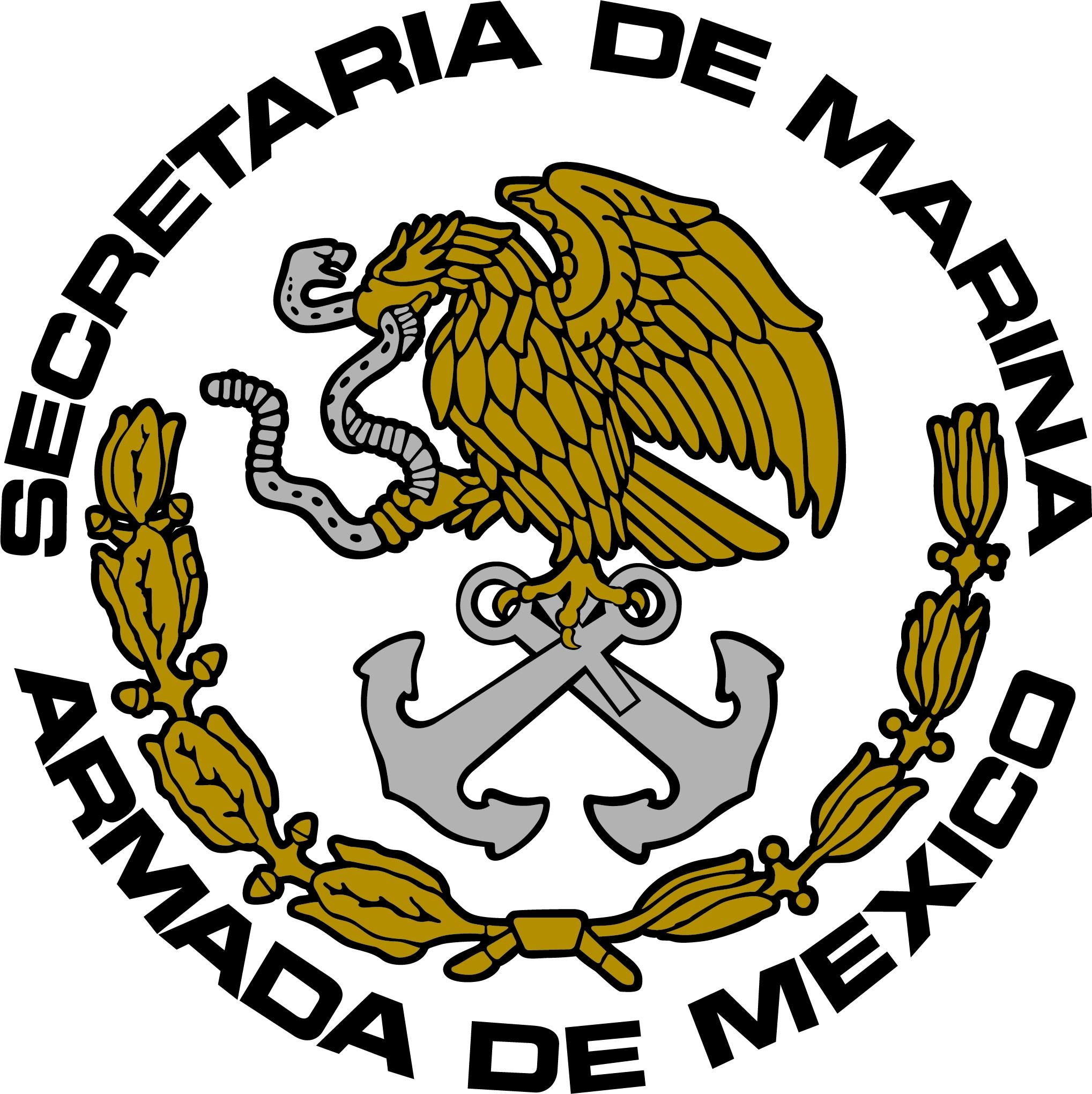
- Seal of the Mexican Navy
- Founded: October 4, 1821; 205 years ago
- Country: Mexico
- Type: Navy
- Role: Naval warfare
- Size: 92,043 personnel (2025)
- Part of: Mexican Armed Forces; Secretariat of the Navy
- Mottos: En el mar, en el aire, en la tierra (At sea, in the air, on land)
- Anniversaries: June 1, National Navy Day
- Engagements: Spanish attempts to reconquer Mexico; Texan–Mexican Wars; Invasion of Yucatan; Mexican–American War; Caste War of Yucatan; Mexican Revolution; World War II; Mexican drug war

Commanders
- Commander-in-chief: President Claudia Sheinbaum
- Secretary of the Navy: Admiral Raymundo Pedro Morales Ángeles
- Notable commanders: Pedro Sáinz de Baranda y Borreiro; David Porter; Orhón P. Blanco; Ángel Ortiz Monasterio

Insignia
- Naval jack

The Mexican Navy (Spanish: Armada de México) is the maritime service branch of the Mexican Armed Forces. The Secretariat of the Navy is in charge of administration of the navy. The commander of the navy is the Secretary of the Navy, who is both a cabinet minister and a career naval officer.

The Mexican Navy's stated mission is "to use the naval force of the federation for external defense, and to help with internal order". As of 2020, the Navy consisted of about 68,200 personnel plus reserves, over 189 ships, and about 130 aircraft. The Navy attempts to maintain a constant modernization program to upgrade its response capability.

Given Mexico's large area of water (3,149,920 km^{2} (1,216,190 sq mi)) and extensive coastline (11,122 km (6,911 mi)), the Navy's duties are of great importance. Perhaps its most important on-going missions are fighting the Mexican drug war, which includes protecting Pemex's oil wells in Campeche in the Gulf of Mexico. Another important task of the Mexican Navy is to help people in hurricane relief operations and other natural disasters.

The Mexican navy is the second largest navy in Latin America and North America, and the third largest in the Americas after the United States and Brazil.

== History ==
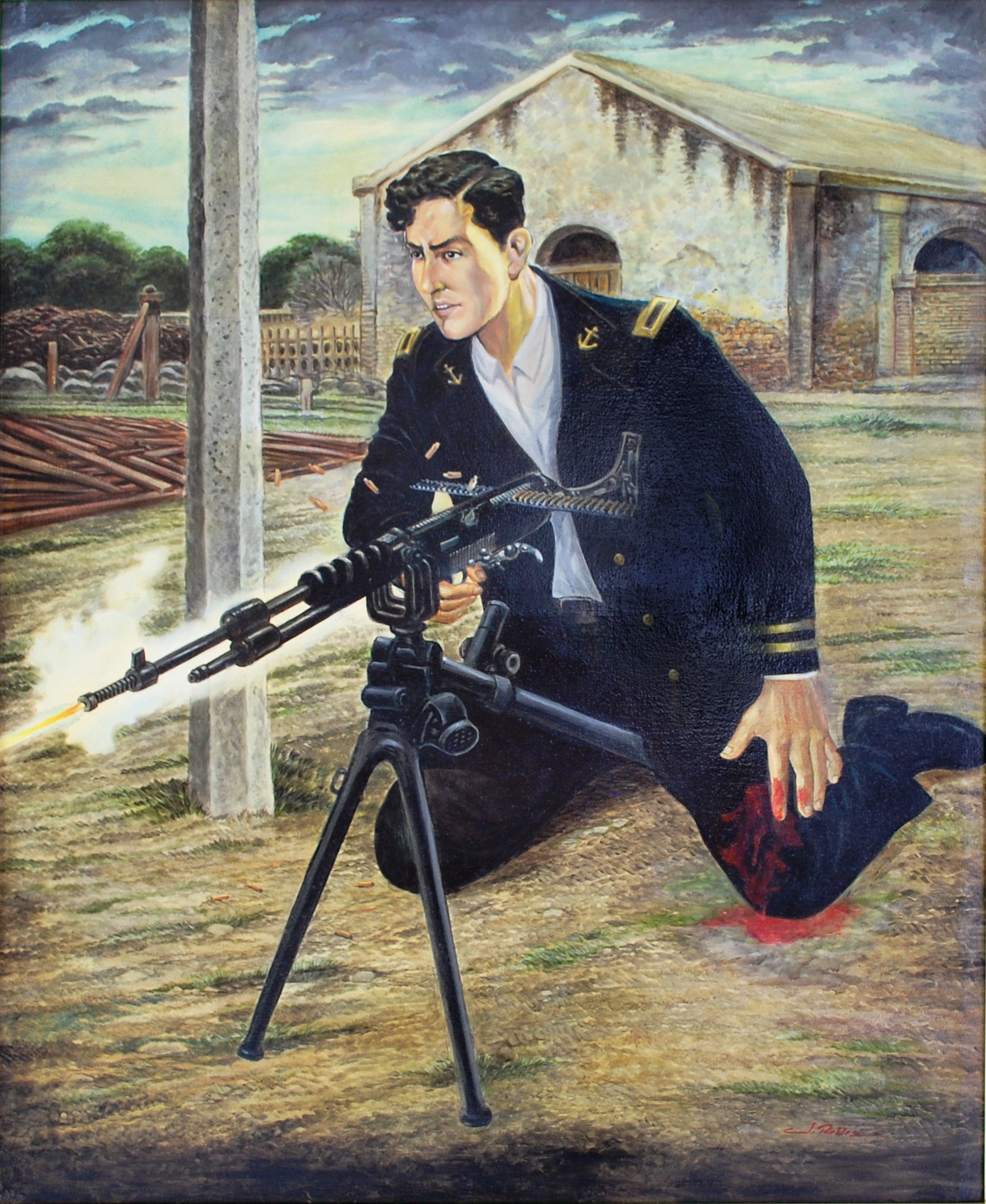
Depiction of Mexican Navy Lieutenant José Azueta firing a French Hotchkiss machine gun in the defense of Veracruz during the Second U.S. intervention of the Mexican Revolution, painting at the Naval Historical Museum in Mexico City

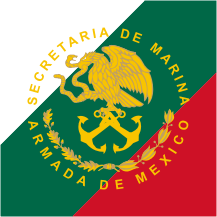
Mexico's naval jack from 1994 to 2000

The Mexican Navy has its origins in the creation of the Ministry of War in 1821. From that year until 1939 it existed jointly with the Mexican Army in the organic ministry. Since its declaration of independence from Spain in September 1810, through the mid decades of the 19th century, Mexico found itself in a constant state of war, mostly against Spain which had not recognized its independence. Therefore, its priority was to purchase its first fleet from the U.S. to displace the last remaining Spanish forces from its coasts.

The Mexican Navy has participated in many naval battles to protect and defend Mexico's interests. Some of the most important battles were:

Attempts by Spain to reconquer Mexico

- Takeover of the San Juan de Ulúa fort (1821–1825)
- The invasion of Cabo Rojo (1829)
- Battle of Mariel (February, 1828)

The first French intervention in Mexico (The 'Pastry War') (November 1838 – March 1839)

- An entire Armada was captured at Veracruz

Texan Independence (1836–1845)

- Texas Navy

Yucatán Independence (1841–1848)

- Naval Battle of Campeche

The Mexican–American War (1846–1848)
The Second French Intervention (1862–1867)
The Mexican Revolution (1910–1919)

- First Battle of Topolobampo
- Second Battle of Topolobampo
- Third Battle of Topolobampo
- Tampico Affair
- Fourth Battle of Topolobampo

Second invasion by the United States (April 9, 1914 – November 23, 1914)

- United States occupation of Veracruz

=== Historical ships ===
- Schooner Anáhuac
- Schooner Iguala
- Cutter Campechana
- Cutter Chalco
- Cutter Chapala
- Cutter Orizaba
- Cutter Texcoco
- Cutter Zumpango
- Cutter Papaloapan
- Cutter Tampico
- Cutter Tlaxcalteca
- Cutter Tuxpan
- Ship Congreso Mexicano (previously called Asia and San Jerónimo)
- Brigantine Constante
- Brigantine Vicente Guerrero
- Steamer paddle frigate Guadalupe
- Steamer paddle frigate Montezuma
- Steamer gunboat Libertad
- Steamer gunboat Independencia
- Steamer Guerra Demócrata
- Steam yacht Orizaba
- Gunboat Democráta
- Gunboat México
- Corvette Zaragoza
- School ship Yucatán
- Pontoon Chetumal
- Gunboat Tampico
- Gunboat Veracruz
- Gunboat Nicolás Bravo
- Transport vessel Progreso
- Transport Vicente Guerrero
- Gunboat Agua Prieta
- Coastal defence Battleship Anáhuac
- Auxiliary ship Zaragoza II
- School ship Velero Cuauhtémoc

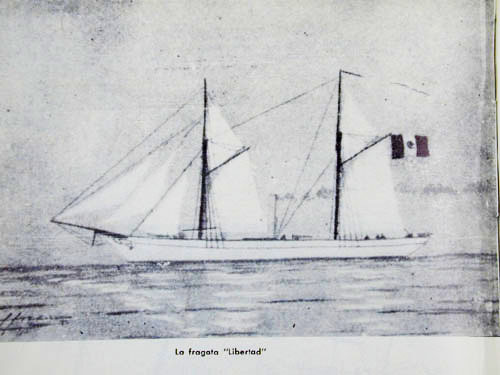
Mexican Navy gunboat Libertad in the 1870s

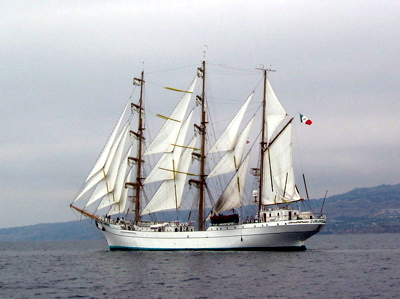
Mexican Navy training ship Cuauhtemoc in 2005

== Organization ==
The President of Mexico is commander in chief of all military forces. Day-to-day control of the Navy lies with the Navy Secretary, José Rafael Ojeda Durán. In Mexico there is no joint force command structure with the army, so the Secretary reports directly to the President. The Navy has a General Headquarters and three naval forces. There are furthermore eight regions (four on the Pacific coast, three on the Mexican Gulf coast and the Región Naval Central, grouping the naval forces, based in and around the capital Mexico City, such as the 7th Naval Infantry Brigade, the Central Special Operations Group and the Air Transport Squadron), thirteen zones, and fourteen naval sectors.

The Navy is divided into three main services designated as "forces":

- Gulf and Caribbean Sea Naval Force
- Pacific Naval Force
- Naval Infantry Force

Other notable services include:

- Naval Aviation
- Search and Rescue

Officers are trained at the Mexican Naval Academy, called the "Heroica Escuela Naval Militar" ("Heroic Military Naval School"), located in Antón Lizardo, Veracruz.

Mexican Naval Infantry Marines insignia

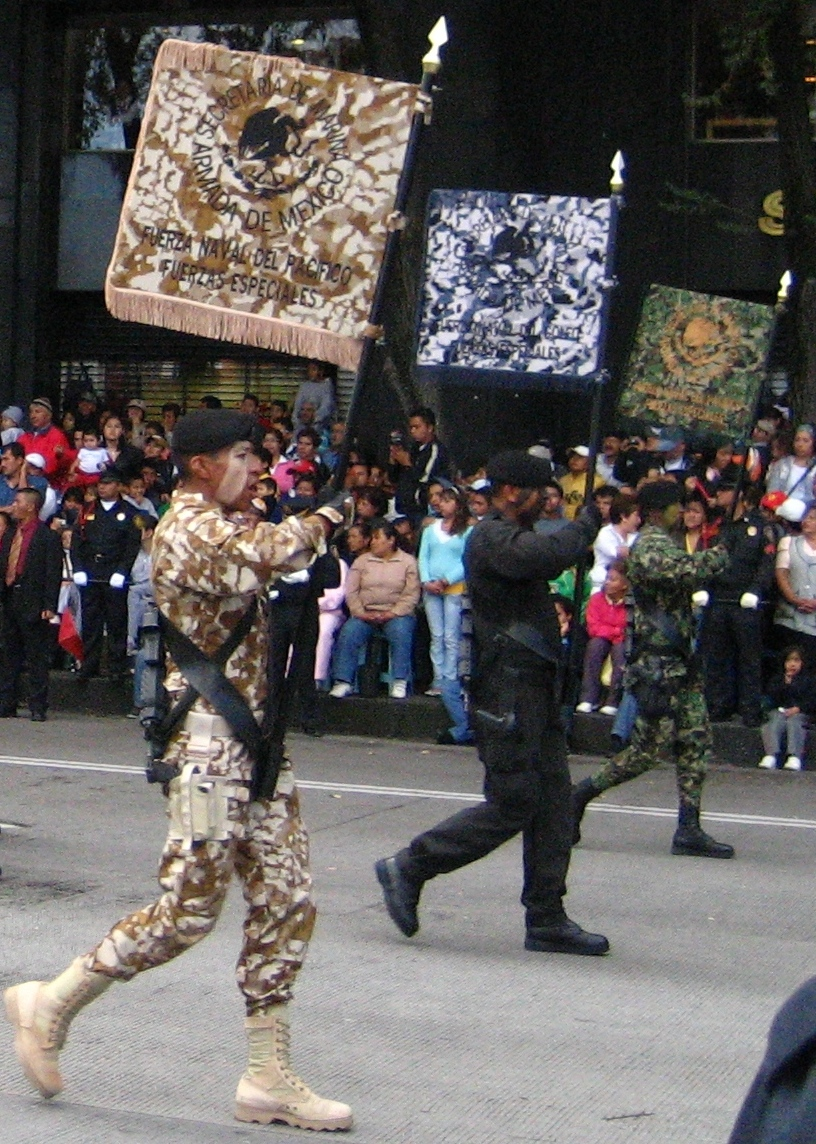
Mexican marines displaying three different camouflage patterns used by the Mexican marine corps.

=== Naval Infantry ===
The Mexican Naval Infantry Corps was reorganized in 2007–2009 into 30 Naval Infantry Battalions (Batallones de Infantería de Marina – BIM), a paratroop battalion, a battalion attached to the Presidential Guard Brigade, two Fast Reaction Forces with six battalions each, and three Special Forces groups. The Naval Infantry are responsible for port security, protection of the ten-kilometer coastal fringe, and patrolling major waterways.

The Naval Infantry also is responsible for 23 National Service Training Units under the responsibility of the Navy Secretary, enforcing the National Service obligation for Mexicans of teenage and young adult age.

=== Search and rescue units ===
In 2008, the Mexican Navy created its new search and rescue system, allocated in strategic ports at Pacific and Gulf of Mexico ports, to provide assistance to any ships which are in jeopardy or at risk due to mechanical failure, weather conditions or life risk to the crew. To provide such support, the Navy has ordered Coast Guard Defender class ships (two per station, and one 47-Foot Motor Lifeboat coast guard vessel). Other stations will be provided only with Defender-class boats.

=== Maritime role ===
On April 1, 2014, SEMAR officially announced the creation of Port Protection Naval Units (Unidades Navales de Protección Portuaria: UNAPROP) which will include a marine section. The main task of UNAPROPs is to ensure maritime surveillance and inspection.

== Training and education ==
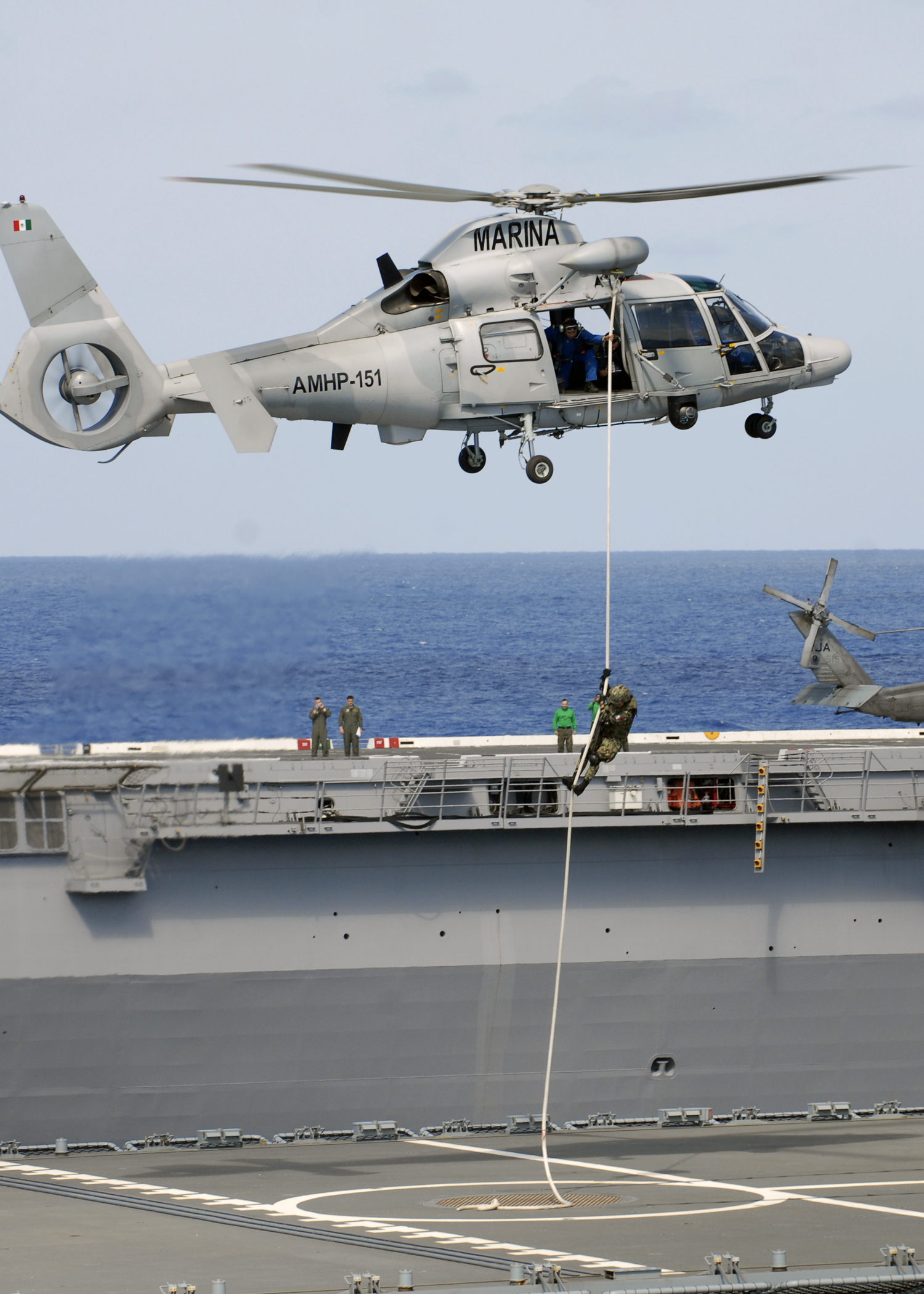
A Mexican marine fast-ropes onto the flight deck of the German support ship Frankfurt Am Main during a simulated multi-national maritime interdiction operation

Roundel of Mexico Naval Aviation insignia

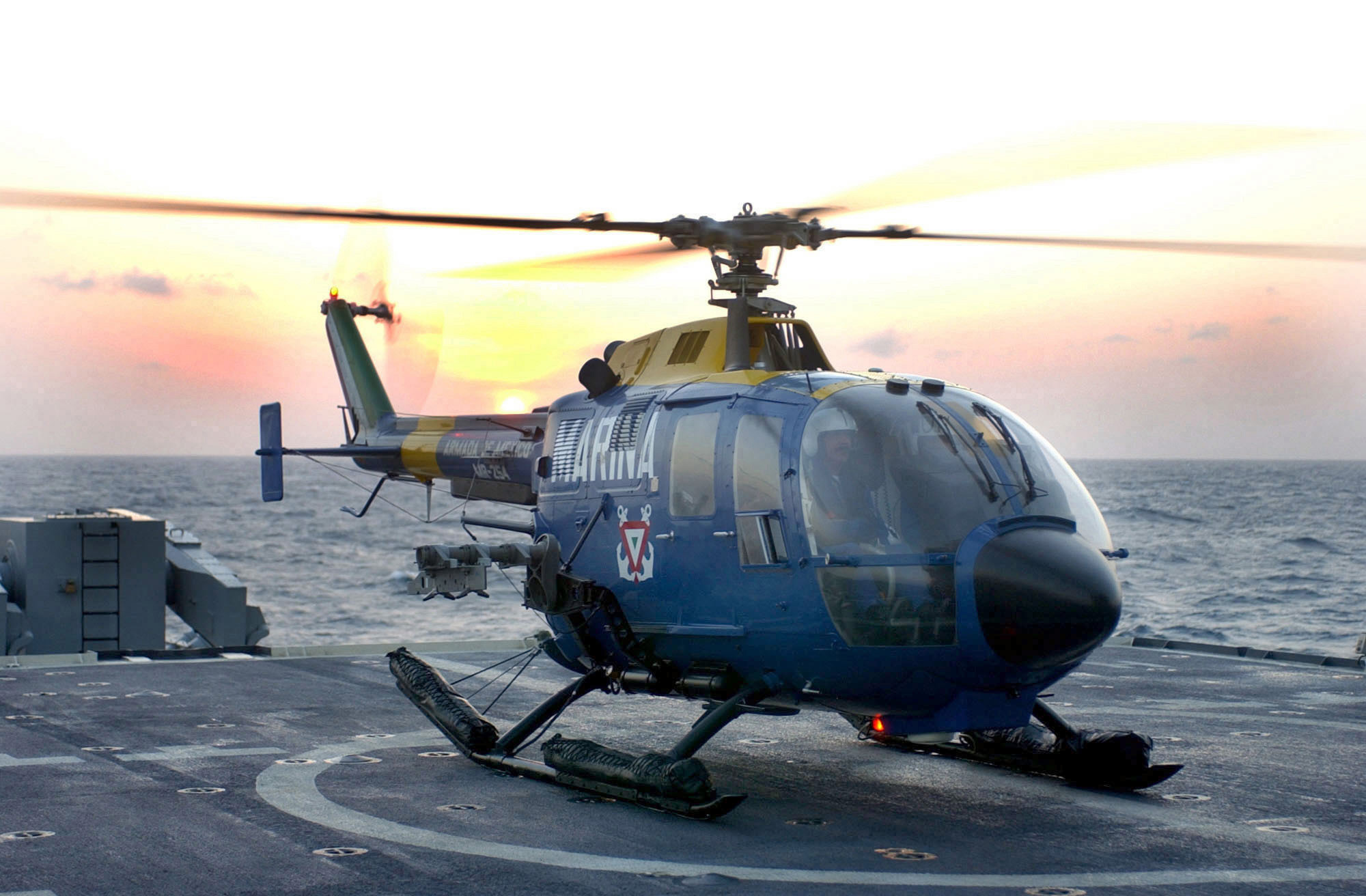
A Mexican Naval Aviation BO-105 helicopter

The Navy offers several options for graduate studies in their educational institutions:

Heroica Escuela Naval Militar

It is the school where future officers are trained for the General Corps of the Navy. Candidates can enter upon completing high school. Upon completion of studies, graduates obtain the degree of Sub-Lieutenant and the title of Naval Science Engineer.

Naval Medical School

This school Located in Mexico City, offers a career in medicine. Officers are trained with skills for the prevention and health care of naval personnel. By adopting a professional examination, graduates are commissioned Sub-Lieutenants.

Naval Engineering School

In the Naval Engineering School, officers are responsible for the preventive and corrective maintenance of systems and electronic equipment installed on ships and installations of the Mexican Navy. This school offers career of Electronic Engineering and Naval Communications. It is located between the town of Mata Grape and Anton Lizardo, 32 km (20 mi) from the port of Veracruz.

Naval Nursing School

Here the time to achieve a nursing degree lasts eight semesters. Officers are trained with the knowledge and skills necessary to enable them to assist medical personnel in caring for patients in hospitals, sanatoriums, clinics, health sections on land, aboard ships and at The Naval Medical Center.

Naval Aviation School

The Naval Aviation School trains pilots for the Mexican Naval Aviation as well as National Guard aviators and Naval personnel from various countries of Central America. This school is located on La Paz, Baja California Sur.

Search, Rescue and Diving School

Located in Acapulco, members of The Navy are trained for marine search, rescue and diving. It also trains state police officers and firefighters.

== Rank insignia ==
=== Commissioned officer ranks ===
The rank insignia of commissioned officers.

Rank group	General / flag officers				Senior officers			Junior officers
Mexican Navy
Mexican Navy	Secretario de Marina	Almirante	Vicealmirante	Contraalmirante	Capitán de navío	Capitán de fragata	Capitán de corbeta	Teniente de navio	Teniente de fragata	Teniente de corbeta	Guardiamarina

=== Other ranks ===
The rank insignia of non-commissioned officers and enlisted personnel.

Rank group	Senior NCOs		Junior NCOs	Enlisted
Mexican Navy
Mexican Navy	Segundo maestre	Tercer maestre	Cabo	Marinero

== Modernization and budget ==
The annual Navy's budget is in a one to three proportion of the national budget relative to the Mexican Army and Mexican Air Force. The Navy has a reputation for being well-run and well-organized. This reputation allows for a close relationship with the United States Navy (USN), as evidenced by the procurement of numerous former USN ships.

=== Ships ===
The Secretary of the Navy, Admiral Mariano Francisco Saynez Mendoza, announced on October 1, 2007, detailed plans to upgrade and modernize the country's naval capabilities. On the following day, La Jornada newspaper from Mexico City, disclosed the Mexican Navy plans, which are among others, to build six offshore patrol vessels (OPVs) with a length of 86 metres (282 ft), 1,680 tons and each housing a Eurocopter Panther helicopter as well as small high-speed interception boats. The budget for this project is above US$200 million.

Another project is to build 12 CB 90 HMN high speed (50 knots (93 km/h; 58 mph)) interception boats under license from a Swedish boat company Dockstavarvet to the Mexican Navy. Also, a number of fully equipped planes for surveillance and maritime patrol are being considered. Combinations of options and development are being defined.

==== Shipbuilding ====
The Mexican Navy depends upon their naval shipyards for construction and repairs of their ships. There are five shipyards located in the Gulf of Mexico and Pacific Ocean:

- Gulf of Mexico
  - Naval shipyard 1 (ASTIMAR 1) – Tampico, Tamaulipas
  - Naval shipyard 3 (ASTIMAR 3) – Coatzacoalcos, Veracruz
- Pacific Ocean
  - Naval shipyard 6 (ASTIMAR 6) – Guaymas, Sonora
  - Naval shipyard 18 (ASTIMAR 18) – Acapulco, Guerrero
  - Naval shipyard 20 (ASTIMAR 20) – Salina Cruz, Oaxaca

=== Missiles ===
The Mexican Navy initiated studies to develop and construct its first missile, according to a May 2005 interview with the undersecretary of the Navy, Armando Sanchez, the missile was to have an average range of 12 to 15 kilometres (7.5 to 9.3 mi) and be able to target enemy ships and aircraft. The undersecretary added that they already had the solid propellant, and the basic design of the missile. All aspects relative to their fuselage were solved as well as the launch platforms. The Mexican Navy was developing the software to direct the missile to its target. In July 2008, the project was reported to be 80% complete. Despite this effort, the missile development was canceled in 2009 due to "problems with the propulsion system".

=== Radar modernization ===
In 2009, the Mexican Navy began operating a batch of new MPQ-64 Sentinel radars in the oil-rich Gulf of Mexico. The radar network was installed in 2007 for a trial phase while military personnel were trained to get familiar with the system. The new installations will work together with combat surface vessels that patrol the area.

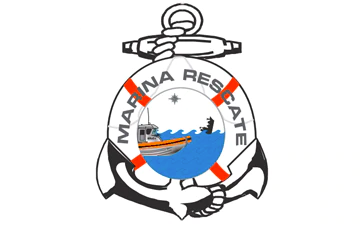
Mexican Navy Maritime search and rescue unit flag

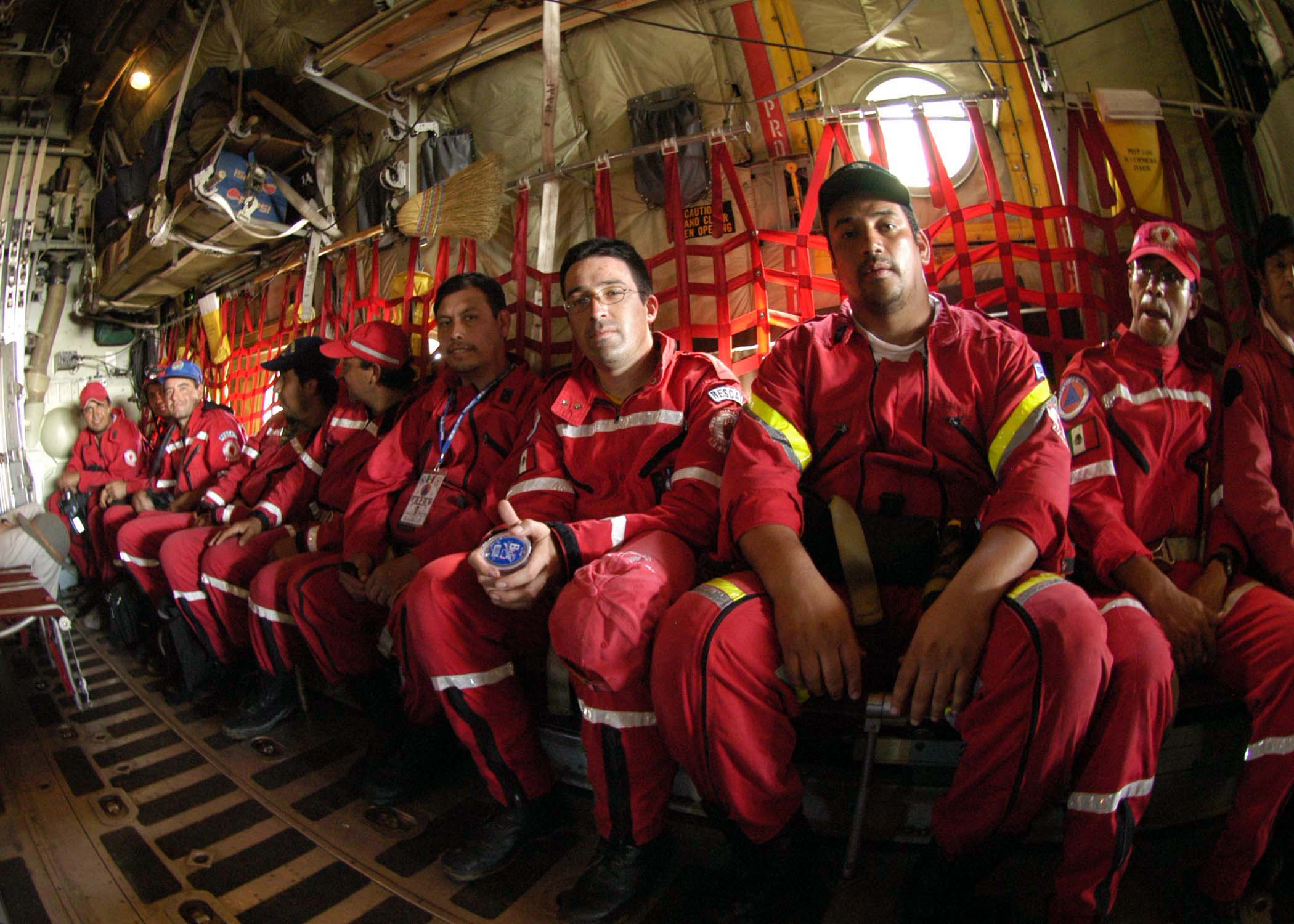
A Mexican Navy Maritime search and rescue team departs on a Royal Australian Air Force C-130H Hercules transport plane in Indonesia en route to Thailand to help survivors of the tsunami disaster in 2005

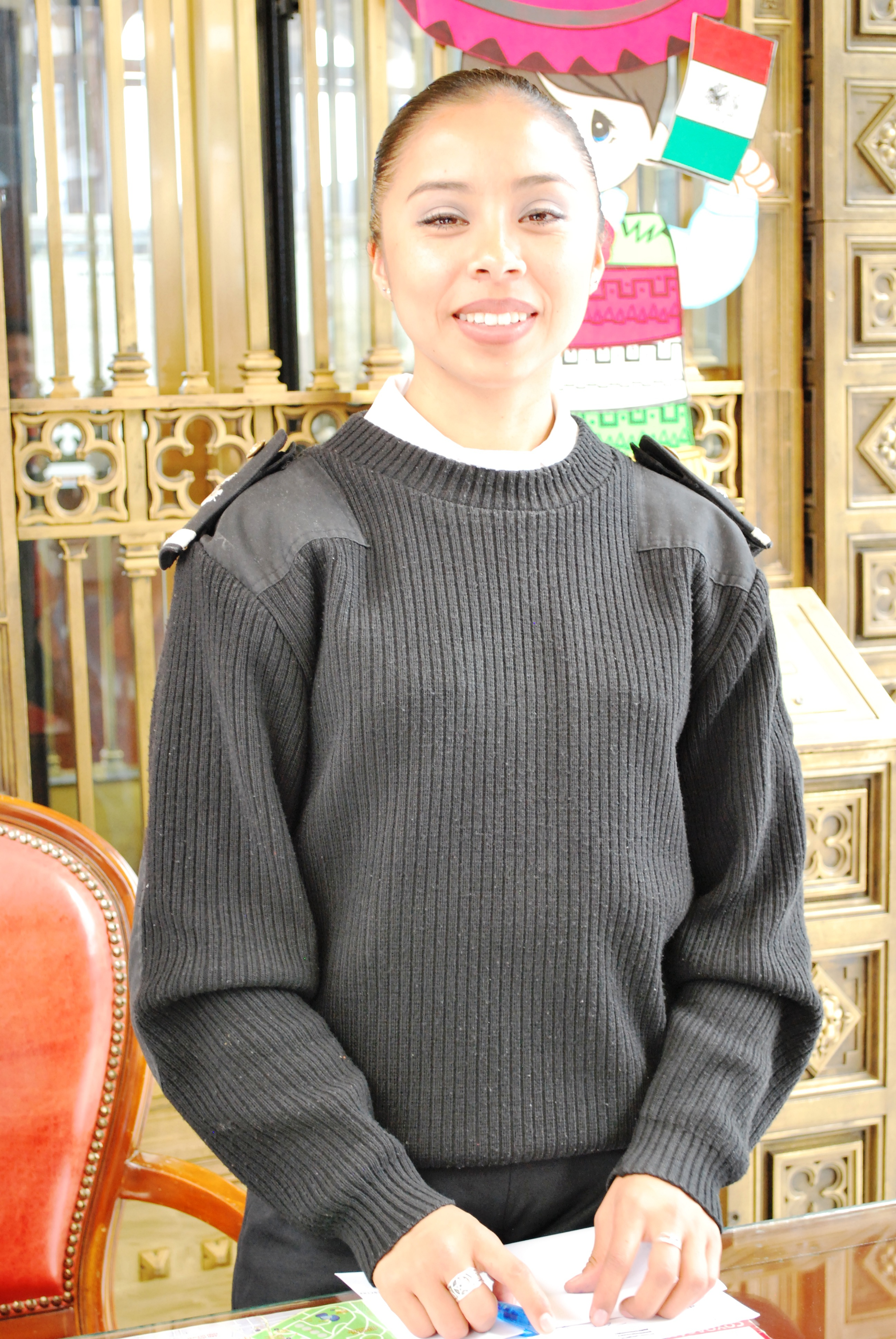
Mexican Navy sailor in 2009

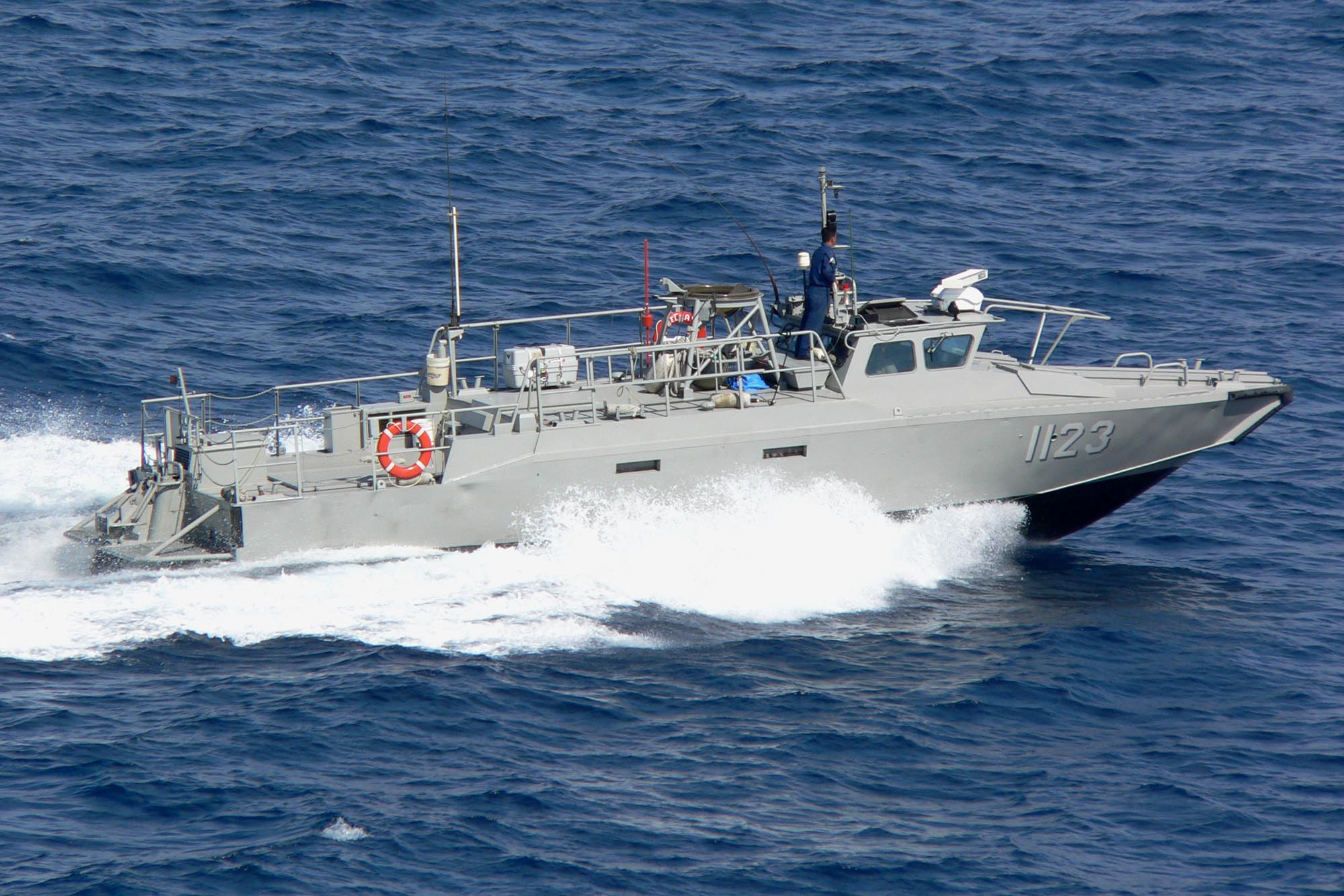
CB 90 HMN – Polaris-class patrol interceptor

== Present fleet ==
Class	Image	Type	Ships	Origin
Frigates (1)
Reformador class		Multipurpose Frigate	F101 Benito Juárez	Netherlands/Mexico – Ships being built in The Netherlands and Mexico. At least 8 ships planned for fleet modernisation plan.
Missile boats (2)
Huracán class		Missile boat	A301 Huracán; A302 Tormenta	Israel – ex-Israeli Navy Sa'ar 4.5-class missile boat
Patrol vessel and other Warships (24)
Oaxaca class		Offshore patrol vessels	P161 Oaxaca; P162 Baja California; P163 Independencia; P164 Revolución; P165 Chiapas; P166 Hidalgo; P167 Jalisco; P168 Tabasco	Mexico
Durango class		Offshore Patrol Vessel	P151 Durango; P152 Sonora; P153 Guanajuato; P154 Veracruz	Mexico
Sierra class		Corvette	P141 Sierra; P143 Prieto; P144 Romero	Mexico
Holzinger class		Offshore patrol vessels	P131 Holzinger; P132 Godínez; P133 De la Vega; P134 Berriozabal	Mexico
Uribe class		Offshore patrol vessels	P122 Azueta; P123 Baranda; P124 Bretón; P125 Blanco; P126 Monasterio	Spain
Tenochtitlan class		Coastal patrol	PC331 Tenochtitlan; PC332 Teotihuacan; PC333 ARM Palenque; PC334 ARM Mitla; PC335 ARM Uxmal; PC336 ARM Tajin; PC337 ARM Tulum; PC338 ARM Monte Albán; PC339 ARM Bonampak; PC340 Chichen Iztzá	Netherlands/Mexico Based on Damen Stan Patrol 4207
Azteca class		Coastal patrol	PC202 Cordova; PC206 Rayón; PC207 Rejón; PC208 De la Fuente; PC209 Guzmán; PC210 Ramírez; PC211 Mariscal; PC212 Jara; PC214 Colima; PC215 Lizardi; PC216 Mugica; PC218 Velazco; PC220 Macías; PC223 Tamaulipas; PC224 Yucatán; PC225 Tabasco; PC226 Cochimie; PC228 Puebla; PC230 Vicario; PC231 Ortíz	United Kingdom; Mexico
Demócrata class		Coastal patrol	PC241 Demócrata; PC242 Francisco I. Madero	Mexico
Cabo class		Coastal patrol	PC271 Corriente; PC272 Corso; PC273 Catoche	Mexico
Punta class		Coastal patrol	PC-281 Morro; PC-282 Mastún	Mexico
Interceptors
Polaris class		Small Patrol vessel	44 In service	Sweden
Polaris II class		Small Patrol vessel	6 In service + 17 under construction	Mexico
Acuario A/B class		Patrol vessel	In service	Mexico
Isla class		Patrol boat	In service	Mexico
Amphibious ships (2)
Papaloapan class		Tank landing ship	A411 Papaloapan; A412 Usumacinta	United States – ex-USN Newport-class tank landing ship
Logistic support vessel (2)
Montes Azules class		Landing ship	BAL01 Montes Azules; BAL02 Libertador (construction completed, inaugurated on September 10, 2012)	Mexico
TBD class		Supply ship	BAL11 Isla Madre Launched July 11, 2016.	Netherlands/Mexico Based on Damen Stan 5009 Fast Crew Supplier
Aguascalientes class		Supply ship	ATQ-01 Arm Aguascalientes	United States
Mine counter-measure (6)
Banderas class		Minesweeper	Banderas; Magdalena; Kino; Yavaros; Chamela; Tepoca	United States
Auxiliary vessels
Huasteco class		Multipurpose logistics vessel	AMP01 Huasteco; AMP02 Zapoteco	Mexico
Maya class		Multipurpose	ATR01 Maya; ATR02 Tarasco	Mexico
B.E.Cuauhtémoc class		Three-masted barque sail training ship	BE01 Cuauhtémoc	Spain

The Mexican Navy includes 60 smaller patrol boats and 32 auxiliary ships. It acquired 40 fast military assault crafts, designated CB 90 HMN, between 1999 and 2001 and obtained a production license in 2002, enabling further units to be manufactured in Mexico.

== Aircraft ==
Aircraft inventory
Aircraft	Type	Origin	Quantity
King Air	surveillance	United States	5
CASA C-212	maritime patrol	Spain	7
CASA/IPTN CN-235	maritime patrol / SAR	Spain / Indonesia	6
Cessna 208	utility / transport	United States	2
Super King Air	utility / transport	United States	4
CASA CN-235	maritime patrol / SAR	Spain / Indonesia	6
Bombardier Dash 8	maritime patrol / SAR	Canada	2
Turbo Commander	transport	United States	4
Learjet 45	utility / transport	United States	2
Mil Mi-17	utility	Russia	22
MD Explorer	utility	United States	6
Sikorsky UH-60	utility	United States	9
Eurocopter EC725	SAR / transport	France	3
Eurocopter AS565	SAR / utility	France	14
Eurocopter AS555	utility	France	1
Zlín Z 42	trainer	Czech Republic	26
Zlín Z 43	trainer	Czech Republic	2
T-6 Texan II	trainer	United States	13
Schweizer S333	rotorcraft trainer	United States	10
SPARTAAM	surveillance	Mexico	3
SPARTAAM SANT-DAV	surveillance / reconnaissance	Mexico	Unkown quantity but ready for production.
SPARTAAM Quetzal	surveillance / reconnaissance	Mexico	Unkown quantity but in preparation for production.

== Radar systems ==
Radar	Origin	Type	Notes
RINUS	Mexico	2D surface-survelliance radar	There are currently 3 in active service
Tzinacán / Tzinacán-200+	Mexico	3D/2D air-surveillance radar	Unkown quantity

== Modern equipment ==
Mexican Naval Infantry Inventory
Vehicle/System	Type	Versions
Armoured Vehicles
BTR-60/BTR-70	Amphibious Armored Personnel Carrier	APC-70
Carat Security Group	Armoured car	Wolverine (Escorpion)
Renault Sherpa Light	Light Armored Vehicle	MACK Sherpa Scout
VBTE Escualo	Light Armored Vehicle	VBTE-1, VBTE-2, VBTE-3
Vehículo Táctico Ligero	Light Armored Vehicle	4x4 light armored vehicle
Land Rover	Military light utility vehicle	Defender 4x4
Infantry Transport Vehicles
AM General HMMWV	Military light utility vehicle	M1026, M1038, M1151
Ford-150	Pickup truck	4x4 F-150 series pick up
Ford-250	Pickup truck	4x4 F-250 series pick up
Dodge Ram	Pickup truck	4x4 Pick up
Mercedes-Benz G-Wagen	Military light utility vehicle	4x4 G-class
Trucks
Mercedes-Benz Zetros	Military truck	6x6 truck
Ural-4320	Military truck	Off-road 6x6 truck
Unimog U-4000	Military truck	4x4 truck
Gama Goat	Amphibious 6-wheeled vehicle	6x6 truck
Freightliner M2	Truck	4x2 truck

== Individual weapons and equipment ==
Mexican Naval Inventory
Name	Versions	Type
M16A2 rifle	5.56×45mm NATO	Assault rifle
M4 Carbine	5.56×45mm NATO	Carbine
IMI Galil	5.56×45mm NATO	Assault rifle
Heckler & Koch MP5	9×19mm	Submachine gun
Heckler & Koch UMP	.45 ACP	Submachine gun
FN P90	5.7×28mm	Submachine gun
Colt M1911	.45 ACP	Semi-automatic pistol
Beretta	9×19mm Parabellum	Pistol
Glock 17	9×19mm Parabellum	Semi-automatic pistol
Five-seveN	5.7×28mm	Semi-automatic pistol
Heckler & Koch MSG90	7.62×51mm NATO	Sniper rifle
Barrett M82	.50 BMG	Anti-material rifle
Remington 700	7.62×51mm NATO	Sniper rifle
FN Minimi	5.56×45mm NATO	Light machine gun
CETME Ameli	5.56×45mm NATO	Light machine gun
GAU-19	12.7×99mm NATO	Rotary machinegun
M2 Browning machine gun	12.7×99mm NATO	Heavy machine gun
M134	7.62×51mm NATO	Rotary machinegun
STK 40 AGL	40mm	Automatic grenade launcher
Milkor MGL	40mm	Grenade launcher
M203 grenade launcher	40mm	Grenade launcher
Remington 1100	12	Semi-automatic shotgun

== Artillery ==
Mexican Naval Inventory
Name	Versions	Type
Self-propelled artillery
Bofors 40 mm Automatic Gun L/70	40mm	Anti-aircraft autocannon
Oerlikon	20mm	Anti-aircraft autocannon
Shipboard anti-aircraft artillery
Phalanx CIWS	20mm	Close in Weapon System
Multiple rocket launchers
FIROS	122mm	multiple rocket launcher
Towed artillery
OTO Melara Mod 56	105mm	Towed howitzer
K6	120mm	Heavy mortar
M29	81mm	Medium mortar
Brandt LR	60mm	Light mortar
Bofors 40 mm Automatic Gun L/60	40mm	Towed anti-aircraft autocannon
Bofors 40 mm Automatic Gun L/70	40mm	Towed anti-aircraft autocannon
Oerlikon	20mm	Towed anti-aircraft autocannon
Anti-shipping missiles
Gabriel	Mk. II	Anti-ship missile
RGM-84L Harpoon	Block II	Anti-ship missile
Anti-aircraft missiles
SA-18	72.2mm	Surface-to-air missile
RIM-116	RIM-116 Rolling Airframe Missile (RAM)	Surface-to-air missile
RIM-162	RIM-162 Evolved SeaSparrow Missile (ESSM)	Surface-to-air missile
Light anti-tank weapons
RPG-75	Anti-tank weapon	68mm
B300	Rocket-propelled grenade	82mm

== Future ==
For the year 2008 budget, the Mexican Congress approved a US$15 million fund to build only 17 out of the 60 combat boats requested. These ships, designated CB 90 HMN, are to increase the Mexican Navy's fast boat fleet. Additional budgets will be awarded each passing year. In total, the Mexican Navy has over 189 operational ships.

In January 2013, the 112th Session of US Congress authorized the transfer of the Oliver Hazard Perry-class frigates USS Curts and USS McClusky to the Mexican Navy, but due to the cost of overhauling the vessels and the removal of all the weapons systems and most of the electronics and radar gear by the USN prior to transfer, this is still undecided by Mexico. The offer expired on January 1, 2016.

=== 2014 ===
On March 25, 2014 Beechcraft Corporation received an order of 2 T-6C+ military trainers from the Mexican Navy.

On June 24, 2014, the Mexican Government requested the purchase of 5 UH-60Ms in USG configuration from the U.S.; its estimated cost is $225 million. Also on June 24, BAE Systems announced it was awarded a contract by the Mexican Government to supply the navy with 4 Mk 3 57mm naval guns, for the ships of the Reformador class.

=== 2025 ===
On September 9, 2025 The Mexican Navy (more specifically its Mexican Naval Infantry Corps) has announced an effort to acquire 728 bomber drones and 381 drones similar to kamikaze drones as an attempt to modernize itself.

Planned Fleets
Class	Type	Ship	Origin
OPV-2025 (Yucatán class)	Offshore patrol vessels	Unkown, with 7 planned	Mexico
Multipurpose vessel (MPV-100)	Multi-purpose vessel	Unkown, with 1 planned	Mexico

== See also ==
- Military of Mexico
- Mexican Naval Aviation
- Symphonic Orchestra and Chorus of the Secretariat of the Navy of Mexico
