= List of ships of the Mexican Navy =

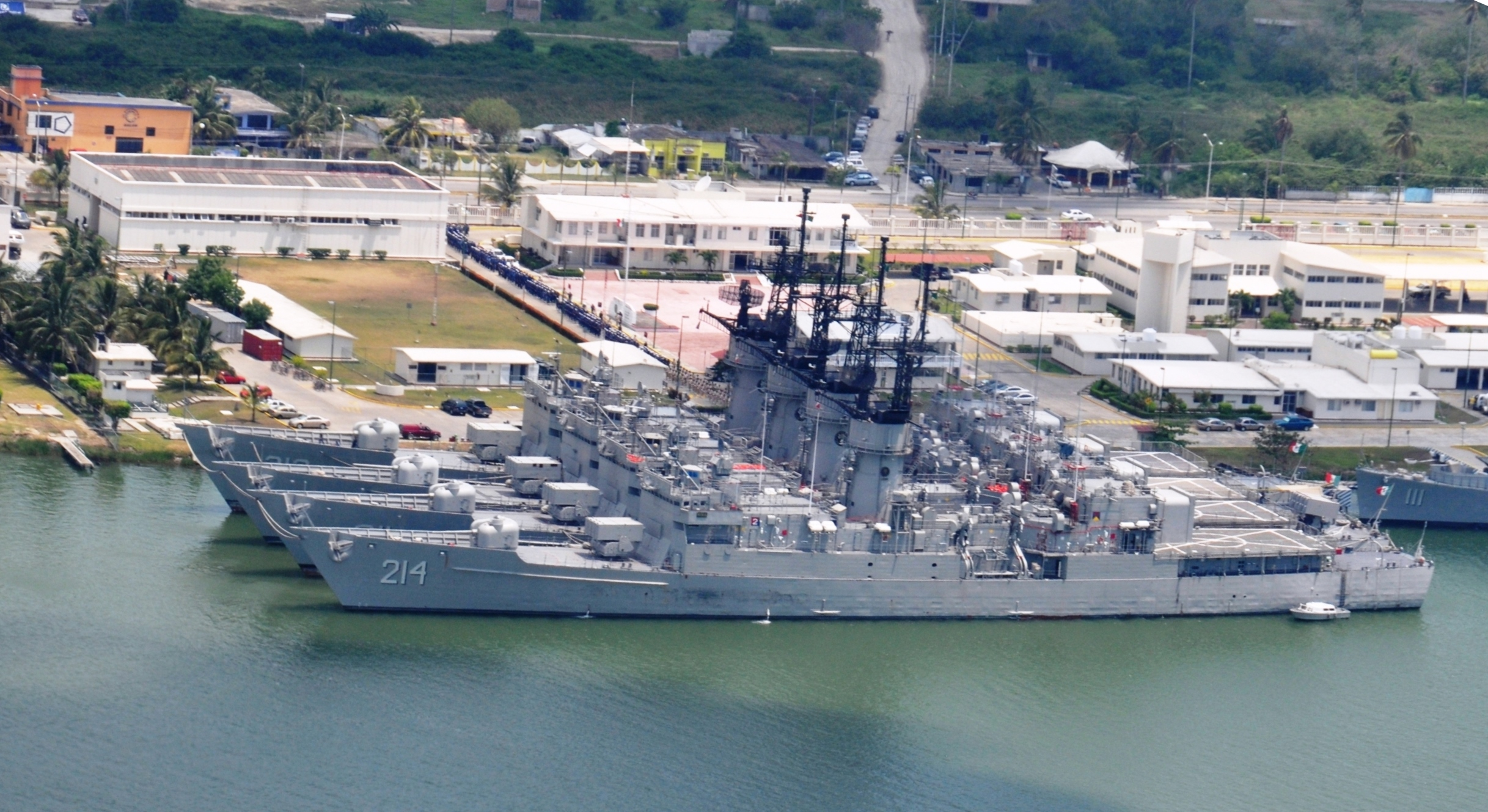
Allende-class frigates

The list of Mexican Navy ships comprises all of the vessels that make up the Mexican Navy. The Mexican Navy operates one frigate, two missile boats, and a number of patrol ships for both offshore and inshore patrol. The Mexican Navy also has two tank landing ships at its disposal.

== Ships by number ==
=== Destroyers ===
- Manuel Azueta class - 0 (1, scuttled on 6 November 2017 in the Rizo reef zone off Antón Lizardo, Veracruz)
- Cuauhtémoc class - 0 (2 dismantled)
- Quetzalcóatl class - 0 (2, One ship scuttled on 24 November 2006 to form an artificial reef (her main tripod mast is on display at Mexican Pacific Fleet headquarters) & other ship was slated to also be sunk as an artificial reef)

Total: 0

=== Frigates ===
- California class - 0 -(4, all ships scrapped in 1964-65)
- Brown class - 0 - (2, both decommissioned)
- Allende class - 0 (4, one ship scuttled on 27 April 2022 East of Tuxpan, Veracruz, Mexico, and the other 1-3 were awaiting disposal at Tuxpan)
- Reformador class - 1

Total: 1

=== Corvettes ===
- Sierra class - 3 (4, one ship taken out of service, after a fire incident in 2003, & sunk as a target ship in 2007)

=== Missile boats ===
- Huracan class - 2

=== Offshore patrol vessels ===
- Valle class - 10 (11, 10 ships still active, 1 still at least afloat in Guaymas in January 2009; 1 other ship's fate unknown, 5 ships previously-retired in 1988 or 2004, 1 previously-scuttled as a dive wreck & artificial reef on 3/3/2022 near San Carlos, Sonora, Mexico, and 1 more sunk in 2006 by the Mexican Navy)
- California class - 0 (5, 3 ships scrapped, 1 wrecked on the Bahia Peninsula on 16 January 1972 & 1 stricken from the Mexican Navy on 16 July 2001)
- Coahuila class - 0 (1, stricken from the rolls of the Mexican Navy in July 2001)
- Uribe class - 5
- Holzinger class - 4
- Durango-class patrol vessel - 4
- Oaxaca-class patrol vessel - 8

TOTAL:31

=== Coastal patrol boats ===
- Demócrata class - 2
- Azteca class - 20
- Punto class - 3
- Tenochtitlan class - 10
- Cabo class - 3

=== Interceptor patrol boats ===
- Polaris class - 48
- Isla class - 4
- Acuario class - 6
- Acuario B class - 4
- Polaris II class - 9

=== Tank landing ships ===
- Panuco class - 1 - used as a target ship & sunk in 2010, becoming an artificial reef
- Papaloapan class - 2

=== Logistics ships ===
- Isla Tiburón class - 2
- Isla Madre class - 1

=== Training ships ===
- Cuauhtémoc class - 1

=== Transport ships ===
- Maya class - 2

=== Tankers ===
- Aguascalientes class - 2

=== Tugboats ===
- Otomí class - 4
- Sotoyomo class - 1
- Iztaccihuatl class - 6

== List of ships ==
Hull no.	Ship name	Class	Type	Homeport	Comment	
F-101 / POLA-101	Benito Juárez	Reformador (Sigma 10514 LROPV)	Frigate / Oceanic Patrol Vessel		Mexican built Dutch design	
A-301	Huracán	Huracán	Missile boat		Purchased from Israel	
A-302	Tormenta	Huracán	Missile boat		Purchased from Israel	
PO-102	Juan de la Barrera	Valle	Offshore patrol vessel		Purchased from the United States	
PO-103	Mariano Escobedo	Valle	Offshore patrol vessel		Purchased from the United States	
PO-104	Manuel Doblado	Valle	Offshore patrol vessel		Purchased from the United States	
PO-108	Juan N. Álvarez	Valle	Offshore patrol vessel		Purchased from the United States	
PO-109	Manuel Gutiérrez Zamora	Valle	Offshore patrol vessel		Purchased from the United States	
PO-110	Valentín Gómez Farías	Valle	Offshore patrol vessel		Purchased from the United States	
PO-112	Francisco Zarco	Valle	Offshore patrol vessel		Purchased from the United States	
PO-113	Ignacio L. Vallarta	Valle	Offshore patrol vessel		Purchased from the United States	
PO-114	Jesús González Ortega	Valle	Offshore patrol vessel		Purchased from the United States	
PO-117	Mariano Matamoros	Valle	Offshore patrol vessel		Purchased from the United States	
PO-121	Uribe	Valle	Offshore patrol vessel	Uribe	Offshore patrol vessel	Purchased from Spain
PO-122	Azueta		Purchased from Spain	Uribe	Offshore patrol vessel	
PO-123	Baranda		Purchased from Spain	Uribe	Offshore patrol vessel	
PO-124	Bretón		Purchased from Spain	Uribe	Offshore patrol vessel	
PO-125	Blanco		Purchased from Spain	Uribe	Offshore patrol vessel	
PO-126	Monasterio		Purchased from Spain	Uribe	Offshore patrol vessel	
PO-131	Holzinger	Holzinger	Offshore patrol vessel		Built in Mexico	
PO-132	Godínez	Holzinger	Offshore patrol vessel		Built in Mexico	
PO-133	De la Vega	Holzinger	Offshore patrol vessel		Built in Mexico	
PO-134	Berriozabal	Holzinger	Offshore patrol vessel		Built in Mexico	
PO-141	Sierra	Sierra	Offshore patrol vessel / Corvette		Designed and built in Mexico	
PO-143	Prierto	Sierra	Offshore patrol vessel / Corvette		Designed and built in Mexico	
PO-144	Romero	Sierra	Offshore patrol vessel / Corvette		Designed and built in Mexico	
PO-151	Durango	Durango	Offshore patrol vessel		Designed and built in Mexico	
PO-152	Sonora	Durango	Offshore patrol vessel		Designed and built in Mexico	
PO-153	Guanajuato	Durango	Offshore patrol vessel		Designed and built in Mexico	
PO-154	Veracruz	Durango	Offshore patrol vessel		Designed and built in Mexico	
PO-161	Oaxaca	Oaxaca	Offshore patrol vessel		Designed and built in Mexico	
PO-162	Baja California	Oaxaca	Offshore patrol vessel		Designed and built in Mexico	
PO-163	Independencia	Oaxaca	Offshore patrol vessel		Designed and built in Mexico	
PO-164	Revolución	Oaxaca	Offshore patrol vessel		Designed and built in Mexico	
PO-165	Chiapas	Oaxaca	Offshore patrol vessel		Designed and built in Mexico	
PO-166	Hidalgo	Oaxaca	Offshore patrol vessel		Designed and built in Mexico	
PO-167	Jalisco	Oaxaca	Offshore patrol vessel		Designed and built in Mexico	
PO-168	Tabasco	Oaxaca	Offshore patrol vessel		Designed and built in Mexico	
PC-202	Cordova	Azteca	Coastal patrol boat		Built in Mexico	
PC-206	Rayón	Azteca	Coastal patrol boat		Built in Mexico	
PC-207	Rejón	Azteca	Coastal patrol boat			
PC-208	De la Fuente	Azteca	Coastal patrol boat		Built in Mexico	
PC-209	Guzmán	Azteca	Coastal patrol boat		Built in Mexico	
PC-210	Ramírez	Azteca	Coastal patrol boat		Built in Mexico	
PC-211	Mariscal	Azteca	Coastal patrol boat		Built in Mexico	
PC-212	Jara	Azteca	Coastal patrol boat		Built in Mexico	
PC-214	Colima	Azteca	Coastal patrol boat		Built in Mexico	
PC-215	Lizardi	Azteca	Coastal patrol boat		Built in Mexico	
PC-216	Mugica	Azteca	Coastal patrol boat		Built in Mexico	
PC-218	Velazco	Azteca	Coastal patrol boat		Built in Mexico	
PC-220	Macías	Azteca	Coastal patrol boat		Built in Mexico	
PC-223	Tamaulipas	Azteca	Coastal patrol boat		Built in Mexico	
PC-224	Yucatán	Azteca	Coastal patrol boat		Built in Mexico	
PC-225	Tabasco	Azteca	Coastal patrol boat		Built in Mexico	
PC-226	Cochimie	Azteca	Coastal patrol boat		Built in Mexico	
PC-228	Puebla	Azteca	Coastal patrol boat		Built in Mexico	
PC-230	Vicario	Azteca	Coastal patrol boat		Built in Mexico	
PC-231	Ortíz	Azteca	Coastal patrol boat		Built in Mexico	
PC-241	Demócrata	Demócrata	Coastal patrol boat		Built in Mexico	
PC-242	Francisco I. Madero	Demócrata	Coastal patrol boat		Built in Mexico	
PC-331	Tenochtitlan	Tenochtitlan	Coastal patrol boat		Built in Mexico	
PC-332	Teotihuacan	Tenochtitlan	Coastal patrol boat		Built in Mexico	
PC-333	Palenque	Tenochtitlan	Coastal patrol boat		Built in Mexico	
PC-334	Mitla	Tenochtitlan	Coastal patrol boat		Built in Mexico	
PC-335	Uxmal	Tenochtitlan	Coastal patrol boat		Built in Mexico	
PC-336	Tajín	Tenochtitlan	Coastal patrol boat		Built in Mexico	
PC-337	Tulum	Tenochtitlan	Coastal patrol boat		Built in Mexico	
PC-338	Monte Albán	Tenochtitlan	Coastal patrol boat		Built in Mexico	
PC-339	Bonampak	Tenochtitlan	Coastal patrol boat		Built in Mexico	
PC-340	Chichen Itzá	Tenochtitlan	Coastal patrol boat		Built in Mexico	
PC-271	Cabo Corrientes	Cabo	Coastal patrol boat		Purchased from the United States	
PC-272	Cabo Corzo	Cabo	Coastal patrol boat		Purchased from the United States	
PC-273	Cabo Catoche	Cabo	Coastal patrol boat		Purchased from the United States	
PI-1101	Polaris	Polaris	Interceptor patrol boat			
PI-1102	Sirius	Polaris	Interceptor patrol boat			
PI-1103	Capella	Polaris	Interceptor patrol boat			
PI-1104	Canopus	Polaris	Interceptor patrol boat			
PI-1105	Vega	Polaris	Interceptor patrol boat			
PI-1106	Achernar	Polaris	Interceptor patrol boat			
PI-1107	Rigel	Polaris	Interceptor patrol boat			
PI-1108	Arturus	Polaris	Interceptor patrol boat			
PI-1109	Alpheratz	Polaris	Interceptor patrol boat			
PI-1110	Procyon	Polaris	Interceptor patrol boat			
PI-1111	Avyor	Polaris	Interceptor patrol boat			
PI-1112	Deben	Polaris	Interceptor patrol boat			
PI-1113	Fomalhuat	Polaris	Interceptor patrol boat			
PI-1114	Pollux	Polaris	Interceptor patrol boat			
PI-1115	Regulus	Polaris	Interceptor patrol boat			
PI-1116	Acrux	Polaris	Interceptor patrol boat			
PI-1117	Spica	Polaris	Interceptor patrol boat			
PI-1118	Hadar	Polaris	Interceptor patrol boat			
PI-1119	Shaula	Polaris	Interceptor patrol boat			
PI-1120	Mirfak	Polaris	Interceptor patrol boat			
PI-1121	Ankaa	Polaris	Interceptor patrol boat			
PI-1122	Bellatrix	Polaris	Interceptor patrol boat			
PI-1123	Elnath	Polaris	Interceptor patrol boat			
PI-1124	Arnilan	Polaris	Interceptor patrol boat			
PI-1125	Peacock	Polaris	Interceptor patrol boat			
PI-1126	Betelgeuse	Polaris	Interceptor patrol boat			
PI-1127	Adhara	Polaris	Interceptor patrol boat			
PI-1128	Alioth	Polaris	Interceptor patrol boat			
PI-1129	Rosalhague	Polaris	Interceptor patrol boat			
PI-1130	Nunki	Polaris	Interceptor patrol boat			
PI-1131	Hamal	Polaris	Interceptor patrol boat			
PI-1132	Suhail	Polaris	Interceptor patrol boat			
PI-1133	Dubhe	Polaris	Interceptor patrol boat			
PI-1134	Denebola	Polaris	Interceptor patrol boat			
PI-1135	Alkaid	Polaris	Interceptor patrol boat			
PI-1136	Alphecca	Polaris	Interceptor patrol boat			
PI-1137	Eltanin	Polaris	Interceptor patrol boat			
PI-1138	Cochab	Polaris	Interceptor patrol boat			
PI-1139	Enif	Polaris	Interceptor patrol boat			
PI-1140	Shedaf	Polaris	Interceptor patrol boat			
PI-1141	Markab	Polaris	Interceptor patrol boat			
PI-1142	Megrez	Polaris	Interceptor patrol boat			
PI-1143	Mizar	Polaris	Interceptor patrol boat			
PI-1144	Phekda	Polaris	Interceptor patrol boat			
PI-1145	Acamar	Polaris	Interceptor patrol boat			
PI-1146	Diphda	Polaris	Interceptor patrol boat			
PI-1147	Menkar	Polaris	Interceptor patrol boat			
PI-1148	Sabik	Polaris	Interceptor patrol boat			
PI-1201	Coronado	Isla	Interceptor patrol boat		Built in Mexico	
PI-1202	Lobos	Isla	Interceptor patrol boat		Built in Mexico	
PI-1203	Guadalupe	Isla	Interceptor patrol boat		Built in Mexico	
PI-1204	Cozumel	Isla	Interceptor patrol boat		Built in Mexico	
PI-1301	Acuario	Acuario	Interceptor patrol boat		Built in Mexico	
PI-1302	Aguila	Acuario	Interceptor patrol boat		Built in Mexico	
PI-1303	Aries	Acuario	Interceptor patrol boat		Built in Mexico	
PI-1304	Auriga	Acuario	Interceptor patrol boat		Built in Mexico	
PI-1305	Cáncer	Acuario	Interceptor patrol boat		Built in Mexico	
PI-1306	Capricornio	Acuario	Interceptor patrol boat		Built in Mexico	
PI-1307	Centauro	Acuario B	Interceptor patrol boat		Built in Mexico	
PI-1308	Géminis	Acuario B	Interceptor patrol boat		Built in Mexico	
PI-1401	Miaplacidus	Polaris II	Interceptor patrol boat			
PI-1402	Algol	Polaris II	Interceptor patrol boat			
PI-1403	Castor	Polaris II	Interceptor patrol boat			
PI-1404	Merak	Polaris II	Interceptor patrol boat			
PI-1405	Caph	Polaris II	Interceptor patrol boat			
PI-1406	Mirach	Polaris II	Interceptor patrol boat			
PI-1407	Alhena	Polaris II	Interceptor patrol boat			
PI-1408	Saiph	Polaris II	Interceptor patrol boat			
PI-1409	Algorab	Polaris II	Interceptor patrol boat			
A-411	Papaloapan	Papaloapan	Tank landing ship		Purchased from the United States	
A-412	Usumacinta	Papaloapan	Tank landing ship		Purchased from the United States	
BAL-01	Isla Tubarón	Isla Tubarón	Logistics ship		Built in Mexico	
BAL-02	Isla Holbox	Isla Tubarón	Logistics ship		Built in Mexico	
BAL-11	Isla Madre	Isla Madre (Damen Stan 5009 Fast Crew Supplier)	Logistics ship		Built in Netherlands	
BE-01	Cuauhtémoc	-	Sail training ship		Built in Spain	
BI-01	Comala	Altair	Research ship		Purchased from the United States	
BI-02	Onjuku		Research ship		Confiscated from Japan	
BI-03	Sayulita	Altair	Research ship	Manzanillo	Purchased from the United States	
BI-04	Pátzcuaro	Altair	Research ship	Veracruz	Purchased from the United States	
BI-05	Rio Suchiate		Research ship		Purchased from the United States	
BI-06	Zimapán	Altair	Research ship		Purchased from the United States	
BI-07	Amealco	Altair	Research ship		Purchased from the United States	
BI-08	Mazunte	Altair	Research ship		?	
BI-09	Rizo	-	Research ship	?		
BI-10	Cabezo	-	Research ship		?	
BI-11	De Adentro	-	Research ship		?	
ATR-01	Maya	Maya	Transport ship		?	
ATR-03	Tarasco	Maya	Transport ship		?	
ARE-01	Otomí	Otomí	Tugboat		Purchased from the United States	
ARE-02	Yaqui	Otomí	Tugboat		Purchased from the United States	
ARE-03	Seri	Otomí	Tugboat		Purchased from the United States	
ARE-04	Cora	Otomí	Tugboat		Purchased from the United States	
ARE-05	Iztaccihuatl	Iztaccihuatl	Tugboat		Purchased from the United States	
ARE-06	Popocatépetl	Iztaccihuatl	Tugboat		Purchased from the United States	
ARE-07	Citlaltépetl	Iztaccihuatl	Tugboat		Purchased from the United States	
ARE-08	Xinantécatl	Iztaccihuatl	Tugboat		Purchased from the United States	
ARE-09	Matlalcueye	Iztaccihuatl	Tugboat		Purchased from the United States	
ARE-10	Tláloc	Iztaccihuatl	Tugboat		Purchased from the United States	
ARE-11	Tepehua	Kukulkán	Tugboat			
ARE-12	Huave	Kukulkán	Tugboat			
ATQ-01	Aguascalientes	Aguascalientes	Tanker		Purchased from the United States	
ATQ-02	Tlaxcala	Aguascalientes	Tanker		Purchased from the United States	
AMP-01	Huasteco	-	Multipurpose		Built in Mexico	
AMP-02	Zapoteco	-	Multipurpose		Built in Mexico	
ADR-01	Banderas	-	Dredger		?	
ADR-02	Magdalena	-	Dredger		?	
ADR-03	Kino	-	Dredger		?	
ADR-04	Yavaros	-	Dredger		?	
ADR-05	Chamela	-	Dredger		?	
ADR-06	Tepoca	-	Dredger		?	
ADR-07	Todo Santos	-	Dredger		?	
ADR-08	Asunción	-	Dredger		?	
ADR-09	Almejas	-	Dredger		?	
ADR-10	Chacagua	-	Dredger		?	
ADR-11	Coyuca	-	Dredger		?	
ADR-12	Farallón	-	Dredger		?	
ADR-13	Chairel	-	Dredger		?	
ADR-14	San Adrés	-	Dredger		?	
ADR-15	San Ignacio	-	Dredger		?	
ADR-16	Términos	-	Dredger		?	
ADR-17	Teculapa	-	Dredger		?	
ADR-31	Contralmirante Luis Schaufelberger Alatorre	José Villalpando Rascón	Dredger		?	
ADR-32	Comodoro David Coello Ochoa	José Villalpando Rascón	Dredger		?	
AM-60801	Alvarado	-	Support ship		?	
AM-41801	Blanquilla	-	Support ship		?	
AM-22601	Catemaco	-	Support ship		?	
AM-51701	Chapala	-	Support ship		?	
AM-21202	De en Medio	-	Support ship		?	
AM-22602	Galleguilla	-	Support ship		?	
AM-51902	Lagartos	-	Support ship		?	
AM-60802	Pájaros	-	Support ship		?	
AM-21201	Palancar	-	Support ship		?	
AM-51901	Progreso	-	Support ship		?	
AM-32315	Sisal	-	Support ship		?	
AM-32316	Tanhuijo	-	Support ship		?	

== Decommissioned ships ==
Hull no.	Ship name	Class		Date retired	Comment
PC-281	Punto Morro	Punto	Coastal patrol boat	Unknown	
PC-282	Punto Mastun	Punto	Coastal patrol boat	Unknown	
G-04	Ponciano Arriaga	Valle	Offshore patrol vessel	1988	
G-17	Mariano Matamoros	Valle	Offshore patrol vessel	Unknown, Before 1993	
PO-101	Leandro Valle	Valle	Offshore patrol vessel	2004	Sunk in 2006 by Mexican Navy
PO-105	Sebastián Lerdo de Tejada	Valle	Offshore patrol vessel	2004	
PO-106	Santos Degollado	Valle	Offshore patrol vessel	n/a	Sunk as dive wreck 3 March 2022
PO-107	Ignacio de la Llave	Valle	Offshore patrol vessel	2004	
PO-111	Ignacio Altamirano	Valle	Offshore patrol vessel	2004	Supposedly seen abandoned, afloat near Guaymas, Mexico.
PO-115	Felipe Xicoténcatl	Valle	Offshore patrol vessel	2004	
PO-116	Juan Aldama	2004			
B-03	California	California	Offshore patrol vessel	1972	Wrecked at Baja California, 16 January 1972
B-04	Papaloapan	California	Offshore patrol vessel	1976	Scrapped after running aground, 1976
B-05	Tehuantepec	California	Offshore patrol vessel	1989	Scrapped, 1989
B-06	Usumacinta	California	Offshore patrol vessel	16 July 2001	Scrapped, 2002
B-07	Coahuila	Coahuila	Offshore patrol vessel	July 2001	Renamed ARM Vincente Guerrero, 1994. Later renamed again to ARM Coahuila (E-21).
B-08	Chihuahua	California	Offshore patrol vessel	16 July 2001	
E-01	Cuauhtémoc	Cuauhtémoc	Destroyer	1982	
E-02	Cuitláhuac	Cuauhtémoc	Destroyer	2001	Plans of converting the ship to a museum ship fell through and later scrapped.
E-03	Quetzalcoatl	Quetzalcóatl	Destroyer	2002	Renamed ARM Ilhuicamina (E-10), late 1982.
E-04	Netzahualcóyotl	Quetzalcóatl	Destroyer	2014	
PO-142	Juarez	Sierra	Offshore patrol vessel / Corvette	2003	Sunk as target, 2007
-	California (1947)	California	Frigate	Unknown	Scrapped, 1964
-	General José María Morelos	California	Frigate	Unknown	Scrapped, 1964
-	General Vicente Guerrero	California	Frigate	Unknown	Scrapped, 1964
-	Papaloapan	California	Frigate	Unknown	Scrapped, 1965
F-201	Nicolas Bravo	Bravo	Frigate	2017	
F-202	Hermenegildo Galeana	Bravo	Frigate	2017	
F-211	Allende	Allende	Frigate	2016	
F-212	Abasolo	Allende	Frigate	2022	Scuttled 35nm E of Tuxpan, Veracruz, Mexico, 27 April 2022.
F-213	Victoria	Allende	Frigate	2016	Awaiting disposal at Tuxpan
F-214	Mina	Allende	Frigate	2016	Awaiting disposal
A-01	Rio Panuco	Panuco	Tank landing ship	Unknown	Sunk as artificial reef, 2010
A-02	Manzanillo	Panuco	Tank landing ship	16 November 2011	
A-05	General Vincente Guerrero	Panuco	Tank landing ship	Unknown	Renamed ARM Rio Grijalva (A-403), 1993.
A-06	Commodore Manuel Azueta	Manuel Azueta	Training ship / Destroyer	3 July 2015	Renamed ARM Commodore Manuel Azueta Perillos (E-30), 1994. Renamed again to ARM Commodore Manuel Azueta (D-111), 2001.
C-07	Guanajuato	-	Gunboat	2001	Museum ship in Boca del Río, since 2007
-	DM-01	DM-01	Minesweeper	2000	Sunk as artificial reef, August 2001
-	DM-02	DM-01	Minesweeper	1986	Scrapped, 1 August 1988
-	DM-03	DM-01	Minesweeper	16 July 2001	
-	DM-04 (1962)	DM-01	Minesweeper	April 1973	Replaced by another ship from the same class
-	DM-04 (1973)	DM-01	Minesweeper	16 July 2001	
-	DM-05	DM-01	Minesweeper	1999	Sunk as artificial reef, 1999
-	DM-06	DM-01	Minesweeper	1986	
-	DM-07	DM-01	Minesweeper	Unknown	
-	DM-08	DM-01	Minesweeper	Unknown	
-	DM-09	DM-01	Minesweeper	Unknown	
-	DM-10	DM-01	Minesweeper	1986	
-	DM-11	DM-01	Minesweeper	2000	Sunk as artificial reef, 2000
-	DM-12	DM-01	Minesweeper	2000	Sunk as artificial reef, 2000
-	DM-13	DM-01	Minesweeper	2000	Sunk as artificial reef, 2000
-	DM-14	DM-01	Minesweeper	16 July 2001	
-	DM-15	DM-01	Minesweeper	Unknown	
-	DM-16	DM-01	Minesweeper	1986	
-	DM-17	DM-01	Minesweeper	2000	
-	DM-18	DM-01	Minesweeper	16 July 2001	
-	DM-19	DM-01	Minesweeper	16 July 2001	
-	DM-20	DM-01	Minesweeper	After 2007	Sunk as artificial reef, date unknown
H-41	Almirante Câmara	-	Research ship	2004	
-	Sotoyomo	Sotoyomo	Tugboat	Unknown	

== Historical ship ==
Ship name	Type	Service	Photo	Fate
Guadaloupe	Frigate	1842-1847		Sold to the Spanish Navy at Cuba in August 1847
Montezuma	Frigate	1842-1846		Sold to the Spanish Navy at Cuba in August 1846
Meteoro	Brigantine	1848-1850		Sold to Chile, 1850
Libertad	Gunboat	1874-?		
Independencia	Gunboat	1874-?		
Guerra Demócrata	Gunboat	1875-?		
Zaragoza	Corvette	1892-1926		Sunk as target, 1926
Agua Prieta	Gunboat	1920-1935		
Anáhuac	Cruiser	1924-1938		Scrapped, 1938
Orizaba	Yacht	1939-1960		Scrapped, 1960
