= ARM DM-04 =

ARM DM-04 may refer to one of the following Mexican Navy ships:

- ARM DM-04 (1962), the former American Admirable-class minesweeper USS Facility (AM-233); acquired by the Mexican Navy on 2 October 1962 and renamed ARM DM-04; fate unreported, but likely out of service by 1973
- ARM DM-04 (1973), the former American Admirable-class minesweeper USS Specter (AM-306); acquired by the Mexican Navy on 11 April 1973 and renamed ARM DM-04; renamed ARM General Manuel E. Rincón (C52), 1994; She was stricken in July 2001, but her ultimate fate is not reported in secondary resources.
