= ARM Melchor Ocampo =

ARM Melchor Ocampo may refer to one of the following patrol vessels of the Mexican Navy:

- ARM Melchor Ocampo (G10), the former American Auk-class minesweeper USS Roselle (AM-379); acquired by the Mexican Navy on 1 February 1973; renamed Manuel Gutiérrez Zamora (P109), 1993; in active service.
- ARM Melchor Ocampo (G16), the former American Auk-class minesweeper USS Scoter (AM-381); acquired by the Mexican Navy on 19 September 1972 as Gutiérrez Zamora (C84); later reclassified as G16; later renamed Melchor Ocampo; renamed Felipe Xicoténcatl (P115), 1993; retired from service by 2004
