= ARM Gutiérrez Zamora =

ARM Gutiérrez Zamora may refer to one of the following patrol vessels of the Mexican Navy:

- ARM Gutiérrez Zamora (G16), the former American Auk-class minesweeper USS Scoter (AM-381); acquired by the Mexican Navy on 19 September 1972; later reclassified as G16; later renamed Melchor Ocampo; renamed Felipe Xicoténcatl (P115), 1993; retired from service by 2004
- ARM Manuel Gutiérrez Zamora (P109), the former American Auk-class minesweeper USS Roselle (AM-379); acquired by the Mexican Navy on 1 February 1973 as Melchor Ocampo (C78); later reclassified as G10; renamed Manuel Gutiérrez Zamora (P109), 1993; in active service
