= Leon C. Covell =

- Born: December 2, 1877; Middleville, New York, U.S.
- Died: November 20, 1960 (aged 82); San Diego, California, U.S.
- Burial place: Fort Rosecrans National Cemetery
- Military career
- Allegiance: United States
- Branch: United States Coast Guard
- Service years: 1902–1942; 1943–1945
- Rank: Vice Admiral
- Commands: Vice Commandant of the United States Coast Guard; Shoshone; Tahoe; Bear; Gresham; Mackinac; Zara
- Conflicts: World War II; World War I
- Awards: Legion of Merit

Leon Claude Covell (December 2, 1877 – November 20, 1960) was a Rear Admiral in the United States Coast Guard who served as the 2nd Vice Commandant from 1931 to 1941.

Covell was promoted to first lieutenant on January 28, 1909. During World War I, he briefly commanded USS Zara in November 1917 before commanding USS Mackinac from November 25, 1917, to January 7, 1918.

Covell was promoted to lieutenant commander on July 1, 1920, and assigned as the commanding officer of USCGC Gresham on November 24, 1920.

Covell was promoted to commander on April 21, 1924, and assigned as the commanding officer of USCGC Bear on November 1, 1924. He was assigned as the first commanding officer of USCGC Tahoe on November 8, 1928.

Covell was promoted to captain on July 1, 1929, and assigned as the first commanding officer of USCGC Shoshone on December 15, 1930. Having participated in the Bering Sea Patrol since 1925, he was given command of the patrol force during the summer of 1931. Covell was appointed assistant commandant on December 19, 1931, and promoted to rear admiral on May 24, 1939.

Covell retired effective January 1, 1942, after Lloyd T. Chalker was appointed to succeed him on October 9, 1941. He was recalled to active duty in June 1943 to head the Coast Guard Training Station at Manhattan Beach, Brooklyn. Covell was later awarded the Legion of Merit for his World War II service.

Covell retired as a rear admiral but was advanced to vice admiral on the retired list several years later.

== Personal ==
His younger brother William E. R. Covell attended the U.S. Military Academy, graduating first out of 164 cadets in the class the stars fell on and retiring from the U.S. Army as a major general. His son Leon Claude Covell Jr. (November 30, 1914 – September 30, 1995) was a supply officer in the U.S. Naval Reserve who served during both World War II and the Korean War, retiring as a commander.
