= Coconino =

Coconino may refer to:

- Coconino Community College
- Coconino County, Arizona
- Coconino High School
- Coconino National Forest
- Coconino Plateau
- Coconino Sandstone
- USS Coconino County (LST-603)
