= ARM Felipe Xicoténcatl =

ARM Felipe Xicoténcatl may refer to one of the following patrol vessels of the Mexican Navy:

- ARM Felipe Xicoténcatl (P115), the former American Auk-class minesweeper USS Scoter (AM-381); acquired by the Mexican Navy on 19 September 1972 as Gutiérrez Zamora (C84); later reclassified as G16; later renamed Melchor Ocampo; renamed Felipe Xicoténcatl (P115), 1993; retired from service by 2004
- ARM General Felipe Xicoténcatl (C53), the former American Admirable-class minesweeper USS Scuffle (AM-298); acquired by the Mexican Navy on 1 October 1962; sunk off the coast of Cozumel, 1999; stricken, 2000
