= USCGC Tahoe =

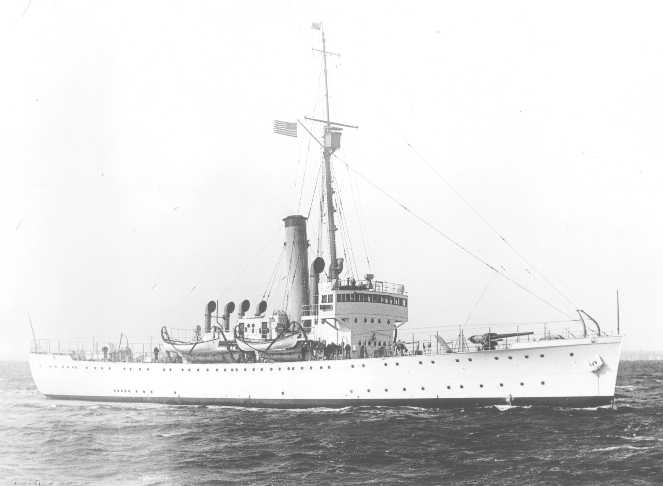
- USCGC Tahoe; underway, pre-World War II.

History

United States
- Name: USCGC Tahoe (1928)
- Namesake: Lake Tahoe
- Builder: Bethlehem Shipbuilding Corporation
- Laid down: 5 December 1927
- Launched: 12 June 1928
- Commissioned: 18 November 1928
- Decommissioned: 30 April 1941
- Fate: Transferred to Royal Navy, 30 April 1941

United Kingdom
- Name: HMS Fishguard (Y59)
- Commissioned: 30 April 1941
- Fate: Returned to USCG, 27 March 1946

United States
- Name: USCGC Tahoe
- Fate: Sold, 24 October 1947

General characteristics
- Class & type: Lake-class cutter (USCG); Banff-class sloop (RN)
- Displacement: 2,075 long tons (2,108 t)
- Length: 250 ft (76 m)
- Beam: 42 ft (13 m)
- Draft: 12 ft 11 in (3.94 m)
- Propulsion: 1 × General Electric turbine-driven 3,350 shp (2,500 kW) electric motor, 2 boilers
- Speed: 14.8 kn (27.4 km/h; 17.0 mph) cruising; 17.5 kn (32.4 km/h; 20.1 mph) maximum
- Complement: 97
- Armament: 1 × 5 inch gun; 1 × 3 inch gun; 2 × 6-pounder (57 mm)

USCGC Tahoe was a Lake-class cutter of the United States Coast Guard launched on 12 June 1928 and commissioned on 8 November 1928. After 13 years of service with the Coast Guard, she was transferred to the Royal Navy as part of the Lend-Lease Act.

== Career ==
=== US Coast Guard – Tahoe ===
After commissioning in November 1928 with Commander Leon C. Covell in command, the Tahoe was homeported in San Francisco and assigned to the Bering Sea Patrol.

=== Royal Navy – Fishguard ===
As part of the Lend-Lease Act she was transferred to the Royal Navy where she was renamed HMS Fishguard (Y59) and commissioned on 12 May 1941. In May 1944, the crew of Fishguard boarded U-852 and captured her crew after she was damaged by British aircraft. At the end of the war, in March 1946, Fishguard was returned to the USCG.

=== US Coast Guard – Tahoe (post war) ===
Upon her return to the USCG, her recommissioning was cancelled and she was sold in October 1947.

== See also ==
- List of United States Coast Guard cutters
