= USCGC Shoshone =

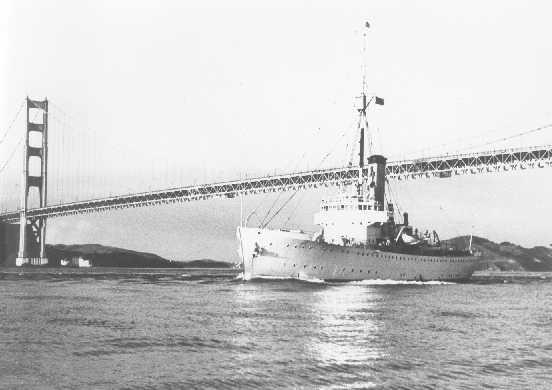
- USCGC Shoshone under way, passing under the Golden Gate Bridge, pre-World War II

History

United States
- Name: USCGC Shoshone
- Namesake: Shoshone
- Builder: General Engineering and Drydock Company
- Launched: 11 September 1930
- Commissioned: 10 January 1931

United Kingdom
- Name: HMS Landguard (Y56)
- Launched: 11 Sep 1930
- Commissioned: 20 May 1941
- Fate: Sold 6 October 1949 and scrapped

General characteristics
- Class & type: Lake-class cutter (USCG); Banff-class sloop (RN)
- Displacement: 2,075 long tons (2,108 t)
- Length: 250 ft (76 m)
- Beam: 42 ft (13 m)
- Draft: 12 ft 11 in (3.94 m)
- Propulsion: 1 × General Electric turbine-driven 3,350 shp (2,500 kW) electric motor, 2 boilers
- Speed: 14.8 kn (27.4 km/h; 17.0 mph) cruising; 17.5 kn (32.4 km/h; 20.1 mph) maximum
- Complement: 97
- Armament: 1 × 5 inch gun; 1 × 3 inch gun; 2 × 6-pounder (57 mm)

USCGC Shoshone was a Lake-class cutter of the United States Coast Guard launched on 12 November 1932 and commissioned on 6 January 1933.

== Career ==
=== Coast Guard - Shoshone ===
After being commissioned 10 January 1931 with Captain Leon C. Covell in command, Shoshone was homeported in San Francisco, California and participated in the Bering Sea Patrol. The first hispanic officer in the Coast Guard, Henry Frederick Garcia was assigned to the Shoshone in 1936.

=== Royal Navy - Landguard ===
After being transferred to the British Royal Navy the newly named HMS Landguard (Y56) was commissioned on 20 May 1941. On 8 February 1943, she rescued 48 people from the British merchant Mary Slessor which struck a mine laid by U-118 in the Strait of Gibraltar. On 6 October 1949 she was sold and scrapped.

== See also ==
- List of United States Coast Guard cutters
