= Henry Frederick Garcia =

United States Coast Guardsman

Henry Frederick Garcia (later known as) Montegue Frederick Garfield
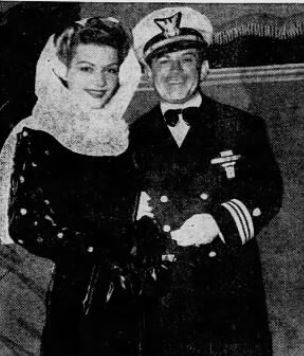
- Newspaper photograph showing Lt. Cmdr. Henry Garcia in his dress blue uniform with Hollywood starlet Mary Moore. (Los Angeles Times)
- Born: Henry Frederick Garcia; February 17, 1903; San Juan, Puerto Rico
- Died: June 26, 1966 (aged 63) San Diego, California
- Branch: United States Army; United States Coast Guard
- Rank: Captain
- Commands: USCGC Morris; USS Annapolis; USCGC Campbell
- Education: U.S. Naval Academy

Henry Frederick Garcia (later known as Montegue Frederick Garfield) was the first Hispanic commissioned officer in the United States Coast Guard.

== Early life ==
Garcia was born 17 February 1903 in El Morro, San Juan, Puerto Rico to a U.S. Army Quartermaster Corps Major Enrique Garcia. He graduated from the U.S. Naval Academy in 1924 and was commissioned into the U.S. Army serving in the field artillery until 1928. He was then commissioned into the Coast Guard.

== Coast Guard career ==
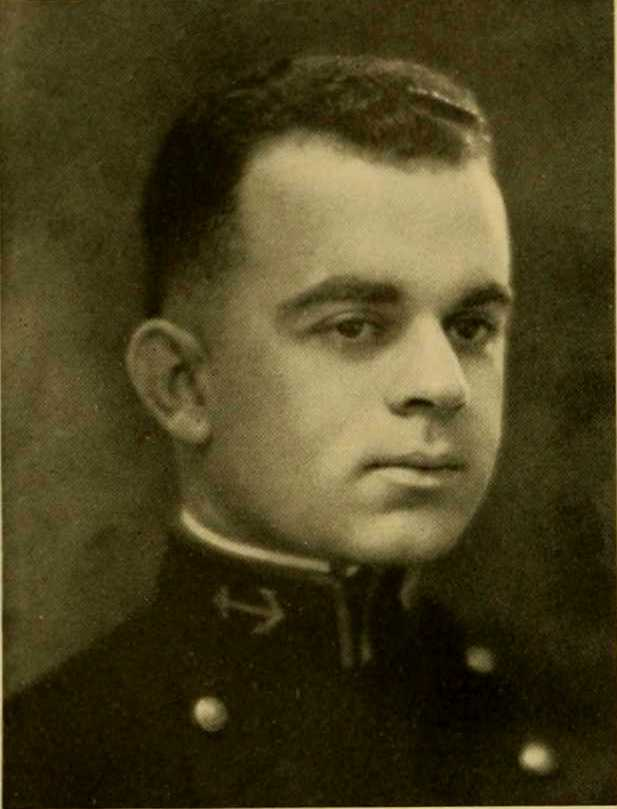
Photo of Midshipman Henry Frederick Garcia in the yearbook of the United States Naval Academy. (U.S. Navy)

Ensign Garcia was an excellent shot, getting his name engraved as the top shot in 1930 on the National Rifle Association's President's Match trophy.

He served on several cutters doing anti-rum running duty during Prohibition in his early career. By 1936, he was assigned to USCGC Shoshone based at Oakland, California. One of Shoshone's missions was to deliver fuel and supplies to Howland Island in 1937. This would have been a stop for aviation pioneer Amelia Earhart had she not been lost before that.

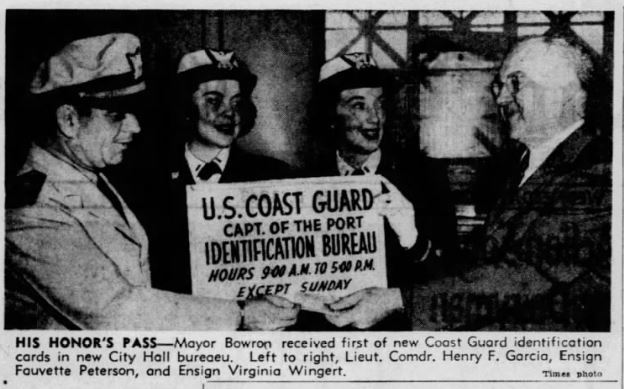
World War II photo showing Lt. Cmdr. Garcia with two Coast Guard SPARs and Los Angeles mayor Fletcher Bowron. Garcia presents Brown with a Coast Guard identification card from the Identification Bureau of the Coast Guard Captain of the Port of Los Angeles. (Los Angeles Times)

In 1939, Lieutenant Garcia was given command of USCGC Morris based in Seward, Alaska. During his command, Morris completed a difficult rescue of trappers on Tugidak Island, searching through a 48-hour gale in March 1939. In June, his crew would monitor the Mount Veniaminof eruption and ensure the safety of Perryville, Alaska. Immediately after, his crew rescued the crew of Schooner Pandora, and expedition to find the Northwest Passage led by Dr. Homer Flint Kellems. Pandora had run aground and the crew was rescued from Kayak Island.

During World War II, Garcia served as the executive officer of USCG Base Charleston where he and a crew captured the Italian freighter Villaperosa in March 1941. The crew of Villaperosa had been interned and was attempting to sabotage their engines.

Promoted to lieutenant commander, Garcia was assigned first to the Port of Baltimore, Maryland and then as assistant captain of the port for security in Los Angeles, California. During this assignment, the port security was almost entirely run by the SPARS - an all female Coast Guard auxiliary. During his time in Los Angeles he changed his name to Montegue Frederick Garfield.

He was then sent to Galveston, Texas and now a full commander, assumed command of USS Annapolis, which served on escort duty until the patrol frigate was beached near Seattle to be scrapped. His final command was USCGC Campbell based again in Charleston.

His later assignments were as chief of public affairs in New Orleans at the USCG Eighth District and chief of intelligence in San Francisco at the USCG Twelfth District. Garfield retired in 1956 as a captain.

After retiring, Garfield moved to San Diego, California and worked in real estate. He died 26 June 1966.
