= USS Clearwater County =

US naval vessel (1944–1957)

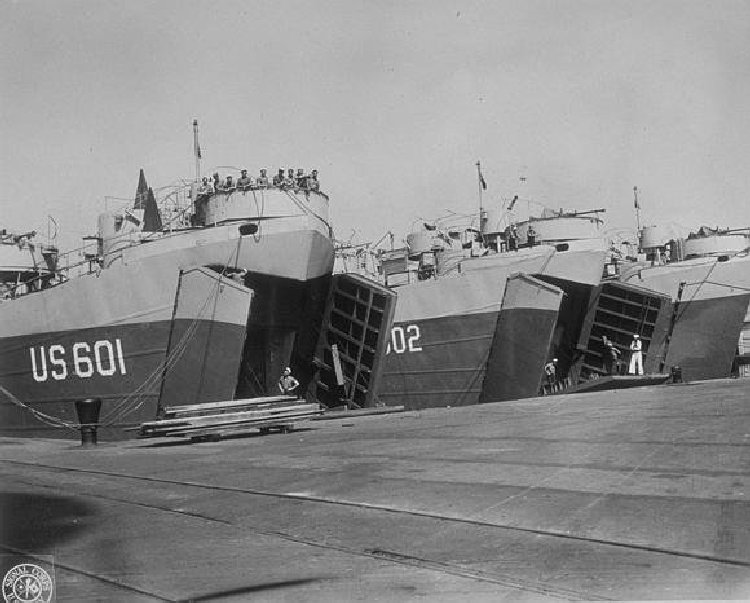
- LST-601, LST-602, and LST-603, at the Naval Amphibious Base Little Creek, Virginia on 10 May 1944

History

United States
- Name: USS LST-602, later USS Clearwater County
- Namesake: Clearwater County, Idaho, and Clearwater County, Minnesota
- Builder: Chicago Bridge and Iron Company, Seneca, Illinois
- Laid down: 23 October 1943
- Launched: 9 March 1944
- Commissioned: 31 March 1944
- Decommissioned: 1946
- Recommissioned: 1950
- Renamed: USS Clearwater County (LST-602), 1 July 1955
- Stricken: 1 May 1972
- Honours and awards: 1 battle star for World War II; 3 battle stars for the Korean War
- Fate: Transferred to United States Air Force 1957
- Notes: Operated by U.S. Air Force 1957–1969; Transferred to Maritime Administration 1969; Donated to Mexico, 30 May 1972

Mexico
- Name: Manzanillo
- Acquired: 30 May 1972
- Decommissioned: 16 November 2011
- Identification: Hull number: IA-02

General characteristics
- Class & type: LST-542-class tank landing ship
- Displacement: 1,780 long tons (1,809 t) light; 3,540 long tons (3,597 t) full
- Length: 328 ft (100 m)
- Beam: 50 ft (15 m)
- Draft: Unloaded : 2 ft 4 in (0.71 m) forward; 7 ft 6 in (2.29 m) aft; Loaded : 8 ft 2 in (2.49 m) forward; 14 ft 1 in (4.29 m) aft
- Propulsion: 2 × General Motors 12-567 diesel engines, two shafts, twin rudders
- Speed: 12 knots (22 km/h; 14 mph)
- Boats & landing craft carried: 2 LCVPs
- Troops: 140 officers and enlisted men
- Complement: 8–10 officers, 100–115 enlisted men
- Armament: 1 × single 3-inch/50-caliber gun mount; 8 × 40 mm guns; 12 × 20 mm guns

USS Clearwater County (LST-602), originally USS LST-602, was a United States Navy LST-542-class tank landing ship built during World War II and in commission from 1944 to 1946 and from 1950 to ca. 1957. Named after Clearwater County, Idaho, and Clearwater County, Minnesota, she was the only U.S. Navy vessel to bear the name. It was transferred to the Mexican Navy.

== Construction and commissioning ==
LST-602 was laid down on 23 October 1943 at Seneca, Illinois, by the Chicago Bridge and Iron Company. She was launched on 9 March 1944, sponsored by Mrs. Adele R. Ziehm, and commissioned on 31 March 1944.

== Service history ==
During World War II, LST-602 was assigned to the European Theater of Operations and participated in Operation Dragoon, the invasion of southern France, in August and September 1944. In 1946 she was decommissioned/

When the Korean War broke out, LST-602 was recommissioned in 1950 and performed service in the Korean Theater from 26 November 1951 to 25 July 1952 and from 19 July 1953 to 26 February 1954. She participated in the following Korean War campaigns:

- Second Korean Winter (22 December 1951 to 14 January 1952, 22 February to 11 March 1952, and 20 to 28 March 1952)
- Korea, Summer-Fall 1953 (27 July 1953).

On 1 July 1955, LST-602 was renamed USS Clearwater County (LST-602). She remained in U.S. Navy service until 1957.

== Post-U.S. Navy career ==
Clearwater County was operated by the United States Air Force from September 1957 to September 1969, when she was transferred to the temporary custody of the Maritime Administration. She was struck from the Naval Vessel Register on 1 May 1972 and given to Mexico on 30 May 1972.

In the Mexican Navy, she served as ARM Manzanillo (A-402). Manzanillo helped during operations to help Hurricane Katrina victims in 2005. On 16 November 2011 she was decommissioned.

== Awards and honors ==
LST-602 earned one battle star for World War II service and two battle stars for Korean War service.
