= USS Weehawken (CM-12) =

1920 car ferry later converted to a mine layer

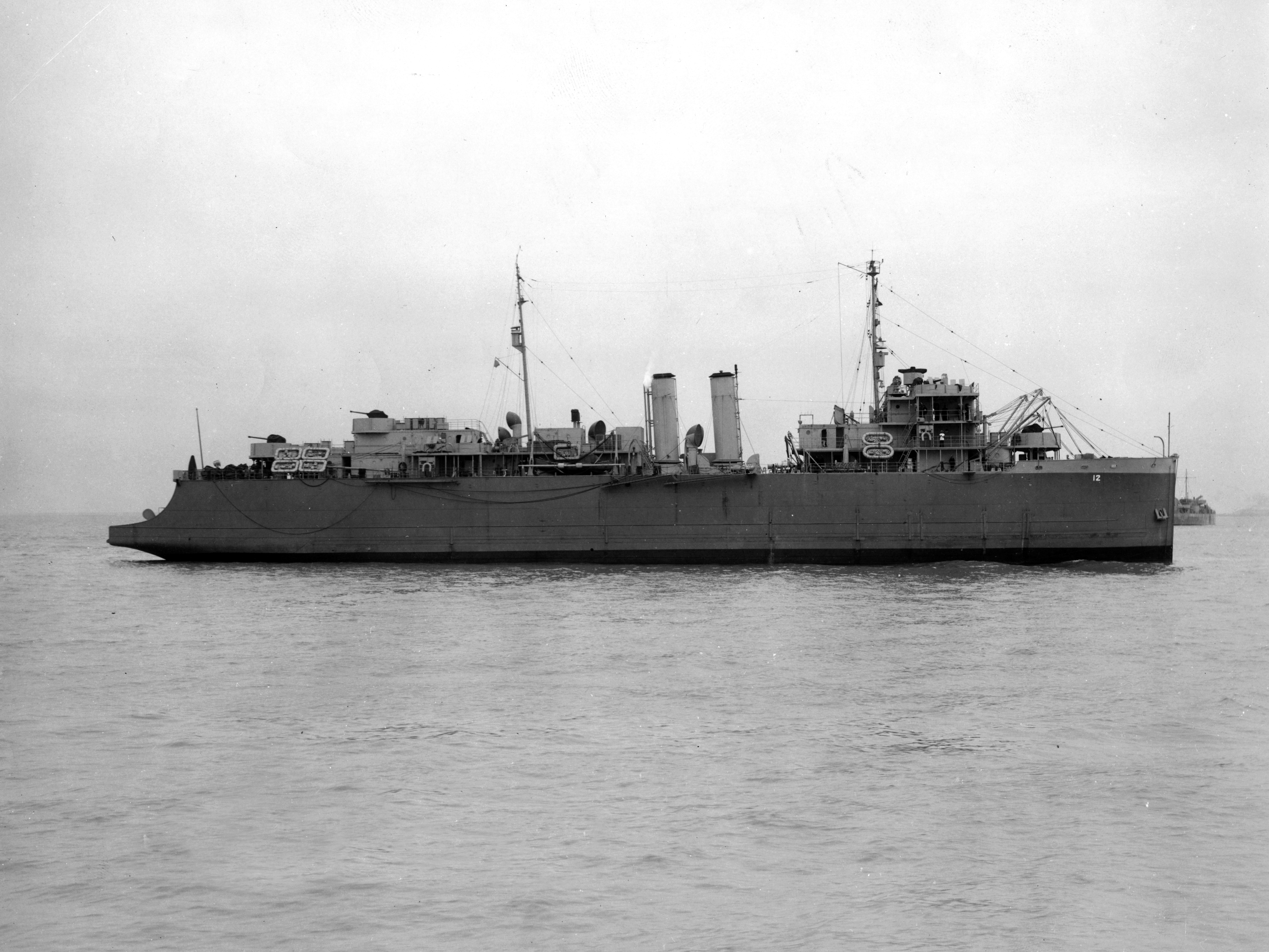

History

United States
- Name: USS Weehawken
- Namesake: Weehawken, New Jersey
- Builder: William Cramp & Sons, Philadelphia
- Yard number: 504
- Launched: 6 November 1920, as SS Estrada Palma
- Acquired: 15 June 1942
- Commissioned: 30 September 1942
- Decommissioned: 11 December 1945
- Renamed: Weehawken (CM-12), 18 July 1942
- Stricken: 3 January 1946
- Honors and awards: 2 battle stars (World War II)
- Fate: Damaged by typhoon, October 1945, and later scrapped

General characteristics
- Type: Commercial car ferry / Minelayer
- Displacement: 6,525 long tons (6,630 t)
- Length: 350 ft (110 m)
- Beam: 57 ft (17 m)
- Draft: 17 ft 6 in (5.33 m)
- Installed power: 181 Nhp, 2,700 bhp (2,013 kW)
- Propulsion: 2 × William Cramp & Sons 3-cylinder triple expansion; 2 shafts
- Speed: 12 knots (22 km/h; 14 mph)
- Complement: 290 officers and enlisted
- Armament: 3 × 3-inch/50-caliber guns; 4 × 20 mm guns

USS Weehawken (CM-12) was originally SS Estrada Palma – a car ferry built in 1920 by William Cramp & Sons of Philadelphia. It was acquired by the United States Navy on 15 June 1942; renamed Weehawken on 18 July 1942; converted to a minelayer by the Bethlehem Steel Co. at Hoboken, New Jersey; designated CM-12; and commissioned on 30 September 1942.

== World War II North Africa operations ==
On 6 October 1942, USS Weehawken moved to Bayonne, New Jersey, and, two days later, to Tompkinsville, New York. On the 10th, she departed the latter port for the Naval Mine Depot at Yorktown, Virginia. She arrived in Yorktown the following day and began drills and exercises in the lower Chesapeake Bay. The minelayer stood out of the Chesapeake Bay on 5 November, bound for New York, and arrived at Brooklyn, New York, the following day. A week later, she put to sea with Mine Division (MinDiv) 50 and a convoy headed for French Morocco.

The minelayer dropped anchor in Casablanca harbor on 1 December. She remained in port until the 27th when she left to lay a defensive minefield off Casablanca. Weehawken returned to port that evening and then repeated the procedure the following day. On New Year's Eve, the Luftwaffe ushered in 1943 by subjecting Casablanca and the ships assembled there to a night of intermittent air raids. Fortunately, Weehawken suffered no damage during those raids and during the encore performed the following evening. Between 6 and 10 January, she made a round-trip voyage to Gibraltar and back to deliver 450 mines and 500 feet of mine track, minelaying equipment. Upon her return, the warship remained at Casablanca until 20 January, when she sailed for New York.

== Return to Stateside ==
She arrived in New York with the convoy on 7 February and sailed the following day for Hampton Roads, Virginia. The ship anchored in the roadstead late on the 9th, unloaded mines at Yorktown, Virginia, on the 10th, and entered the Norfolk Navy Yard on the 11th. Following a seven-week repair period, Weehawken exited the shipyard on St. Patrick's Day 1943 and moored at the Naval Operating Base for almost a week before returning to Yorktown, Virginia, on 23 March to load mines. For the next 11 weeks, Weehawken conducted minelaying drills and gunnery exercises in the lower reaches of the Chesapeake Bay. Throughout that span of time, she returned to Yorktown and Norfolk frequently for liberty, provisions, repairs, and the like.

== Supporting the invasion of Italy ==
On 9 June, the minelayer weighed anchor and departed Yorktown, Virginia, and headed for New York. There, she joined a convoy bound for Algeria. During the crossing, a German U-boat apparently attacked the convoy on 22 June, for SS Gulf Stream sank rapidly after suffering an explosion. However, Weehawken arrived in Oran safely on U.S. Independence Day 1943. Two days later, she joined a convoy off Oran and set a course for Sicily where she arrived on the 11th, the day following the initial Allied invasion.

Throughout that day and most of the next, she laid defensive minefields around the invasion beaches at Gela on the southern coast of the island. On both days, the Luftwaffe appeared and dropped their explosive greetings to the invasion force. Between 2150 and 2345 on the 11th, Weehawken's group underwent a series of heavy attacks; however, the minelayer came through unscathed save for some fragments from a stick of bombs which exploded just off her starboard bow. On the 12th, she continued operations off Gela; and, around 1740 in the afternoon, German planes returned. The ship's war diary recorded these as "Stuka's," which indicates that they were probably Junkers Ju 87 dive bombers. After making a great deal of noise, both the US Navy and the German Luftwaffe emerged from that altercation unharmed.

Later that evening, Weehawken departed Sicily to return to North Africa. After stops at Bizerte, Tunisia, and Algeria, she returned to Oran on 17 July. Five days later, the minelayer shifted to Mers El Kébir where she remained until 6 September when she sailed for Bizerte. The ship stayed at the Tunisian port from 8 to 14 September and returned to Mers El Kébir on the 17th.

== Assignment to Pacific Theatre operations ==
On 20 April 1944, USS Weehawken received word that MinDiv 50 had been dissolved and that she was to be assigned to the U.S. Pacific Fleet to transport cargo, mines, and equipment to Pacific bases. On the 30th, she completed the availability which she had been undergoing at Norfolk, Virginia, since the 15th and returned to Yorktown, Virginia. She loaded mines and cargo from 7 to 9 May and then cleared Hampton Roads on the 11th.

The minelayer entered the Panama Canal on 20 May, reported for duty with the U.S. Pacific Fleet, and joined Service Squadron 6. Completing her transit of the canal in the same day, she continued her voyage up the west coast to San Diego, California, where she arrived on 1 June. Four days later, Weehawken headed west toward Hawaii. After arriving in Pearl Harbor on 14 June, she unloaded her cargo and spent 11 days at Oahu before heading back to the west coast on 25 June.

On Independence Day 1944, the warship reached San Francisco, California, and immediately began alterations at the General Engineering & Drydock Co. located at Alameda, California. She completed the modifications – which included the removal of mine tracks from the after section of her mine deck – on 1 August. After embarking passengers and loading cargo, she departed San Francisco on 8 August and shaped a course for the South Pacific. During the last two days of August, she passed through the Solomon Islands and stopped at Florida Island and Tulagi from 31 August to 5 September to disembark passengers and unload some cargo. She made Espiritu Santo in the New Hebrides on 8 September and began unloading the remainder of her cargo. She embarked another group of passengers and got underway on 10 September for Pearl Harbor. After a 12-day voyage, she passed through the anti-submarine nets at Oahu and moored in Pearl Harbor.

== Central Pacific operations ==
She spent eight days in Hawaii before embarking upon an extended voyage to the Central Pacific during which she visited a number of islands and bases. On 1 and 2 October, she embarked passengers bound for Saipan in the recently won Mariana Islands and, on the latter date, passed Diamond Head and set course for the Central Pacific. Weehawken made a brief overnight stop at Eniwetok Atoll in the Marshall Islands on 13 and 14 October and made Saipan on the 18th. Between 18 and 28 October, she unloaded mines, embarked passengers, and loaded cargo. From 28 October to 1 November, she steamed from Saipan to Kossol Roads – in the Palau Islands – where she embarked additional passengers and resumed her voyage. On 4 November, she sailed into the lagoon at Ulithi Atoll in the western Carolines. She spent the next two weeks at the atoll.

After disembarking her passengers and riding out a typhoon, Weehawken departed Ulithi on the 18th bound for the Marianas. She reached Guam the next day, took on passengers, and departed again by the 21st. Two days later, the minelayer reentered Ulithi. Early in December, she made a round-trip voyage to the Palaus, returning to Ulithi on the 10th. Five days later, the warship put to sea with a convoy bound for Saipan. She arrived in Saipan on the 17th and remained there five days before returning to sea – bound via Eniwetok to Pearl Harbor where she arrived on 8 January 1945.

Four days after her arrival, Weehawken shifted berths to the navy yard to begin another series of alterations and repairs. On 21 February, the ship stood out of Pearl Harbor once again and headed west. It arrived in Eniwetok on 4 March and, the following day, took leave of the convoy, and departed Eniwetok for Ulithi in company with Facility (AM-233). The two warships entered the lagoon at Ulithi on the 11th, and Weehawken began duty as a tender for motor minesweepers.

Almost a month later on 5 April, the minelayer exited the anchorage at Ulithi in convoy with Monadnock (CM-9), Mona Island (ARG-9), and Clemson (APD-31). The convoy passed Okinawa during the mid-morning hours of 10 April and anchored in Kerama Retto just before 1400. Weehawken immediately began providing logistic support, tender, and other services to the minesweeping units operating in the 10-day-old occupation of Okinawa. For the next three months, she remained anchored in Kerama Retto except for two occasions – 4 June and 11 June – when she left the anchorage to evade typhoons. In both cases, she resumed her duties in Kerama Retto immediately after the storm passed.

== Under attack by Japanese aircraft ==
Over that span of time, frequent air alerts called her crew to general quarters as Japanese kamikazes attempted to drive the American Navy from Okinawa. Though her gunners frequently fired on enemy planes and witnessed their spectacular crashes into other ships, Weehawken continued to lead a charmed life. On 28 April, a kamikaze bore in on her; but, at the last minute, anti-aircraft fire from a nearby destroyer persuaded him to seek easier prey. Instead, he crashed into Pinkney (APH-2) – anchored nearby – and Weehawken dispatched rescue parties and medical assistance to the mortally wounded hospital evacuation transport. Three days later, she was called upon to render medical assistance again when a suicide plane smashed into minelayer Terror (CM-5). Her gunners tried unsuccessfully to bring down two other kamikazes, one which struck St. George (AV-16) on 6 May and another which exploded on Curtiss (AV-4) on 21 June. (In the latter instance, Weehawken rushed fire and rescue parties to the aid of the stricken warship.)

On 7 July 1945, Weehawken stood out of the Kerama Retto roadstead and anchored in Buckner Bay. There, she resumed her support duties for the minesweeping forces. Ten days later, she departed Buckner Bay with a mixed force of auxiliaries and motor minesweepers for a brief operation near Unken Ko. She returned to Buckner Bay early in the morning of 22 July and remained there, either anchored or moored near Tsuken Shima, through the end of the war and into September 1945.

== Damaged by Typhoon Louise - 9–12 October 1945 ==
On 16 September, a typhoon hit the Okinawa area. Late that evening, Weehawken tried to get underway and to take on the crews of Coast Guard cutters moored nearby. During the operation, she collided with several of the cutters and with buoy tender Woodbine (WAGL-289). After several additional collisions with the cutters and Woodbine, Weehawken began to drag anchor toward Tsuken Shima at 2330. At 0440 on 17 September, she struck a reef off Tsuken Shima. Fortunately, the typhoon began to subside, and she was towed out of shoal water later that day by Current (ARS-22). She suffered little damage in that scrape and resumed her duties off Tsuken Shima soon thereafter.

Following three weeks of routine operations, Weehawken battled another typhoon. Early in the morning of 9 October, steadily increasing winds forced her to use her engines to relieve the strain on her anchor chains. Through the morning, the winds rose steadily to gale force and, by 1400, reached 80 knots (92 mph; 148 km/h). Weehawken fought the raging seas; but, at 1522, the chain to the mooring buoy snapped in two. While playing out the port anchor chain to 95 fathoms and making precautionary preparations to abandon ship, the minelayer collided with a net tender broadside to port. The two ships parted with no apparent damage, and Weehawken's crewmen continued their struggle to keep her headed into the wind and relieve the strain on the anchor chain.

In spite of their efforts, she continued to drag anchor toward shoal water. At 1550, she collided with LCI(L)-31, but again escaped without major damage. By 1600, the winds reached 125 knots (144 mph; 232 km/h); and Weehawken sailed out of control – broadside to the wind – and dragged anchor. At 1700, she ran hard aground and took on a list. She immediately flooded compartments below to return to even keel and rested firmly on the bottom. There, she remained through the night battered by wind and sea and with her crew ready to abandon ship at a moment's notice.

The following morning, the winds began to slacken and the sea to abate. Between 10 and 12 October, the minelayer unloaded the bulk of her provisions and transferred the majority of her crew to USS Benson (APA-120). On 16 October, her hull began to break in two, but a skeleton crew remained on board salvaging equipment. On the 31st, a board of inspection and survey convened in Weehawken to look her over and found her hull to be a complete loss. The board recommended that she be decommissioned, stripped, and destroyed. Accordingly, Weehawken was decommissioned on 11 December 1945, and her name was struck from the Navy List on 3 January 1946.

== Awards ==
USS Weehawken earned two battle stars during World War II.
