= USS Bangor =

Tacoma-class patrol frigate

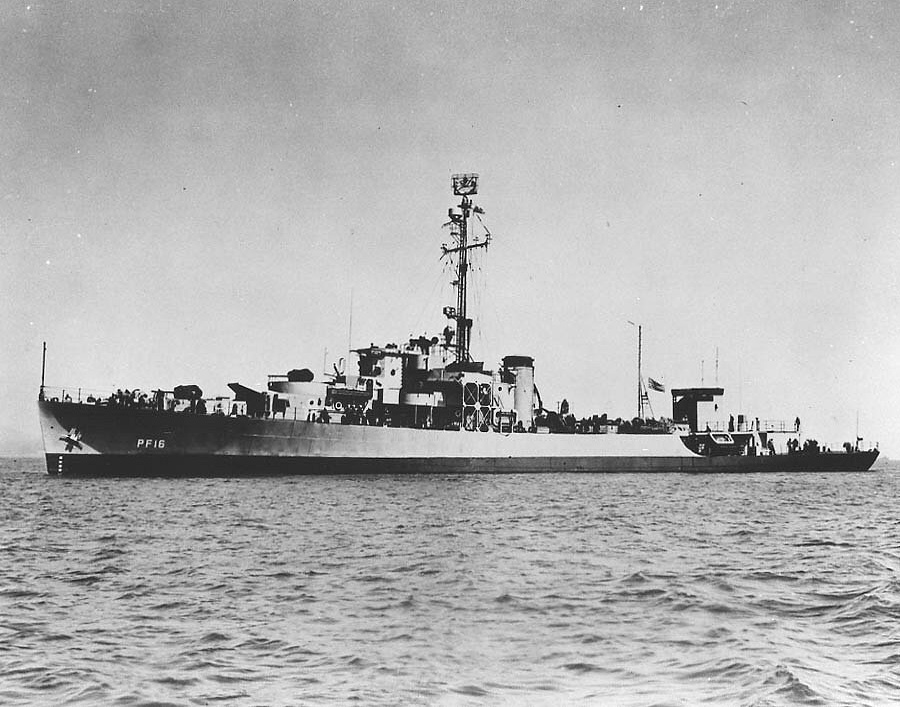
- USS Bangor

History

United States
- Name: Bangor (PG-124)
- Namesake: City of Bangor, Maine
- Reclassified: PF-16, 15 April 1943
- Builder: American Ship Building Company, Lorain, Ohio
- Yard number: 843
- Laid down: 20 May 1943
- Launched: 6 November 1943
- Sponsored by: Mrs. Ruth R. Hutchins
- Commissioned: 22 November 1944
- Decommissioned: 15 April 1946
- Fate: Transferred to US Coast Guard 15 April 1946
- Acquired: Returned by US Coast Guard 16 August 1946
- Stricken: 23 April 1947
- Fate: Sold to Mexican Navy, 24 November 1947

United States
- Name: Bangor
- Acquired: 15 April 1946 from US Navy
- Commissioned: 15 April 1946
- Decommissioned: 16 August 1946
- Fate: Returned to US Navy 16 August 1946

Mexico
- Name: General José María Morelos
- Namesake: José María Morelos
- Acquired: 24 November 1947
- Renamed: Golfo de Tehuantepec
- Namesake: Gulf of Tehuantepec
- Fate: Scrapped, 1964

General characteristics
- Class & type: Tacoma-class frigate
- Displacement: 1,430 long tons (1,453 t) light; 2,415 long tons (2,454 t) full
- Length: 303 ft 11 in (92.63 m)
- Beam: 37 ft 11 in (11.56 m)
- Draft: 13 ft 8 in (4.17 m)
- Propulsion: 2 × 5,500 shp (4,101 kW) turbines; 3 boilers; 2 shafts
- Speed: 20 knots (37 km/h; 23 mph)
- Complement: 190
- Armament: 3 × 3"/50 dual purpose guns (3x1); 4 x 40 mm guns (2×2); 9 × 20 mm guns (9×1); 1 × Hedgehog anti-submarine mortar; 8 × Y-gun depth charge projectors; 2 × Depth charge tracks

USS Bangor (PF-16) was a United States Navy Tacoma-class frigate in commission from 1944 to 1946. Thus far, she has been the only U.S. Navy ship named for Bangor, Maine. She later served in United States Coast Guard as USCGC Bangor and in the Mexican Navy as ARM General José María Morelos and ARM Golfo de Tehuantepec.

== Construction and commissioning ==
Bangor was laid down on 20 May 1943, at Lorain, Ohio, by the American Shipbuilding Company under a Maritime Commission contract (MC hull 1482). She was launched on 6 November 1943, sponsored by Mrs. Ruth R. Hutchins, and delivered to the Navy at New Orleans, Louisiana, on 25 August 1944. After fitting out at New Orleans, she was commissioned there on 22 November 1944.

== Service history ==
=== US Navy, 1944–1946 ===
Bangor reported for shakedown training off Bermuda on 3 December 1944, and, after four weeks of intensive drills, set a course for the Norfolk Navy Yard at Portsmouth, Virginia, for post-shakedown repairs. On 21 January 1945, Bangor joined Task Force (TF) 67 on convoy escort duty and, two days later, took station in the antisubmarine screen of a large convoy bound for North Africa. The transatlantic voyage was routine and the ships anchored off Oran, Algeria, on 8 February 1945.

Bangor returned to the United States with another convoy. A German U-boat attacked the Allied ships two days out of Oran. Bangor joined the other escorts in a coordinated depth charge attack, but without success. Bangor made one more round trip transatlantic voyage without incident before undergoing repairs at Bayonne, New Jersey. She resumed her escort duties on 22 April 1945 and joined an Oran-bound convoy out of New York City. Bangor anchored at Mers el Kebir, Algeria, on 9 May 1945 and there received the news that Germany had surrendered. She got underway on 17 May 1945 with another returning convoy.

Bangor completed repairs at the Philadelphia Navy Yard in Philadelphia, Pennsylvania, early in June 1945 and then headed for the Panama Canal Zone, where she arrived on 21 June 1945. For the next month, she conducted training exercises with submarines off the Perlas Islands in Panama Bay. In mid-July 1945, Bangor set course for San Pedro, California, to prepare for duty in the Western Pacific in the war against Japan, but the war ended on 15 August 1945 while she was in drydock at Seattle, Washington. Her repairs were completed early in September 1945.

Slated along with her sister ship USS Annapolis (PF-15) to be the last two of 30 Tacoma-class patrol frigates transferred secretly to the Soviet Navy at Cold Bay in the Territory of Alaska as a part of Project Hula, Bangor was underway in company with Annapolis en route Cold Bay when an order came on 5 September 1945 to suspend all further transfers of ships to the Soviet Union. Bangor and Annapolis proceeded to Cold Bay anyway, where they took aboard American personnel requiring transportation to the continental United States, then steamed to Seattle to disembark them. Bangor and Annapolis were the only two patrol frigates scheduled for transfer under Project Hula not to be transferred.

=== US Coast Guard, 1946 ===
Bangor next reported to Bremerton, Washington, to serve as a rescue and weather ship for the United States Coast Guard. On 15 April 1946, she was decommissioned by the Navy and recommissioned by the Coast Guard as one of 18 patrol frigates used for weather reporting. Bangor rotated with other ships on weather stations east of the Hawaiian Islands. Generally remaining at sea for six weeks at a time, she also provided navigational information to any aircraft or surface vessel requiring assistance and assumed search and rescue duties for vessels in distress.

As 1946 passed, small seaplane tenders (AVP) replaced the patrol frigates. The Coast Guard decommissioned Bangor on 16 August 1946 and returned her to the Navy. Bangor was then declared excess to the Navy's needs, and her name was struck from the Navy list on 23 April 1947.

=== Mexican Navy, 1947–1964 ===
On 24 November 1947, the United States sold Bangor to Mexico, which renamed her ARM General José María Morelos for service in the Mexican Navy. Later renamed ARM Golfo de Tehuantepec, the ship was scrapped in 1964.
