= USS Facility =

Minesweeper of the United States Navy

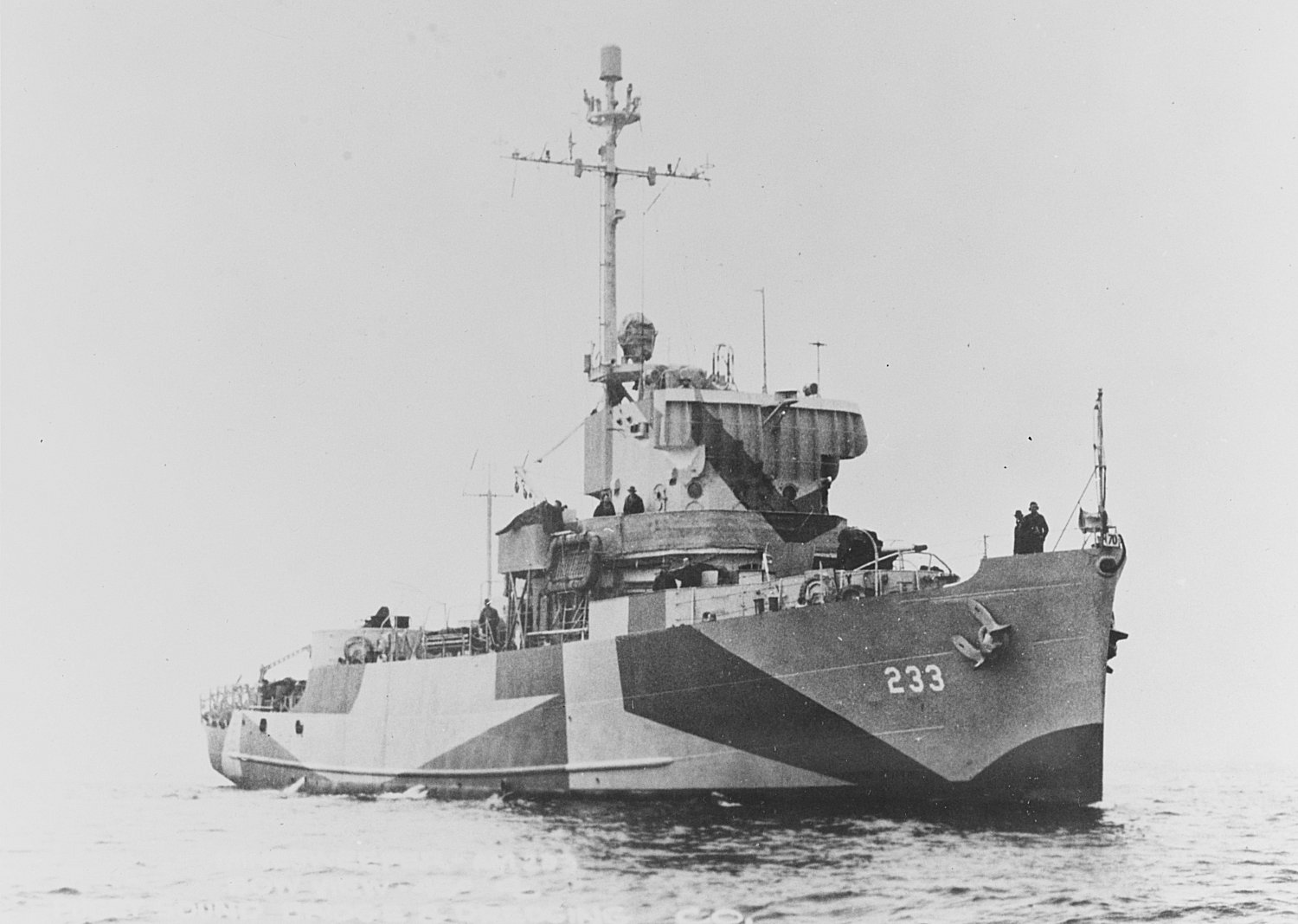
- Facility off Seattle, Washington, 21 November 1944.

History

United States
- Name: USS PCE-906
- Builder: Puget Sound Bridge and Dredging Company, Seattle
- Laid down: 29 March 1944
- Renamed: USS Facility (AM-233)
- Launched: 22 June 1944
- Commissioned: 29 November 1944
- Decommissioned: 11 September 1946
- Reclassified: MSF-233, 7 February 1955
- Stricken: 1 May 1962
- Fate: Transferred to Mexican Navy, 2 October 1962

History

Mexico
- Name: ARM DM-04
- Acquired: 2 October 1962
- Fate: unknown

General characteristics
- Class & type: PCE-905-class patrol craft
- Class & type: Admirable-class minesweeper, September 1943
- Displacement: 650 long tons (660 t)
- Length: 184 ft 6 in (56.24 m)
- Beam: 33 ft (10 m)
- Draft: 9 ft 9 in (2.97 m)
- Propulsion: 2 × Cooper Bessemer GSB-8 diesel engines, 1,710 shp (1,280 kW); National Supply Co. single reduction gear; 2 shafts
- Speed: 15 knots (28 km/h)
- Complement: 104
- Armament: 1 × 3"/50 caliber (76 mm) DP gun; 2 × twin Bofors 40 mm guns; 1 × Hedgehog anti-submarine mortar; 2 × Depth charge tracks

Service record
- Part of: U.S. Pacific Fleet (1944–1946); Mexican Navy (from 1962)
- Operations: Battle of Okinawa
- Awards: 3 Battle stars

USS Facility (AM-233) was an Admirable-class minesweeper built for the United States Navy during World War II. The ship was ordered and laid down as PCE-905-class patrol craft USS PCE-906 but was renamed and reclassified before her June 1944 launch as Facility (AM-233). After earning three battle stars for service in the Pacific during World War II, she was decommissioned in September 1946 and placed in reserve. While in reserve, Facility was reclassified as MSF-233 in February 1955 but never reactivated. In October 1962, she was sold to the Mexican Navy and renamed ARM DM-04. Her ultimate fate is not reported in secondary sources; she may have been out of service by April 1973 when another member of the Admirable class was acquired by the Mexican Navy and given the name DM-04.

== U.S. Navy career ==
Initially named PCE-906 and classed as a PCE-905-class patrol craft, the ship was laid down on 29 March 1944 at the Puget Sound Bridge and Dredging Company of Seattle. Renamed Facility and converted to an Admirable-class minesweeper, she was launched by sponsor Miss Clara Lee Davis on 22 June 1944. After completion, she was commissioned on 29 November 1944.

Facility underwent shakedown training and proceeded to San Pedro, Los Angeles, and thence to Pearl Harbor, arriving on 17 February. After escorting the minelayer USS Weehawken (CM-12) to Eniwetok early in March, Facility began sweeping under the command of Task Group TG 52.5 preliminary to the assault landings on Okinawa on 1 April. She continued to support the operation until damaged by a near miss during a heavy suicide attack and was forced to put into Ulithi on 22 April for repairs. She resumed sweeping operations, and, after replenishing supplies in Buckner Bay, joined Task Group TG 52.4 to participate with TG 52.3 in clearing the approaches to Nagasaki, Japan.

Late in September she swept the Bungo Suido and other areas of the Inland Sea. The rest of the year was occupied in overhaul at Hiro Wan and in sweeping the Van Dieman Straits.

In the first two months of 1946 Facility journeyed from Sasebo to Saipan, Eniwetok, and Pearl Harbor before making her first return to the States. She underwent overhaul at San Pedro, Los Angeles, transited the Panama Canal on 22 March, and on to Galveston, Texas. While she remained in reserve at Galveston, she was reclassified as a Fleet Minesweeper (Steel Hull), MSF-233 on 7 February 1955. She was struck from the Naval Vessel Register on 1 May 1962 and sold to Mexico on 2 October. USS Facility received three battle stars for World War II service.

== Mexican Navy career ==
The former Facility was acquired by the Mexican Navy on 2 October 1962 and renamed ARM DM-04. Her fate is not reported in secondary sources; she may have been out of service by April 1973 when another member of the Admirable class was acquired by the Mexican Navy and also named DM-04.
