= Azteca-class patrol vessel =

Class of Mexican Navy patrol vessels

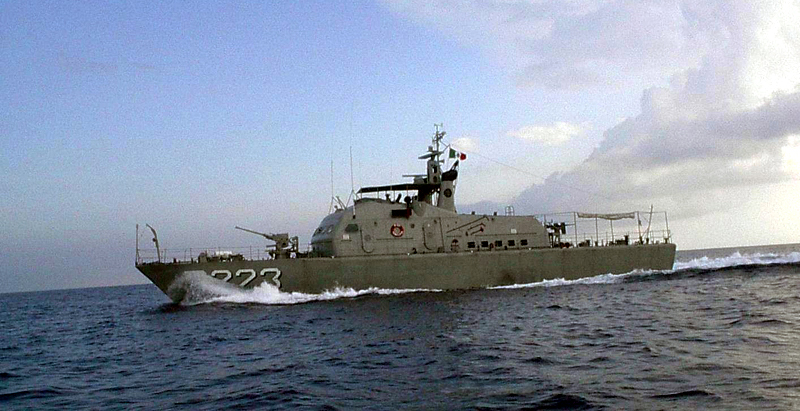
- ARM Tamaulipas (PC-223)

Class overview
- Name: Azteca class
- Builders: Ailsa Shipbuilding Co. Ltd., Scott & Sons, Bowling; Lamont & Co. Ltd. and Mexican Navy Shipyards
- Operators: Mexican Navy
- Built: 31
- In service: 20
- Active: 20
- Retired: 10

General characteristics
- Type: Coastal patrol ship
- Displacement: 148 long tons (150 t) (full load)
- Length: 111 ft 10 in (34.09 m) oa; 101 ft 4 in (30.89 m) pp
- Beam: 28 ft 3 in (8.61 m)
- Draught: 6 ft 6 in (1.98 m)
- Propulsion: 2 shafts, 2 Ruston Paxman Ventura diesels, 3,600 bhp (2,700 kW)
- Speed: 24 knots (44 km/h; 28 mph) (maximum)
- Range: 2,400 nmi (4,400 km; 2,800 mi) at 12 kn (22 km/h; 14 mph)
- Complement: 24
- Sensors & processing systems: Surface search radar Kelvin Hughes.
- Armament: 1 × 40 mm L/60 Bofors gun; 1 × 20 mm Oerlikon GAM-B01 cannon; 2 × machine guns

The Azteca-class patrol vessel are a class of patrol vessels in service with the Mexican Navy. They were designed and built by the British companies T.T. Boat Designs Ltd; Ailsa Shipbuilding Co. Ltd., Scott & Sons, Bowling; Lamont & Co. Ltd. and Vera Cruz and Salina Cruz Shipyards for the Mexican Navy from 1976 to 1980. They are multi-role patrol craft with good nautical characteristics. Original units were powered by Paxman diesels of either 3,600 hp (2,700 kW) or 4,800 hp (3,600 kW). Original units were named with pre-Hispanic tribal names.

== Design and description ==
The Azteca-class patrol vessels displace 148 long tons (150 t) at full load and are 111 feet 10 inches (34.1 m) long overall and 101 feet 4 inches (30.9 m) between perpendiculars. They have a beam of 28 feet 3 inches (8.6 m) and a draught of 6 feet 6 inches (2.0 m). The ships are propelled by two shafts driven by two Ruston Paxman Ventura diesels creating 3,600 brake horsepower (2,700 kW). This gives the vessels a maximum speed of 24 knots (44 km/h; 28 mph) and a range of 2,400 nautical miles (4,400 km; 2,800 mi) at 12 knots (22 km/h; 14 mph). The ships are armed with one Bofors 40 mm gun, one 20 mm Oerlikon GAM-B01 cannon and two machine guns. The Azteca class has a complement of 24.

== Ships ==
Azteca class
Ship name	Hull no.	Builder	In service	Status
Cordova	PC 202		1974	
Rayón	PC 206		1975	
Rejón	PC 207		1975	
De la Fuente	PC 208		1975	April 12, 2025; Sunk as wreck dive site near San Carlos, Guymas, Mexico
Guzmán	PC 209		1975	
Ramírez	PC 210		1975	
Mariscal	PC 211		1975	
Jara	PC 212		1975	
Colima	PC 214		1975	
Lizardi	PC 215		1975	
Mugica	PC 216		1976	
Velazco	PC 218		1976	
Macías	PC 220		1976	
Tamaulipas	PC 223		1977	
Yucatán	PC 224		1977	
Tabasco	PC 225		1978	
Cochimie	PC 226		1978	
Puebla	PC 228		1982	
Vicario	PC 230		1977	
Ortíz	PC 231		1977	
