= USS Park County =

1945 LST-542-class tank landing ship

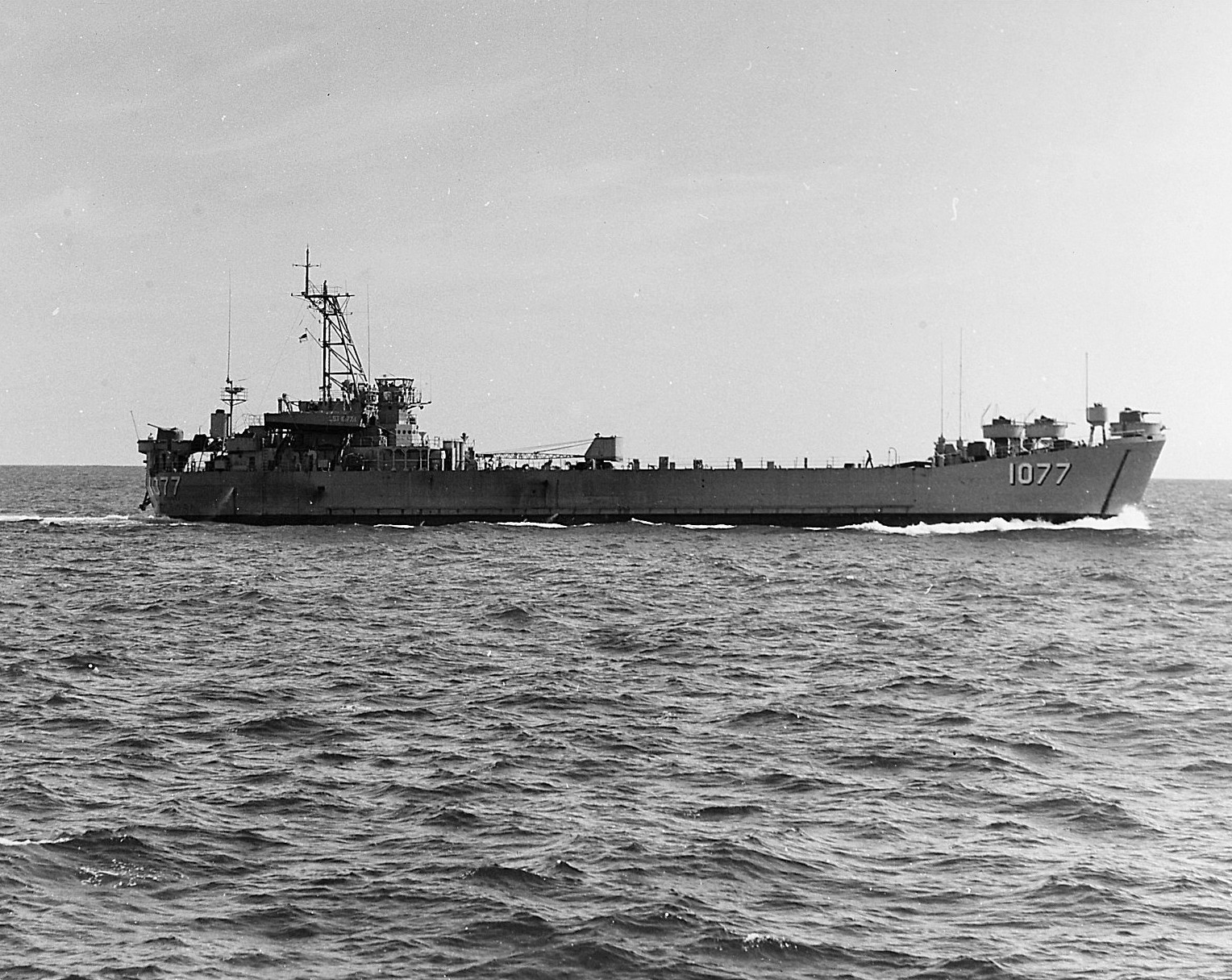
- USS Park County (LST-1077) underway

History

United States
- Name: USS LST-1077
- Builder: Bethlehem Hingham Shipyard
- Laid down: 21 March 1945
- Launched: 18 April 1945
- Commissioned: 8 May 1945
- Decommissioned: 31 July 1946
- Recommissioned: 6 September 1950
- Decommissioned: 12 May 1955
- Renamed: USS Park County (LST-1077), 1 July 1955
- Refit: November 1965
- Recommissioned: 9 April 1966
- Decommissioned: September, 1971
- Stricken: 15 April 1978
- Honors and awards: Korean War: 5 battle stars; Vietnam War: 2 Navy Unit Commendations; 1 Meritorious Unit Commendation; 11 battle stars
- Fate: Sold to Mexico, 1 July 1978

Mexico
- Name: ARM Rio Panuco (IA-1)
- Acquired: 1 July 1978
- Fate: Sunk as target, 2010

General characteristics
- Class & type: LST-542-class LST
- Displacement: 1,490 tons (light); 4,080 tons (full load of 2,100 tons)
- Length: 328 ft (100 m)
- Beam: 50 ft (15 m)
- Draft: 8 ft (2.4 m) forward; 14 ft 4 in (4.37 m) aft (full load)
- Propulsion: Two diesel engines, two shafts
- Speed: 10.8 knots (20 km/h) (max); 9 knots (17 km/h) (econ)
- Complement: 7 officers, 204 enlisted
- Armament: 8 × 40 mm guns; 12 × 20 mm guns

USS Park County (LST-1077) was an LST-542-class tank landing ship in the United States Navy. Unlike many of her class, which received only numbers and were disposed of after World War II, she survived long enough to be named. On 1 July 1955, all LSTs still in commission were named for US counties or parishes; LST-1077 was given the name Park County, after a counties in Colorado, Montana, and Wyoming.

LST-1077 was laid down on 21 March 1944 by the Bethlehem-Hingham Shipyard, Inc., Hingham, Massachusetts; launched without ceremony on 18 April 1945; and commissioned on 8 May 1945.

== World War II Service ==
After shakedown, LST–1077 was assigned to the Pacific Fleet and proceeded via the Panama Canal to Pearl Harbor, arriving 19 July. She conducted training and provided services in Hawaiian waters until 29 August, when she sailed for Japan with occupation troops embarked.

She arrived at Sasebo 22 September and departed on the 25th for Lingayen, Philippines to return personnel and equipment to Pearl Harbor. On 2 January 1946, LST–1077 was ordered to the west coast for inactivation. She arrived at San Francisco 11 January; steamed to Astoria, Oregon 3 May; and decommissioned there 31 July 1946. LST–1077 was placed in reserve and berthed with the Columbia River Group of the Pacific Reserve Fleet.

== Korean War ==
On 6 September 1950, LST–1077 recommissioned and joined the Pacific Fleet in the Far East where she served in operations in support of United Nations operations in Korea. She then returned to San Francisco in 1955 and decommissioned 12 May. She was again placed in reserve, and berthed with the San Francisco Group of the Pacific Reserve Fleet. On 1 July 1955, LST–1077 was named Park County (LST–1077) and subsequently moved to Bremerton, Washington, remaining in the Reserve Fleet there, until recalled in 1965 for Vietnam service.

== Vietnam War ==
In November 1965 Park County was towed from Bremerton to Portland, Oregon for a complete modernization overhaul. On 9 April 1966 she again commissioned and, following shakedown, was assigned to Landing Ship Squadron 3, homeported in Guam.

Park County arrived in South Vietnam in late August after carrying marines to Iwakuni, Japan. Her operations in support of the U.S. Military Assistance Command, Vietnam, included participation in Operation Duke off the coast of Tam Quan, in October 1966 and lifts to Cam Ranh Bay, Tuy Hòa and Qui Nhơn. She also spent considerable time in support of Naval Support Activity at Da Nang carrying general cargo, ammunition, troops, and lubricants.

At Vũng Tàu she relieved USS Sutter County on 4 February 1967 for Operation Market Time serving as a base of operations for Coast Guard cutters and Navy Swift Boats and providing them necessary supplies and repairs. She was relieved 4 March by USS Pitkin County, and departed Vietnamese waters for Hong Kong and Manila.

Park County returned to Da Nang 31 May and resumed operations with the Naval Support Activity. On 22 September she sailed to Guam and got underway 19 November for Yokosuka, Japan. From Yokosuka she conducted amphibious training operations until 2 December when she returned to Da Nang via Taiwan and U.S. Naval Base Subic Bay, arriving 5 January 1968.

At Da Nang she was assigned to the Da Nang-Cửa Việt Base shuttle run. On 29 February she began more Market Time operations. Park County continued her support of Vietnam operations until 13 December when she got underway for Guam for extensive overhaul. Leaving Guam 18 April 1969 she returned to Da Nang via Buckner Bay and Subic Bay, arriving 11 July.

In July 1970, Park County returned to Vietnam from Subic Bay serving as a member of the "Brown Water Navy." Lieutenant Davis was awarded the Bronze Star for his actions during a fire-fight while the Park County was on her way to resupply a base northwest of Binh Thuy.

Between July 1970 and August 1971, Park County continued to operate out of Vũng Tàu carrying and delivering food, supplies, and ammunition to U.S. Military fire bases and installation throughout the Mekong Delta. Bases she visited and supplied included both U.S. Army and U.S. Marine Corps installations at Binh Thuy, Vinh Long, Can Tho, Long Xuyen, Tan Chau, Cam Ranh and Nha Trang.

In mid-August 1971, she departed Vũng Tàu for San Diego, California, via Subic Bay, Guam, and Pearl Harbor, Hawaii, where following her arrival the U.S.S. Park County was decommissioned and ceremoniously turned over (September 1971) to the Armada de México (Mexican Navy or SEMAR) to serve as a Panuco Class Tank Landing Ship.

== Mexican Service ==
Park County was sold to the Mexican Navy 1 July 1978, and was renamed ARM Rio Panuco (IA-1). Following her services with SEMAR, she was used as a target ship and was sunk in 2010, becoming an artificial reef.

== In popular culture ==
The Park County can be seen in the opening scene of the movie Operation Petticoat as the star of the movie, Cary Grant, arrives in a black sedan driving down a wharf. The Park County is clearly identifiable on the left side of the screen.
