= USS Annapolis (PF-15) =

Tacoma-class patrol frigate

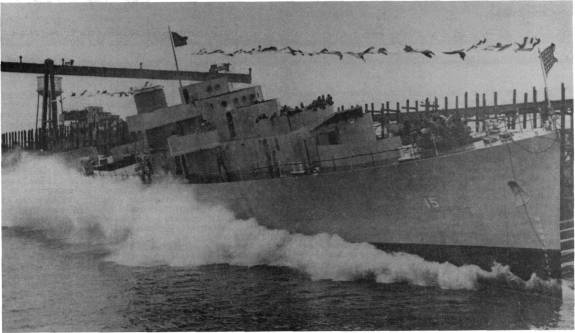
- USS Annapolis (PF-15), being launched sideways on 16 October 1943, due to constrictions of the harbor

History

United States
- Name: Annapolis
- Namesake: City of Annapolis, Maryland
- Reclassified: PF-15, 15 April 1943
- Builder: American Ship Building Company, Lorain, Ohio
- Yard number: 842
- Laid down: 20 May 1943
- Launched: 16 October 1943
- Sponsored by: Mrs. Belva Grace McCready
- Commissioned: 4 December 1944
- Decommissioned: 29 May 1946
- Stricken: 19 June 1946
- Fate: Sold to Mexican Navy, 24 November 1947

Mexico
- Name: General Vicente Guerrero
- Namesake: Vicente Guerrero
- Acquired: 24 November 1947
- Renamed: Rio Usumacinta
- Namesake: Rio Usumacinta
- Fate: Scrapped 1964

General characteristics
- Class & type: Tacoma-class frigate
- Displacement: 1,430 long tons (1,453 t) light; 2,415 long tons (2,454 t) full
- Length: 303 ft 11 in (92.63 m)
- Beam: 37 ft 11 in (11.56 m)
- Draft: 13 ft 8 in (4.17 m)
- Propulsion: 2 × 5,500 shp (4,101 kW) turbines; 3 boilers; 2 shafts
- Speed: 20 knots (37 km/h; 23 mph)
- Complement: 190
- Armament: 3 × 3"/50 dual purpose guns (3x1); 4 x 40 mm guns (2×2); 9 × 20 mm guns (9×1); 1 × Hedgehog anti-submarine mortar; 8 × Y-gun depth charge projectors; 2 × Depth charge tracks

USS Annapolis (PF-15) was a United States Navy Tacoma-class frigate in commission from 1944 to 1946. She was the second ship of the U.S. Navy to be named for Annapolis, Maryland. She later served in the Mexican Navy as ARM General Vicente Guerrero.

== Construction and commissioning ==
Annapolis was laid down on 20 May 1943, at Lorain, Ohio, by the American Ship Building Company. She was launched on 16 October 1943, sponsored by Mrs. Belva Grace McCready, and was commissioned on 4 December 1944, at Galveston, Texas.

== Service history ==
=== U.S. Navy, 1944–1946 ===
On 13 December 1944, Annapolis departed Galveston to conduct shakedown training in waters surrounding Bermuda, from 19 December 1944 to 17 January 1945. She arrived in Norfolk, Virginia, on 21 January 1945 and commenced post-shakedown repairs. She concluded repairs on 17 February 1945, and that same day stood out of Norfolk to screen a convoy to the Mediterranean Sea. Annapolis shepherded her convoy into Oran, Algeria, on 5 March 1945 and remained there until 13 March 1945, when she got underway to escort a return convoy to the United States. She entered port at New York City on 30 March 1945. Following a period of escort duty between Norfolk and New York, she departed New York in the screen of another convoy bound for North Africa. Annapolis reached Oran again on 10 May 1945 and departed there a week later. She saw her convoy safely into Philadelphia, Pennsylvania, on 2 June 1945 and remained there for two weeks.

On 16 June 1945, Annapolis got underway for the Panama Canal Zone under the command of Lt. Cmdr. Henry Frederick Garcia. She arrived in the Canal Zone on 29 June 1945 and operated from the submarine base at Coco Solo until early August 1945. On 6 August 1945, she arrived at San Pedro, California, and began duty along the United States West Coast with the United States Pacific Fleet. Slated along with her sister ship USS Bangor (PF-16) to be the last two of 30 Tacoma-class patrol frigates transferred secretly to the Soviet Navy at Cold Bay in the Territory of Alaska as a part of Project Hula, she was underway with Bangor on a voyage to Cold Bay when an order came on 5 September 1945 to suspend all further transfers of ships to the Soviet Union. Annapolis and Bangor proceeded to Cold Bay anyway, where they took aboard American personnel requiring transportation to the continental United States, then steamed to Seattle, Washington, to disembark them. Annapolis and Bangor were the only two patrol frigates scheduled for transfer under Project Hula not to be transferred.

Annapolis resumed duty with the Pacific Fleet, which lasted into 1946. On 29 May 1946, she was decommissioned at Bremerton, Washington. Her name was struck from the Navy list on 19 June 1946.

=== Mexican Navy, 1947–1964 ===
On 24 November 1947, the United States sold Annapolis to the Mexican government through the Foreign Liquidation Commission of the United States Department of State. Renamed ARM General Vicente Guerrero and later renamed ARM Rio Usumacinta, the ship was scrapped in 1964.
