= Oaxaca-class patrol vessel =

Mexican navy patrol vessel

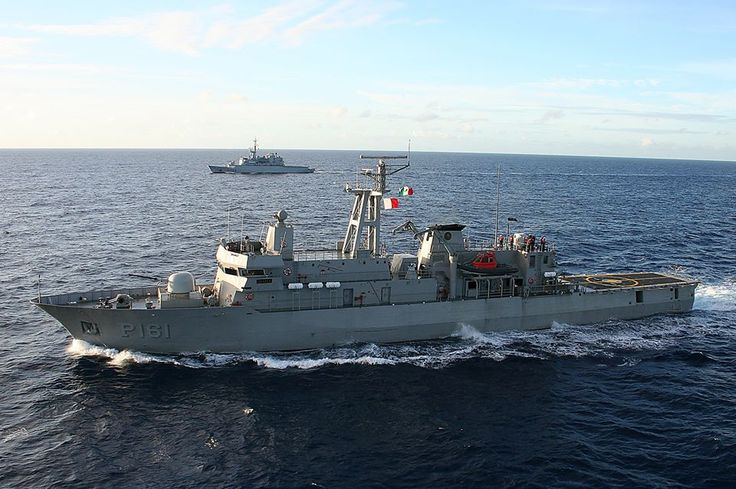
- ARM Oaxaca

Class overview
- Name: Oaxaca class
- Builders: Tampico Naval Shipyard and Salina Cruz Naval Ship Yard
- Operators: Mexican Navy
- Preceded by: Durango class
- Planned: 12
- Building: 2
- Active: 8

General characteristics
- Type: Patrol vessel
- Displacement: 1,680 short tons (1,524.1 t)
- Length: 282 ft 2 in (86.00 m)
- Beam: 34 ft 4 in (10.46 m)
- Draft: 11 ft 8 in (3.56 m)
- Propulsion: 2 × Caterpillar 3616 V16 diesel engines, 2 props
- Speed: 22 knots (41 km/h; 25 mph)
- Complement: 77 Sailors, 39 Marines or Special Forces
- Sensors & processing systems: 1 × Terma Scanter 2001 Navigation/surface search radar; Selex NA-25 radar and optronic fire control system
- Armament: 1 × Otobreda 76 mm gun or 1 x Bofors 57 mm gun; 2 × OTO Melara remote-controlled naval turret Mod. 517 with M2 12.7mm MG; 1 × OTO Melara 30 mm cannon
- Aircraft carried: 1 × Panther helicopter
- Aviation facilities: 1 helicopter hangar and Helipad

The Oaxaca class are offshore patrol vessels, constructed and designed by and for the Mexican Navy. The class is named after the Mexican state of Oaxaca. The Mexican Navy has requested seven of these ships with four already in service, three in construction, which were disclosed on June 1 on the Navy anniversary, with the name PO-163 Independencia, which is to celebrate the 200th anniversary of the Independence of Mexico. Also, another ship PO-164, named Revolucion, is in the process of raising the Mexican flag in a couple of months. Two more to be constructed in Navy's Naval Shipyards.

== Description ==
The vessels are 282 feet 2 inches (86.0 m) long and have a draft of 11 feet 8 inches (3.6 m), and a beam of 34 feet 4 inches (10.5 m). They displace 1,680 short tons (1,524.1 t).

Primary armament is a single OTO Melara 76-millimetre (3 in) naval gun or Bofors 57 mm gun. They also mount a pair of OTO Melara remote controlled naval turret Mod. 517 with M2 12.7 mm (0.50 in) machine guns, one on each side. At the rear atop the helicopter hangar is a single OTO Melara 30 mm (1.2 in) cannon. The class has a helipad on the afterdeck with handling capabilities for a variety of helicopters, such as the Panther, Fennec, or the Bolkow B-105 Super-5. The Oaxaca-class vessels have a top speed of over 22 knots (41 km/h; 25 mph) and a cruising speed of 14 knots (26 km/h; 16 mph). The ships carry a complement of 77, and have provisions to carry a group of 39 special forces and/or marines for a variety of missions.

The Oaxaca class also carries a CB-90 HMN Patrol Interceptor in its well deck.

For the 2008 fiscal year, the Mexican Congress approved $68 million in funds to build two more Oaxaca-class ships, and pledged an additional $40 million in 2009.

== Mission ==
The objectives for the Oaxaca class are oceanic surveillance, search and rescue operations, support for the civilian population in case of disasters, maritime support and to act as a deterrence against hostile ships and aircraft in low-medium intensity conflicts.

== Ships ==
Ship name	Hull no.	Launched	Commissioned
ARM Oaxaca	P-161	11 April 2003	1 May 2003
ARM Baja California	P-162	21 May 2003	1 April 2003
ARM Independencia	P-163	23 July 2009	1 June 2010
ARM Revolucion	P-164	23 November 2009	23 November 2010
ARM Chiapas	P-165	18 November 2015	23 November 2016
ARM Hidalgo	P-166	9 August 2016	23 November 2017
ARM Jalisco	P-167	2 July 2018	23 November 2018
ARM Tabasco	P-168	20 July 2019	1 June 2021
