= USS Zara =

Patrol vessel of the United States Navy

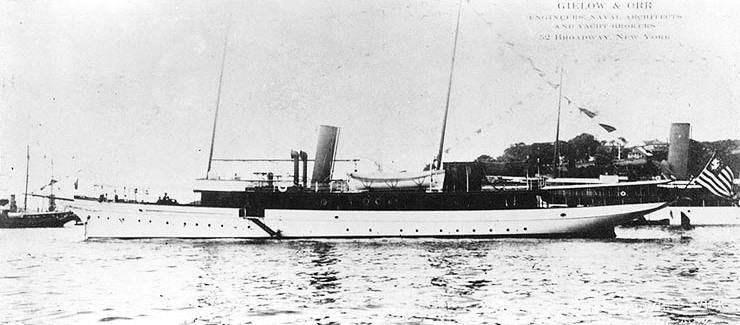
- Zara in civilian service

History
- Name: 1891: Zara; 1914: Solgar; 1917: USS Zara; 1919: Zoodohos Pigi
- Owner: 1891: Peter Coats; before 1902: Edward Tower; 1902: HB Moore; 1910: Albert L Stephens; 1913: GP Grant; 1914: William W Near; 1917: David H Friedman; 1917: US Navy; 1919: Atmoploia Stauroudi
- Port of registry: 1891: (United Kingdom) Glasgow; 1902: (United States) New York City; 1910: (United States) Detroit; 1914: (Canada) Toronto; 1917: (United States) New York City; 1919 (Greece)
- Builder: Fleming and Ferguson, Paisley
- Yard number: 173
- Launched: 3 June 1891
- Completed: 1891
- Acquired: by US Navy, 27 April 1917
- Commissioned: by US Navy, 22 May 1917
- Decommissioned: by US Navy, 13 April 1918
- Stricken: from US Navy register, 1 May 1918

General characteristics
- Type: steam yacht
- Tonnage: 195 GRT, 81 NRT
- Length: 152.0 ft (46.3 m)
- Beam: 21.1 ft (6.4 m)
- Draft: 11 ft 7 in (3.53 m)
- Installed power: 53 NHP
- Propulsion: quadruple expansion engine
- Sail plan: two-masted schooner
- Speed: 10 knots (19 km/h)
- Complement: 62
- Armament: As armed yacht: 2 × 6-pounder guns; 2 × machine guns

USS Zara (SP-133) was a steam yacht that was built in Scotland in 1890, passed through a number of British, Canadian and US owners, and ended up as a passenger steamship in Greece after the First World War. She was renamed several times, becoming Solgar, Electra and finally Zoodohos Pigi. In the latter part of the war she spent a year as an armed yacht in the United States Navy.

== Private yacht ==
Fleming and Ferguson built Zara at Paisley, Scotland, launching her on 3 June 1891. Her registered length was 152.0 ft (46.3 m), her beam was 21.1 ft (6.4 m) and her draft was 11 ft 7 in (3.53 m). Her tonnages were 195 GRT, 81 NRT and 247 Thames Measurement. Her first owner was a Peter Coats, who registered her in Glasgow.

At an unknown date one A Edward Tower had acquired Zara and registered her in New York City. By 1902 he had passed her on to an HB Moore, who kept her registered in New York City. By 1910 her owner was a GP Grant in Canada. In 1914 a William W Near acquired the yacht, renamed her Solgar, and registered her in Toronto.

== Armed yacht ==
By 1917 Solgar belonged to a David H Friedman of New York City. On 27 April 1917 the US Navy acquired her from Friedman, changed her name back to Zara, and commissioned her with the pennant number SP-133 at New York City on 22 May 1917.

Assigned to the section patrol in the 3rd Naval District, Zara cruised the waters of Long Island Sound for almost a year. She was decommissioned on 13 April 1918 and offered for sale.

Though her name was struck from the Navy Directory on 1 May 1918, the Navy retained Zara as guard vessel at Whitestone, Queens, New York, near the western entrance to Long Island Sound.

== Passenger ship ==
Zara was sold on 13 September 1919 to Atmoploia Stauroudi of Greece, who converted her into a passenger ship.
