= ARM Oaxaca =

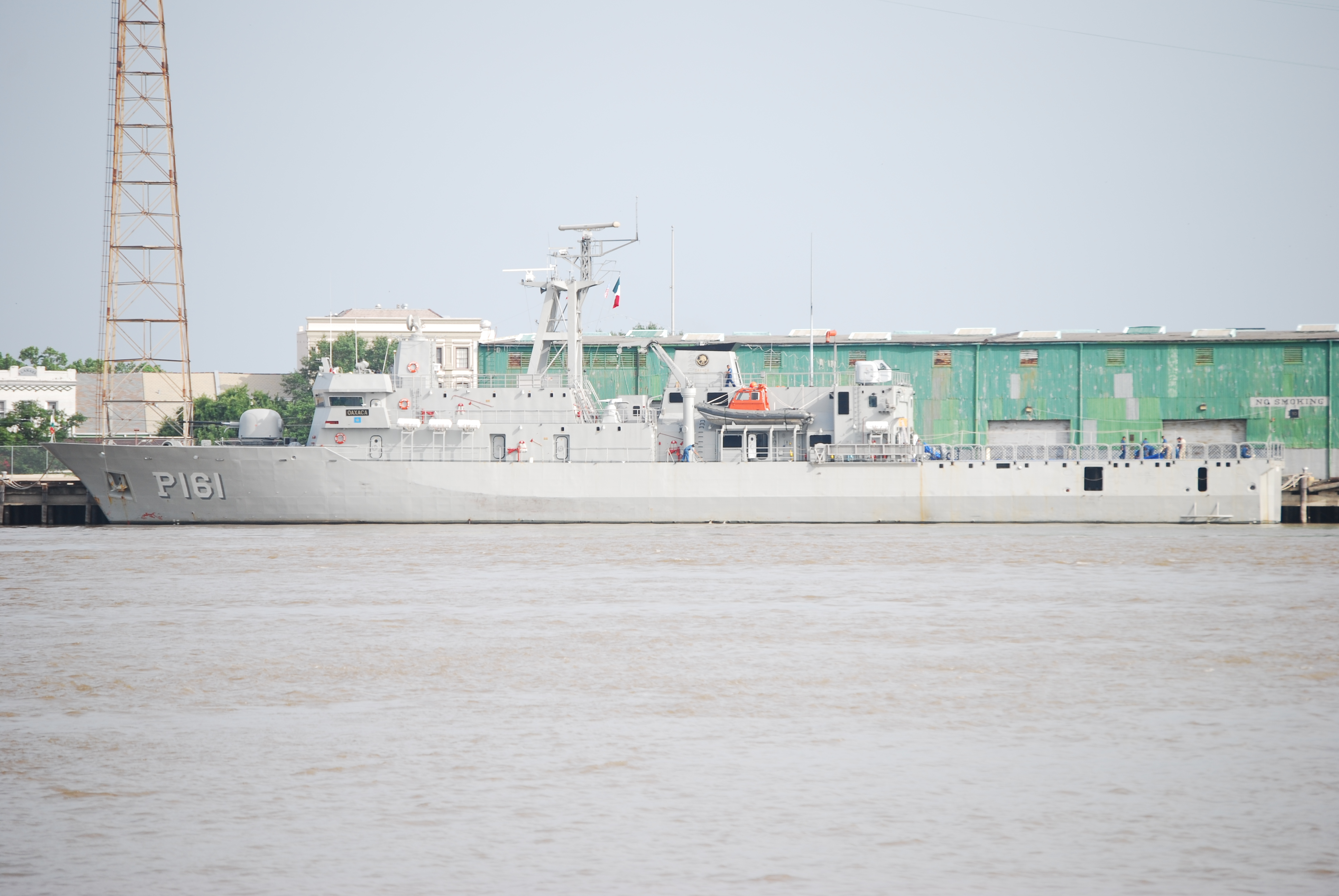
- ARM Oaxaca

History
- Name: Oaxaca
- Namesake: Oaxaca
- Commissioned: 1 May 2003
- Status: in active service

General characteristics
- Class & type: Oaxaca-class patrol vessel
- Displacement: 1,850 short tons (1,678 t)
- Length: 282 ft 2 in (86.00 m)
- Beam: 34 ft 4 in (10.46 m)
- Draft: 11 ft 8 in (3.56 m)
- Propulsion: 2 × Caterpillar 3916 V16 Diesels, 2 props
- Speed: 20 knots (37 km/h; 23 mph)
- Troops: 39 Marines or Special Forces
- Complement: 77 Sailors
- Sensors & processing systems: 2 × Terma Scanter 2001 Navigation/surface search radars; Selex NA-25 radar and optronic fire control system
- Armament: 1 × Otobreda 76 mm gun; 2 × OTO Melara 12.7 mm remote-controlled naval turret Mod. 517 with M2 12.7mm machine guns; 1 × OTO Melara single 30/SAFS 30 mm cannon
- Aircraft carried: 1 × Panther or Fennec helicopter
- Aviation facilities: 1 helicopter hangar and helipad

ARM Oaxaca (PO-161) is the lead ship of the Oaxaca class of patrol vessels, constructed by and for the Mexican Navy.

It has a length of 282.2 feet (86.0 m), a draft of 11.8 feet (3.6 m), a beam of 34.4 feet (10.5 m), and displaces 1,850 short tons (1,678.3 t).

Primary armament is a single OTO Melara 76 mm naval gun, with a pair of OTO Melara 12.7 mm remote controlled naval turret Mod. 517 with M2 12.7mm machine guns on each side, and an Oto Melara single 30/SAFS 30 mm cannon aft.

A helipad on the afterdeck has handling capabilities for a variety of helicopters, such as the Panther, Fennec, or the Bolkow Bo 105 Super-5.

The ship has a cruising speed of 20 knots (37 km/h), carries a complement of 77, and has provisions to carry a group of 39 special forces and/or marines for a variety of missions.

== UNITAS Gold ==
ARM Oaxaca participated in UNITAS Gold from 25 April 2009 to 5 May 2009. The ships main guns were tested as well as a BO-105 helicopter from the ship during the sinking of the ex-USS Conolly (DD-975) 29 April. This was the first time Mexico participated in UNITAS Gold, sending ARM Oaxaca and ARM Mina. The ships also practiced fire drills and other exercises.
