= USS Coconino County =

Tank landing ship of the US Navy

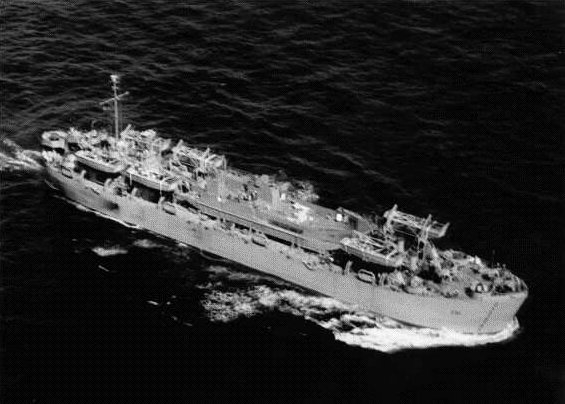
- USS LST-603

History

United States
- Name: USS LST-603
- Builder: Chicago Bridge & Iron Company, Seneca, Illinois
- Laid down: 5 November 1943
- Launched: 14 March 1944
- Commissioned: 5 April 1944
- Decommissioned: 12 May 1955
- Recommissioned: 8 June 1966
- Decommissioned: 1969
- Renamed: USS Coconino County (LST-603), 1 July 1955
- Honors and awards: 1 battle star (World War II); 6 campaign stars and 2 Meritorious Unit Commendations (Vietnam)
- Fate: Transferred to South Vietnam, 4 April 1969

South Vietnam
- Name: RVNS Vung Tau (HQ-503)
- Acquired: 4 April 1969
- Fate: Unknown

Socialist Republic of Vietnam
- Acquired: 30 April 1975
- Identification: Hull symbol: HQ-503
- Fate: Active in service as of 2003

General characteristics
- Class & type: LST-542-class tank landing ship
- Displacement: 1,780 long tons (1,809 t) light; 3,640 long tons (3,698 t) full
- Length: 328 ft (100 m)
- Beam: 50 ft (15 m)
- Draft: Unloaded : 2 ft 4 in (0.71 m) forward; 7 ft 6 in (2.29 m) aft; Loaded : 8 ft 2 in (2.49 m) forward; 14 ft 1 in (4.29 m) aft
- Propulsion: 2 × General Motors 12-567 diesel engines, two shafts, twin rudders
- Speed: 12 knots (22 km/h; 14 mph)
- Boats & landing craft carried: 2 LCVPs
- Troops: approx. 140 officers and enlisted
- Complement: 8–10 officers, 100–115 enlisted sailors
- Armament: 1 × single 3-inch/50-caliber gun mount; 8 × 40 mm guns; 12 × 20 mm guns

USS Coconino County (LST-603), originally USS LST-603, was a United States Navy LST-542-class tank landing ship built for the United States Navy during World War II and in commission from 1944 to 1955 and from 1966 to 1969. Named after Coconino County, Arizona, she was the only U.S. Navy vessel to bear the name.

LST 603 featured in a WW2 movie the LST story produced by the coast guard.

== Construction and commission ==
LST-603 was laid down on 5 November 1943 at Seneca, Illinois, by the Chicago Bridge and Iron Company. Her Ship naming and launching was on 14 March 1944, sponsored by Mrs. Etla N. Hobart, and commissioned on 5 April 1944.

== First period in commission, 1944–1955 ==
During World War II, LST-603 was assigned to the European Theater of Operations. She participated in Operation Dragoon, the invasion of southern France, in August and September 1944.

Following the war, she served in the Amphibious Force, United States Atlantic Fleet, including one deployment to the Mediterranean in 1950. She was decommissioned on 12 May 1955. On 1 July 1955, while out of commission, she was renamed USS Coconino County (LST-603).

== Second period in commission, 1966–1969 ==
Coconino County was recommissioned on 8 June 1966 for Vietnam War service, and operated in the Vietnam theater from 1966 until she was transferred to the Republic of Vietnam Navy on 4 April 1969.

== South Vietnamese service ==
In South Vietnamese service, she served as RVNS "Vung Tau" (HQ-503). South Vietnam collapsed in April 1975, where she was taken over by the Vietnam People's Navy and continues to be used as a training vessel.

== Capture by the Democratic Republic of Vietnam ==
Captured by the North Vietnamese around the time of the fall of Saigon, the ship was placed in service with the Vietnamese People's Navy

== Awards and honors ==
LST-603 received one battle star for World War II service, and Coconino County received six campaign stars and two awards of the Meritorious Unit Commendation for Vietnam War service.

== See also ==
- List of United States Navy LSTs
