= USS Roselle (AM-379) =

Minesweeper of the United States Navy

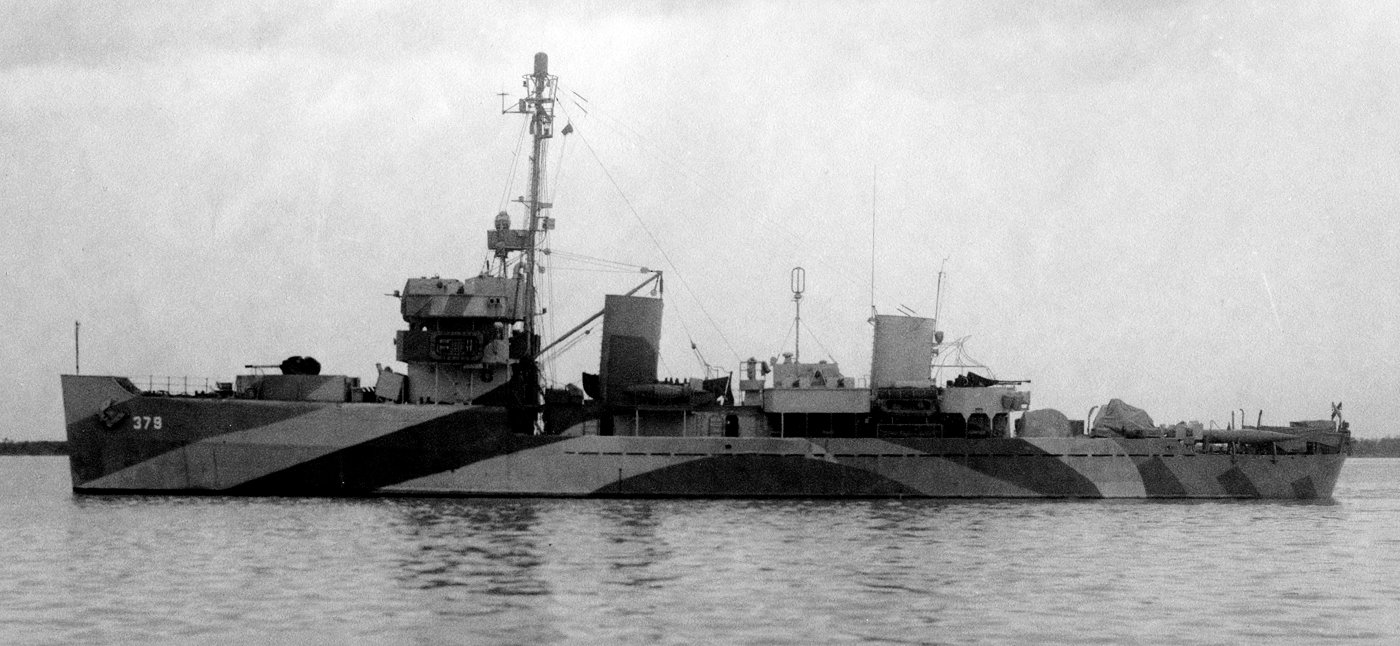
- Roselle in Mobile Bay on 16 February 1945

History

United States
- Name: USS Roselle (AM-379)
- Builder: Gulf Shipbuilding Corp., Chickasaw, Alabama
- Laid down: 24 February 1944
- Launched: 29 August 1944
- Commissioned: 6 February 1945
- Decommissioned: 20 June 1946
- Reclassified: MSF-379, 7 February 1955
- Stricken: 1 July 1972
- Fate: Sold to Mexico, 1 February 1973

Mexico
- Name: ARM Melchor Ocampo (C78)
- Namesake: Melchor Ocampo; Manuel Gutiérrez Zamora
- Acquired: 1 February 1973
- Renamed: ARM Manuel Gutiérrez Zamora (P109), 1993
- Reclassified: G10
- Status: in active service, as of 2007

General characteristics
- Class & type: Auk-class minesweeper
- Displacement: 890 long tons (904 t)
- Length: 221 ft 3 in (67.44 m)
- Beam: 32 ft (9.8 m)
- Draft: 10 ft 9 in (3.28 m)
- Speed: 18 knots (33 km/h; 21 mph)
- Complement: 100 officers and enlisted
- Armament: 1 × 3"/50 caliber gun; 2 × 40 mm guns; 2 × 20 mm guns; 2 × Depth charge tracks

USS Roselle (AM-379) was an Auk-class minesweeper acquired by the United States Navy for the dangerous task of removing mines from minefields laid in the water to prevent ships from passing. She was the second United States Navy warship to be so named.

Roselle was laid down 24 February 1944, by the Gulf Shipbuilding Corp., Chickasaw, Alabama; launched 29 August 1944; sponsored by Mrs. Louis E. Griffith; and commissioned 6 February 1945.

== Pacific Ocean operations ==
Following shakedown at Little Creek, Virginia, she replaced Pilot (AM-104) as training vessel there on 24 April 1945. Completing six months of minesweeper training operations in the Atlantic Ocean, she transited the Panama Canal and joined the U.S. Pacific Fleet on 23 October 1945. After three-week periods at San Pedro, California, and at Pearl Harbor, she proceeded to Japan, via Eniwetok and Saipan, arriving at Sasebo on 14 January 1946. She operated in Japanese waters on minesweeping operations through April, then returned to the United States via Eniwetok and Pearl Harbor, arriving San Diego 20 May to report to the 19th Fleet for inactivation.

== Decommissioning ==
Roselle was placed out of commission in reserve in San Diego on 20 June 1946. Reclassified MSF-379 on 7 February 1955, she remained out of commission in reserve at San Diego until February 1973 when she was sold to the government of Mexico. Initially named ARM Melchor Ocampo (G10), she was later renamed ARM Manuel Gutiérrez Zamora (P109). As of 2007, Manuel Gutiérrez Zamora was in active service with the Mexican Navy.
