= USS Specter =

Minesweeper of the United States Navy

History

United States
- Name: USS Spector (AM-306)
- Builder: Associated Shipbuilders, Seattle
- Laid down: 5 September 1943
- Launched: 15 February 1944
- Sponsored by: Miss Carol D. Petrie
- Renamed: USS Specter (AM-306), 8 March 1944
- Commissioned: 30 August 1944
- Decommissioned: 1946
- Reclassified: MSF-306, 7 February 1955
- Stricken: 1 July 1972
- Fate: Transferred to Mexican Navy, 11 April 1973

History

Mexico
- Name: ARM DM-04
- Acquired: 11 April 1973
- Renamed: ARM General Manuel E. Rincón (C52), 1994
- Namesake: Manuel E. Rincón
- Stricken: 16 July 2001
- Fate: unknown

General characteristics
- Class & type: Admirable-class minesweeper
- Displacement: 650 long tons (660 t)
- Length: 184 ft 6 in (56.24 m)
- Beam: 33 ft (10 m)
- Draft: 9 ft 9 in (2.97 m)
- Propulsion: 2 × Cooper Bessemer GSB-8 diesel engines, 1,710 shp (1,280 kW); National Supply Co. single reduction gear; 2 shafts
- Speed: 15 knots (28 km/h)
- Complement: 104
- Armament: 1 × 3"/50 caliber (76 mm) DP gun; 2 × twin Bofors 40 mm guns; 1 × Hedgehog anti-submarine mortar; 2 × Depth charge tracks

Service record
- Part of: U.S. Pacific Fleet (1944–1946); Atlantic Reserve Fleet (1946–1972); Mexican Navy (1973–2001)
- Operations: Battle of Iwo Jima; Battle of Okinawa
- Awards: 4 Battle stars

USS Specter (AM-306) was an Admirable-class minesweeper built for the United States Navy during World War II. She was originally ordered, laid down, and launched as USS Spector (AM-306), but was renamed the correctly spelled Specter in March 1944. She was awarded four battle stars for service in the Pacific during World War II. She was decommissioned in 1946 and placed in reserve. While she remained in reserve, Specter was reclassified as MSF-306 in February 1955 but never reactivated. In April 1973, she was sold to the Mexican Navy and renamed ARM DM-04. In 1994 she was renamed ARM General Manuel E. Rincón (C52). She was stricken in July 2001, but her ultimate fate is not reported in secondary sources.

== U.S. Navy career ==
Initially named Spector, the ship was laid down on 5 September 1943 by Associated Shipbuilders, Seattle, Washington; launched on 15 February 1944, sponsored by Miss Carol D. Petrie, and commissioned on 30 August 1944. Specter departed Seattle on 16 September en route to San Pedro, California. She conducted shakedown training off San Pedro and San Diego, California, from 21 September to 19 October. The minesweeper sailed from San Pedro on 9 November for Hawaii and arrived at Pearl Harbor on 18 November 1944. Following training in gunnery, antisubmarine warfare, and minesweeping operations, she sailed on 22 January 1945 for the Volcano Islands.

After stops at Eniwetok and Tinian, Specter arrived at Iwo Jima on 16 February, three days before the landing, and began minesweeping operations. She was busy clearing minefields, patrolling, and performing escort duty until 28 February when she sailed for Saipan. After a stop at Ulithi from 6 to 19 March Specter steamed to Okinawa. On arrival there on 25 March, she commenced pre-invasion minesweeping operations of sea-lanes and channels. The ship remained in the Okinawa area until 6 August. During this period, she conducted antisubmarine patrols, swept mines off Okinawa and Iheya Shima, and made two open-sea sweeps in the East China Sea. While on patrol off Ie Shima on 25 May, she shot down a Japanese fighter plane.

Specter was in Leyte Gulf from 9 to 27 August. She sailed for Japan on 28 August and, after touching at Buckner Bay, Okinawa, arrived in Japanese home waters on 9 September. During the next three months she swept mines at Nagasaki, Sasebo, Bungo Suido, and Tsushima. On 11 December 1945, Specter was ordered home; she arrived at San Diego on 11 January 1946; and was routed onward to Orange, Texas, where she was placed in reserve, out of commission later in the year.

Specter was re-designated MSF-306 on 7 February 1955 while in reserve. She was struck from the Naval Vessel Register on 1 July 1972 and sold to Mexico on 11 April 1973. In her U.S. Navy career, Specter was awarded four battle stars for her World War II service.

== Mexican Navy career ==
The former Specter was acquired by the Mexican Navy in April 1973 and renamed ARM DM-04. In 1994, she was renamed ARM General Manuel E. Rincón (C52), after Mexican general Manuel E. Rincón. She was stricken on 16 July 2001, but her ultimate fate is not reported in secondary sources.
