= USS Scoter (AM-381) =

Minesweeper of the United States Navy

History

United States
- Name: USS Scoter (AM-381)
- Builder: Gulf Shipbuilding Corp., Chickasaw, Alabama
- Laid down: 4 April 1944
- Launched: 26 September 1944
- Commissioned: 17 March 1945
- Decommissioned: 16 April 1947
- Reclassified: MSF-381, 7 February 1955
- Stricken: 1 December 1966
- Honours and awards: 1 battle star (World War II)
- Fate: Sold to Mexico, 19 September 1972

Mexico
- Name: ARM Gutiérrez Zamora (C84)
- Namesake: Manuel Gutiérrez Zamora
- Acquired: 19 September 1972
- Reclassified: G16
- Renamed: ARM Melchor Ocampo
- Namesake: Melchor Ocampo
- Renamed: ARM Felipe Xicoténcatl (P115), 1993
- Namesake: Felipe Xicoténcatl
- Decommissioned: retired from service by 2004
- Fate: unknown

General characteristics
- Class & type: Auk-class minesweeper
- Displacement: 890 long tons (904 t)
- Length: 221 ft 3 in (67.44 m)
- Beam: 32 ft (9.8 m)
- Draft: 10 ft 9 in (3.28 m)
- Speed: 18 knots (33 km/h; 21 mph)
- Complement: 100 officers and enlisted
- Armament: 1 × 3"/50 caliber gun; 2 × 40 mm guns; 2 × 20 mm guns; 2 × Depth charge tracks

The second USS Scoter (AM-381) was an Auk-class minesweeper acquired by the United States Navy for the dangerous task of removing mines from minefields laid in the water to prevent ships from passing. Scoter was named after the word "Scoter," which is a mercantile name retained during service in the United States Navy.

== Construction and US career ==
Scoter was the second United States Navy vessel to have that name, and was laid down on 4 April 1944 by the Gulf Shipbuilding Corp., Chickasaw, Alabama; launched on 26 September 1944; sponsored by Mrs. Reuben E. Clarson; and commissioned on 17 March 1945.

After shakedown, Scoter sailed from the U.S. East Coast on 22 May for the Pacific; arrived at San Diego, California on 13 June; and proceeded to Terminal Island, California for four additional weeks of training, which began upon arrival on 18 June. The ship underwent repairs in San Pedro, California, from 11 July to 12 August and sailed for Okinawa on 17 August, two days after the Japanese surrender.

After a month in Buckner Bay, Okinawa, Scoter sailed on 20 October for Sasebo, Japan, arriving two days later. In company with 14 minesweepers and other craft, Scoter departed Sasebo for a sweeping operation in the East China Sea on 26 October. However, after one day's sweeping, she was withdrawn from the task group and returned to Sasebo to prepare for minesweeping support missions elsewhere in Japan. On 3 November, she proceeded to Iki Shima with Barbican (ACM-5), but was unable to enter the harbor there and returned to Sasebo on 9 November. She sailed two days later for Fukuoka, Japan, where she served as logistics ship for sweeping operations. On 28 January 1946, she sailed for Kure, Japan, to serve as logistics vessel for Minesweeping Craft Three. The minesweeper departed Kure on 24 February and arrived at San Francisco, California, on 18 April 1946 for overhaul.

Scoter departed San Diego on 16 November 1946 with five YMSs, and, for the next five months, supported these vessels as they cleared minefields at Johnston Island, Eniwetok, Guam, and Woleai. She then joined five larger minesweepers in sweeps at Truk before returning, via Pearl Harbor, to Seal Beach, California, on 14 April.

Scoter arrived at San Diego for inactivation the next day, and was decommissioned and placed in reserve there on 16 April 1947. Scoter was reclassified MSF-381 on 7 February 1955. Scoter was sold to Mexico on 19 September 1972.

=== Awards ===
Scoter received one battle star for her World War II participation.

== Mexican Navy service ==
On 19 September 1972, the former Scoter was sold to the Mexican Navy and renamed ARM Gutiérrez Zamora (C84). At dates unspecified in secondary sources, her pennant number was changed to G16, and her name was changed to Melchor Ocampo. In 1993, both her name and pennant number were changed again, this time to Felipe Xicoténcatl (P115), which would remain her name through the end of her Mexican Navy service. Felipe Xicoténcatl had been retired from active service by 2004.
