= KRI Bung Hatta =

Corvette of Indonesian Navy

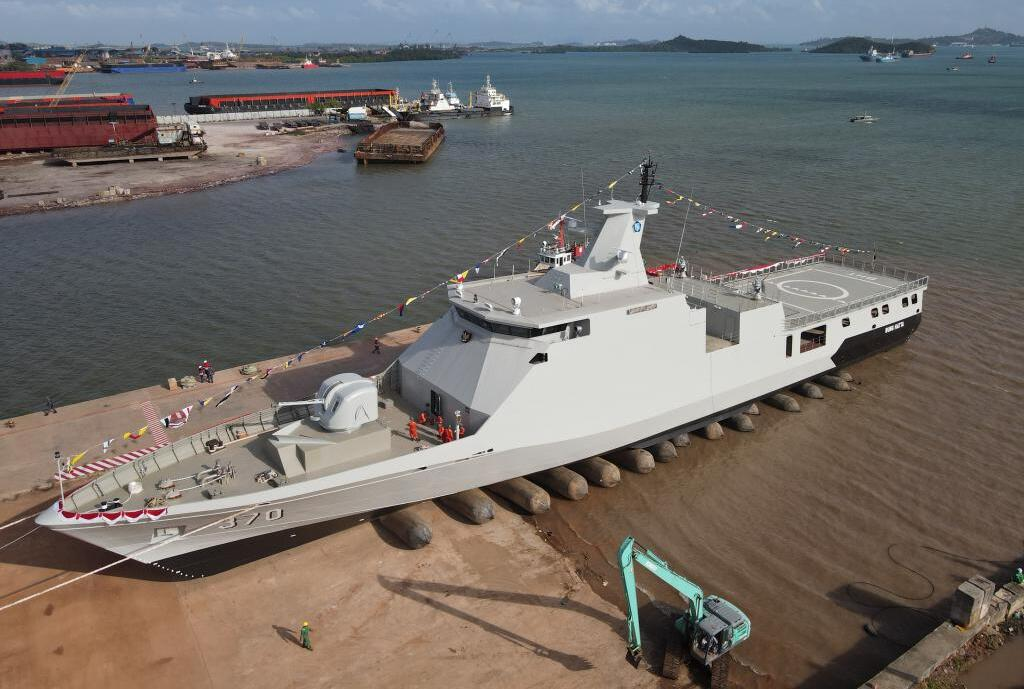
- KRI Bung Hatta in the slipway

History

Indonesia
- Name: KRI Bung Hatta
- Namesake: Mohammad Hatta
- Ordered: 25 January 2024
- Builder: PT Karimun Anugrah Sejati, Batam
- Laid down: 25 January 2024
- Launched: 27 February 2025
- Commissioned: 17 April 2025
- Home port: Surabaya
- Identification: MMSI number: 525114136; Callsign: YDTN3; Pennant number: 370
- Status: Active

General characteristics
- Type: Bung Karno-class corvette
- Length: 80.3 m (263 ft 5 in)
- Beam: 12.6 m (41 ft 4 in)
- Speed: 25 knots (46 km/h)
- Endurance: 5 days
- Complement: 82
- Armament: Planned; 1 × OTO Melara 76 mm; 2 × 20 mm Yugoimport M71/08; SAM, AShM, torpedoes; As built; 1 × 57 mm Bofors 57/70 Mk 1; 2 × 20 mm Yugoimport M71/08
- Aircraft carried: 1 × helicopter (AS565 Panther)
- Aviation facilities: Flight deck

KRI Bung Hatta (370) is the second Bung Karno-class corvette of the Indonesian Navy. The ship was named after the First Vice President of Indonesia Mohammad Hatta.

== Design and description ==
Bung Hatta was planned to be the improved variant of KRI Bung Karno with slightly larger size and better weaponries. The ship itself has a length of 80.3 m (263 ft) and beam of 12.6 m (41 ft). The corvette has a top speed of 25 knots (46 km/h), cruising speed of 18 knots (33 km/h), economical speed of 14 knots (26 km/h), and up to 5 days endurance at sea. Bung Hatta has a complement of 82 personnel.

The ship was planned to be armed with one Leonardo's OTO Melara 76 mm Super Rapid naval gun, two 20 mm autocannons, torpedoes, two twin anti-ship missile launchers, and surface-to-air missiles. As built, the ship was armed with one Bofors 57 mm L/70 Mk 1 gun at the bow and two 20 mm Yugoimport M71/08 guns at each sides of the rear superstructure. The 57 mm Bofors gun served as the interim main gun of the corvette until the OTO Melara 76 mm Super Rapid gun could be sourced and installed.

The corvette was planned to be equipped with electronical warfare suites, such as radar electronic countermeasures (R-ECM) and radar electronic support measures (R-ESM).

Bung Hatta is also able to carry a Eurocopter AS565 Panther helicopter and has a flight deck. The ship carried two rigid-hulled inflatable boats (RHIB) and has a stern ramp for boats, which could support infiltration, exfiltration, search and rescue (SAR), and visit, board, search, and seizure (VBSS) missions.

== Construction and career ==
During the commissioning ceremony of KRI Bung Karno on 1 June 2023, the Chief of Staff of the Navy Admiral Muhammad Ali announced that an improved sister ship of Bung Karno would be built. Admiral Ali also stated that the ship might be named after Mohammad Hatta, one of Indonesia's founding fathers and the first Indonesian vice president. Contract for the corvette was signed on 25 January 2024 at PT Karimun Anugrah Sejati shipyard in Batam. On the same day, the first steel cutting and keel laying ceremony was also held.

The corvette was launched on 27 February 2025 and was officially named as KRI Bung Hatta, sponsored by the spouse of Chief of Navy Mrs Fera Muhammad Ali. The ship is planned to be assigned to the 2nd Fleet Command in Surabaya. Bung Hatta was delivered to the Indonesian Navy and commissioned on 17 April 2025.
