= Jerung =

Jerung may be:

- Jerung language
- Jerung-class gunboat
