= Bung Karno-class corvette =

Ship class

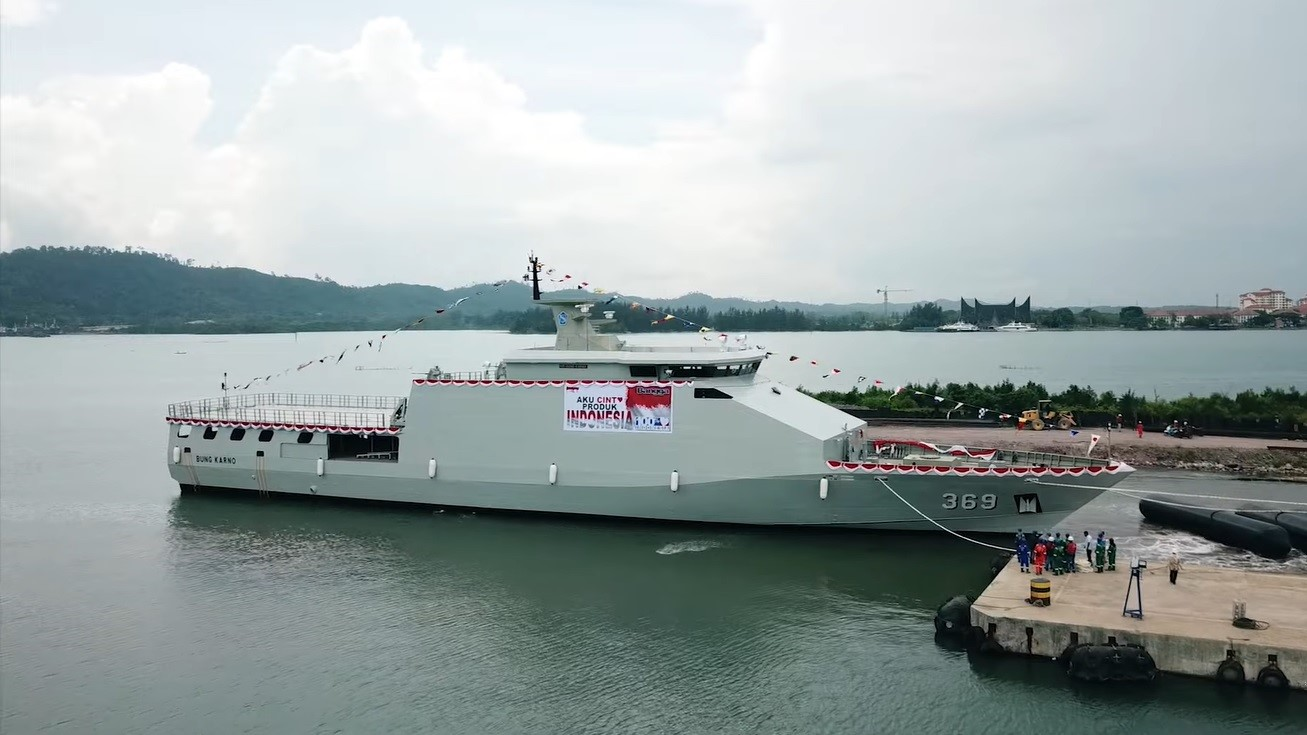
- Class leader KRI Bung Karno during its launching ceremony in October 2022

Class overview
- Name: Bung Karno class
- Builders: PT Karimun Anugrah Sejati, Batam
- Operators: Indonesian Navy
- Preceded by: Bung Tomo class
- Built: 2022–2025
- In commission: 2023–present
- Planned: 2
- Active: 2

General characteristics (KRI Bung Karno)
- Class & type: Corvette
- Displacement: 650 tonnes (640 long tons)
- Length: 73 m (239 ft 6 in)
- Beam: 12 m (39 ft 4 in)
- Draft: 2.3 m (7 ft 7 in)
- Propulsion: 2 × diesel engines, 4,000 kW (5,400 shp); 3 × diesel generators
- Speed: 25 knots (46 km/h)
- Endurance: 5 days
- Complement: 55
- Armament: 1 × 40 mm Leonardo OTO Marlin 40; 2 × 20 mm Yugoimport M71/08 guns; FFBNW; 2 × twin SIMBAD SAM (4 missiles); AShM, torpedoes
- Aircraft carried: 1 × helicopter (AS565 Panther)
- Aviation facilities: Flight deck

The Bung Karno class is a class of two near-identical corvettes in service with the Indonesian Navy. The class were built by PT Karimun Anugrah Sejati shipyard in Batam, Riau Islands.

The lead ship, KRI Bung Karno, was designed to fulfill the role of a presidential and combatant ship, while the second ship, KRI Bung Hatta, was designed as a pure corvette. They were named after the First President and Vice President of Indonesia.

== History ==
Bung Karno was designed to meet the needs of a new presidential ship that were also capable to be utilized as a warship in wartime. The previous presidential ship, KRI Barakuda (633), is a patrol boat built by Lürssen and was launched in 1995. After 27 years of service as presidential ship, the Navy saw it needed to be replaced. The 300 billion rupiah contract for the new presidential ship/corvette was awarded to PT Karimun Anugrah Sejati shipyard in Batam, Riau Islands on 25 May 2022. The steel cutting and keel laying for the presidential ship were done on 9 June 2022. On 20 June, the ship was officially named as Bung Karno. The ship was launched on 19 April 2023 and commissioned on 1 June 2023.

During the commissioning ceremony of Bung Karno, the Chief of Staff of the Navy Admiral Muhammad Ali stated that a sister ship to Bung Karno was planned to be built. The unnamed second ship would have better weaponries than Bung Karno. The contract for the second ship was signed on 25 January 2024 at PT Karimun Anugrah Sejati shipyard. On the same day, the steel cutting and keel laying ceremony was held. The second ship, named KRI Bung Hatta, was launched on 27 February 2025 and commissioned on 17 April 2025.

== Ships in the class ==
Name	Hull no.	Builder	Laid down	Launched	Commissioned	Status
Bung Karno	369	PT Karimun Anugrah Sejati	9 June 2022	19 April 2023	1 June 2023	Active
Bung Hatta	370	PT Karimun Anugrah Sejati	25 January 2024	27 February 2025	17 April 2025	Active

== See also ==
- List of active Indonesian Navy ships
