= Mandau-class fast attack craft =

Missile boats of the Indonesian Navy

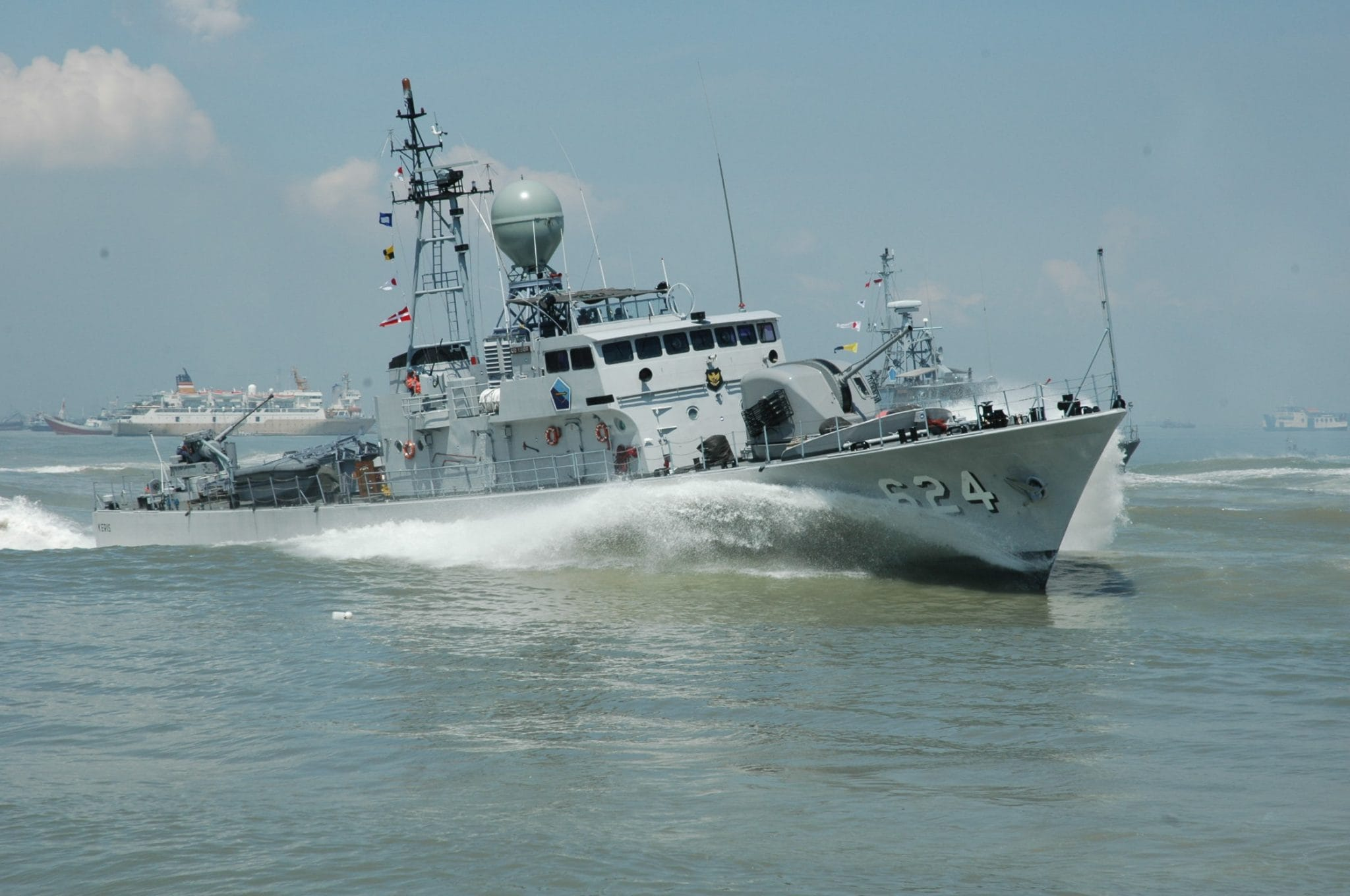
- KRI Keris

Class overview
- Builders: Korea Tacoma Marine Industries Ltd
- Operators: Indonesian Navy
- Preceded by: Kelap Lintah class
- Succeeded by: Clurit class; Klewang class
- In service: 1979-present
- Completed: 4
- Active: 3
- Lost: 1

General characteristics
- Class & type: Missile boat
- Displacement: 250 tons (standard); 290 tons (Full)
- Length: 53.7 m (176 ft 2 in)
- Beam: 8 m (26 ft 3 in)
- Propulsion: CODOG : 1 x General Electric-Fiat LM-2500 gas turbine; 2 x MTU 12V331TC81 diesels
- Speed: 41 knots (76 km/h; 47 mph)
- Range: 2,600 nmi (4,815 km; 2,992 mi) at 14 knots (26 km/h; 16 mph)
- Complement: 43
- Sensors & processing systems: Racal Decca AC1226 radar; Signaal WM28 firing control radar; Selenia NA-18 e/o director; ESM Thompson-CSF DR2000S ECM suite
- Armament: As built; Guns: 1 x 57/70 Bofors SAK Mk 1 1 x 40/70 Bofors 350AFD 2 x 20/85 S.20; Missiles: 4 x MM38 Exocet SSM (the missiles might be removed due to obsolescence)

The Mandau-class, Indonesian designation KCR-PSK, is a class of four missile-armed fast attack craft that are currently operated by the Indonesian Navy. They were built by the Korea Tacoma Marine Industries from South Korea between 1977 and 1980.

== Design ==
In 1975, Indonesia placed an order with the South Korean shipbuilder, Korea Tacoma International, for 4 PSK Mark 5 missile armed fast attack craft. The design was based on Korea Tacoma's PSSM patrol boat built for the Republic of Korea Navy, which in turn was based on the Asheville-class gunboat built for the US Navy.

The ships are 53.58 m (175 ft 9 in) long, with a beam of 8.00 m (26 ft 3 in) and a draught of 1.63 m (5 ft 4 in). Displacement is 250 long tons (250 t) standard and 290 long tons (290 t) full load. The ships's machinery is arranged in a 2-shaft, Combined Diesel or Gas (CODOG) layout, with a single General Electric-Fiat LM2500 gas turbine rated at 25,000 shp (19,000 kW) powering the ship at high speeds, with two MTU 12V331 TC81 diesel engines rated at 1,120 bhp (840 kW) each, power the ship at lower speeds. Maximum speed is 41 kn (47 mph; 76 km/h) using the gas turbine, and 17 kn (20 mph; 31 km/h) using the diesels. Range is 2,500 nmi (2,900 mi; 4,600 km) at 17 kn (20 mph; 31 km/h).

The ships are fitted with a single Bofors 57 mm SAK-57 Mk I gun forward, with a Bofors 40 mm L/70 gun aft, with two Rheinmetall 20 mm cannon providing close-in defence. Four MM38 Exocet anti-ship missiles can be carried. The ships have a crew of 7 officers and 36 other ranks.

A Racal Decca 1226 I-band surface search radar is fitted, while fire control is by a Signaal WM 28 fire control radar and a Selenia NA-18 optronic director.

== Operational history ==
On September 11, 2018, KRI Rencong caught fire and sank while on patrol near Sorong in West Papua. The incident occurred at around 7 a.m. when a fire broke out in the ship's engine room after the gas turbine unexpectedly shut down. The fire soon spread to other compartments, including the ammunition room, prompting the ship's commander to issue an order to abandon ship. The patrol boat has been instrumental in Indonesia's efforts to root out illegal fishing since 2015. The ship used to intercept mainly Philippine and Taiwanese fishing boats entering and fishing illegally in Indonesian waters. It formed part of the Indonesian Navy's Third Fleet Command in Sorong and used to patrol the Banda Sea in the Maluku Islands and the Celebes Sea east of Sulawesi Island.

== Ships ==
| Name | Hull number | Builder | Commissioned | Status |
|---|---|---|---|---|
| Mandau | 621 | Korea Tacoma Marine Industries | 20 July 1979 | Active |
| Rencong | 622 | Korea Tacoma Marine Industries | 20 July 1979 | Sank following a fire incident in September 2018. |
| Badik | 623 | Korea Tacoma Marine Industries | February 1980 | Active |
| Keris | 624 | Korea Tacoma Marine Industries | February 1980 | Active |

== See also ==
List of active Indonesian Navy ships

Equipment of the Indonesian Navy

== Bibliography ==
- Baker, A.D. (1998). The Naval Institute Guide to Combat Fleets of the World 1998–1999. Annapolis, Maryland, USA: Naval Institute Press. ISBN 1-55750-111-4.
- Gardiner, Robert; Chumbley, Stephen, eds. (1995). Conway's All the World's Fighting Ships 1947–1995. Annapolis, Maryland, USA: Naval Institute Press. ISBN 1-55750-132-7.
- Saunders, Stephen, ed. (2002). Jane's Fighting Ships 2002–2003. Coulsdon, UK: Jane's Information Group. ISBN 0710624328.
