= Bofors 57 mm Naval Automatic Gun L/70 =

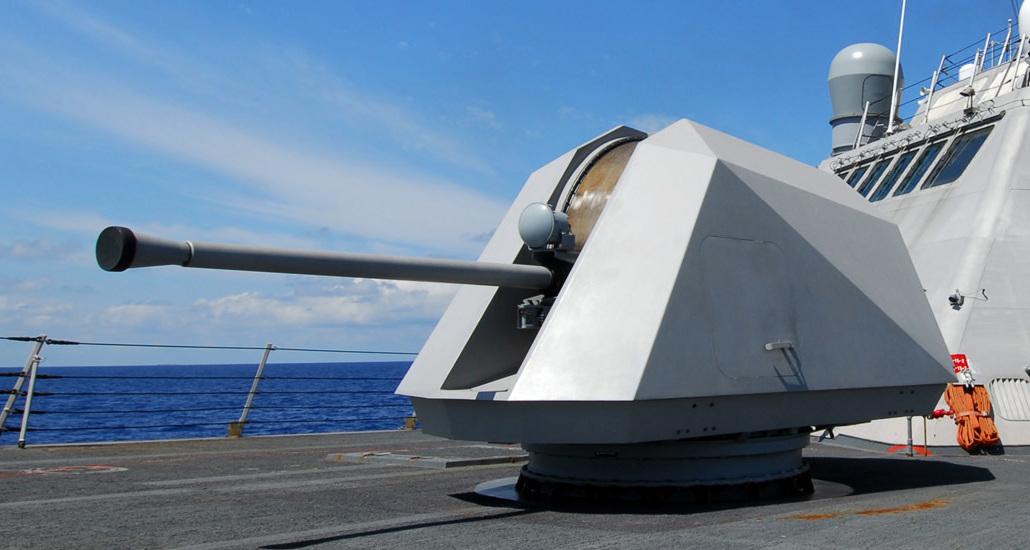
- A Mk 110 57 mm gun on the littoral combat ship USS Freedom
- Type: Naval artillery
- Place of origin: Sweden

Service history
- In service: 1971–present
- Used by: See users

Production history
- Designer: Bofors Defence
- Designed: Mark 1: 1970; Mark 2: 1981; Mark 3: 1995
- Manufacturer: Bofors Defence (1970–2000); United Defense (2000–2005); BAE Systems AB (2005 onwards)
- Produced: Mark 1: 1970; Mark 2: 1985; Mark 3: 2000
- Variants: See variants

Specifications
- Mass: Mark 3: 14,000 kg (31,000 lb) (weight including 1,000 rounds onboard, each weighing 6.5 kg (14 lb) per complete round)
- Barrel length: Bore length: 3,990 mm (157.09 in); Without flash hider: 4,045 mm (159.25 in); With flash hider: 4,345 mm (171.06 in)
- Shell: 57 × 438 mm R (m/70); 6.1 kg (13 lb) complete round 2.4 kg (5.3 lb) pre-fragmented shell
- Caliber: 57 mm/70 caliber
- Barrels: Single barrel (progressive RH parabolic twist, 24 grooves)
- Action: Electronic firing
- Elevation: Mark 1: −10°/+78° (40°/s); Mark 2: −10°/+75° (40°/s); Mark 3: −10°/+77° (44°/s)
- Traverse: Full 360°: Mark 1: 55°/s; Mark 2: 55°/s; Mark 3: 57°/s
- Rate of fire: Mark 1: 200 rounds/min; Mark 2: 220 rounds/min; Mark 3: 220 rounds/min
- Muzzle velocity: 1,035 m/s (3,400 ft/s) (HE round)
- Effective firing range: 8,500 m (9,300 yd) (HE round)
- Maximum firing range: 17,000 m (19,000 yd) (HE round at 45°)
- Feed system: Magazine: Mark 1: 40 ready rounds, 128 rounds in ready racks in mount; Mark 2: 120 ready rounds, up to 40 rounds in dual hoists; Mark 3: 120 ready rounds, up to 40 rounds in dual hoists, 1,000 rounds in mounting
- Sights: Gyro-stabilized in local control.

The Bofors 57 mm Naval Automatic Gun L/70 (Swedish: 57 mm sjöautomatkanon L/70 (57 mm SAK 70)), among other names, is a series of dual-purpose naval guns designed and produced by the Swedish arms manufacturer AB Bofors (since March 2005 part of BAE Systems AB), designed in the late 1960s as a replacement design for the twin barreled Bofors 57 mm Naval Automatic Gun L/60. The gun is remotely controlled by a fire-control computer but can as a redundancy measure also be operated manually by crew using instrument panels either on or in direct contact with the gun.

The gun has been upgraded and improved several times:

- Mk1 – The baseline Mark 1 variant began production in 1970 and was initially used to equip smaller coastal patrol craft and fast attack craft.
- Mk2 – The improved Mark 2 variant came in 1981 and drastically lowered the weight as well as introduced new servo stabilizers.
- Mk3 – The improved Mark 3 variant came in 1995 and primarily features the ability to use programmable ammunition.

While the 57 mm cannon may not seem as powerful as larger naval guns, such as the OTO Melara 76 mm, some of its performances are comparable; given its rate of fire and amount of explosive per shell, the Bofors gun actually achieves a higher amount of "explosive fired per second" than the 76 mm.

Although the Swedish Navy has been the primary user of the gun, it has been exported widely by Bofors Defence for use by the navies of Brunei, Canada, Croatia, Finland, Indonesia, Ireland, Malaysia, Mexico, Montenegro, Singapore, Thailand, and the United States.

== Names ==
The gun is formally known under a variety of names around the globe. Internally at Bofors (now BAE Systems AB) it usually goes under names incorporating the Bofors term 'SAK', an acronym for 'SjöAutomatKanon', meaning "Sea Automatic Cannon" (literal) or "Naval Automatic Gun" (formal). Some examples being: 57 mm SAK 70 (57 mm sjöautomatkanon L/70) and SAK 57 Mk1, SAK 57 Mk2, SAK 57 Mk3, etc. Not to be confused with the Bofors 57 mm Naval Automatic Gun L/60 which has gone under similar names like 57 mm SAK 60 (57 mm sjöautomatkanon L/60). BAE Systems has also stated on their website that the current generation of the weapon, the mark 3, is simply known as the 57Mk3 internally as of 2011.

== Design and development ==
The Bofors 40 mm L/60 anti air gun (1.6 inch) was one of the most popular naval anti-aircraft guns during World War II, used long after the war in a variety of roles. However, as jet aircraft became more prevalent in the post-war era, it was clear the gun did not have the rate of fire needed to effectively deal with these threats. Flying at speeds close to 1,000 kilometres per hour (620 mph), a jet aircraft flew through the effective range of the Bofors 40 mm gun in too short a time for the gun to fire enough rounds to ensure a hit.

Bofors' engineers considered two solutions to the problem. One was to greatly increase the firing speed of the 40 while also incorporating any minor changes that would improve its range. This produced the 40 mm L/70, which remains popular to this day. The other was to design a larger weapon with much greater effective range and a larger explosive load that offset a lower firing rate. This eventually resulted in the single-barreled Bofors 57 mm Automatic A.A. Gun L/60 and twin-barreled Bofors 57 mm Naval Automatic Gun L/60 in 1950. The 57 mm L/60 systems were however far from ideal; they had a low rate of fire and were very big and heavy, especially the twin-barrel system. Due to the ever-improving performance of jet aircraft, a new and improved base design was needed by the late 1960s. The focus of the new design was to increase velocity, range and firing rate. This design became the 57 mm Naval Automatic Gun L/70.

=== Mark 1 ===
The baseline version of the new gun, later known as the Mark 1, used a cartridge with the same case-length as the cartridge on the 57 mm Naval Automatic Gun L/60 (57 mm x 438 mm) but with a new shape and propellant, giving it an increased velocity of 1,025 m/s (3,360 ft/s), compared to 890 m/s (2,900 ft/s) on the L/60 cartridge. Fire rate was also higher on the L/70 design: 200 rounds per minute, compared to 130 rounds per minute per barrel on the 57 mm L/60-design. The Mark 1 gun mount featured a 40-round magazine and a further 128 rounds were stowed inside the Mark 1 turret. Aiming operation was performed by a new electro-hydraulic system for rapid training and elevation.

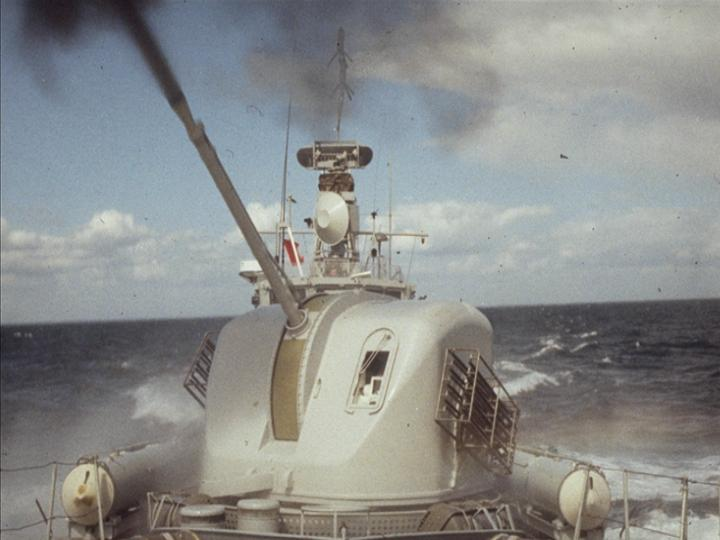
Bofors 57/70 Mark 1 firing from a Swedish Norrköping-class missile boat.

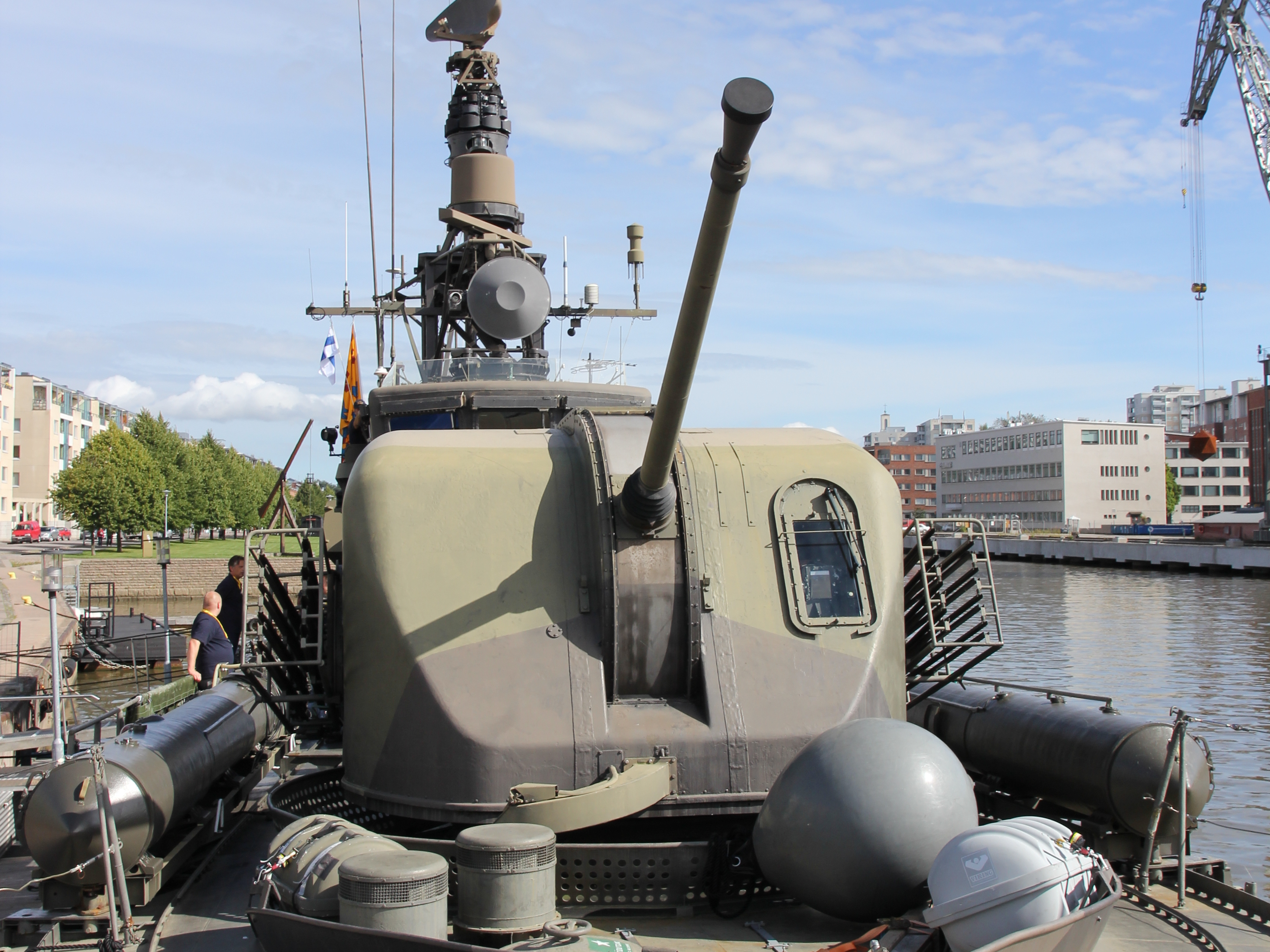
Bofors 57/70 Mark 1 on a Swedish Norrköping-class missile boat.

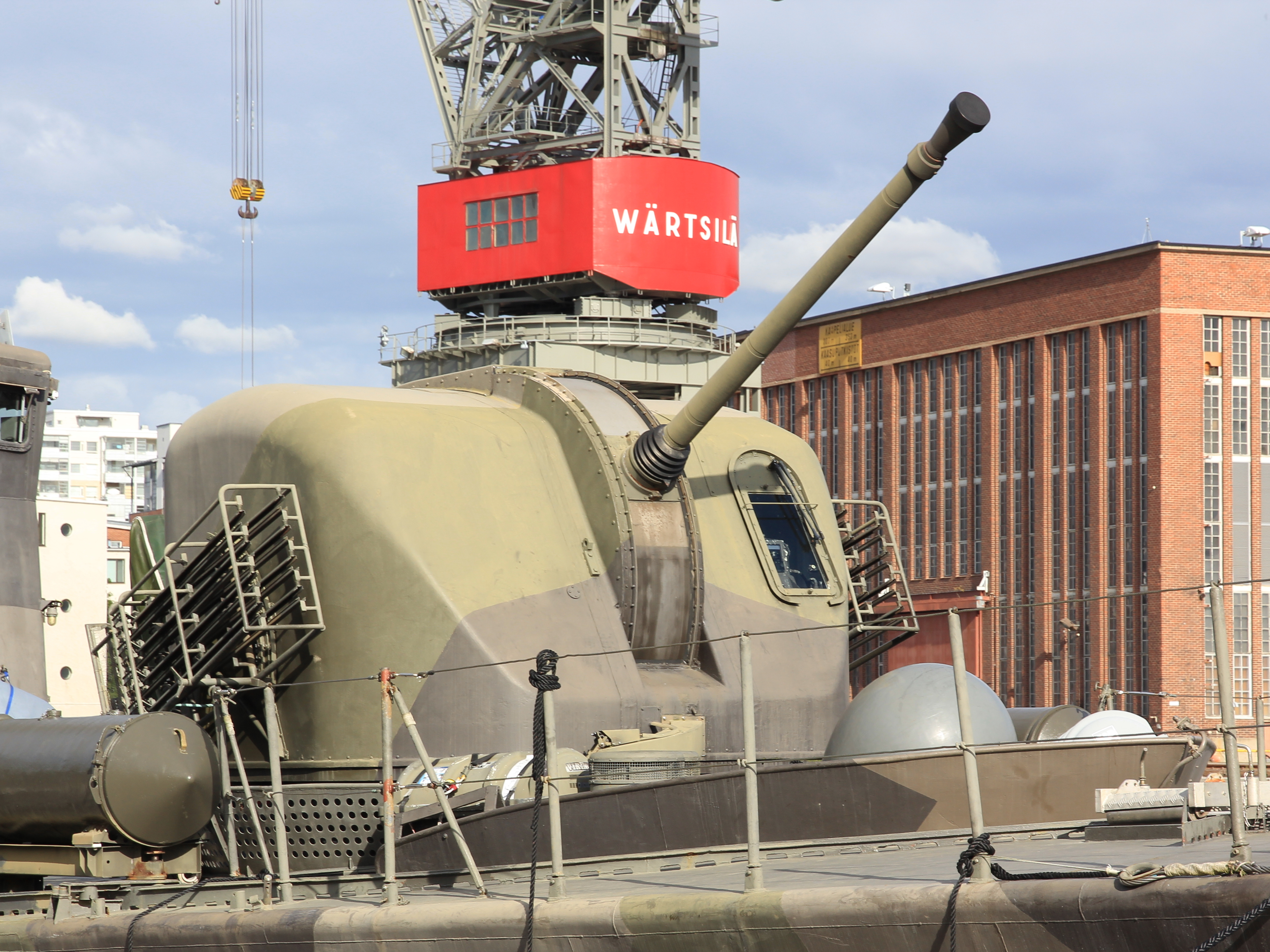
Bofors 57/70 Mark 1 on a Swedish Norrköping-class missile boat.

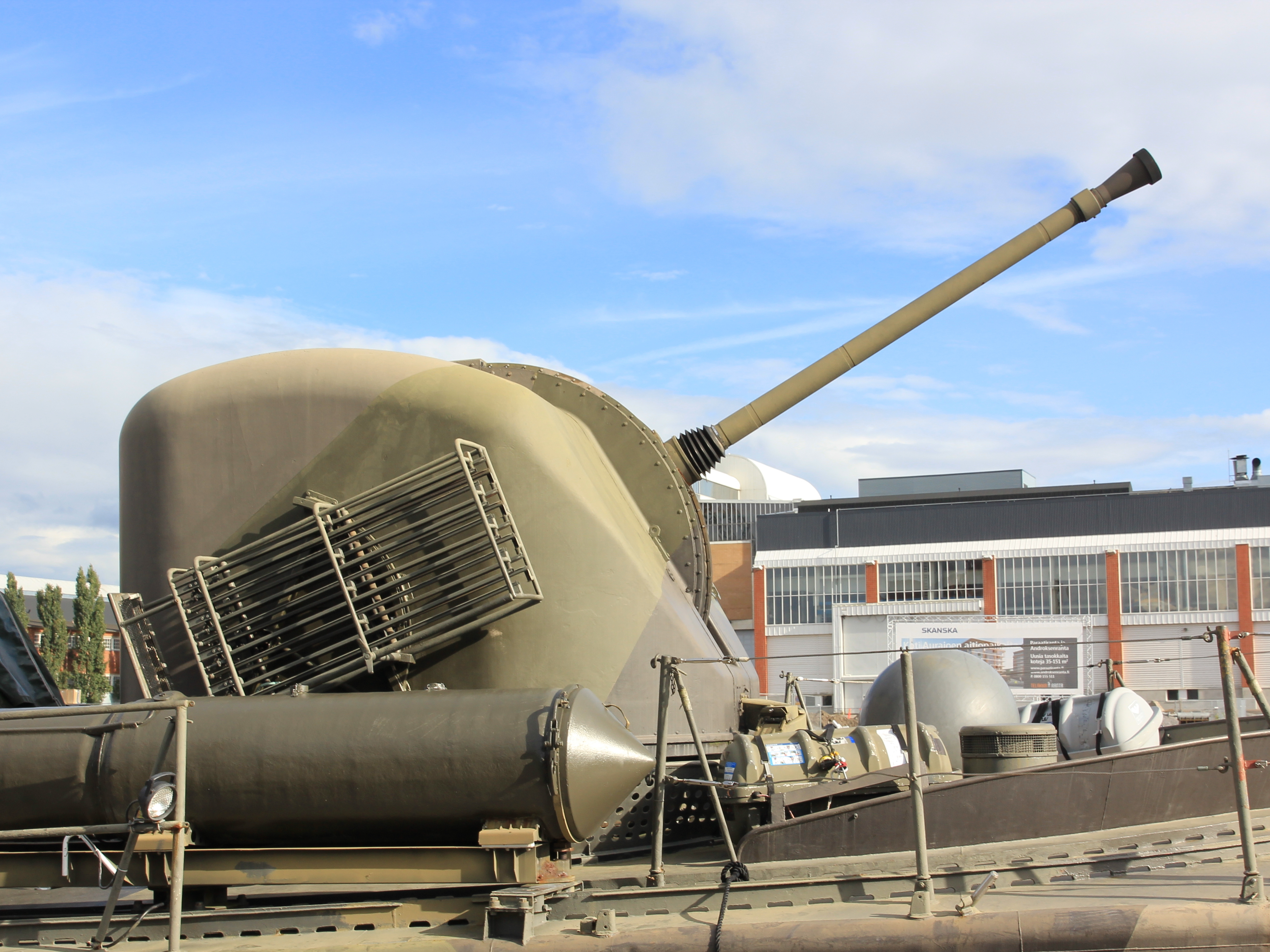
Bofors 57/70 Mark 1 on a Swedish Norrköping-class missile boat.

The 57 mm L/70 Mark 1 was introduced into the Swedish Navy in 1971 as the 57 mm automatpjäs 7101 (57 mm apj 7101) on the Norrköping-class fast attack craft, also known as the Spica-II-class (not to be confused with the Spica-class torpedo boat (Spica-I)). It featured two ammunition hoists. A second variant designated 57 mm apj 7102 was introduced in 1972 on the patrol boat HSwMS Jägaren. It was similar to the 7101 but featured only a single ammunition hoist. Besides Sweden, the Mark 1 also saw adoption with Finland, Malaysia, Norway, Indonesia, Singapore and (the former) Yugoslavia.

=== Mark 2 ===
The Mark 2 was an improved variant of the gun designed in 1981. It featured a slightly higher rate of fire of 220 rounds per minute, had a lighter weight, and utilized a new servo drive/servomechanism system which compensates for barrel oscillations during firing, increasing the hit probability. According to Bofors, the new servo system allowed the Mark 2 to be both accurate and agile enough for use against sea skimming anti-ship missiles and that it could put more explosives into a surface target within a thirty-second window than any naval gun with a calibre smaller than 100 mm (3.9 in). The Mark 2 gun is fitted with a 40-round ready-use gun-magazine with four vertical 10-round compartments. There are also cassettes inside the mounting for 80 more ready to use rounds (120 rounds total in the mounting). Ammunition is hoisted manually into the mounting using two manual-hoists which feeds from the ammunition-room below the mounting. Bofors claims that with 120 ready rounds the system can sufficiently engage 1 to 2 surface targets and 4 sea skimming missiles.

To remove weight from the design, the Mark 2 variant omitted the water-cooling used on the Mark 1. This meant a lighter barrel and gun mount. According to Bofors, water-cooling was not needed for the modern missions the Mark 2 was used for. Bofors even recommended that water-cooling be removed from older mountings. The Mark 2 gun barrel was also forged from monobloc steel to help with heat-wear from the lack of water-cooling. The Mark 2 mounting originally also had room for a gun operator, however, the compartment was too narrow for practicality and the wind-shield proved to be a source for radar-reflections, and was quickly replaced by a TV-camera.

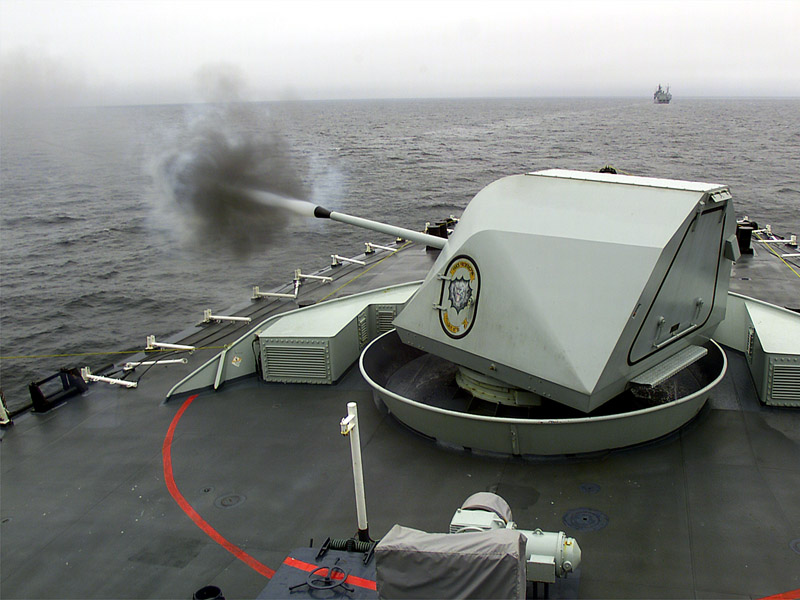
Bofors 57/70 Mark 2 firing from a Canadian Halifax-class frigate.

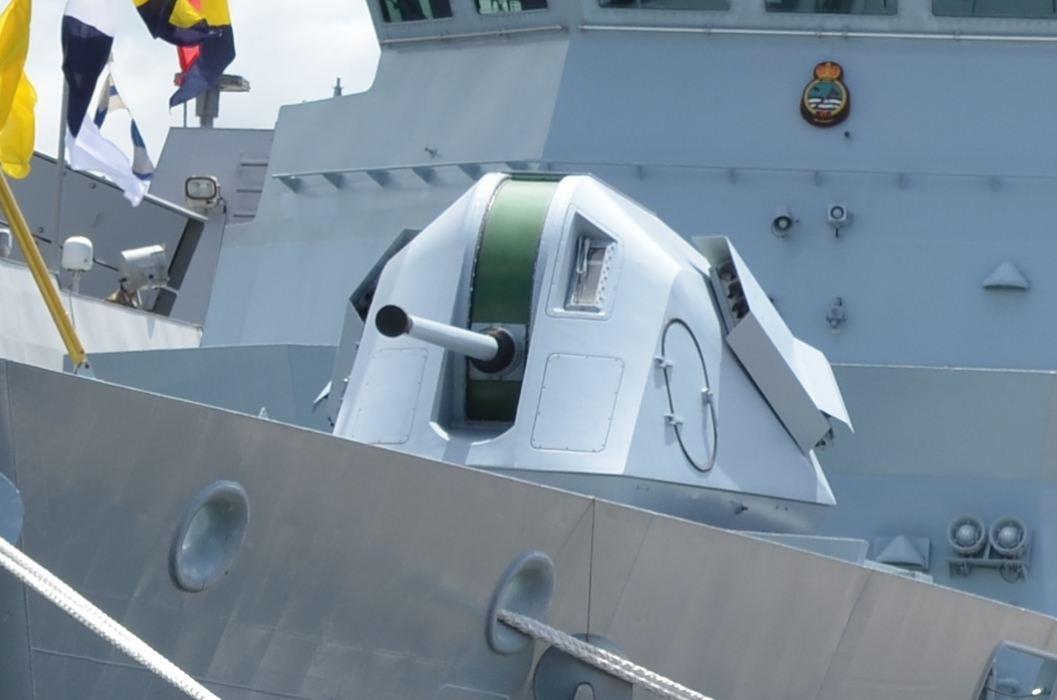
Bofors 57/70 Mark 2 on the Malaysian frigate Jebat.

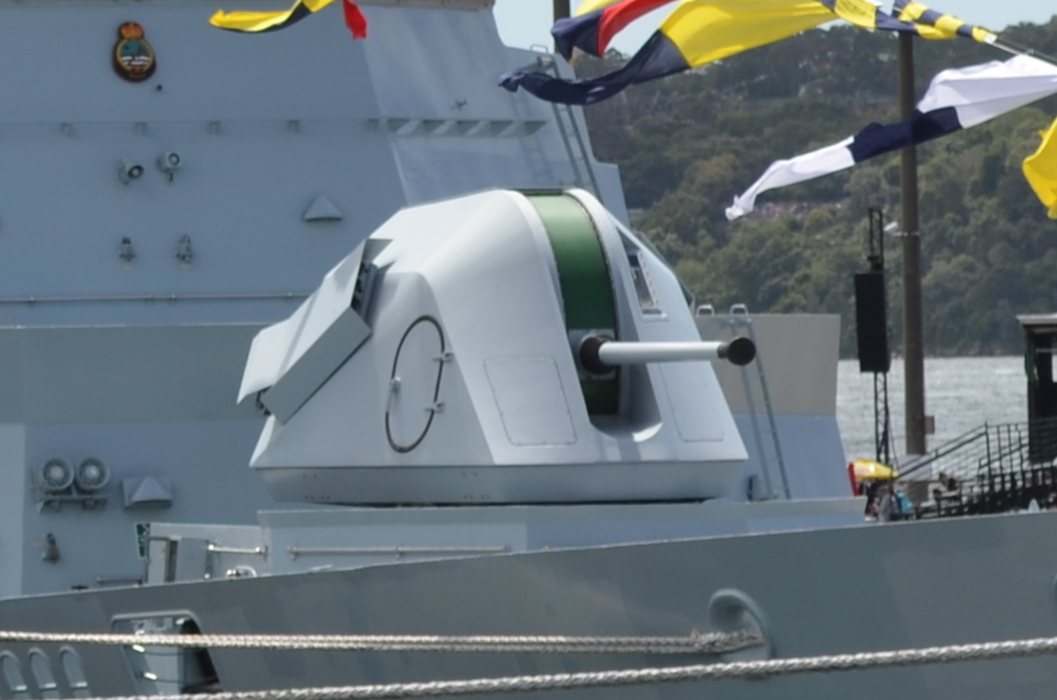
Bofors 57/70 Mark 2 on the Malaysian frigate Jebat.

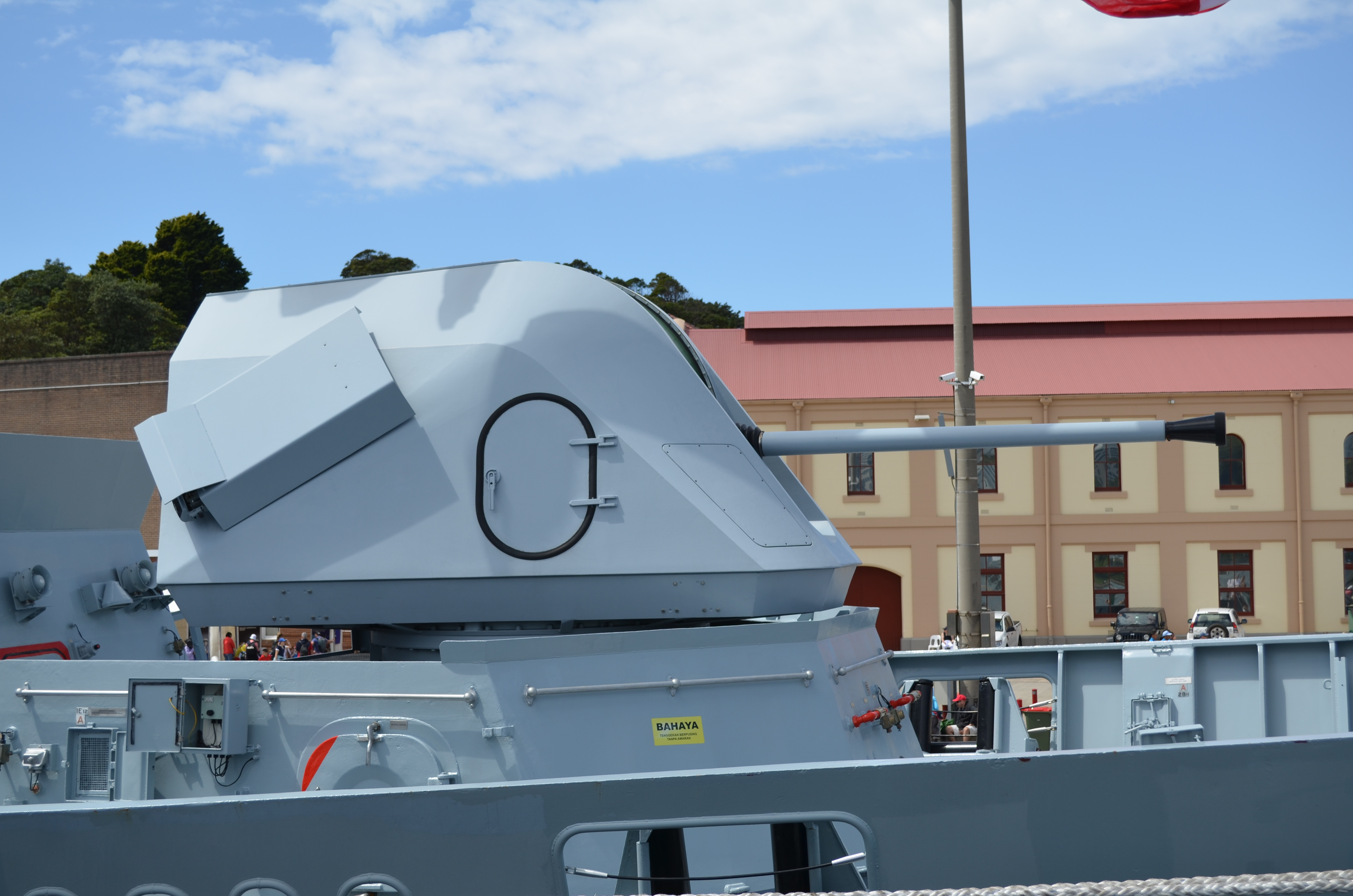
Bofors 57/70 Mark 2 on the Malaysian frigate Jebat.

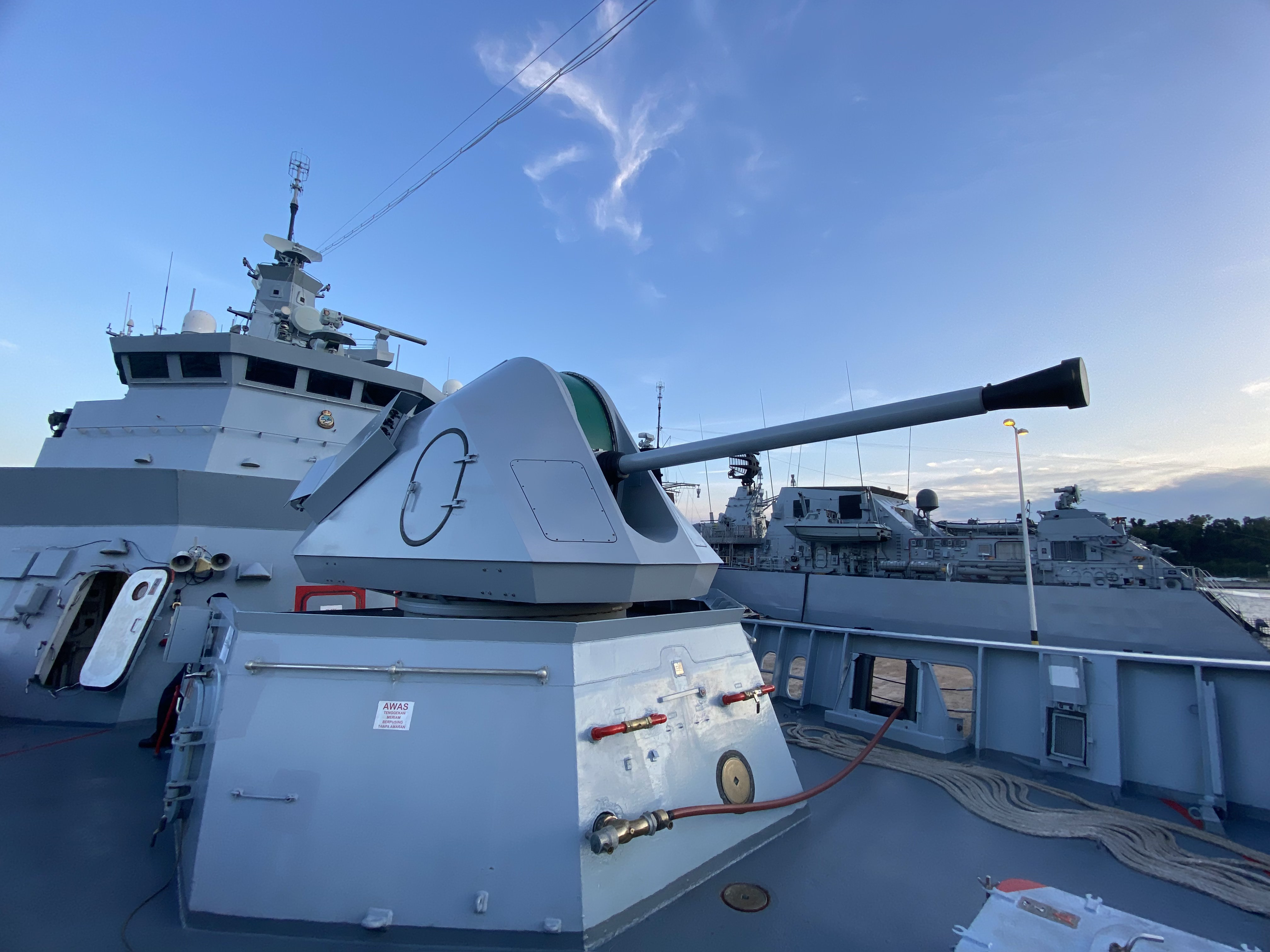
Bofors 57/70 Mark 2 on the Malaysian frigate Lekiu.

The 57 mm L/70 Mark 2 was introduced into the Swedish Navy in 1985 as the 57 mm automatpjäs 7103 (57 mm apj 7103) on the Stockholm-class corvette—HSwMS Stockholm (sister ship HSwMS Malmö was built in 1984 but armed with the older Mk1, subsequently retrofitted with the Mk2 in 2009). An improved version designated 57 mm automatpjäs 7103B (57 mm apj 7103B) was introduced in 1990 on the Göteborg-class corvette. Beyond Sweden the Mark 2 also saw adoption by Canada and four other navies. Bofors has manufactured a total of about 25 Bofors 57 mm L/70 Mark 2 guns.

=== Mark 3 ===
The latest development of the gun is the Mark 3, designed in 1995 for use on the then planned Visby-class corvette. The Mark 3 system has kept the same rate of fire and ammunition capacity as the previous Mark 2 system but has added many features to make it a modern system. Some of the primary changes includes: the ability to use Bofors 3P all-target programmable ammunition, the addition of a small muzzle velocity radar housed in a radome externally above the gun barrel for measuring the muzzle velocity of the departing projectiles for fire-control purposes, usually but not necessarily with the new Bofors 57 mm 3P ammunition, the ability to instantly change ammunition types by the use of a dual-feed system, another 1,000 rounds stowed in the standby rack beneath deck, as well as an improved fire control system. The Mark 3 system can also be operated/fired manually without the FC system using a joystick and video camera (mounted on the gun). The camera is fitted as standard.

For the Visby-class corvette Bofors also developed a new optional low radar profile (also known as low radar cross-section, or RCS) stealth mounting (also known as a cupola), which allows the gun to be hidden from radar and plain sight when not in use. The stealth mount/cupola is made of carbon-fibre-reinforced polymer and has a very distinctive angular, low signature.

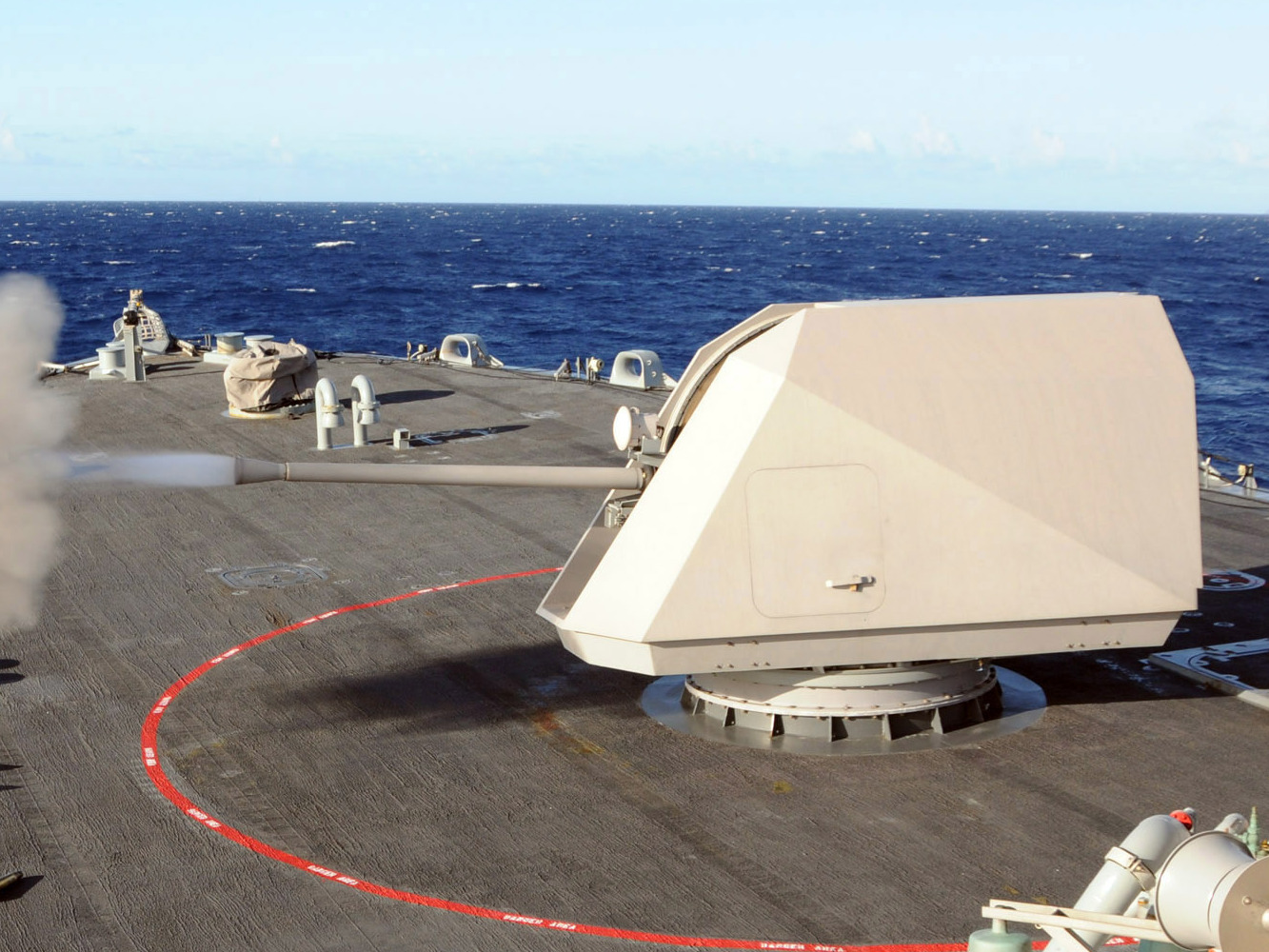
Bofors 57/70 Mark 3 (Mk 110) with standard mount firing from an American Freedom-class littoral combat ship.

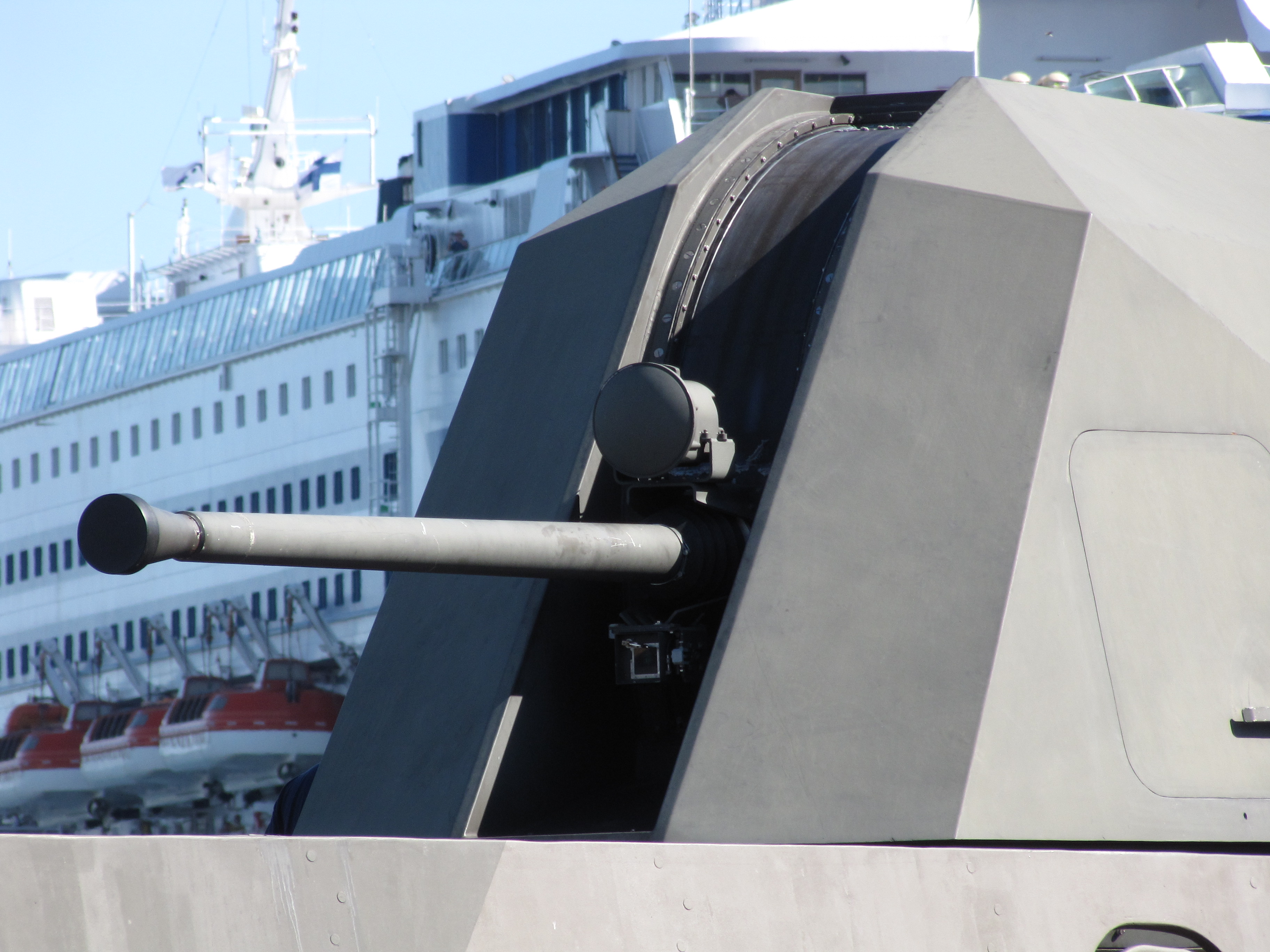
Bofors 57/70 Mark 3 with standard mount on Finnish missile boat Hamina-class missile boat.

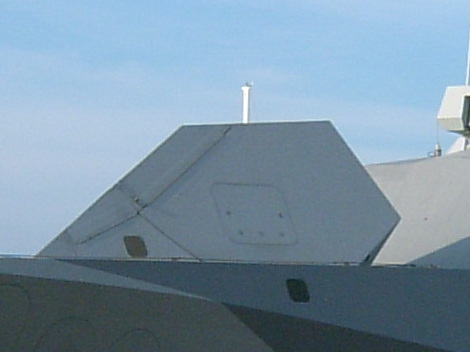
Bofors 57/70 Mark 3 with stealth mount in "transport mode" aboard a Visby-class corvette.

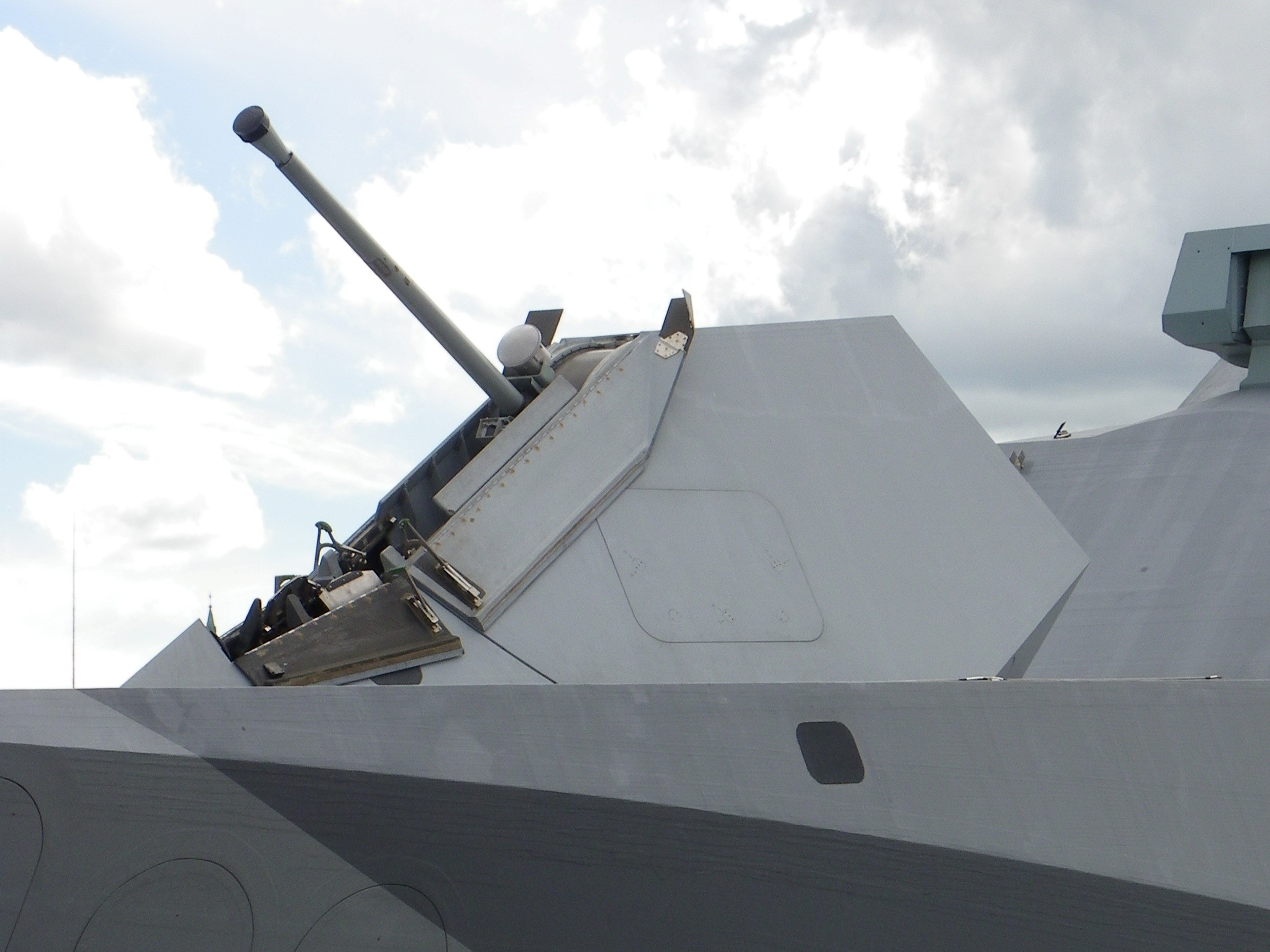
Bofors 57/70 Mark 3 with stealth mount in "fire mode" aboard a Visby-class corvette.

The Bofors 57 mm SAK L/70 Mk3 was introduced into service with the Visby-class corvette—fitted on HSwMS Visby in the year 2000. It has since also been adopted by a variety of nations, such as Finland and the United States. In American service, the United States Navy has designated the Mark 3 as the Mark 110 Mod 0 57mm gun. According to a BAE Systems press release dated 1 August 2005, the Mark 110 would be manufactured at the BAE Systems facility in Louisville, Kentucky. BAE Systems has been awarded a contract by General Dynamics to provide two additional Mk110 Naval Gun Systems for the Independence variant of the US Navy's (USN's) Littoral Combat Ship (LCS).

== Ammunition ==
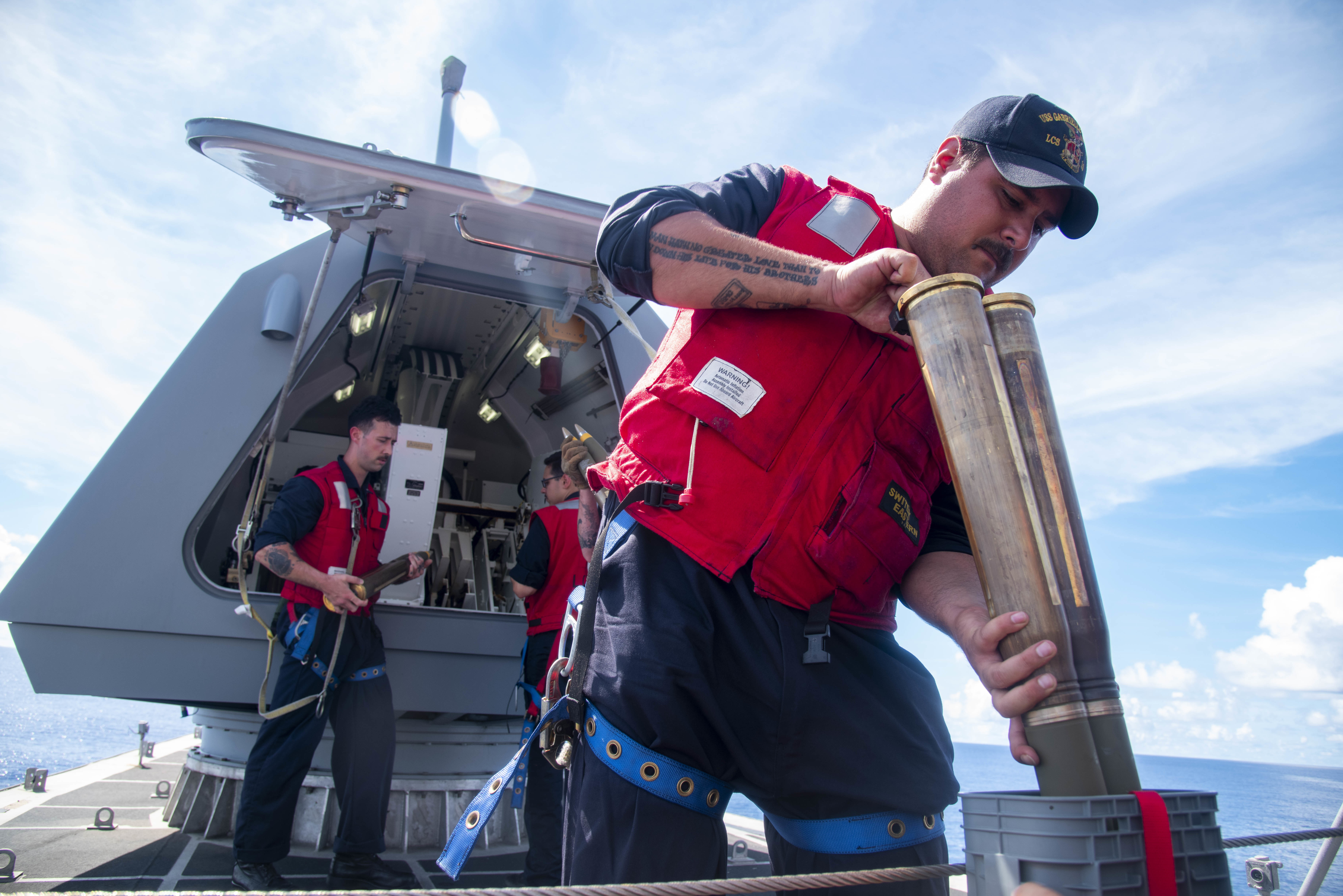
Sailors load ammunition aboard USS Gabrielle Giffords

Ammunition for the Bofors 57 mm gun is produced by BAE Systems, Sako Limited in Finland, SME Ordnance in Malaysia and Nammo in Norway.

In 2006, BAE Systems AB began to offer the Bofors 57 mm 3P all-target programmable ammunition, this allows three proximity fuzing modes as well as settings for time, impact, and armor-piercing functions. This increases the flexibility and effectiveness of the gun system, which has further reduced the reaction time of the gun and it is possible to choose ammunition mode at the moment of firing, giving it the ability to switch rapidly between surface targets, air targets, and ground targets.

In April 2015, BAE Systems unveiled a new round for the Mk 110 in the design stage called the Mk 295 Mod 1 Ordnance for Rapid Kill of Attack Craft (ORKA), made to achieve one shot kills of surface and air threats. Answering a U.S. Navy requirement for increasing the accuracy and efficiency of naval rounds, the ORKA leverages technology BAE Systems developed for larger 127 mm and 155 mm guided rounds, using a 4-canard actuation systems to guide the round. It is fitted with a multi-mode imaging semi-active seeker that can be guided through laser designation or autonomous targeting by downloading image of the target prior to firing; ORKA retains the 3P multiple fuzing modes.

In December 2015, the U.S. Navy revealed they were working on developing a guided 57 mm round for its Mk 110 guns on the Littoral Combat Ship and other Navy and Coast Guard ships. Northrop Grumman was awarded a contract to develop a self-guided 57 mm shell for the Mk 110 in October 2023.

On 22 August 2017 L3 Mustang Technology (part of L3Harris Technologies) announced the completion of the Critical Design Review (CDR) phase for the U.S. Navy's MK 332 Mod 0 High-Explosive, 4-Bolt Guided (HE-4G) projectile. The round was developed from the Advanced Low-Cost Munitions Ordnance (ALaMO) program. It is intended for use on the LCS and the new fast Frigate, and the US Coast Guard's Legend and Heritage class cutters.

== Variants ==
Bofors 57 mm SAK L/70 Mk1
Baseline version from 1970. 200 rounds per minute rate of fire, water-cooled.
- 57 mm automatpjäs 7101 (57 mm apj 7101) – Swedish navy version with two ammunition hoists.
- 57 mm automatpjäs 7102 (57 mm apj 7102) – Swedish navy version with one ammunition hoist.

Bofors 57 mm SAK L/70 Mk2
Improved version from 1981. 220 rounds per minute rate of fire, lighter weight, new servo system, no water-cooling.
- 57 mm automatpjäs 7103 (57 mm apj 7103) – Swedish navy version for the Stockholm-class corvette.
- 57 mm automatpjäs 7103B (57 mm apj 7103B) – Swedish navy improved version for the Göteborg-class corvette.
- 57 mm allmålskanon Mk2 – Post 2001 designation for the 57 mm apj 7103A and 7103B.

Bofors 57 mm SAK L/70 Mk3
Improved version from 1996 based on the Mk2. Ability to use programmable ammunition.
- 57 mm allmålskanon Mk3 – Swedish navy stealth version for the Visby-class corvette.
- 57 mm allmålskanon Mk3B – Swedish navy version. 57 mm allmålskanon Mk2 modified to be able to fire Mk3 programmable ammunition.
- 57 mm Mark 110 Mod 0 Naval Gun System – Slightly modified Mark 3 offered for use by the United States Coast Guard in 2004 and the United States Navy in 2006. The Bofors 57 mm programmable 3P ammunition is designated as Mark 295 Mod 0 in US service.

== Users ==
=== Mark 1 users ===
==== Systems in service ====
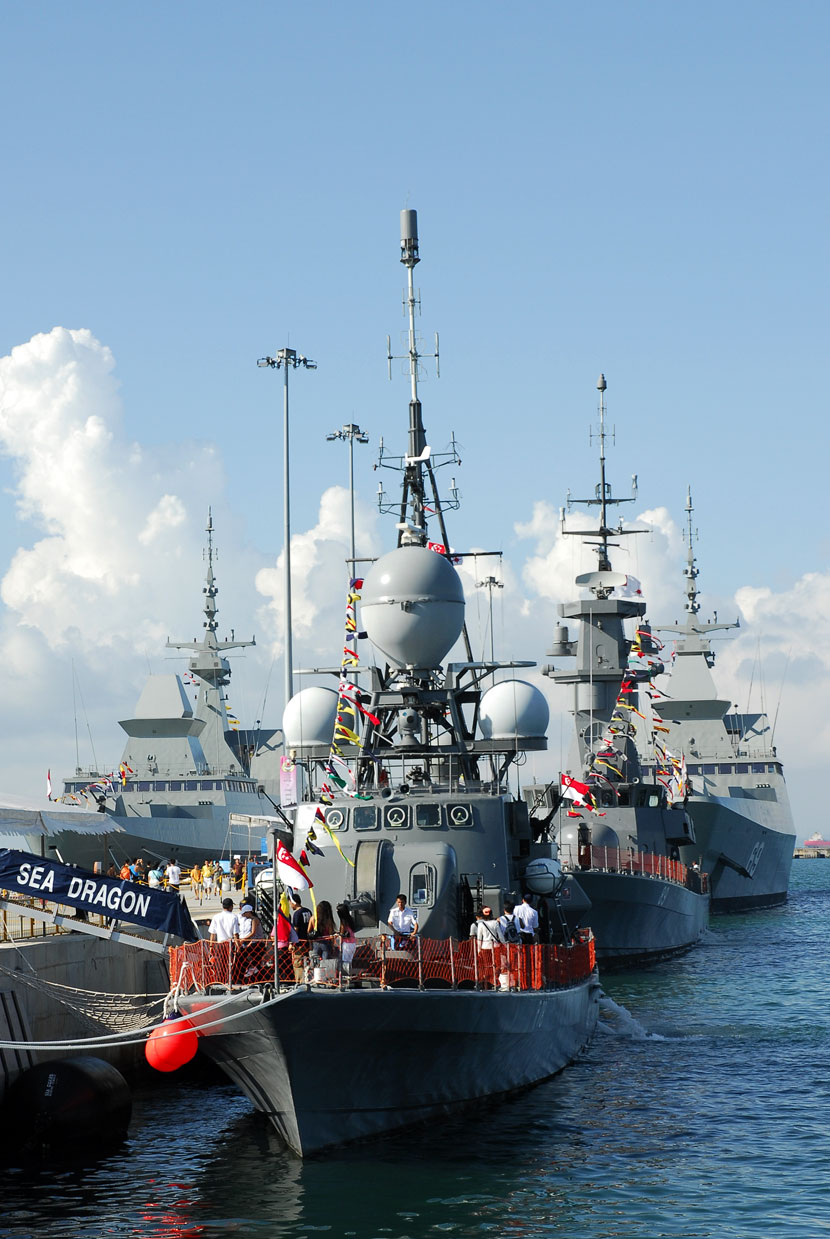
Singaporean RSS Sea Dragon with its Bofors 57 mm L/70 Mk1.

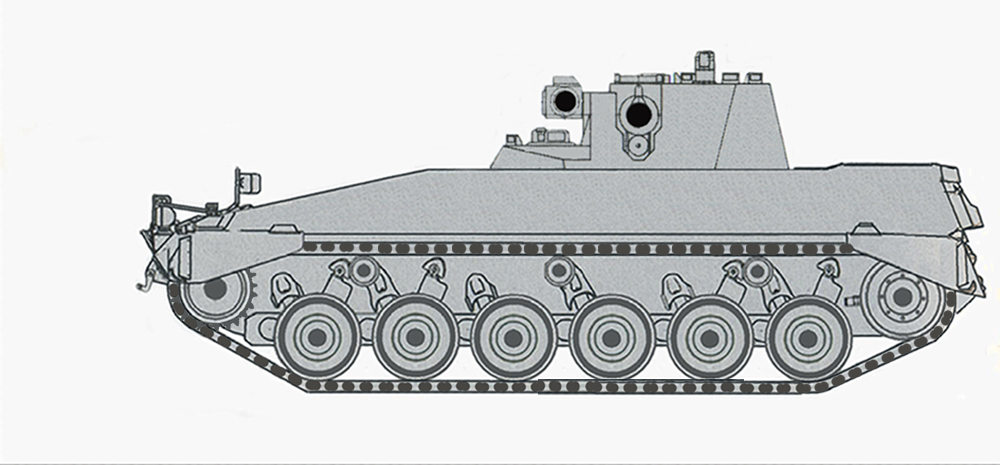

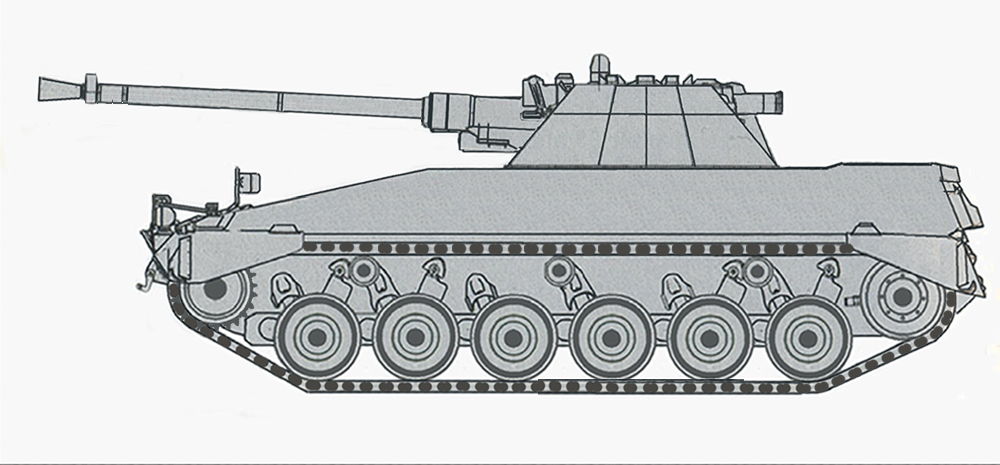
Line drawing of the Thyssen-Henschel-Bofors Begleitpanzer 57 AIFSV (Armored Infantry Fire Support Vehicle) prototype armed with the Bofors 57 mm L/70 Mk1.

Bangladesh
Bangladesh Navy:
- Sea Dragon-class patrol craft (BNS Madhumati): 1 cannon.
- Meghna-class patrol vessel (BNS Meghna): 1 cannon.
Croatia
Croatian Navy:
- Kralj-class missile boat: 2 cannons (1× per ship).
- Končar-class fast attack craft: 2 cannons (1× per ship).
- Helsinki-class missile boat (2 purchased second-hand from Finland, already equipped with cannons): 2 cannons (1× per ship).
Finland
Finnish Navy:
- Hämeenmaa-class minelayer: 2 cannons (1× per ship).
Indonesia
Indonesian Navy:
- KRI Bung Hatta corvette: 1 cannons (1× per ship).
  Interim use before being replaced by OTO Melara 76.
- Mandau-class fast attack craft: 4 cannons (1× per ship), 1 ship lost, 3 in service.
Malaysia
Royal Malaysian Navy:
- Kasturi-class corvette: 2 cannons (1× per ship).
- Perdana-class missile boat: 4 cannons (1× per ship).
- Handalan-class missile boat (SPICA-M): 4 cannons (1× per ship).
  Of the four boats, 3 remain active, 1 was lost.
- Jerung-class gunboat: 6 cannons (1× per ship).
  Of the six boats, 1 was decommissioned in 2026.
Montenegro
Montenegrin Navy:
- Končar-class fast attack craft: 2 cannons (1× per ship).
  2 ships inherited from the Yugoslavian Navy.
Thailand
Royal Thai Navy:
- Prabbrorapak -class Fast Attack Missile Craft, deriving from the Sea Wolf-class Missile Gun Boat, based on the Lurssen TNC 45):
  3 cannons (1× per ship).

==== Retired systems ====
Finland
Finnish Navy:
- Helsinki-class missile boat: 4 cannons (1× per ship).
  Of the 4 ships, all are retired, 2 were sold second-hand to Croatia.
Indonesia
Indonesian Navy:
- Dewantara class training vessels: 1 cannons (1× per ship), retired.
  Taken off from the retired vessel for use in firing range training.
  Removed from firing range to be temporarily used by KRI Bung Hatta before being replaced by OTO Melara 76.
- Mandau-class fast attack craft: 1 cannons (1× per ship), 1 ship lost in 2018.
Ireland
Irish Naval Service:
- LÉ Eithne ship: 1 cannon, retired in 2022.
Singapore
Republic of Singapore Navy:
- Sea Wolf-class Missile Gun Boat (based on Lurssen TNC 45): 6 cannons (1× per ship).
Sweden
Swedish Navy:
- HSwMS Carlskrona: boat with 2× guns initially before being removed (1× in 2002 and 1× in 2016/17).
- Hugin-class Fast Attack Missile Vessel: 16 cannons (1× per ship).
- Norrköping-class missile boat: 12 cannons (1× per ship).
- Spica-class torpedo boat: 6 cannons (1× per ship).
Sweden / West Germany
Thyssen-Henschel and Bofors prototype: Begleitpanzer 57 AIFSV.
Yugoslavia
Yugoslavian Navy:
- Končar-class fast attack craft: 2 cannons (1× per ship).
  2 ships (Rade Končar and Ramiz Sadiku) transferred to the Serbia and Montenegro Navy, retired in 2006.

=== Mark 2 users ===
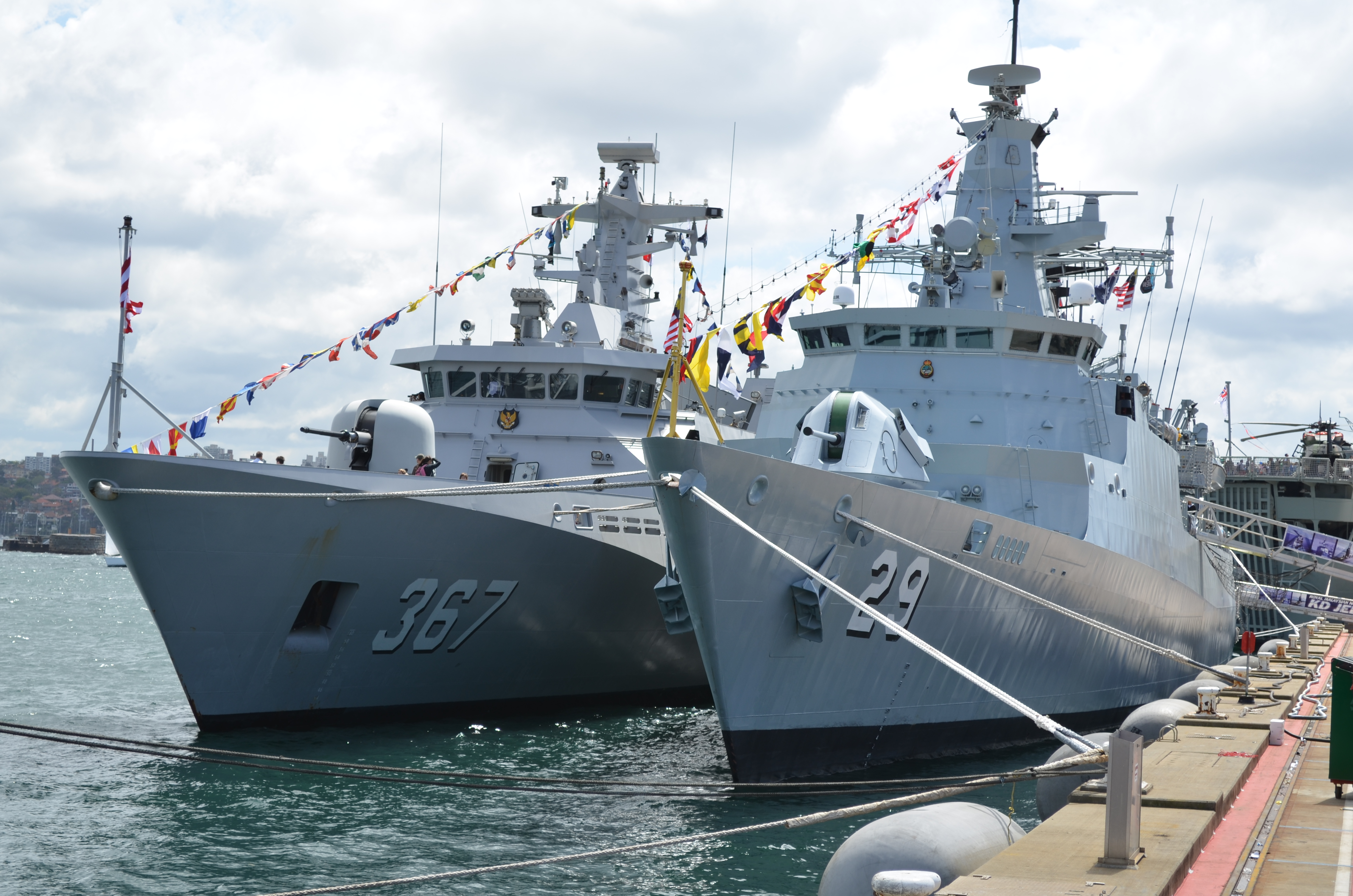
Malaysian frigate Jebat (right) during the Royal Australian Navy International Fleet Review 2013 with its Bofors 57 mm L/70 Mk2.

Canada
Royal Canadian Navy:
- Halifax-class frigate (initial configuration, replaced by the Mark 3 variant after the HCM / FELEX)
  Note: 12 frigates with 1× gun each + 1× gun for training + 1× spare gun.
Gabon
Gabonese Navy:
- P400-class patrol vessel: 2 cannons (1× per ship).
Indonesia
Indonesian Navy:
- FPB-57 Nav II-class torpedo boats: 2 cannons (1× per ship).
- FPB-57 Nav IV-class patrol boats: 2 cannons (1× per ship).
- FPB-57 Nav V-class patrol boats: 4 cannon (1× per ship).
Malaysia
Royal Malaysian Navy:
- Lekiu-class frigate: 2 cannons (1× per ship).
Sweden
Swedish Navy:
- Stockholm-class corvette: 2 cannons (1× per ship).
- Göteborg-class corvette: 4 cannons (1× per ship).

=== Mark 3 users ===
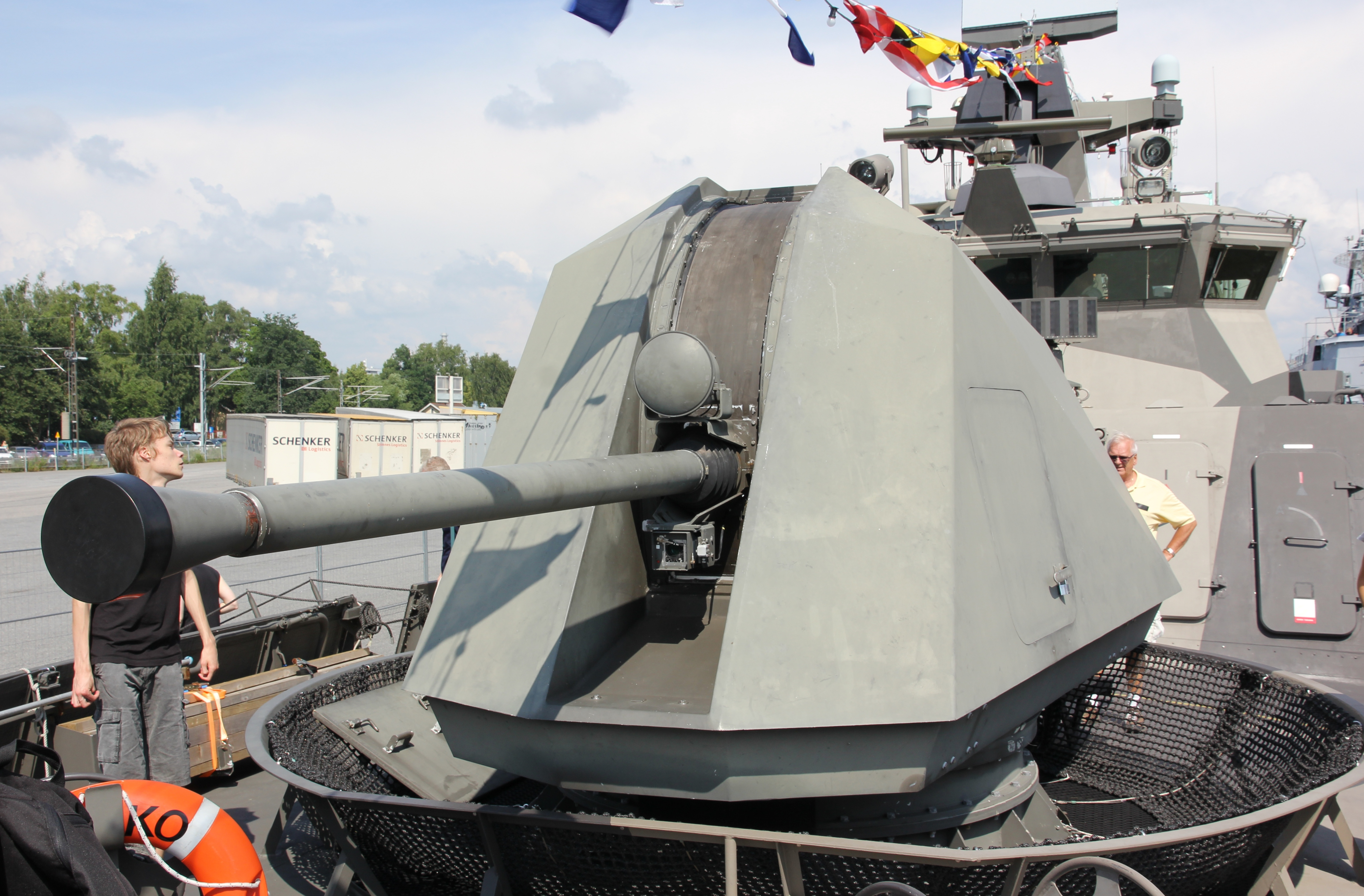
Bofors 57 mm Mk3 on Finnish missile boat Hanko

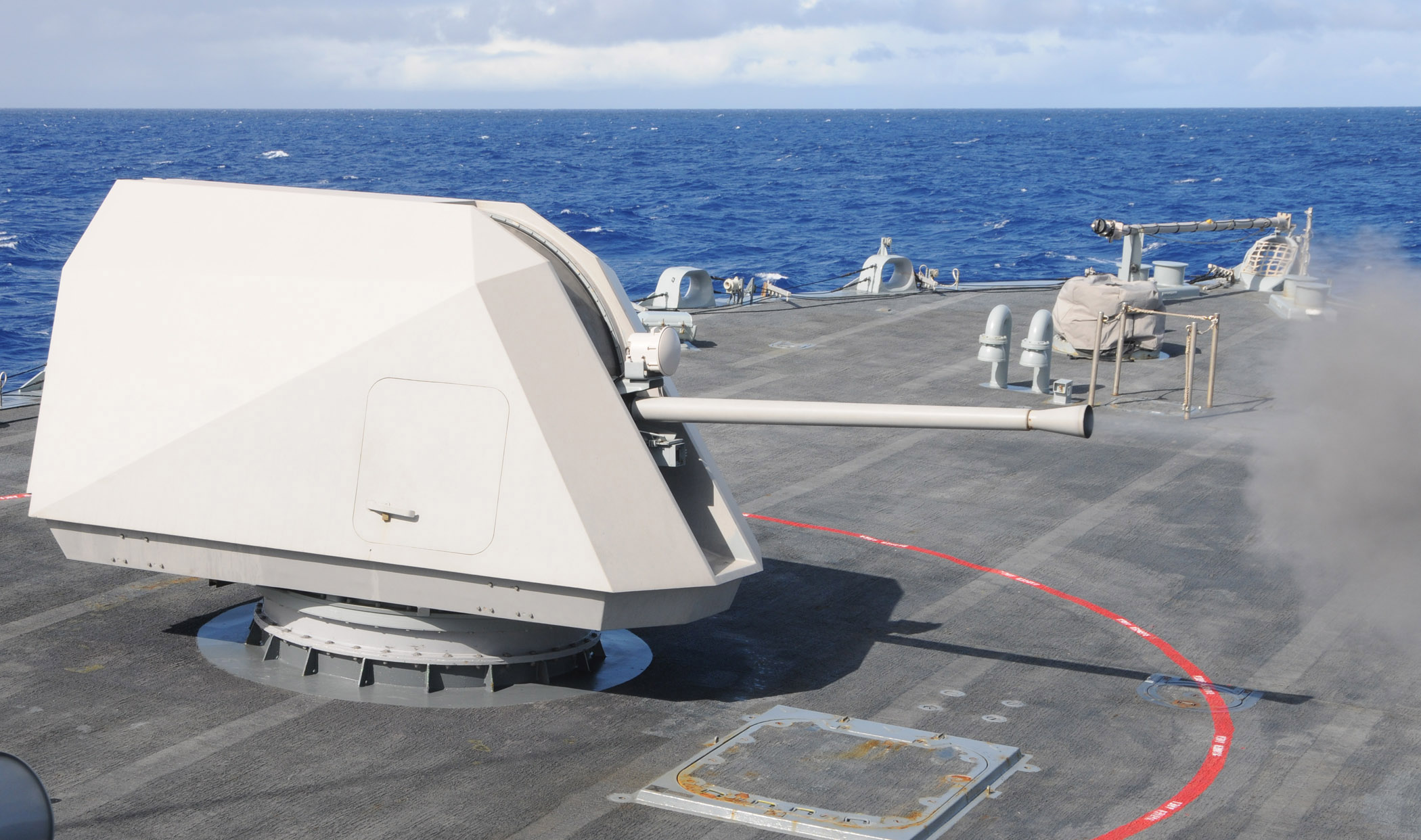
USS Freedom firing its 57 mm Mk 110 Mod 0 gun.

Brunei
Royal Brunei Navy:
- Darussalam-class offshore patrol vessel: 4 cannons (1× per ship).
Canada
Royal Canadian Navy:
- Halifax-class frigate (replaced by the 57 Mark 3 variant after the HCM / FELEX)
  Note: 12 frigates with 1× gun each + 1 gun for training + 1 spare gun.
Finland
Finnish Navy:
- Hamina-class missile boat: 4 cannons (1× per ship, replaced by the Bofors 40 Mk4 after the MLU of the class.
- Pohjanmaa-class corvette: reuse of the 4 cannons from the Hamina class.
Germany
German Federal Coast Guard:
- Potsdam-class patrol boat: 3 cannons (1× per ship).
Indonesia
Indonesian Navy:
- Sampari-class fast attack craft: 4 cannons (1× for each of the last four ships of the class).
Malaysia
Royal Malaysian Navy:
- Maharaja Lela-class frigate: 5 cannons (1× per ship, ships under construction).
Mexico
Mexican Navy:
- Durango-class patrol vessel: 4 cannons (1× per ship, ships under construction).
- Oaxaca-class patrol vessel: 3 cannons (1× per ship, 3 last ships of the class).
- Reformador-class corvette POLA: 2 cannons (1× per ship).
- Sierra-class corvette: 4 cannons (1× per ship).
Norway
Norwegian Coast Guard:
- KV Svalbard OPV / icebreaker (1 cannon).
- Jan Mayen-class offshore patrol vessel: 3 cannons (1× per ship).
Sweden
Swedish Navy:
- Visby-class corvette: 5 cannons (1× per ship).
United Arab Emirates
United Arab Emirates Navy:
- Arialah-class offshore patrol vessel: 2 cannons (1× per ship).
United Kingdom
Royal Navy:
- Type 31-class frigate:5 cannons (1× per ship, all in construction).
United States
US Coast Guard:
- Heritage-class offshore patrol cutter: 5 cannons (1× per ship, all in construction).
- Legend-class national security cutter: 5 cannons (1× per ship).
US Navy:
- Freedom-class littoral combat ship: 16 cannons (1× per ship, 6 ships already retired).
- Independence-class littoral combat ship: 19 cannons (1× per ship, 2 ships already retired).

=== Mark 3b users ===
Sweden
Swedish Navy:
- Stockholm-class corvette (2 cannons, 1× per ship)
- Gävle-class patrol vessel (2 cannons, 1× per ship)

== See also ==
- Bofors 40 mm L/60 gun
- Bofors 40 mm Automatic Gun L/70
- Bofors 57 mm m/47 aircraft gun
- Bofors 57 mm Naval Automatic Gun L/60
- Bofors 57 mm Automatic Anti-Aircraft Gun L/60
- List of naval guns by caliber
