= Jerung-class gunboat =

Class of gunboats in service with the Royal Malaysian Navy

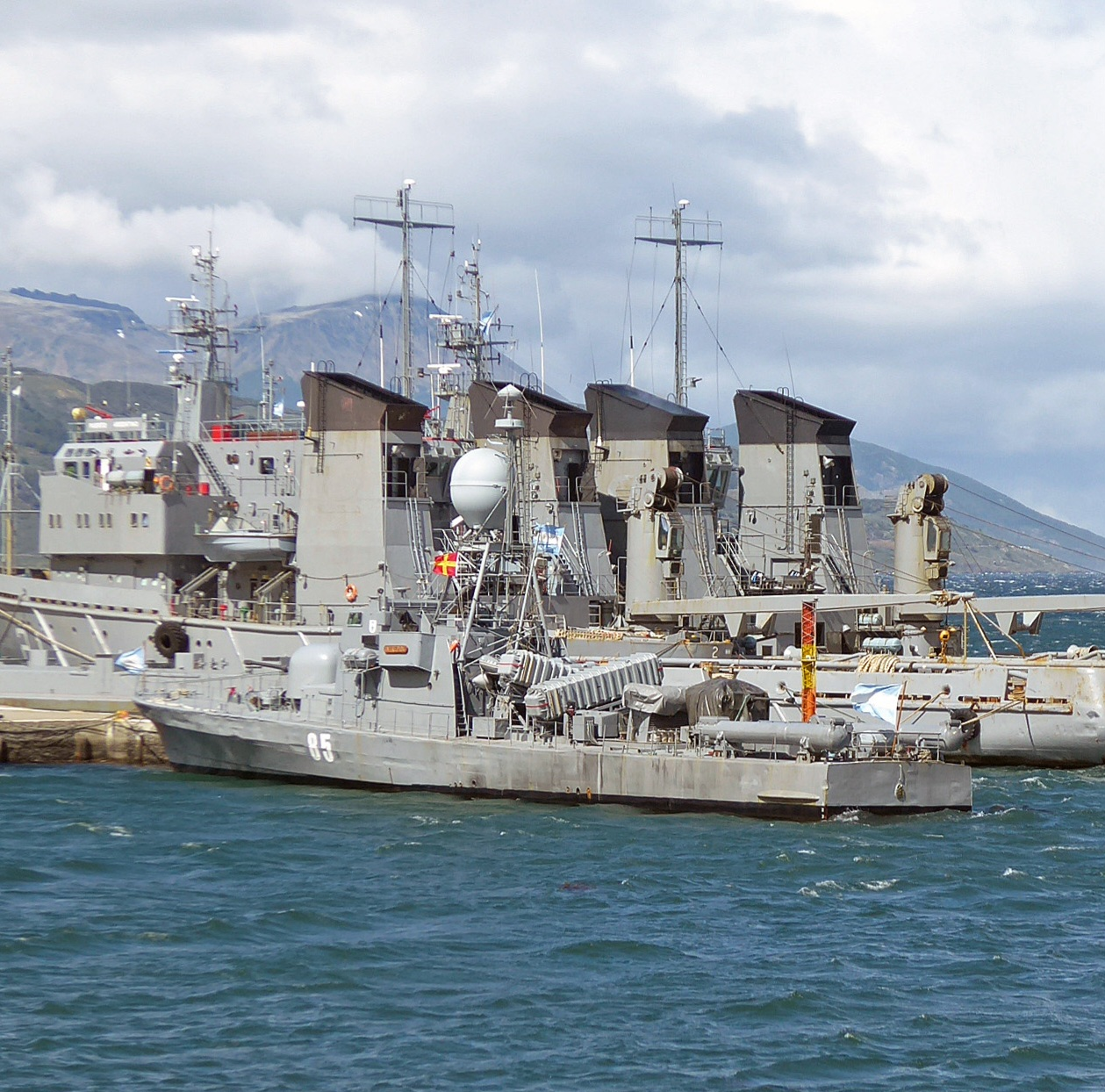
- Argentine Intrépida-class vessel which is the Jerung class is almost identical except for a lighter gun-only armament

Class overview
- Name: Jerung class
- Builders: Hong Leong-Lürssen
- Operators: Royal Malaysian Navy
- Preceded by: Kris class
- In commission: 1976 – present
- Completed: 6
- Active: 5
- Retired: 1

General characteristics
- Type: Fast attack craft
- Displacement: 210 t standard; 255 tons full load
- Length: 44.90 m (147 ft 4 in)
- Beam: 7 m (23 ft 0 in)
- Draught: 2.5 m (8 ft 2 in)
- Installed power: 3 × MTU 16V 538 TB90 diesels, 9,900 hp (7,382 kW)
- Propulsion: Three shafts
- Speed: 32 knots (59 km/h; 37 mph)
- Range: 2,000 nautical miles (3,700 km; 2,300 mi) at 15 knots (28 km/h; 17 mph)
- Complement: 36
- Sensors & processing systems: Radar : Decca 1226, Kelvin-Hughes MS32 radar, Naja Optronic director used with WM28 fire control radar; Combat system : AMOCS
- Armament: 1 × Bofors 57 mm gun; 1 × Bofors 40 mm gun

The Jerung class is a class of gunboats in service with the Royal Malaysian Navy. This class is based on the same design as the Intrépida-class fast attack craft in service with Argentine Navy, the Lurssen FPB/TNC-45 fast attack craft and are built locally by Malaysia-Germany joint venture, Hong Leong-Lurssen Shipyards. The Jerung class is equipped only with Bofors 57 mm gun and Bofors 40 mm gun for close-in combat and fire support, unlike other fast attack crafts in Malaysian service which are armed with anti-ship missiles. Peacetime duties include patrol of the exclusive economic zone, interception of illegal immigrants and anti-piracy operations. They are too small and under-armed for use in conventional warfare or in open waters. In late 2020, Royal Malaysian Navy confirmed that this class of ship will be upgraded to lengthen the service period of older ships.

== Service history ==
KD Todak together with KD Jebat and KD Perak took part in the naval blockade in 2013 Lahad Datu standoff.

== Ships of the class ==
Pennant number	Name	Commissioned	Decommissioned
3505	KD Jerung	1976	
3506	KD Todak	1976	
3507	KD Paus	1976	
3508	KD Yu	1976	
3509	KD Baung	1977	
3510	KD Pari	1977	2026
