= Kris-class patrol craft =

1964 Malaysian patrol ship class

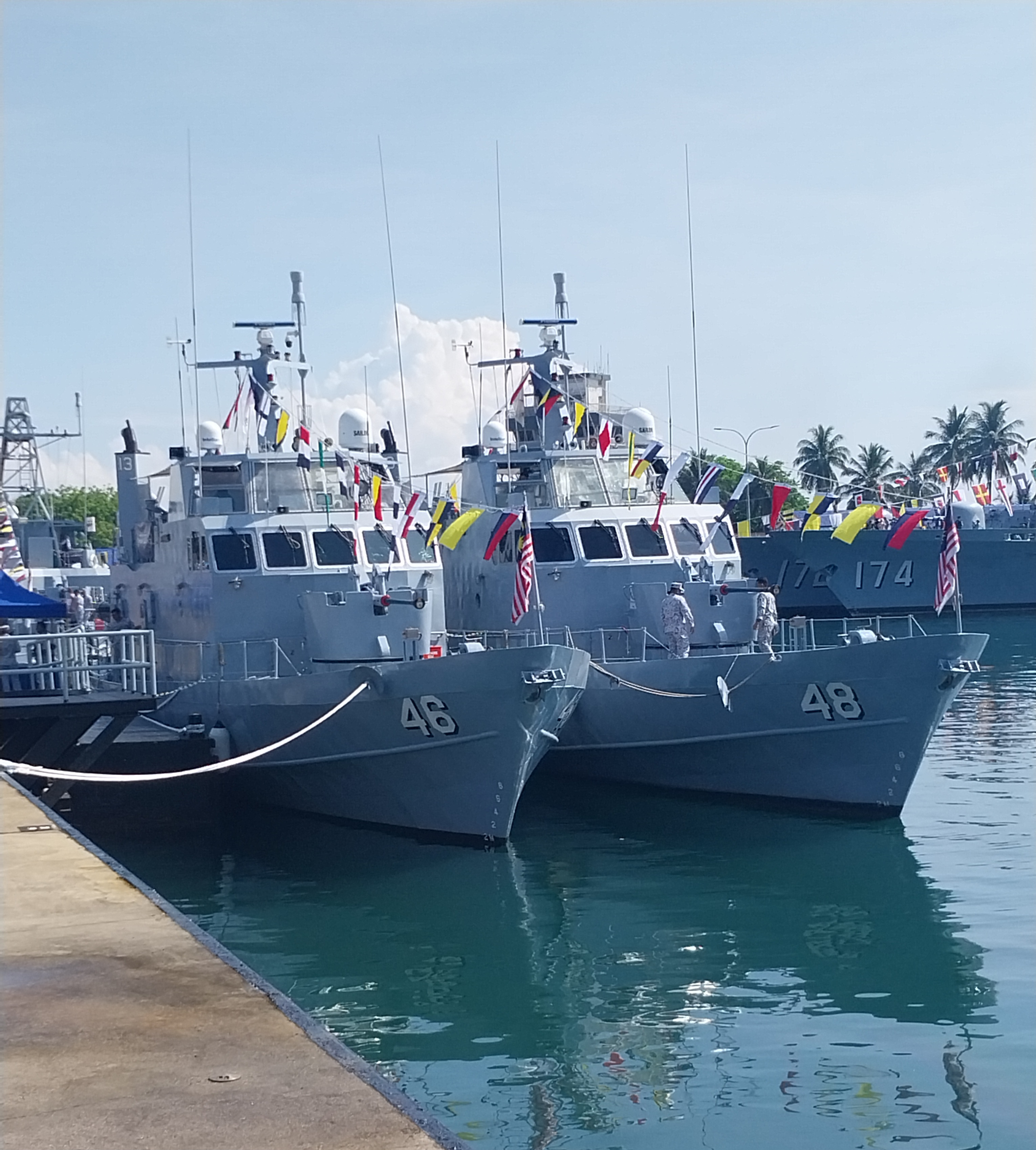
- KD Sri Sabah (46) and KD Sri Sarawak (48) berthed at RMN Tanjung Gelang

Class overview
- Name: Kris class
- Builders: Vosper Ltd
- Operators: Royal Malaysian Navy; Malaysian Maritime Enforcement Agency (retired)
- Subclasses: Kris-subclass; Sabah-subclass
- In service: 1964 – present
- Completed: 18
- Active: 4
- Retired: 14

General characteristics
- Type: Patrol craft/Gunboat
- Displacement: 109 tonnes
- Length: 32 m (105.0 ft)
- Beam: 6 m (19.7 ft)
- Draught: 1.1 m (3.6 ft)
- Propulsion: 2 MTU MD655/18
- Speed: 28.0 knots (52 km/h; 32 mph)
- Sensors & processing systems: Radar Decca TM 616; Collins 618T HF Transceiver; Racal PTR 171 UHF Transceiver
- Armament: 1 × Bofors 40 mm gun; 2 × 12.7 mm Browning M2HB machine gun

The Kris class is a series of patrol crafts designed and built for the Royal Malaysian Navy (RMN). The vessels meet the requirements of Malaysia's marine defense by providing the ability to counter low intensity combat such as anti-piracy and border patrol.

== Development ==
A total of 18 ships in two subclasses were ordered from Vosper Ltd in the 1960s to 1970s. Four ships are still in service as of 2023. Some of the retired ships were handed over to the Malaysian Maritime Enforcement Agency.

== Major operation ==
The Kris class was the oldest ships still in service with the RMN. These ships were involved in major operations of the Malaysia-Indonesia confrontation and Operation Terumbu to ensure the success of the Spratly Islands conquest.

== Ships of the class ==
Name	Pennant number	Builder	Launched	Commissioned	Decommissioned	Status
Kris-subclass
KD Kris	34	Vosper Ltd	1966	1966	2018	Transferred to Malaysian Maritime Enforcement Agency on 27 June 2006 and renamed as KM Lang (3132). Sunk to serve as an artificial reef.
KD Sundang	36	Vosper Ltd	1966	1966	2018	Active. Transferred to Malaysian Maritime Enforcement Agency on 27 June 2006 and renamed as KM Segantang (3133). Transferred back to Royal Malaysian Navy and recommissioned in 2024 as KD Sri Sabah (46).
KD Badek	37	Vosper Ltd	1966	1966	11 November 2014	Transferred to Malaysian Maritime Enforcement Agency on 27 June 2006 and renamed as KM Jarak (3134). Sunk to serve as an artificial reef off Redang Island, Terengganu.
KD Renchong	38	Vosper Ltd	1967	1967	17 September 2016	Transferred to Malaysian Maritime Enforcement Agency on 27 June 2006 and renamed as KM Kuraman (3139). Sunk to serve as an artificial reef near Gaya Island in Tunku Abdul Rahman National Park.
KD Tombak	39	Vosper Ltd	1967	1967	2015	Transferred to Malaysian Maritime Enforcement Agency on 27 June 2006 and renamed as KM Siamil (3140). Sunk to serve as an artificial reef near Payar Island Marine Park, Kedah.
KD Lembing	40	Vosper Ltd	1967	1967	11 November 2014	Transferred to Malaysian Maritime Enforcement Agency on 27 June 2006 and renamed as KM Ligitan (3145). Sunk to serve as an artificial reef off Perhentian Islands, Terengganu.
KD Serampang	41	Vosper Ltd	1967	1967	2018	Transferred to Malaysian Maritime Enforcement Agency on 27 June 2006. Scrapped.
KD Panah	42	Vosper Ltd	1967	1967	2018	Active. Transferred to Malaysian Maritime Enforcement Agency on 27 June 2006 and renamed as KM Kukup (3135). Transferred back to Royal Malaysian Navy and recommissioned in 2024 as KD Sri Sarawak (48).
KD Kerambit	43	Vosper Ltd	1967	1967	1 December 2014	Transferred to Malaysian Maritime Enforcement Agency on 27 June 2006 and renamed as KM Pemanggil (3141). Sunk to serve as an artificial reef off Kuraman Island, Labuan.
KD Beladau	44	Vosper Ltd	1967	1967	23 December 2014	Transferred to Malaysian Maritime Enforcement Agency on 27 June 2006 and renamed as KM Bidong (3142). Sunk to serve as an artificial reef off Rawa Island, Mersing, Johor.
KD Kelewang	45	Vosper Ltd	1967	1967	2015	Transferred to Malaysian Maritime Enforcement Agency on 27 June 2006 and renamed as KM Sempadi (3136). Sunk to serve as an artificial reef off Payar Island, Kedah.
KD Rentaka	46	Vosper Ltd	1967	1967	2018	Transferred to Malaysian Maritime Enforcement Agency on 27 June 2006 and renamed as KM Satang (3143). Scrapped.
KD Sri Perlis	47	Vosper Ltd	1968	1968		Active
KD Sri Johor	49	Vosper Ltd	1968	1968		Active
Sabah-subclass
KD Sri Sabah	3144	Vosper Ltd	1963	1964/2023	2018	Transferred to Malaysian Maritime Enforcement Agency on 27 June 2006 and renamed as KM Labas (3137).
KD Sri Sarawak	3145	Vosper Ltd	1963	1964/2023	2012	Transferred to Malaysian Maritime Enforcement Agency on 27 June 2006 and renamed as KM Sipadan (3131). Sunk to serve as an artificial reef off Tioman Island, Pahang.
KD Sri Negeri Sembilan	3146	Vosper Ltd	1963	1964	2017	Transferred to Malaysian Maritime Enforcement Agency on 27 June 2006 and renamed as KM Nyireh (3138). Sunk to serve as an artificial reef in 2017 off Payar Island Marine Park, Kedah.
KD Sri Melaka	3147	Vosper Ltd	1963	1964	2018	Transferred to Malaysian Maritime Enforcement Agency on 27 June 2006 and renamed as KM Rumbia (3144). Scrapped.
