= Bofors 57 mm m/54 anti-aircraft gun =

Bofors 57 mm M54
External image
- Bofors 57 mm m/54
- Bofors m/54
- Type: Anti-aircraft gun
- Place of origin: Sweden

Service history
- Used by: Sweden & Belgium

Production history
- Designer: Bofors

Specifications
- Mass: 8.1 t (8.0 long tons; 8.9 short tons)
- Barrel length: 3.42 m (11 ft 3 in) L/60
- Shell weight: 2.6 kg (5.7 lb)
- Caliber: 57 mm (2.2 in)
- Elevation: +90 ° to –5 °
- Traverse: 360 °
- Rate of fire: 120 rounds/min
- Muzzle velocity: 820 m/s (2,700 ft/s)
- Effective firing range: 4,000 m (4,400 yd) against aircraft
- Maximum firing range: 14,500 m (15,900 yd) horizontal
- References: Brassey's & Jane's

The Bofors 57 mm m/54 (57 mm luftvärnsautomatkanon m/54 or 57 mm lvakan m/54) was a wheeled automatic anti-aircraft gun for land based use produced by Bofors and developed from the similar Bofors 57 mm m/50 naval artillery gun. The gun was developed in the 1950s and fielded by both the Belgian and Swedish military.

The m/54 fired a 2.67 kg (5.9 lb) high explosive projectile at a muzzle velocity of 880 m/s (2,900 ft/s) and a rate of fire of 160 rounds per minute. Weighing in at 8.1 t (8.0 long tons; 8.9 short tons), the m/54 had an effective range of 4,000 m (13,000 ft). The ballistics of the m/54 at practical air defense altitudes were not particularly superior to those of the Bofors 40 mm AA gun, resulting in relatively few sales of the m/54.

== See also ==
- Bofors 57 mm Naval Automatic Gun L/60
- Bofors 57 mm Naval Automatic Gun L/70
