= KRI Bung Karno =

Corvette and presidential yacht of Indonesian Navy

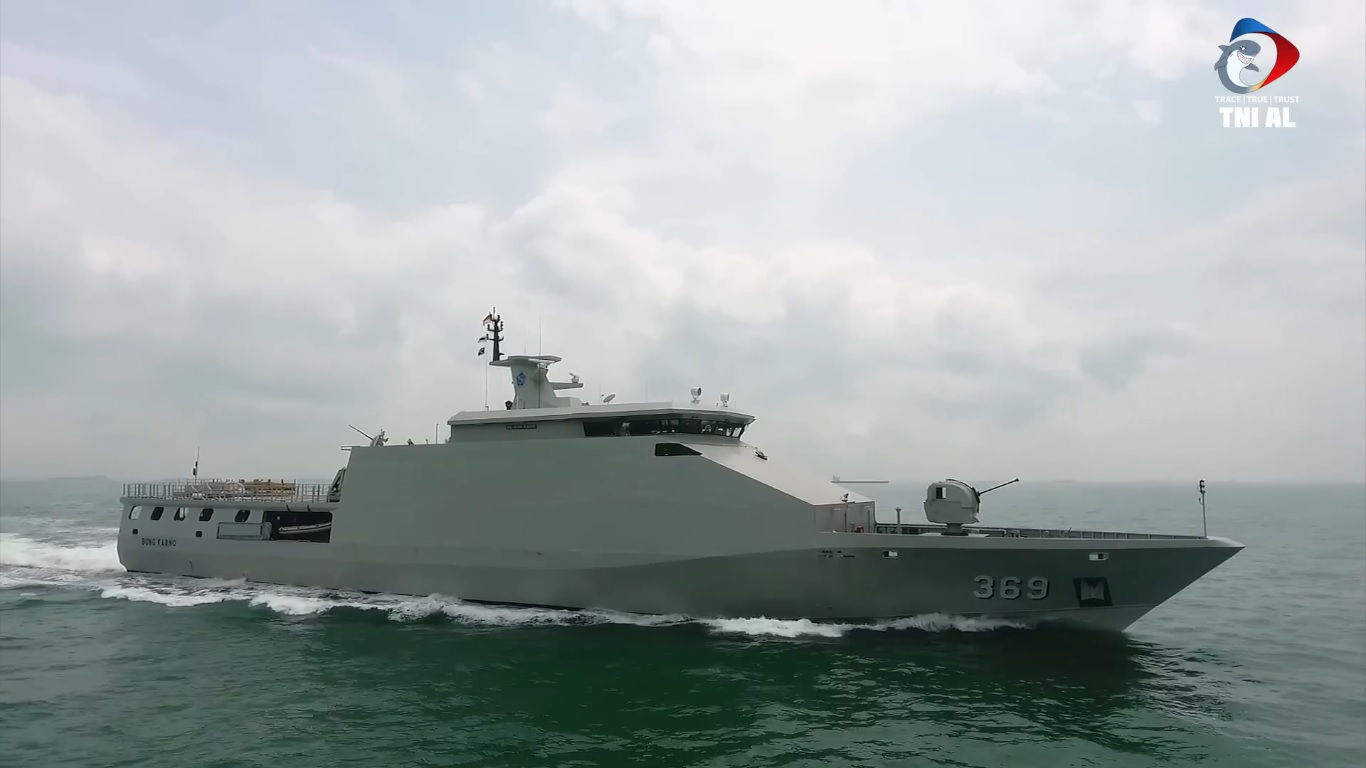
- KRI Bung Karno during sea trials, 2023

History

Indonesia
- Name: KRI Bung Karno
- Namesake: Sukarno
- Ordered: 25 May 2022
- Builder: PT Karimun Anugrah Sejati, Batam
- Cost: IDR 300 billion
- Laid down: 9 June 2022
- Launched: 19 April 2023
- Commissioned: 1 June 2023
- Home port: Tanjungpinang
- Identification: IMO number: 4772326; MMSI number: 525114116; Callsign: YDTO2; Pennant number: 369
- Motto: Berani Ksatria Nararya
- Status: In active service
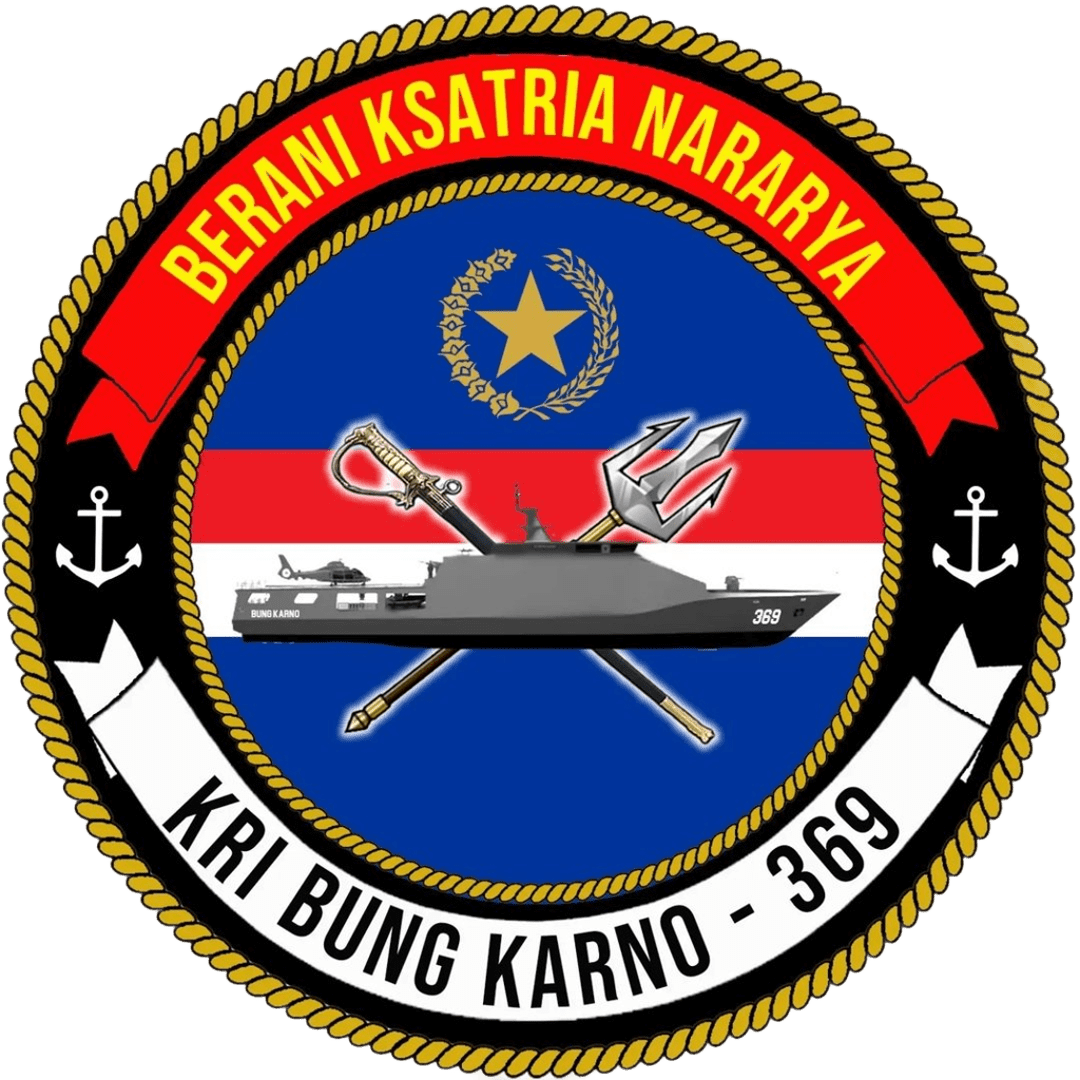
- Badge

General characteristics
- Type: Bung Karno-class corvette
- Displacement: 650 tonnes (640 long tons)
- Length: 73 m (239 ft 6 in)
- Beam: 12 m (39 ft 4 in)
- Draft: 2.3 m (7 ft 7 in)
- Propulsion: 2 × diesel engines, 4,000 kW (5,400 shp); 3 × diesel generators
- Speed: 25 knots (46 km/h)
- Endurance: 5 days
- Complement: 55
- Armament: 1 × 40 mm Leonardo OTO Marlin 40; 2 × 20 mm Yugoimport M71/08 guns; FFBNW; 2 × twin SIMBAD SAM (4 missiles); AShM, torpedoes
- Aircraft carried: 1 × helicopter (AS565 Panther)
- Aviation facilities: Flight deck

KRI Bung Karno (369) is a corvette and presidential yacht of the Indonesian Navy. Designated as "VVIP and Presidential Helicopter-carrying Guided-missile Corvette" (Indonesian: Korvet Rudal Heli VVIP dan Kepresidenan), the ship was named after the First President of Indonesia Sukarno and entered service in June 2023.

== Design and description ==
Bung Karno has a length of 73 m (240 ft), beam of 12 m (39 ft), draft of 2.3 m (7.5 ft), and displacement of 650 tonnes (640 long tons). The corvette is powered by two diesel engines generating 4,000 kW (5,400 shp), and it also has three diesel generators. The ship has a top speed of 25 knots (46 km/h) and cruising speed of 20 knots (37 km/h), the ship has 5 days endurance at sea. Bung Karno has a complement of 55 personnel.

The ship was planned to be armed with one Leonardo's OTO Marlin 40 ILOS naval gun, two 20 mm autocannons and MBDA SIMBAD surface-to-air missiles. In "fitted for but not with" (FFBNW) scheme, the corvette was planned to be fitted with torpedo, sonar, anti-ship missiles, and IFF, ESM and CSM systems in the future. As built, the ship was armed with one Bofors 40mm L/70 gun at the bow and two 20 mm Yugoimport M71/08 guns at each sides of the rear superstructure. The manually operated 40mm Bofors gun served as the interim main gun of the corvette until the Marlin 40 ILOS weapon system was finally installed on the ship in late 2023.

Bung Karno also able to carry a Eurocopter AS565 Panther helicopter and has a flight deck similar to Bung Tomo-class corvette.

In its role as presidential yacht, Bung Karno will be replacing KRI Barakuda (633). The ship was planned to have bulletproof VVIP accommodation and able to function as command ship in times of emergency.

== Construction and career ==
Contract for the construction of the corvette was signed on 25 May 2022. The ship's construction was begun with first steel cutting and keel laying ceremony on 9 June 2022 at PT Karimun Anugrah Sejati shipyard in Batam, Riau Islands. On 20 June, the corvette was officially named as KRI Bung Karno (369) in the ship naming ceremony by then-Chief of Staff of the Navy Admiral Yudo Margono and Megawati Sukarnoputri, the 5th President of Indonesia and daughter of the ship's namesake.

The ship was launched on 19 April 2023. The ship was launched by Chief of Staff of the Navy Admiral Muhammad Ali. Bung Karno was commissioned on 1 June 2023, coinciding with Pancasila Day public holiday, at Military Sealift Command Headquarters in North Jakarta. The commissioning ceremony was attended by high ranking officers of the Armed Forces and family members of the ship's namesake, including Megawati Sukarnoputri, Sukmawati Sukarnoputri, Guruh Sukarnoputra, and Puan Maharani.

Bung Karno took part in the 4th Multilateral Naval Exercise Komodo 2023 which was held in the Makassar Strait on 5–7 June 2023. The Commander of the Indonesian Armed Forces and a number of the participating navies' commanders were present on the corvette to review the joint exercise.

The corvette undergo Sea Acceptance Test (SAT) for its Leonardo Marlin 40 weapon system in the Java Sea on 1 July 2024.
