= Payar Island =

Island in Malaysia

Native name: Pulau Payar
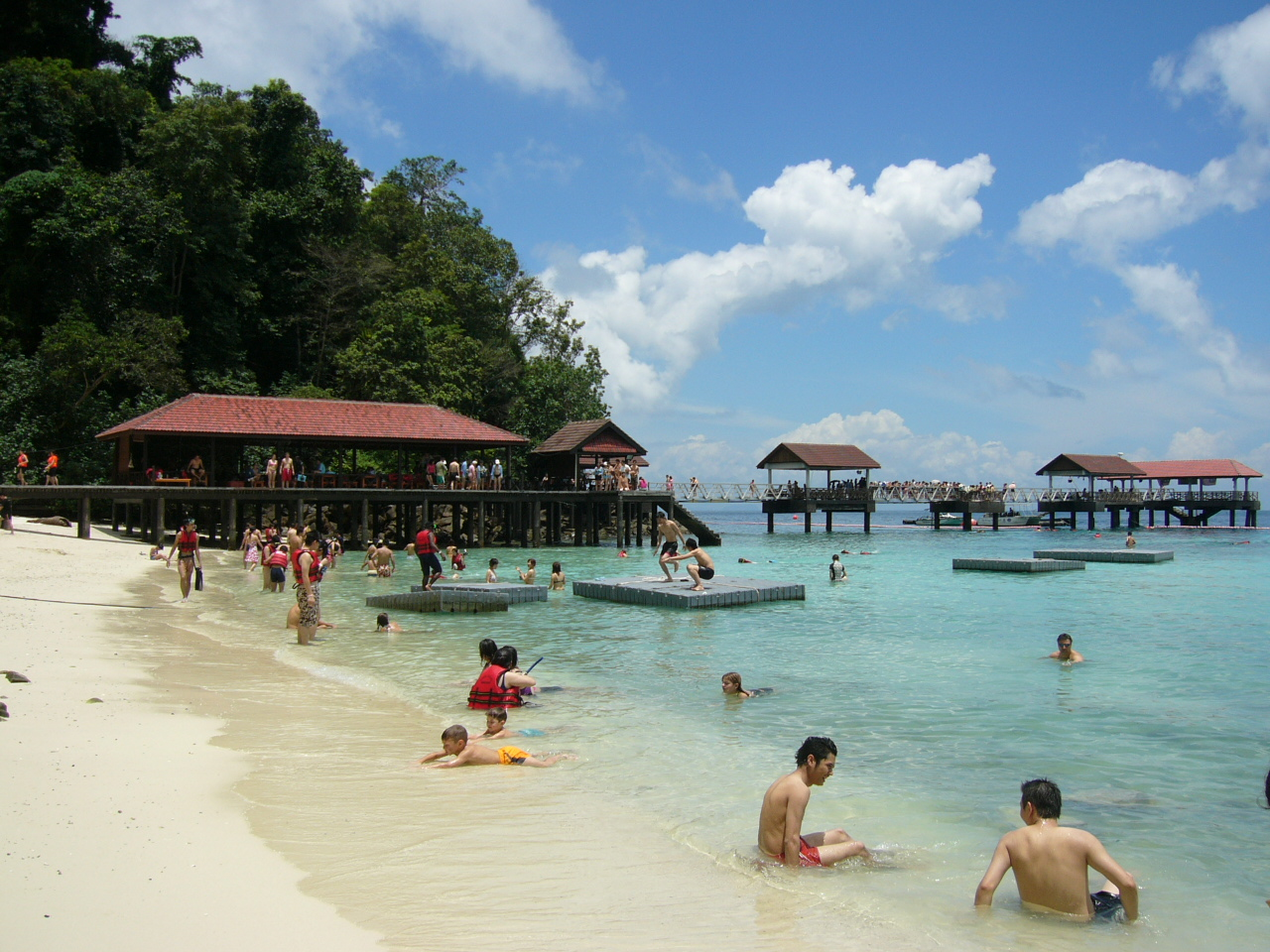
- A pier on the east side of the island

Geography
- Location: Strait of Malacca
- Coordinates: 6°3.752′N 100°2.4′E
- Area: 0.29 km^{2} (0.11 sq mi)

Administration
- Malaysia
- State: Kedah
- District: Kota Setar
- Mukim: Kuala Kedah

Payar Island (Malay: Pulau Payar) is an island in Kedah, Malaysia with a namesake marine park that offers protection for its diverse marine life. It is a snorkelling and diving site famous for its corals.

The Payar Island Marine Park is situated in the northern part of the Strait of Malacca, 19 nautical miles (35 km) south of Langkawi and encompasses the islands of Payar, Kaca and Lembu (east of Payar) and Segantang (13 kilometres (8.1 mi) west of Payar) which are surrounded by coral reefs. The marine park teems with a diversity of marine life and vegetation.

Many endangered species of fishes and marine organisms live within the sanctuary. Measuring 2 km long and 1/4 km wide, Payar Island is the most popular of the islands as its sheltered waters are ideal are for snorkelling, diving and swimming. Among the dive spots is the "Coral Garden", an area covered with bright, multi-hued soft corals.

There are boat services linking Kuah, Langkawi to the island.

== Coral Bleaching ==
Due to excessive carrying capacity and persistently extreme sea water temperatures, the Payar Island Marine Park suffered from widespread coral bleaching at a critical level in the second half of 2010. Furthermore, marine life density around the area has been recorded to be significantly lesser compared to previous years. In response, the Department of Marine Park Kedah has closed the affected areas in order to minimise human aggravated stress on the corals.

The mass bleaching became even more severe by 2016 due to the prolonged El Nino phenomenon which started in mid 2015 affecting more than half the reefs in Thailand and Peninsular Malaysian waters.

== Reopen to Public with Strict Standards ==
Kedah Fisheries Department introduces certain guidelines to help preserve the marine park and only allowing tour operators registered with them to conduct tourism activities in the marine park.

The Payar Island Marine Park will be limiting visitors to 100 per week in a bid to preserve its biodiversity. The park will be closed to tourists on Tuesdays and Wednesdays every week and it will also be closed for tourists between March and May each year to preserve the park.
