= USCGC Cypress =

United States Coast Guard cutter

USCGC Cypress (WLB-210)
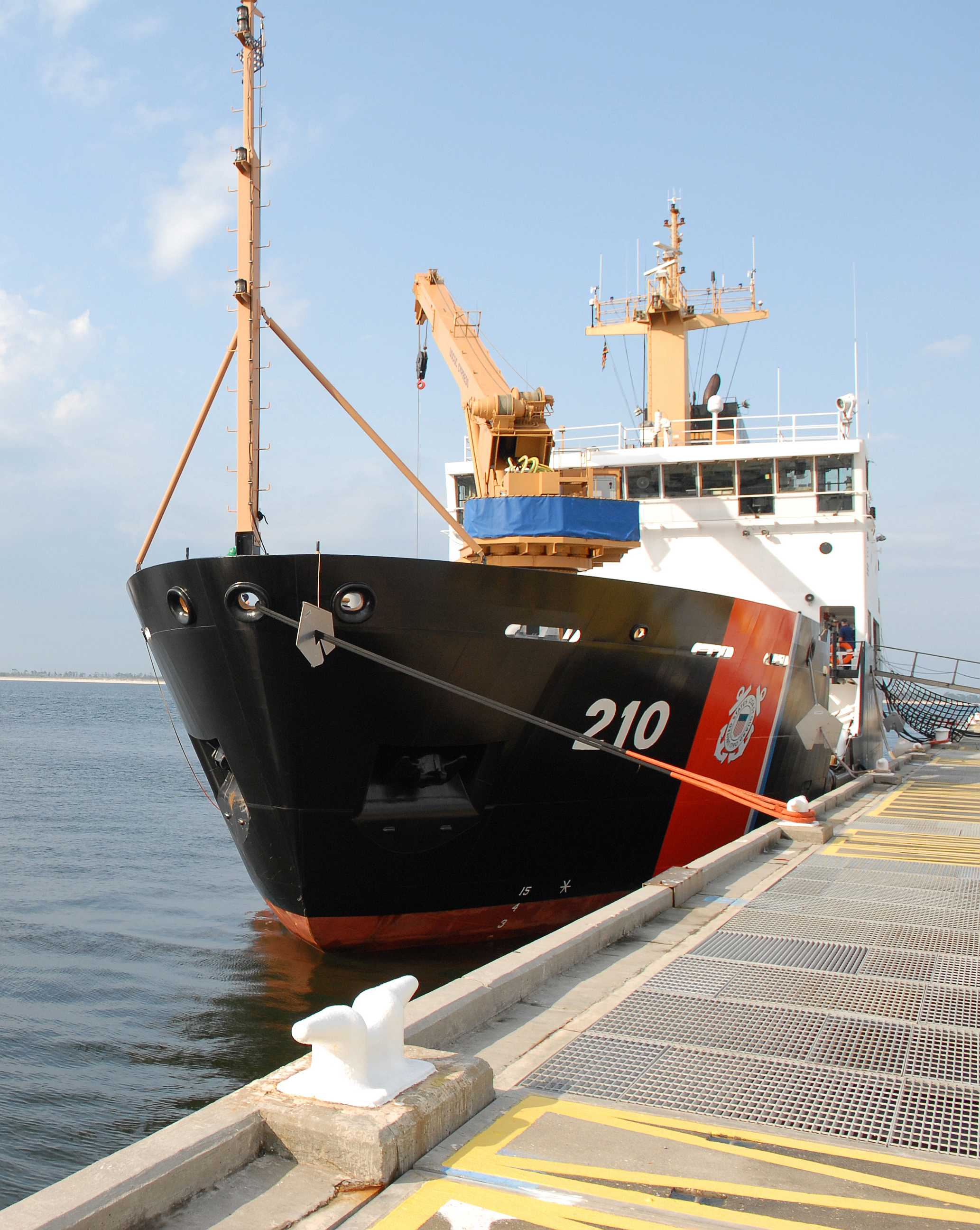
- USCGC Cypress at U.S. Naval Air Station Pensacola in 2010

History

United States
- Name: Cypress
- Launched: 27 October 2001
- Commissioned: 11 October 2002
- Home port: Kodiak, Alaska
- Identification: IMO number: 9259941; MMSI number: 368028000; Callsign: NCPI
- Status: in active service
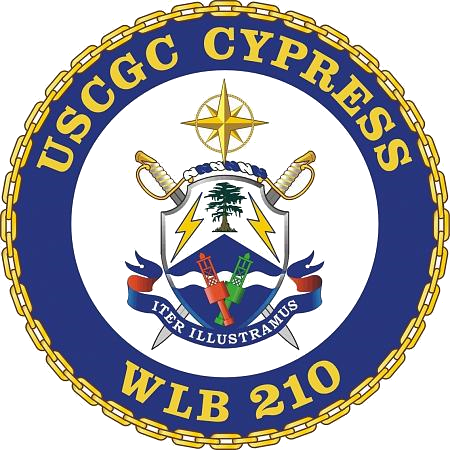
- Badge

General characteristics
- Displacement: 2,000 tons (full load)
- Length: 225 ft (69 m)
- Beam: 46 ft (14 m)
- Draft: 13 ft (4.0 m)
- Propulsion: Two 3,100 hp Caterpillar; diesel engines
- Speed: 16 knots
- Complement: 8 officers, 40 enlisted
- Armament: 2 x .50 caliber machine guns

USCGC Cypress (WLB-210) is a United States Coast Guard cutter and the tenth Juniper-class seagoing buoy tender. She is outfitted with advanced technological and navigational capabilities that allow her to be positioned correctly for exact placement of buoys through the use of controllable-pitch propellers and stern and bow thrusters.

== Etymology ==
The first USCGC Cypress was one of eight Manzanita-class buoy tenders constructed for the U.S. Lighthouse Service. The ship was commissioned on 21 July 1908, decommissioned 20 August 1946 and sold on 18 March 1947.

== History ==
=== 2000s ===
The advances made from the 180 ft (55 m) vintage seagoing buoytenders to the current Juniper-class are all-encompassing. The current Cypress is much larger at 225 ft (69 m) and 2000 tons, and was the first cutter to implement technological advances such as electronic charting, position keeping, and remote engineering monitoring and control. Cypress is also designed to skim and recover oil in the event of an oil spill. Cypress's Integrated Ship Control System has an Electronic Charting Display and Information System (ECDIS) which enables the fixing of her position to within five meters every second. Her Dynamic Positioning System (DPS) uses this positioning information, the ship's controllable-pitch propeller, and the stern and bow thrusters to keep the ship on station without any human input. Cypress's Machinery Plant Control and Monitoring System (MPCMS) has over 1000 sensors throughout the ship. This system makes it possible for one person in the engine room control center to monitor the ship's plant while underway.

Cypress' main area of operation stretches along 900 mi (1,400 km) of the Gulf Coast, from Apalachicola, Florida to the Mexican border at Brownsville, Texas, where she is responsible for the maintenance of 120 floating aids-to-navigation. She participated in hurricane recovery operations after Ivan, Katrina, and Rita, recovering and re-establishing buoys that were up to 24 nmi (44 km) off station, and re-establishing critical Gulf Coast channels including Pensacola, Florida, Mobile, Alabama, Gulfport and Pascagoula, Mississippi New Orleans, Louisiana Sabine and Corpus Christi, Texas.

In 2004, Cypress successfully recovered a sunken 38,000 lb (17,000 kg) "Blue Angels" F/A-18A Hornet from 40 ft (12 m) of water in the Gulf of Mexico, and has since served as the center point for the annual Blue Angels' air show at Pensacola Beach, Florida. In 2005, Cypress contributed to the re-build and extension of the Houston Ship Channel entrance, the portal to the busy Houston-Galveston area and used by more than 6,000 large vessels annually. In spring 2007, Cypress completed her first extended Alien Migration Interdiction Operations (AMIO) patrol for Coast Guard District Seven. During this patrol, she intercepted two go-fast smuggler vessels and seven suspected smugglers, as well as processing over 75 illegal migrants. In addition to routine and emergency servicing of approximately 120 federal aids-to- navigation, Cypress also assists the National Oceanic and Atmospheric Administration (NOAA) and the National Data Buoy Center (NDBC) by servicing approximately twenty weather buoys throughout the Gulf of Mexico, critical to assisting professional mariners with voyage planning as well as tracking and predicting hurricanes. Cypress has also operated in support of her secondary missions, engaging in Maritime Law Enforcement patrols and conducting search and rescue (SAR). In one recent SAR case, Cypress rescued 8 people from their recreational boat just minutes before it sank.

=== 2010s ===
Cypress responded to the Deepwater Horizon oil spill impacting the Gulf of Mexico, conducting oil recovery operations and support of the operational commander's goals.

From April to May 2012 Cypress underwent a drydock period at Tampa Shipbuilding Company. In 2012 and 2013, USCGC Cypress was a recipient of the Forrest O. Rednour Award for Medium Afloat "Galley of the Year."

In March 2019, USCGC Cypress collided with the Algiers Ferry dock at Woldenberg Park in New Orlean's French Quarter. The ship was carrying the Zulu king and queen to Lundi Gras festivities. Officials said that the ship's onboard computer system failed and propulsion kicked in, speeding her up and into the dock. Though the bow sustained damage, there were no reported injuries.

The Cypress is currently stationed in Kodiak, Alaska after arriving from the Coast Guard Yard in Baltimore, Maryland on Dec. 5, 2021.
