= Rednour =

Rednour may refer to:

- Forrest O. Rednour (1923-1943), a United States Coast Guardsman who received the Navy and Marine Corps Medal posthumously for his actions during World War II
- USS Rednour (DE-592), a United States Navy destroyer escort converted during construction into the high-speed transport USS Rednour (APD-102)
- USS Rednour (APD-102), a United States Navy high-speed transport in commission from 1944 to 1946
