= USCGC Forrest Rednour =

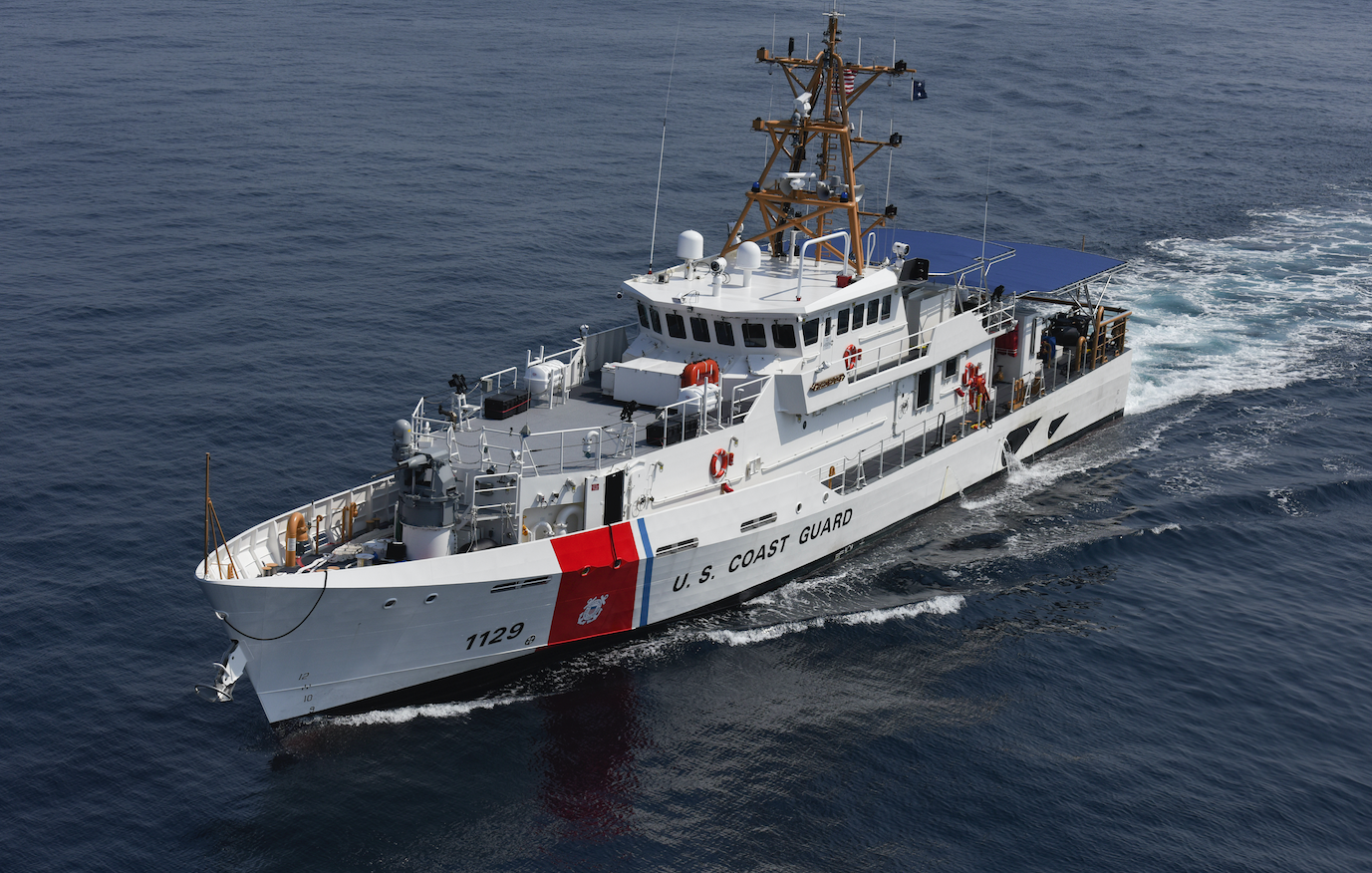

History

United States
- Name: Forrest Rednour
- Namesake: Forrest Oren Rednour
- Operator: United States Coast Guard
- Builder: Bollinger Shipyards, Lockport, Louisiana
- Launched: June 7, 2018
- Acquired: June 7, 2018
- Commissioned: November 8, 2018
- Home port: San Pedro, California
- Identification: MMSI number: 338926429; Callsign: NFRE; Hull number: WPC-1129
- Motto: Courage in the face of peril
- Status: in active service
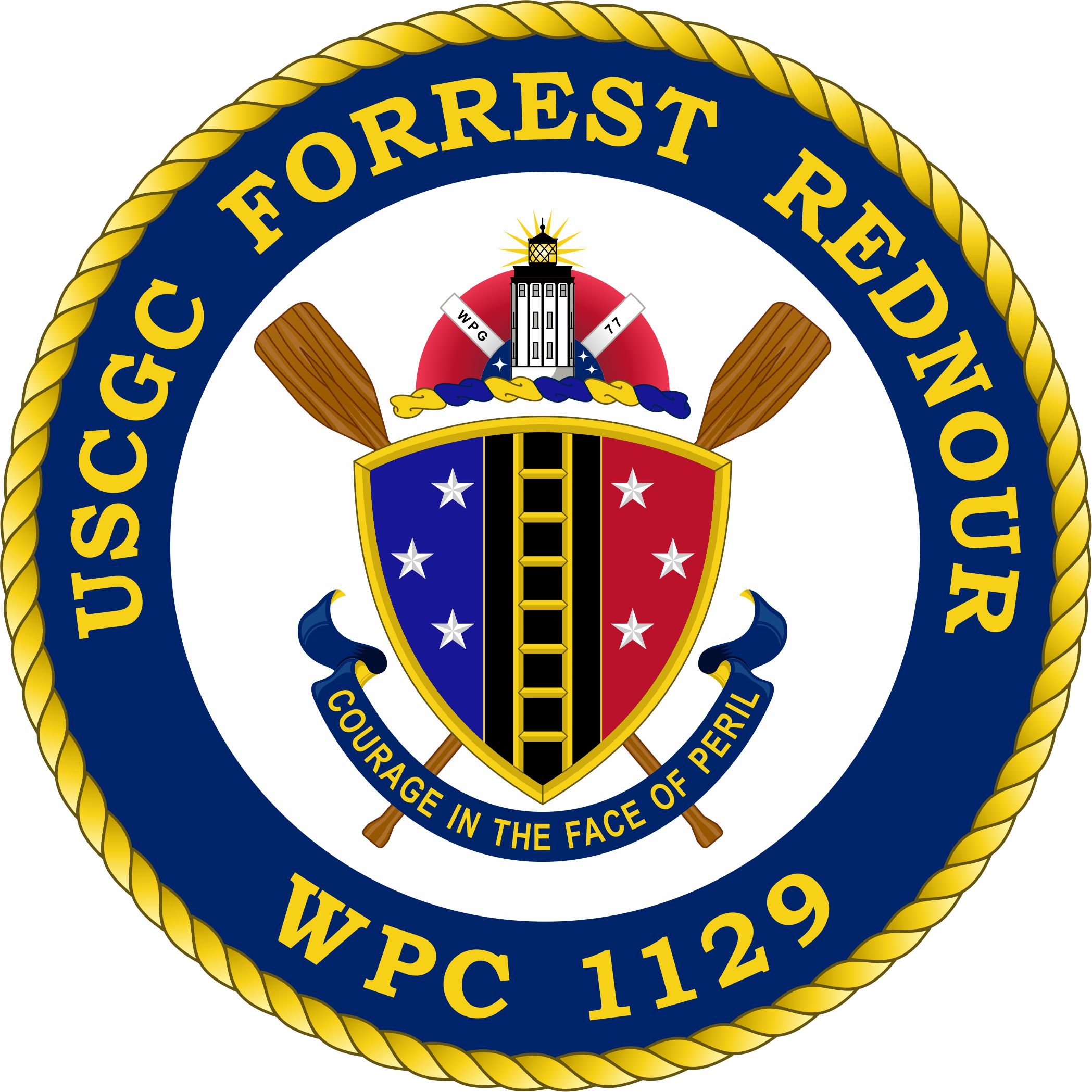
- Badge

General characteristics
- Class & type: Sentinel-class cutter
- Displacement: 353 long tons (359 t)
- Length: 46.8 m (154 ft)
- Beam: 8.11 m (26.6 ft)
- Depth: 2.9 m (9.5 ft)
- Propulsion: 2 × 4,300 kW (5,800 shp); 1 × 75 kW (101 shp) bow thruster
- Speed: 28 knots (52 km/h; 32 mph)
- Range: 2,500 nautical miles (4,600 km; 2,900 mi)
- Endurance: 5 days
- Boats & landing craft carried: 1 × Cutter Boat - Over the Horizon Interceptor
- Complement: 4 officers, 20 crew
- Sensors & processing systems: L-3 C4ISR suite
- Armament: 1 × Mk 38 Mod 2 25 mm automatic gun; 4 × crew-served Browning M2 machine guns

USCGC Forrest Rednour (WPC-1129) is the 29th Sentinel-class cutter built for the United States Coast Guard. She was the first of the four vessels of her class to be home-ported at USCG Base Los Angeles/Long Beach in San Pedro, California. Other sister ships have been based in Florida, Mississippi, Puerto Rico, New Jersey, North Carolina, Hawaii, and Alaska prior to Forrest Rednour's assignment to Base LA/LB. Sister ships Robert Ward (WPC-1130), Terrell Horne III (WPC-1131), and Benjamin Bottoms (WPC-1132) soon joined her at Base LA/LB.

== Design ==
Like her sister ships, Forrest Rednour is designed to perform search and rescue missions, port security, and the interception of smugglers. She is armed with a remotely-controlled, gyro-stabilized 25 mm autocannon, four crew served M2 Browning machine guns, and light arms. She is equipped with a stern launching ramp that allows her to launch or retrieve a water-jet propelled high-speed auxiliary boat without first coming to a stop. Her high-speed boat has over-the-horizon capability, and is useful for inspecting other vessels, and deploying boarding parties.

== Operational history ==
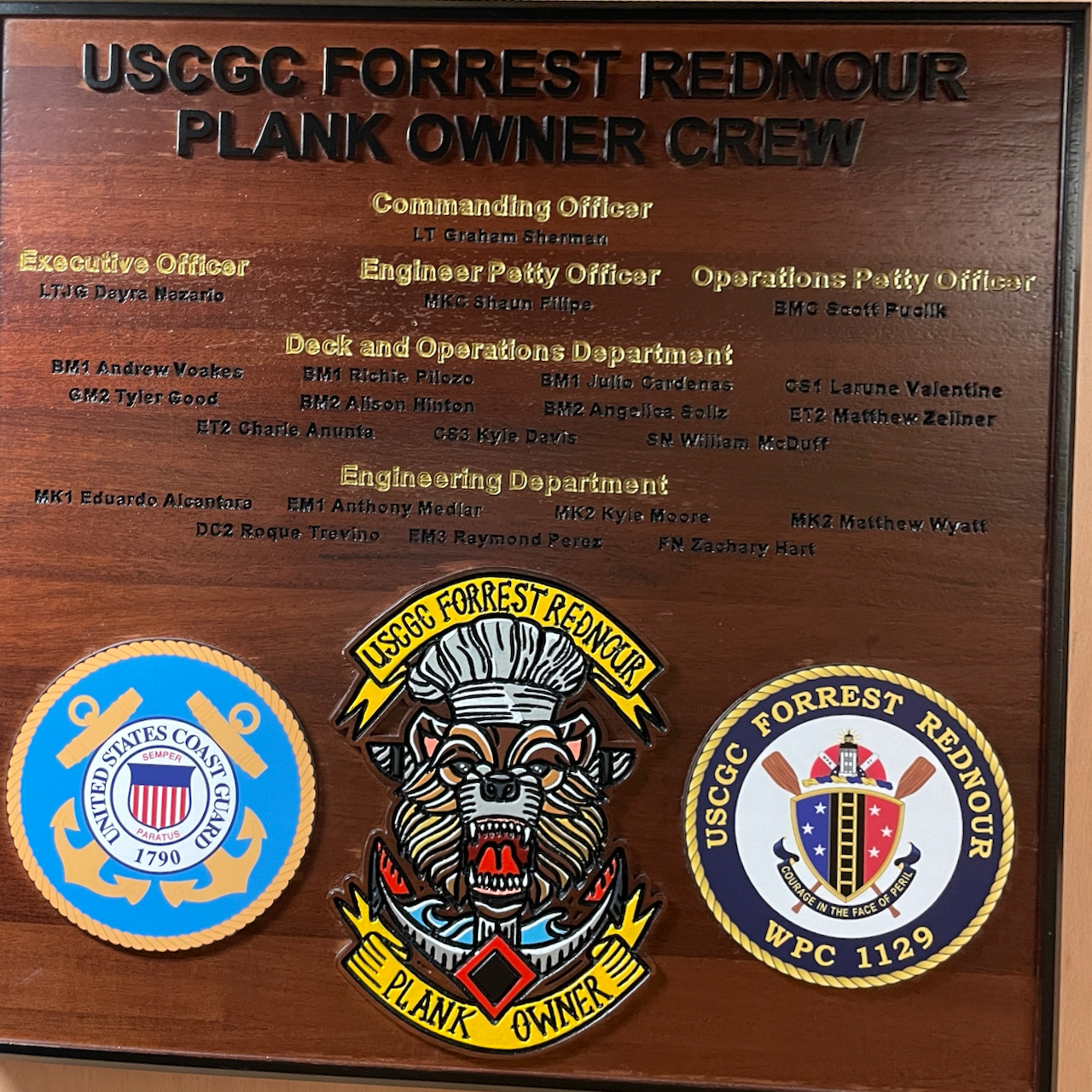
The commissioning crew of USCGC Forrest Rednour

Forrest Rednour arrived in Los Angeles on August 13, 2018, and was commissioned at Base LA/LB on November 8, 2018 with LT Graham Sherman serving as her first commanding officer. Executive officer LTJG Dayra Nazario and 20 enlisted crew members also serve as Forrest Rednour's plankowners.

On her first mission, Rednour apprehended 3 people aboard a 25-foot cuddy cabin boat with 1,000 pounds of marijuana on board, approximately 30 miles south of the US-Mexico maritime border just before midnight on November 27, 2018.

On August 8, 2020, Rednour hailed and approached a suspected smuggler off the coast of San Diego. The smuggler turned their panga towards Rednour's boarding crew, ramming the cutter boat, much like the incident which killed BMSC Terrell Horne in 2012. A high speed chase ensued in which U.S. Customs and Border Protection Air & Marine Operations agents intercepted, shooting the motor of the vessel and forcing the panga to a stop 12 nautical miles west of Oceanside, CA. The combined task force recovered 500 pounds of methamphetamine and arrested the smugglers, the captain eventually earning 194 months in a federal penitentiary on 15 felony charges.

Forrest Rednour returned home after a 32 day patrol of international waters off the coast of Mexico in September 2021, seizing more than 5,000 pounds of cocaine with a street value of $96 million. During the course of the mission, they also met with the similarly classed ARM Monte Albán (PC 338) of the Mexican Navy, patrolling the same waters.

15 undocumented immigrants were intercepted off the coast of Orange County, CA by Forrest Rednour on April 20, 2023. The Rednour spotted an overloaded 36-ft sportfisher with an estimated 8-12 people aboard near San Clemente and coordinated with CBP Air and Marine Operations to apprehend and seize the vessel.

== Namesake ==
FS2 Forrest Oren Rednour (1923–1943) received the Navy and Marine Corps Medal posthumously "For heroic conduct while aboard USCGC Escanaba during the rescue of survivors from the torpedoed USAT Dorchester in North Atlantic waters on 3 February 1943...Rednour’s gallant and voluntary action in subjecting himself to pounding seas and bitter cold for nearly four hours contributed to the rescue of 145 persons".

One of only two Coast Guardsmen honored by the naming of a U.S. Navy ship, Forrest Rednour was announced as the namesake of the U.S. Coast Guard's 29th fast response cutter in 2018. All 58 cutters in the Sentinel class are to be named after enlisted sailors in the Coast Guard who were recognized for their heroism.

Forrest previously served as the namesake of the U.S. Navy high-speed transport USS Rednour (APD-102).
