= Thomas Cramen =

American sailor (1848–1915)

- Born: 1848; Ireland
- Died: March 5, 1915; Brooklyn, New York, U.S.
- Military career
- Allegiance: United States of America
- Branch: United States Navy
- Rank: Boatswain's Mate
- Unit: USS Portsmouth
- Awards: Medal of Honor

Thomas Cramen (1848 – March 5, 1915) was a United States Navy sailor and a recipient of the United States military's highest decoration, the Medal of Honor.

== Biography ==
Born in 1848 in Ireland, Cremen immigrated to the United States and joined the Navy from Massachusetts. By February 7, 1882, he was serving as a boatswain's mate on the training ship USS Portsmouth. On that day, while Portsmouth was at the Washington Navy Yard, he and another sailor, Seaman Henry C. Courtney, jumped overboard and rescued Jack-of-the-Dust Charles Taliaferro from drowning. For this action, both Cremen and Courtney were awarded the Medal of Honor two and a half years later, on October 18, 1884.

Cremen's official Medal of Honor citation reads:

On board the U.S.S. Portsmouth, Washington Navy Yard, 7 February 1882. Jumping overboard from that vessel, Cramen rescued Charles Taliaferro, jack-of-the-dust, from drowning.

== See also ==
- List of Medal of Honor recipients during peacetime
