= Henry C. Courtney =

American sailor (1856–1887)

- Navy Medal of Honor
- Born: 1856; Springfield, Illinois, US
- Died: April 9, 1887 (aged 30–31); Brooklyn, New York, US
- Burial place: Cypress Hills National Cemetery
- Military career
- Allegiance: United States of America
- Branch: United States Navy
- Service years: 1873 - 1886
- Rank: Seaman
- Unit: USS Portsmouth
- Awards: Medal of Honor

Henry C. Courtney (1856 – April 9, 1887) was a United States Navy sailor and a recipient of the United States military's highest decoration, the Medal of Honor.

== Biography ==
Born in 1856 in Springfield, Illinois, Courtney joined the Navy from that state in 1873. By February 7, 1882, he was serving as a seaman on the training ship USS Portsmouth. On that day, while Portsmouth was at the Washington Navy Yard, Courtney and another sailor, Boatswain's Mate Thomas Cramen, jumped overboard and rescued Jack-of-the-Dust Charles Taliaferro from drowning. For this action, both Courtney and Cramen were awarded the Medal of Honor two and a half years later, on October 18, 1884. He left the Navy in 1886.

Courtney's official Medal of Honor citation reads:

On board the U.S. Training Ship Portsmouth, Washington Navy Yard, 7 February 1882. Jumping overboard from that vessel, Courtney assisted in rescuing Charles Taliaferro, jack-of-the-dust, from drowning.

== See also ==
- List of Medal of Honor recipients during peacetime
