= Alexander Parker (Medal of Honor) =

- Born: August 1832; Kensington, New Jersey, U.S.
- Died: October 2, 1900 (aged 68); Vallejo, California, U.S.
- Burial place: Mare Island Cemetery, Vallejo, California, US
- Military career
- Allegiance: United States of America
- Branch: United States Navy
- Rank: Boatswain's Mate
- Unit: USS Portsmouth
- Awards: Medal of Honor

Alexander Parker (August 1832 – October 2, 1900) was a United States Navy sailor and a recipient of the United States military's highest decoration, the Medal of Honor.

Born in August 1832 in Kensington, New Jersey, Parker joined the Navy from that state. By July 25, 1876, he was serving as a boatswain's mate on the USS Portsmouth. On that day, at Mare Island Naval Shipyard in California, he attempted to save a shipmate seaman named George Fordham from drowning. For this action, he was awarded the Medal of Honor two weeks later, on August 9.

Parker's official Medal of Honor citation reads:

For gallant conduct in attempting to save a shipmate from drowning at the Navy Yard, Mare Island, Calif., on 25 July 1876.

Parker left the Navy while still a boatswain's mate. He died on October 2, 1900, at age 68.

== See also ==
- List of Medal of Honor recipients during peacetime
