= Francis Moore (Medal of Honor) =

American sailor (1858–??)

- Born: 1858; New York City, US
- Died: Unknown
- Military career
- Allegiance: United States of America
- Branch: United States Navy
- Rank: Boatswain's Mate
- Unit: USS Portsmouth
- Awards: Medal of Honor

Francis Moore (born 1858, date of death unknown) was a United States Navy sailor and a recipient of the United States military's highest decoration, the Medal of Honor.

== Biography ==
Born in 1858 in New York County, Moore joined the Navy from that state. By January 23, 1882, he was serving as a boatswain's mate on the training ship USS Portsmouth. On that day, while Portsmouth was at the Washington Navy Yard, Moore jumped overboard in an attempt to rescue carpenter and caulker, Thomas Duncan, who had fallen overboard, from drowning. For this action, he was awarded the Medal of Honor three years later, on October 18, 1884.

Moore's official Medal of Honor citation reads:

For jumping overboard from the U.S. Training Ship Portsmouth, at the Washington Navy Yard, 23 January 1882, and endeavoring to rescue Thomas Duncan, carpenter and calker, who had fallen overboard.

== See also ==
- List of Medal of Honor recipients during peacetime
