= Provisioning of USS Constitution =

Provisioning for sea was crucial in the 19th century due to the lack of modern conveniences such as refrigeration, freeze-drying and canning. Most foodstuffs and liquids such as spirits, molasses, vinegar, and water, were shipped in casks, the balance in wooden crates and other suitable packing materials.

It was also commonplace to carry live chickens, both for their eggs and meat, and some small livestock such as sheep, which were butchered when their feed ran out, providing fresh meat before barreled stores such as beef and salt pork were consumed.

The fare for officers and rations for the crew were distinct, as were dining accommodations, with each reflecting their relative stations in society and the navy.

Due to the inability to maintain water fresh for extended periods of time prior to the advent of modern hygiene, shipboard plumbing, and disinfectants, it was common to ship large quantities of beer to provide both hydration and nourishment in times when water aboard fouled. The beer's alcoholic content served as a preservative.

In contrast, grog, a mix of rum and water, was provided and consumed daily (with officers provided their rum straight). The rum allotment per man was retained in the United States Navy until the latter part of the 19th century, and all the way until 1970 in the British Royal Navy.

== USS Constitution ==
Ordered on a cruise intended to last at least six months, USS Constitution sailed on 30 December 1813, with 485 men provisioned as follows:

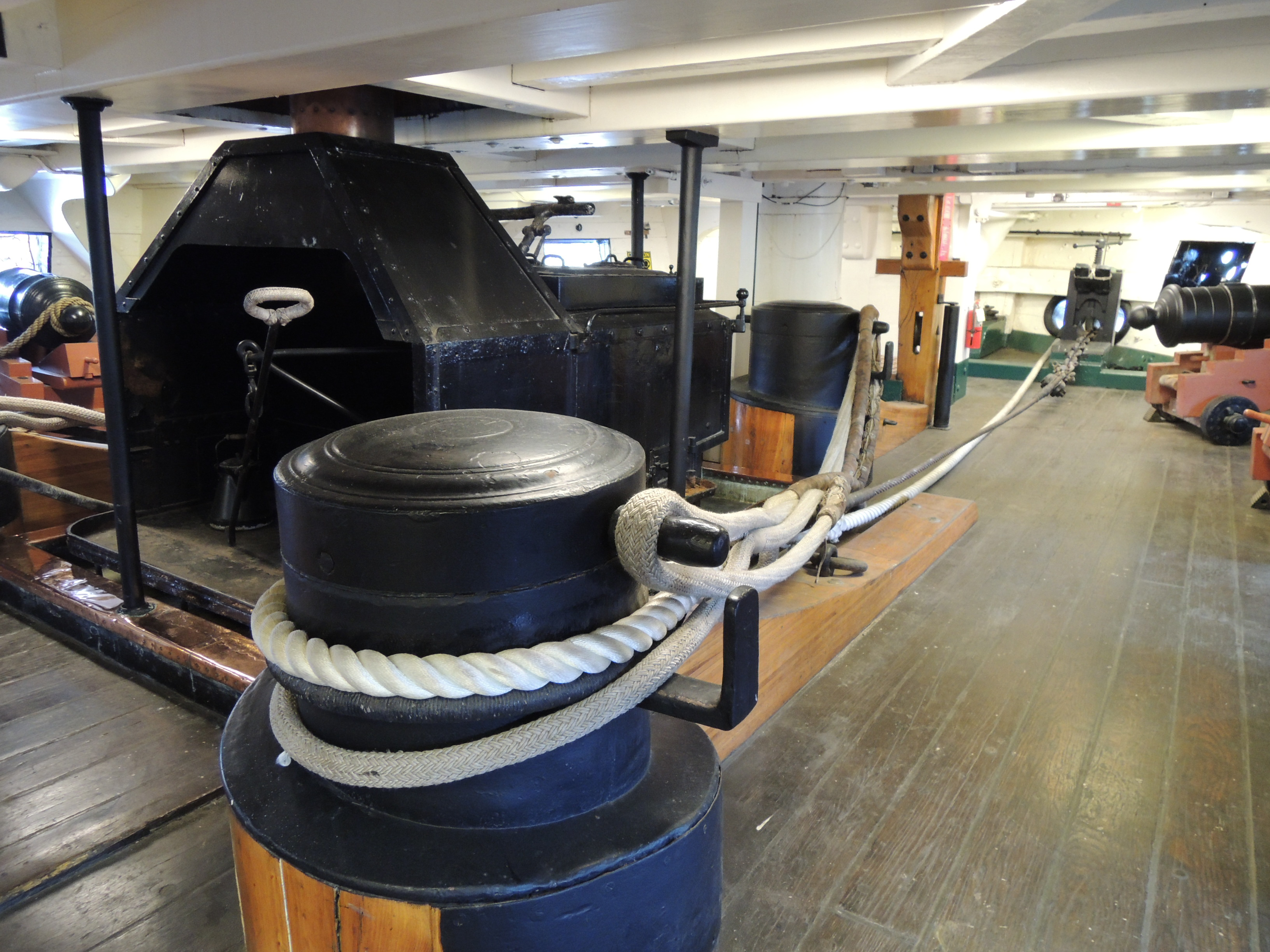
Galley area of USS Constitution

Quantity
ITEM	REQUESTED	ACQUIRED
bread	84,456 pounds (38,309 kg)	76,234 pounds (34,579 kg)
beef	57,700 pounds (26,200 kg)	51,969 pounds (23,573 kg)
pork	50,600 pounds (23,000 kg)	39,840 pounds (18,070 kg)
flour	12,544 pounds (5,690 kg)	12,544 pounds (5,690 kg)
cheese	2,174 pounds (986 kg)	2,174 pounds (986 kg)
butter	1,765.5 pounds (800.8 kg)	1,765.5 pounds (800.8 kg)
raisins	360 pounds (160 kg)	360 pounds (160 kg)
peas/beans	1,286.4 US gallons (4,870 L)	1,286.4 US gallons (4,870 L)
rice	1,657 US gallons (6,270 L)	1,316.9 US gallons (4,985 L)
molasses	870 US gallons (3,300 L)	870 US gallons (3,300 L)
vinegar	870 US gallons (3,300 L)	796.6 US gallons (3,015 L)
crout [sic]	800 US gallons (3,000 L)	800 US gallons (3,000 L)
spirits	9,546 US gallons (36,140 L)	5,074.7 US gallons (19,210 L)
water		47,265 US gallons (178,920 L)

"Beef was stowed on the larboard side and pork to starboard; flour, rice, and peas/beans in the wings. Stowage, as with the water casks below them, is begun from aft and worked forward. Casks in the spirit room are stowed from the forward bulkhead aft. In all cases, the largest containers are closest to the keelson, with sizes diminishing as they are laid outboard. All casks are laid bung up."

Foodstuffs may well be in the hold for months, perhaps years. Two hundred years ago life ashore was tough and life at sea had the advantage that at least you would get three meals a day, however grim they may have been.

"Cooks in the early Navy were left to their own imaginations when it came to preparing meals. In the main, this resulted in whatever was on the official ration for that day of the week being tossed in a ship's coppers and boiled until meal time. The first official Navy cook book was produced by Paymaster F. T. Arms and published by the Bureau of Supplies and Accounts in 1902. It contained five recipes for soup, six for fish, thirty-four for meats, fowl, and eggs, and several for desserts, including "plum duff"."

== 1803 Comparison ==
On 18 June 1803, Purser James Deblois reported to Commodore Edward Preble that the following provisions would be required for a 400 man crew for a now unknown six months cruise:

Quantity requested
bread	20,000 pounds (9,100 kg)
beef	36,000 pounds (16,000 kg)
pork	31,200 pounds (14,200 kg)
flour	10,400 pounds (4,700 kg)
suet	5,200 pounds (2,400 kg)
cheese	3,900 pounds (1,800 kg)
butter	1,300 pounds (590 kg)
peas/beans	1,500 US gallons (5,700 L)
rice	1,300 US gallons (4,900 L)
molasses	650 US gallons (2,500 L)
vinegar	650 US gallons (2,500 L)
wax candles	500 pounds (230 kg)
tallow candles	500 pounds (230 kg)

== See also ==
- Galley (kitchen)
- Jack of the dust
- Purser
- Steward's department
