= Culinary specialist (United States Navy) =

United States Navy occupational rating

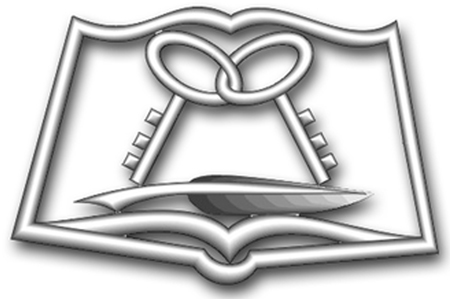
- Navy (lt) and Coast Guard (rt) Rating insignia
- Issued by: United States Navy; United States Coast Guard
- Type: Enlisted rating
- Abbreviation: CS

Culinary Specialist (abbreviated CS) is a United States Navy and United States Coast Guard occupational rating. The Navy rating was created on January 15, 2004, from the Mess Management Specialist (MS) rating.

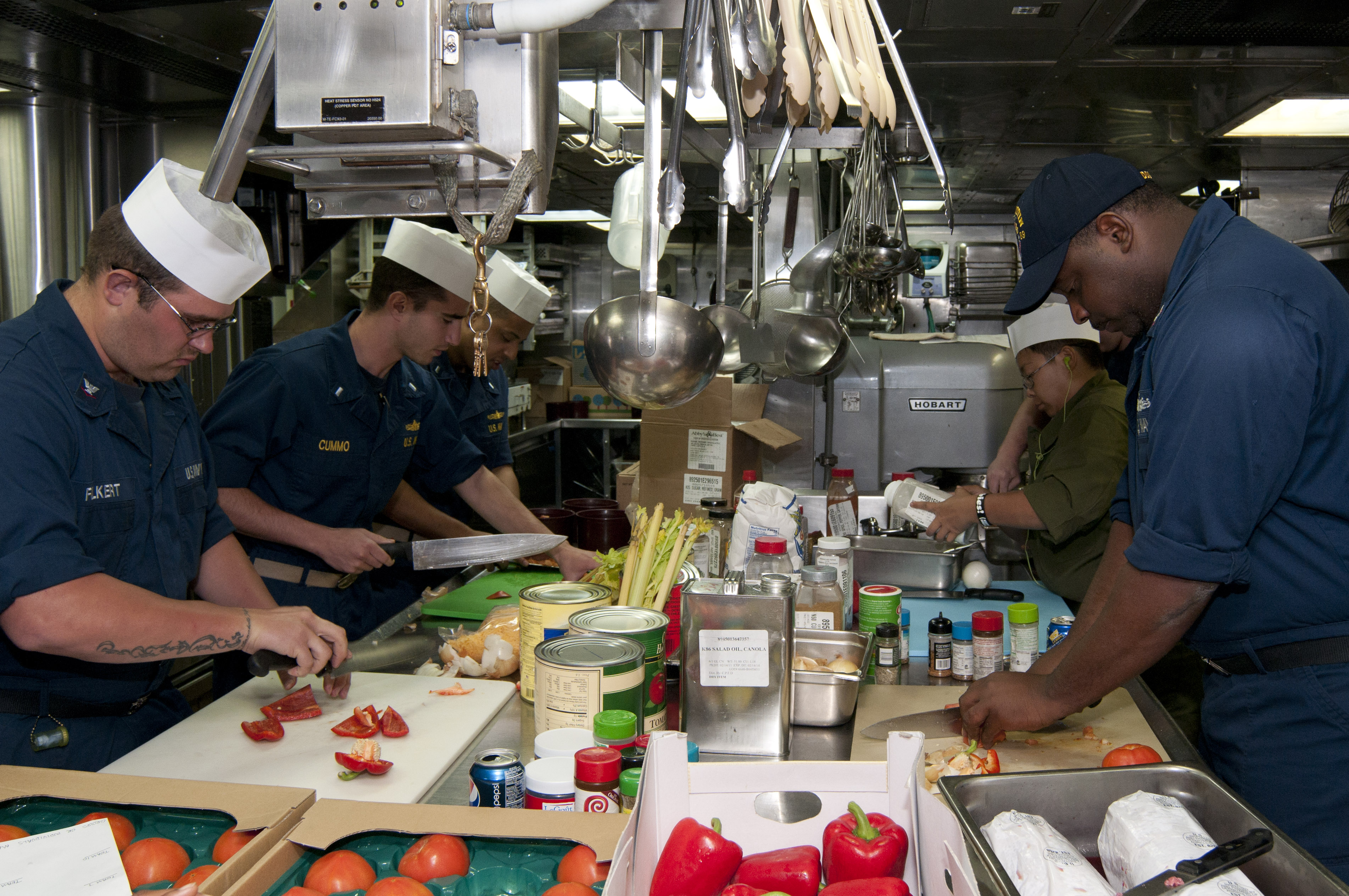
Culinary specialists prepare a meal aboard USS Mustin

The U.S. Coast Guard replaced its previously named Food Service Specialist (FS) rating with Culinary Specialist on January 6, 2017, in order to "accurately reflect the culinary skills and professional expertise held by members of the rating".

== History ==
Cooks have been a part of the Navy since its founding with the Naval Act of 1794, which stipulated the crew and rates required for each ship. It was changed to Ship's Cook in 1838, and by 1948 had expanded to Ship's Cook, Butcher, and Baker, all of which were consolidated into Commissaryman (CS).

Food service ratings in the U.S. Navy remained divided into two broad groupings until the merger of Commissaryman (CS) and Steward (SD) ratings to Mess Management Specialist (MS) on January 1, 1975. Before 1975, stewards prepared and served meals to the officers, maintained their quarters and took care of their uniforms. They served officers in the flag mess for admirals, the cabin mess for the ship's captain and the wardroom mess for all other officers.

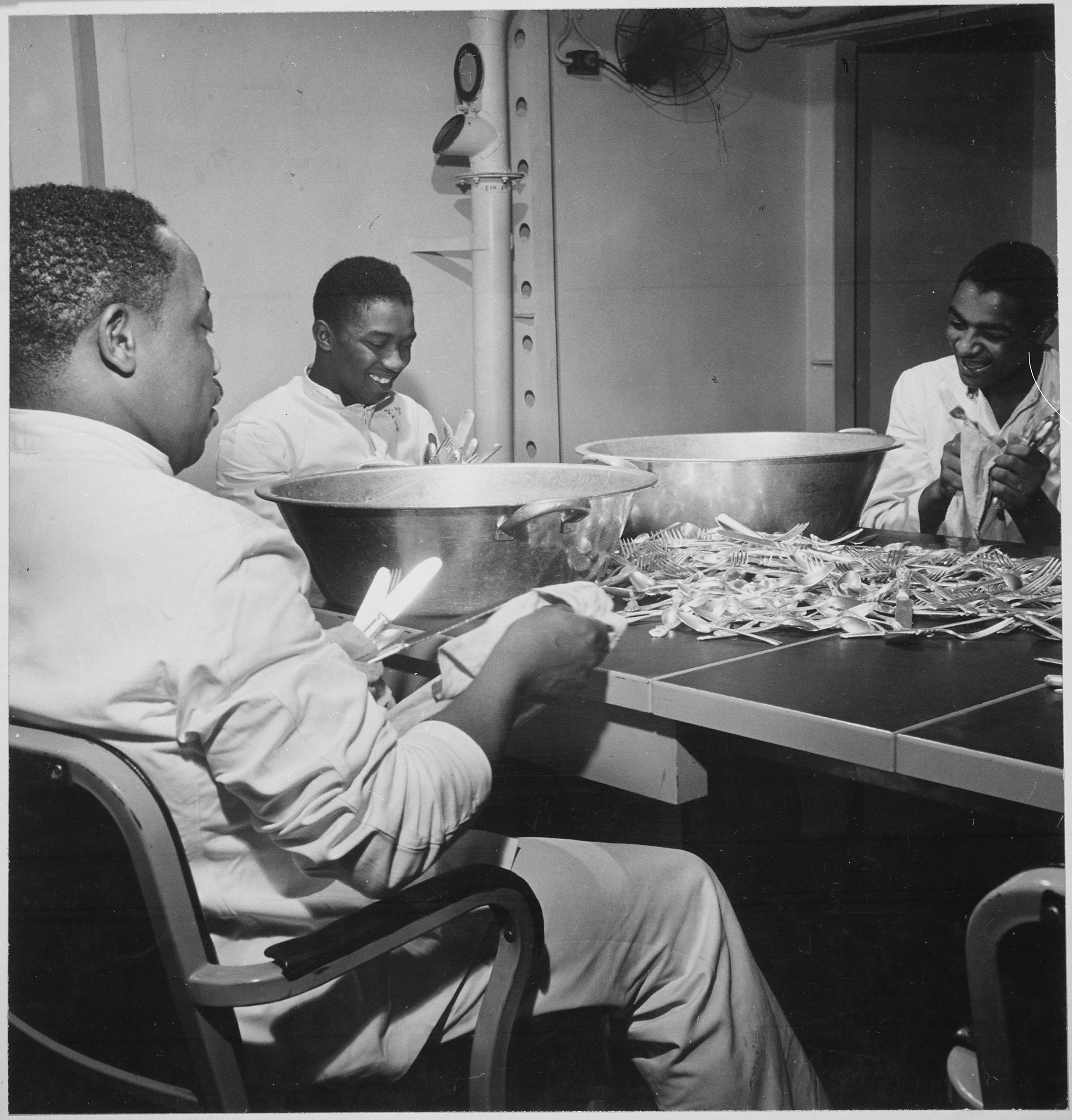
Wardroom stewards polish silver aboard USS Ticonderoga

Until the merger, the steward rating, and its predecessor ratings were largely segregated. While the Navy was integrated in the Civil War, pressure from Southern states during the Jim Crow era led to increasing segregation with African-American sailors limited to menial labor. Following WWI African-Americans were completely prohibited from enlisting, and Filipinos were recruited to fill the Steward and Mess Attendant rates, then seen as little more than domestic servants. The run-up to WWII saw a return of African-Americans to meet recruitment needs, again limited to the Steward and Mess Attendant rates, freeing up unrestricted sailors to fill operational, tactical and combat roles. Commissarymen were known as non-rated Mess Attendants and Petty Officer Ships Cooks (SC), deadend jobs which ostensibly topped off at Petty Officer 1st Class, but rarely achieved.

Commissarymen prepared meals for enlisted sailors in galleys on the ship and shore bases in the general mess. They purchased food from approved sources, stored food stuffs and distributed to the galleys for preparation and kept accountability records.

With the consolidation, sailors in the new rating became "responsible for food preparation and food service for both enlisted and officer messes." To accommodate the change, officers were now required to assume some of the upkeep of their staterooms and personal uniforms. Other cleaning duties became the responsibility of rotational pool of enlisted personnel from the ship. This arrangement continues with the current culinary specialist rating. Nonrated enlisted personnel in pay grades E-1 to E-3 are usually required to assist in galley duty, much as those in the Army are assigned to KP duty. Technically called Food Service Attendants (formerly Mess Cooks), this practice is somewhat derisively referred to as "cranking".

In an effort to make Mess Management Specialist (MS) translate to the civilian sector, the rating title was updated to Culinary Specialist (CS) in 2004. This change allowed for easier recruiting tactics when giving job descriptions related to various civilian jobs with similar titles. It also provided sailors transitioning into the civilian sector an opportunity to use their culinary certifications that would now correlate into numerous career paths, including food production methods, cost control, nutrition, sanitation, and food marketing. The Culinary Specialist rating in the Navy now belongs to approximately 7,500 food service personnel who feed over 300,000 US Navy sailors worldwide.

In the U.S. Coast Guard, its Comissaryman and Steward ratings were merged in 1973 into the Subsistence Specialist (SS) rating. The Subsistence Specialist designation was then changed to Food Service Specialist (FS) in 1996, to better describe the duties as opposed to the connotation of subsistence with bare survival.

Culinary specialists at work

The Army equivalent to the CS was also renamed from Food Service Specialist to Culinary Specialist (92G) in 2015, standardizing training for post-service transition into the private sector, and for seamless combined billeting in joint messes.

Today, Navy sailors who are accepted to attend A-School in CS train at the Joint Culinary Center of Excellence together with Army, Air Force, and Marines at Fort Lee, Virginia. Coast Guard still operates its own culinary A-School.

== Duties ==
Culinary specialists operate and manage U.S. Navy and U.S. Coast Guard messes and living quarters in addition to many other duties as follows:

- Estimate quantities and kinds of foodstuffs required.
- Assist supply officers in ordering and storage of subsistence items and procurement of equipment and mess gear.
- Check delivery for quantity and assist medical personnel in inspection for quality.
- Prepare menus and plan, prepare, and serve meals.
- Maintain food service spaces and associated equipment in a clean and sanitary condition, including storerooms and refrigerated spaces.
- Maintain records of financial transactions and submit required reports.
- Maintain, oversee, and manage quarters afloat and ashore.

Navy and Coast Guard culinary specialists also staff the White House Mess and at Camp David, working under a civilian Executive Chef.

Navy and Coast Guard Culinary Specialists annually compete with military chefs from other services at the Joint Culinary Training Exercise, now in its 50th year. The exercise, administered by the American Culinary Federation, recognizes military chefs in over 2 dozen categories, including individual and team awards for pastry, hot food, cold food, and in operational and ceremonial conditions. Additionally, reality TV shows have featured various episodes with military chefs, often tied to competitions between ships in port for a Fleet Week, and Chopped devoted a season to military chefs in 2023.

== Notable culinary specialists ==
- Robert Blake, Civil War Navy steward and first black U.S. Navy recipient of the Medal of Honor
- Carl Brashear, Navy steward's mate and first African-American accepted to the Navy Diving & Salvage School and earn Master Diver Qualification
- Charles Walter David Jr., WW2 Coast Guard steward's mate and namesake of the 7th USCG Sentinel-class cutter
- George W. Gibbs Jr., first African-American to set foot on Antarctica as cook aboard Richard E. Byrd's third Antarctic expedition
- Alex Haley, WW2 Coast Guard mess attendant best known as the author of Roots: The Saga of an American Family
- Carl Kimmons, the first Navy mess attendant to rise up to commissioned officer
- Doris Miller, WW2 Navy cook & first Black recipient of the Navy Cross
- Walt Nauta, valet to Donald Trump
- Forrest O. Rednour, WW2 Coast Guard cook. Namesake of 2 ships & Coast Guard's Excellence in Food Service Award
- Dominique Saavedra, first female enlisted Navy sailor to earn a submarine qualification
- John Henry Turpin, Navy mess attendant who became one of the first Black Chief Petty Officers

Other notable military chefs:

- Eric G. Gibson, T/5 Company Cook in WWII who led a squad to attack enemy positions and was posthumously awarded the Medal of Honor
- Robert Irvine, Royal Navy catering services petty officer who has gone on to become a celebrity chef and named an honorary CPO by the U.S. Navy
- Andre Rush, Army food service specialist who worked as a member of the White House Mess under 4 presidents, and has since become a celebrity chef

== See also ==
- Chief cook
- Jack of the dust
- Steward's assistant
- United States Army Quartermaster Corps
- List of United States Navy ratings
- List of United States Coast Guard ratings
