= USS Portsmouth (1843) =

Gunboat of the United States Navy

Coordinates: 43.0788°N 70.7405°W

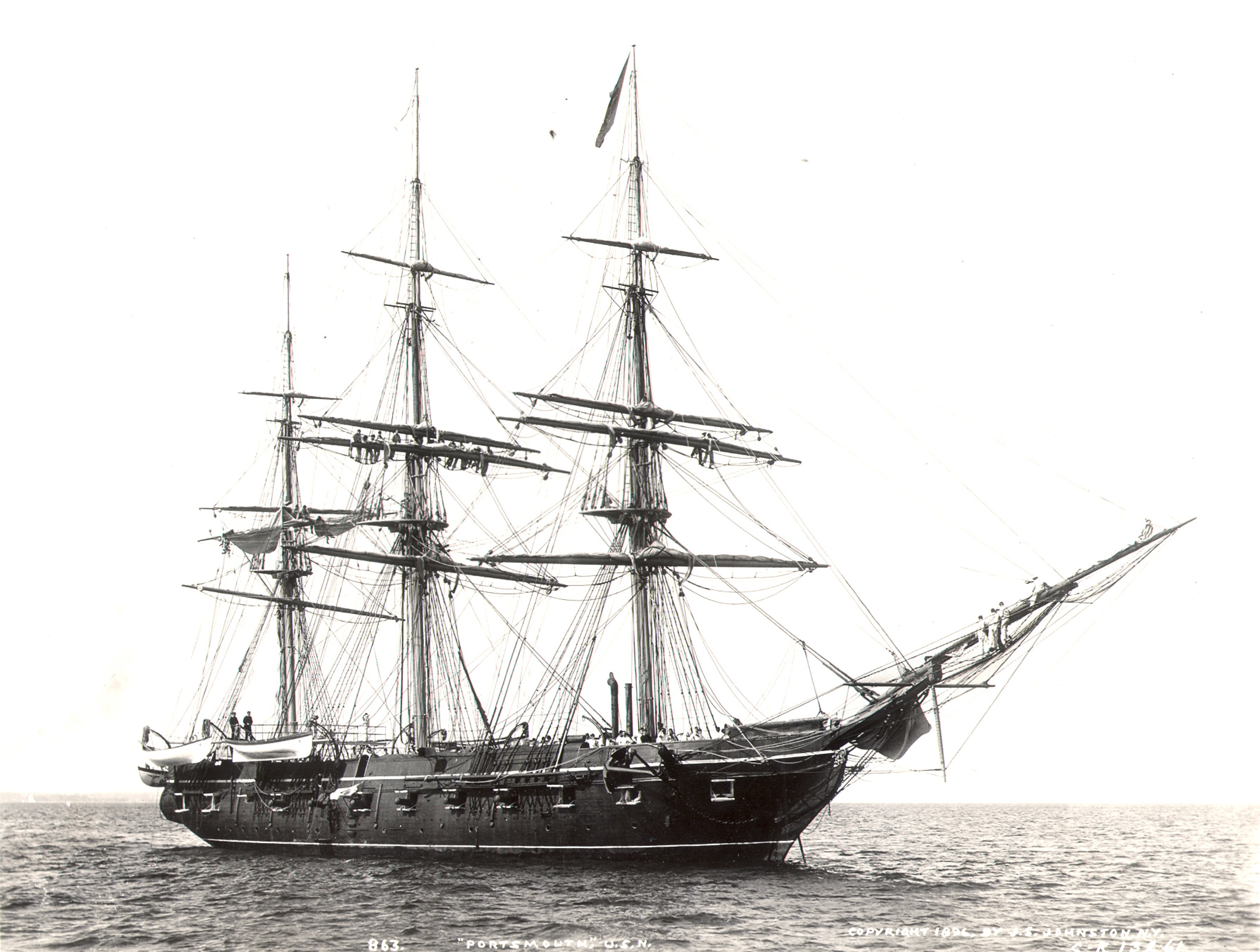
- USS Portsmouth in 1896 (John S. Johnston, photographer)

History

United States
- Name: USS Portsmouth
- Builder: Portsmouth Navy Yard, its namesake navy yard
- Launched: 23 October 1843
- Commissioned: 10 November 1844
- Decommissioned: 14 July 1878
- Stricken: 17 April 1915
- Fate: Sold, and destroyed, 6–7 September 1915

General characteristics
- Type: Sloop-of-war
- Tonnage: 1,022
- Length: 151 ft 10 in (46.28 m)
- Beam: 37 ft 3 in (11.35 m)
- Draft: 16 ft 6 in (5.03 m)
- Propulsion: Sail
- Complement: 200 Naval officers and enlisted, 27 Marines
- Armament: 18 × medium 32-pounder guns; 2 × Paixhans 64-pounder shell guns

The second USS Portsmouth was a wooden sloop-of-war in the United States Navy in service during the mid-to-late 19th century. She was designed by Josiah Barker on the lines of a French-built privateer, and built at the Portsmouth Navy Yard, directly across the Piscataqua River from Portsmouth, New Hampshire. She was described as an improvement over USS Saratoga built in the same shipyard a year earlier. Portsmouth was launched on 23 October 1843 and commissioned on 10 November 1844, with Commander John Berrien Montgomery in command.

== Service history ==
=== Mexican–American War, 1845–1848 ===
Portsmouth had an important role during the Mexican–American War, seizing the port of Yerba Buena (today's San Francisco) from Mexico. She had set sail on 25 January 1845 from Norfolk, Virginia, on a cruise around Cape Horn to join the Pacific Squadron under the command of Commodore John D. Sloat. En route, she made stops in Rio de Janeiro, Valparaíso, Callao, the Sandwich Islands, and Acapulco. Upon arriving off the Departamento de Las Californias coast, with Lieutenant Benjamin F. B. Hunter as her Sailing Master, she was initially engaged in observing the movements of British vessels there as part of American efforts to prevent the possibility of Britain acquiring the region in the event of a war between the U.S. and Mexico.

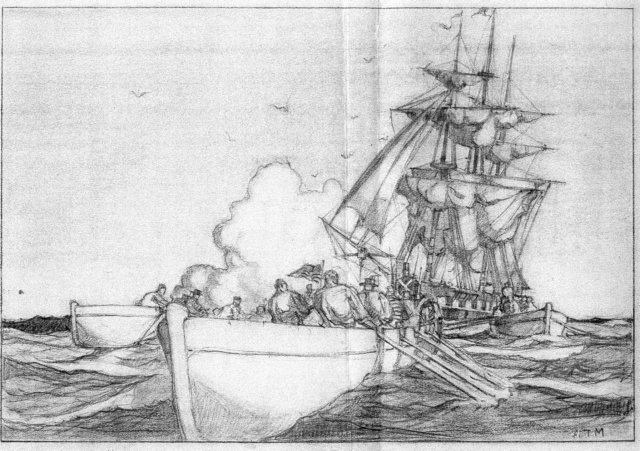
Marines of USS Portsmouth proceeding ashore on 9 July 1846 to hoist the American flag at Yerba Buena, today's San Francisco

After the declaration of war with Mexico, a detachment of Marines under the command of Second Lieutenant Henry Bulls Watson rowed ashore on 9 July 1846, marched to the pueblo's main plaza, and raised the American flag, thereby seizing the city. Renamed Portsmouth Square, the site is located in modern Chinatown. In the square there is a US Flag flown from a flagpole and a commemorative plaque set by the Daughters of the American Revolution.

Portsmouth remained in San Francisco Bay until November 1846, when she was sent to San Diego. During 1847, under the command of Montgomery, she was assigned to blockade Mexico's west coast, arriving with USS Congress and USS Argo at Guaymas on 17 October. After a request to surrender was rejected the ships began a bombardment of the city, lasting an hour. After the town surrendered a garrison was sent ashore and occupied the city. Her duty completed by early 1848, she got underway for the cruise back to the U.S. east coast on the morning of 3 January.

=== West Africa, 1848–1851 ===
Returning to Boston in May 1848 she departed again on 29 August and sailed east to the African coast. There until 1 February 1849 she patrolled with Royal Navy ships to suppress the slave trade. Between September 1849 and May 1851 she again cruised off the West African coast, returning to Boston on 26 June.

=== Pacific, Africa, 1851–1861 ===
Six months later Portsmouth left Boston for duty in the Pacific. On 5 April 1855 she returned to the east coast for overhaul at Norfolk, and on 3 May 1856 got underway for the Pacific again. Under Commander Andrew H. Foote she reached Batavia 94 days later, whence she sailed to China. There she participated in the engagement with the Barrier Forts of Canton on 16–22 November 1856. Ordered home in January 1858, she returned to Portsmouth, New Hampshire, and remained there until sailing for Africa again for a three-year tour, 1859–1861.

=== Civil War, 1861–1865 ===
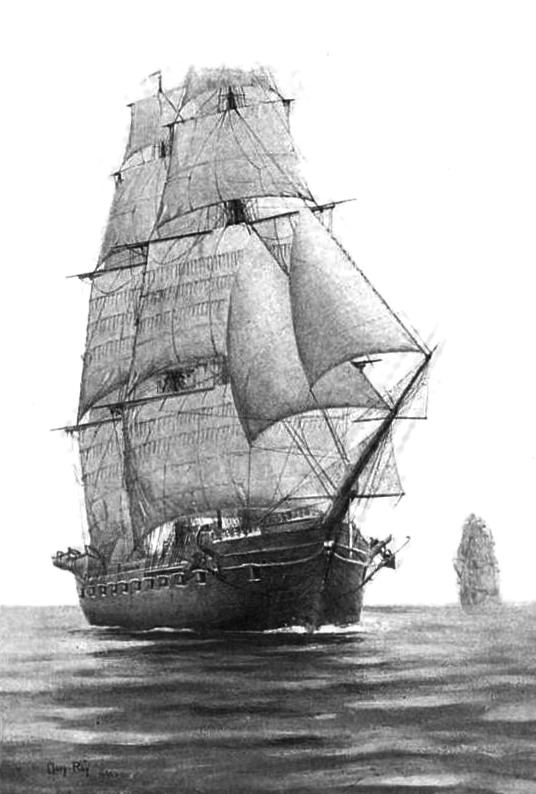
USS Portsmouth in full sail

Following the onset of the Civil War, Portsmouth home-ported and refitted between September and December 1861, then sailed for the Gulf of Mexico and duty with the Gulf Blockading Squadron. By the end of February 1862 she had captured two blockade runners off Texas. In April she participated in operations against Forts Jackson and St. Philip, then from May 1862 to August 1865 operated as station ship at New Orleans.

=== South America, Pacific, 1865–1878 ===
Continuing her varied career after peace was restored, Portsmouth served as quarantine vessel at New York, 1866–67; cruised off Brazil and Africa, 1869–71; carried relief personnel to Brazil in early 1872; and participated in survey assignments in the eastern Pacific, 1873–74. This included a stop at the Palmyra Atoll for several days, arriving there on 11 December 1873. Ship's surgeon William H. Jones performed a survey of the animal and plant life, as well as creating a detailed map of the atoll's islets and lagoons. In 1875 she conducted a cruise off the west coast of Latin America and on 14 July 1878 was decommissioned as a cruiser and assigned as a training ship for boys. On 25 July 1876 at Mare Island Naval Shipyard, Boatswain's Mate Alexander Parker attempted to rescue a shipmate from drowning, for which he was later awarded a Medal of Honor.

=== Training ship, 1878–1915 ===
In 1878 Portsmouth returned to the east coast, arriving at Washington, D.C., on 16 February. In March she sailed to France, returning in December to resume training ship duties on 17 January 1895, first with naval apprentices, then with the New Jersey Naval Militia, until March 1911. Three of her crewman earned the Medal of Honor during this period for jumping overboard to rescue fellow sailors: Boatswain's Mate Francis Moore on 23 January 1882, and Seaman Henry C. Courtney and Boatswain's Mate Thomas Cramen on 7 February 1882. Portsmouth was then loaned to the Public Health Service, Quarantine Station, Charleston, South Carolina to serve as a boarding launch. She was struck from the Navy List on 17 April 1915 and subsequently sold.

Portsmouth was taken to Governors Island, Boston Harbor, and burned on the night of 6–7 September 1915, the culmination of a South Boston carnival. The event was well attended by politicians and others, and a fireboat siren shrieked a salute as flames poured out of her empty gun ports.

== Bank of America logo ==
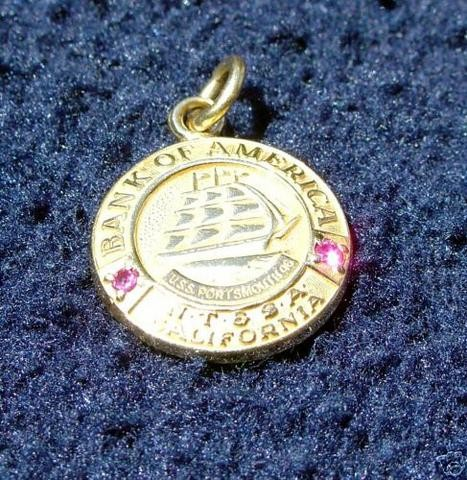
Service pin demonstrating Bank of America logo

The Portsmouth was adopted as the logo for the San Francisco-founded Bank of America by its founder, Amadeo Giannini, in recognition of the ship's role in securing the city. Service pins issued to employees by the bank not only feature the ship's image, but include its name inscribed beneath..

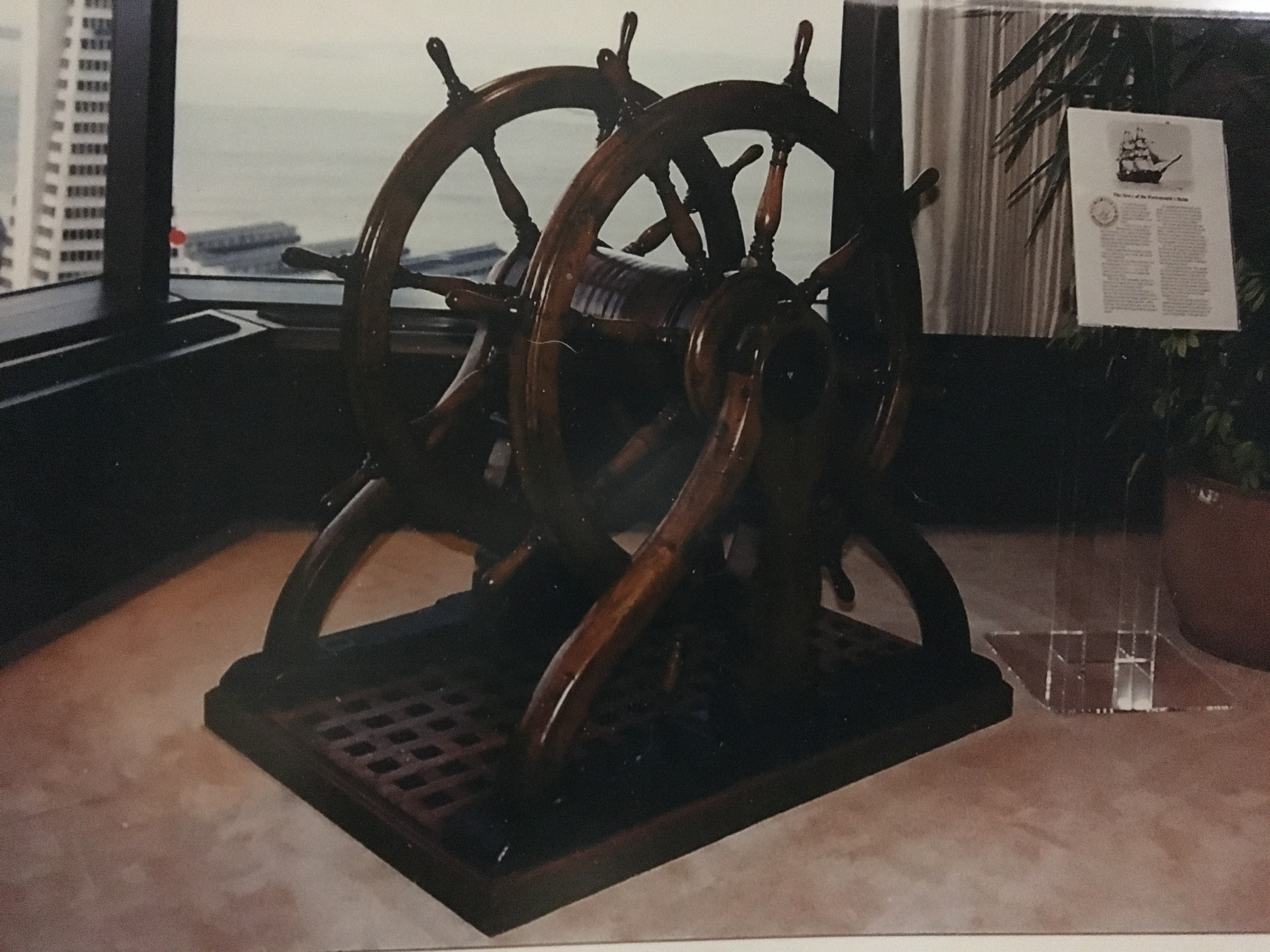
USS Portsmouth double helm at Bank of America Headquarters, 1995

The ship's helm was removed during decommissioning and was on display in the headquarter's reception area in 1995.

== Hoboken Civil War Memorial ==
Portsmouth served in the New Jersey Naval Militia in the early 1900s. Two Dahlgren guns from her are part of the Hoboken Civil War Memorial located at Stevens Park in Hoboken.

== See also ==
- Bibliography of early American naval history
- Union Navy

== Sources ==
- Downey, Joseph T., Ordinary Seaman, USN; Edited by Lamar, Howard. (1963-Reissued). The Cruise of the Portsmouth, 1845-1847, A Sailor's View of the Naval Conquest of California. Yale University Press.
- Eger, Christopher L. (March 2021). "Hudson Fulton Celebration, Part II". Warship International. LVIII (1): 58–81. ISSN 0043-0374.
- Robeson, George M. (9 June 1876). "General Order, No. 215". General Orders and Circulars Issued by the Navy Department (1863–1887). Washington, D.C.: United States Government Printing Office.
- "Medal of Honor Recipients - Interim Awards, 1871–1898". Medal of Honor Citations. United States Army Center of Military History. 2010. Archived from the original on 14 May 2017.
- Tucker, Spencer C., ed. (2013). The Encyclopedia of the Mexican-American War: A Political, Social, and Military History. Vol. 1. Santa Barbara, California: ABC-CLIO. ISBN 978-1-85109-853-8.
