= Carl Kimmons =

African-American naval officer

Carl Eugene Kimmons
- Born: April 10, 1920; Hamilton, Ohio, US
- Died: August 4, 2016 (aged 96); Waterford, Connecticut, US
- Burial place: Arlington National Cemetery
- Education: Connecticut College (BS); University of Connecticut (MA)
- Military career
- Branch: United States Navy
- Service years: 1940–1970
- Rank: Lieutenant
- Other work: Schoolteacher

Carl Eugene Kimmons (April 10, 1920 – August 4, 2016) was an American naval officer and World War II submariner who served in the United States Navy from 1940 to 1970. Kimmons was the first person who had enlisted as a mess attendant to serve in every enlisted pay grade from E1 through E9 and end up a commissioned officer. He retired as a full lieutenant after 30 years of service (1940–1970).

== Early life and service ==
Carl Kimmons was born in Hamilton, Ohio, United States on April 10, 1920. He graduated from high school in 1939 and worked for the Civilian Conservation Corps. He enlisted in the United States Navy in 1940, when racial segregation and discrimination limited African American sailors to low-ranked positions. Kimmons became a mess attendant, feeding and cleaning up after the white officers. After undergoing basic training at Norfolk, Virginia, he was assigned to the destroyer USS McFarland in California in September 1940, where he took on administrative duties such as typing reports and maintaining the ship's log.

== Combat service ==
In 1942, Kimmons requested submarine duty and was assigned to the USS Plunger (SS-179). From 1942 to late 1944, Kimmons served on three submarines and made seven war patrols. His first four patrols took place on the Plunger, where Kimmons was among the crew members responsible for loading torpedoes and manning the .50 caliber deck gun. In November 1943, Kimmons joined the new Balao-class submarine USS Parche (SS-384) and made his three final war patrols. On July 31, 1943, the Parche attacked an Imperial Japanese Navy convoy, sinking two enemy ships and damaging three others in the space of 48 minutes. The American commander, Lawson P. Ramage, received the Medal of Honor while Kimmons and the rest of the crew received a Presidential Unit Citation. Kimmons redeployed to the USS Cobbler (SS-344) during the closing months of World War II.

== Post-1945 service ==
In October 1947, following President Harry S. Truman's executive order that opened all rates to Black servicemen, Kimmons took a pay cut to move from steward 1st class to yeoman 2nd class, which had more potential for promotion. He rose to the rate of chief yeoman by 1952 and did shore duty at the naval station in San Juan, Puerto Rico. In mid-1956, he was transferred to serve aboard the USS Fulton (AS-11), where he advanced to senior chief and master chief yeoman. In 1961, he attended officer training school in Newport, Rhode Island, graduating in May 1961. He then served in the US Hydrographic Office in Washington, D.C., where he worked in administration, security, and top secret control. In 1963, Kimmons continued these responsibilities at the submarine base in New London. His final assignment was to the Navy's underwater sound laboratory in New London, where he served as security officer from 1968 to 1970.

== Second career ==
Settling in Connecticut after retirement, Kimmons graduated magna cum laude with a Bachelor of Science degree in history from Connecticut College in 1973. The college had begun accepting male students only a year before. He continued his education by earning a Master of Arts in education and history from the University of Connecticut and a sixth-year certificate from Southern Connecticut State University. Kimmons worked as a social studies teacher in Waterford high schools for 22 years before retiring from his second career.

In 1987, the Booker T. Washington Community Center of Hamilton, Ohio, named Kimmons to its Hall of Fame.

== Personal life ==
In July 1943, Kimmons married Thelma Jean Lewis, a high school classmate. The couple had three children: Karen, Larry, and Kimberly.

Kimmons died on August 4, 2016, at the age of 96. His wife and daughters survived him. He was interred at Arlington National Cemetery.
