= USS Rednour =

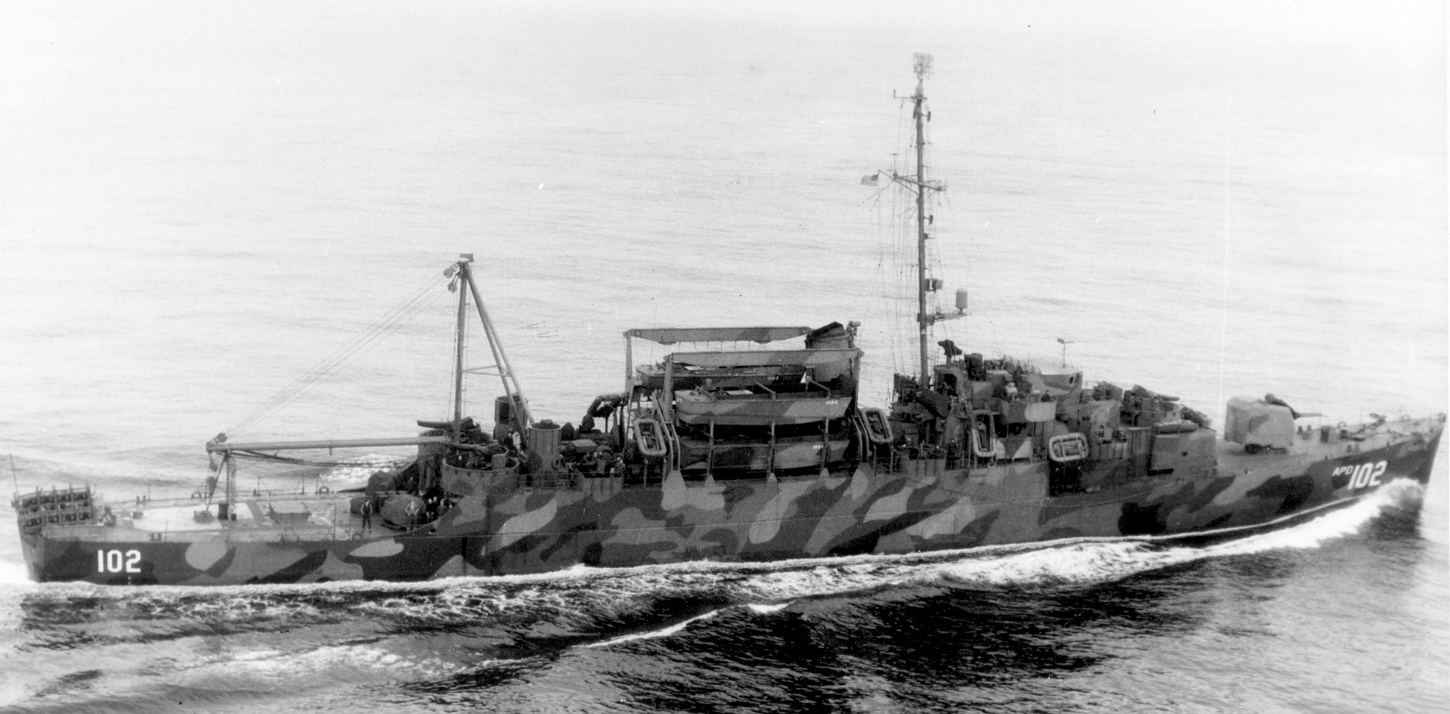
- USS Rednour

History

United States
- Name: USS Rednour (APD-102)
- Namesake: Forrest O. Rednour
- Builder: Bethlehem-Hingham Shipyard, Inc., Hingham, Massachusetts
- Laid down: 30 December 1943
- Launched: 12 February 1944
- Sponsored by: Mrs. Forrest O. Rednour
- Reclassified: APD-102, 17 July 1944
- Commissioned: 30 December 1944
- Decommissioned: 24 July 1946
- Stricken: 1 March 1967
- Honors and awards: 1 battle star, World War II
- Fate: Transferred to Mexican Navy, December 1969

History

Mexico
- Name: ARM Chihuahua (B08)
- Namesake: Chihuahua
- Acquired: December 1969
- Renamed: ARM José María Morelos y Pavón (B08), 1994
- Namesake: José María Morelos y Pavón
- Renamed: ARM Chihuahua (E22)
- Stricken: 16 July 2001

General characteristics
- Class & type: Rudderow-class destroyer escort, as ordered
- Class & type: Crosley-class high speed transport, as completed
- Displacement: 2,130 long tons (2,164 t) full
- Length: 306 ft (93 m)
- Beam: 37 ft (11 m)
- Draft: 12 ft 7 in (3.84 m)
- Speed: 23 knots (43 km/h; 26 mph)
- Troops: 162
- Complement: 204
- Armament: 1 × 5 in (130 mm) gun; 6 × 40 mm guns; 6 × 20 mm guns; 2 × depth charge tracks

USS Rednour (APD-102) was a Crosley-class high speed transport that served in the United States Navy from 1945 to 1946. In December 1969, she was transferred to Mexico and served under the name Chihuahua until July 2001.

== History ==
=== Construction and commissioning ===
Rednour was laid down as the Rudderow-class destroyer escort USS Rednour (DE-592) on 30 December 1943 by Bethlehem-Hingham Shipyard, Inc., at Hingham, Massachusetts, and was launched on 12 February 1944, sponsored by Mrs. Ruth Harriet Rednour, the widow of the ship's namesake, Ship's Cook Second Class Forrest O. Rednour, USCG. Rednour and Douglas A. Munro are the only two Coast Guardsmen ever honored as namesakes of U.S. Navy ships. The ship was reclassified as a Crosley-class high-speed transport and redesignated APD-102 on 17 July 1944. After conversion to her new role, she was commissioned on 30 December 1944.

=== U.S. Navy (1944–1946) ===
==== Pacific War ====
After shakedown in Bermudan waters, Rednour arrived in Norfolk, Virginia, on 7 February 1945. She then underwent amphibious training in the Chesapeake Bay and coastal training operations, after which she departed Melville, Rhode Island, on 24 February 1945, bound for World War II service in the Pacific.

Arriving at San Diego, California, on 11 March 1945, rednour engaged in a week of coastal training exercises before standing in to Pearl Harbor, Territory of Hawaii, on 25 March 1945. There she assisted in the training of underwater demolition teams through 8 April 1945, when she steamed as an escort for several cargo ships en route Ulithi Atoll via the Marshall Islands.

Rednour departed Ulithi Atoll on 23 April 1945, overtaking a convoy which arrived off the Hagushi beaches of Okinawa on 26 April 1945. She supported the Okinawa campaign, patrolling off Kerama Retto through the following month and assisted in the screening of inward- and outward-bound convoys. She also assisted in repelling almost constant air raids.

===== Okinawa, kamikaze =====
On the night of 27 May 1945, Rednour assumed an antiaircraft patrol station 14 nautical miles (26 kilometers)west of Zampa-Misaki (Point Bolo), Okinawa, in company with high-speed transport USS Loy (APD-56) and destroyer escort USS Eisele (DE-34). Shortly before midnight, the first of several kamikaze suicide planes which attacked Loy was exploded in midair by antiaircraft fire, but a second aircraft crashed Loy. A third aircraft evaded the gunfire, but a fourth closed rapidly on Rednour's starboard bow. Despite the withering curtain of fire thrown up by her gunners, the plane crashed Rednour's stern, starting fires and blowing a 10-foot (3-meter) hole in her main deck. Three men were killed and 13 wounded. After driving off yet another suicide plane, Rednour entered Kerama roadstead for temporary battle damage repairs.

Departing Okinawa on 14 June 1945, Rednour steamed for California, stopping en route at both Leyte in the Philippine Islands and Pearl Harbor. Arriving at San Pedro, California, on 22 July 1945, she underwent a general overhaul. World War II came to end with the surrender of Japan on 15 August 1945 while Rednour was in California.

==== Postwar ====
Her overhaul complete, Rednour got underway for service in the Marshall-Gilbert Islands Command with Transport Division 104. Steaming via Pearl Harbor and Saipan, she arrived at Eniwetok on 15 September 1945. During the following months she carried passengers, vehicles, provisions, and other cargo between Eniwetok, Wake Island, Ponape, and Kwajalein. From 29 October 1945 through 5 November 1945, she served as headquarters ship for a hydrographic survey party from the survey ship USS Hydrographer (AGS-2) in the area of Taongi Atoll.

Rednour's inter-island transport service ended on 5 January 1946 when she departed Kwajalein with the staff and records of the Marshall-Gilberts Command, bound for Guam. Debarking her passengers and records at Apra Harbor, Guam, on 9 January 1946, she set course for the United States via Kwajalein and Pearl Harbor, arriving at San Pedro on 2 February 1946.

Departing San Pedro on 20 February 1946, Rednour transited the Panama Canal and arrived at Norfolk, Virginia, on 8 March 1946 to prepare for inactivation. She departed Norfolk on 31 March 1946 bound for Green Cove Springs, Florida.

==== Decommissioning ====
Rednour decommissioned at Green Cove Springs on 24 July 1946, and was assigned to the Florida Group of the Atlantic Reserve Fleet there. She later was towed to Orange, Texas, to become part of the Texas Group of the Atlantic Reserve Fleet, and while there was stricken from the Navy List on 1 March 1967.

=== Mexican Navy (1969–2001) ===
Rednour was transferred to Mexico in December 1969. She served in the Mexican Navy as ARM Chihuahua (B08) and was renamed ARM José María Morelos y Pavón in 1994. Her name was later restored to Chihuahua with the new pennant number of E22. Chihuahua was stricken from the Mexican Navy on 16 July 2001.

== Honors and awards ==
Rednour received one battle star for her World War II service.
