= Joint Culinary Center of Excellence =

Joint Culinary Center of Excellence (JCCoE)
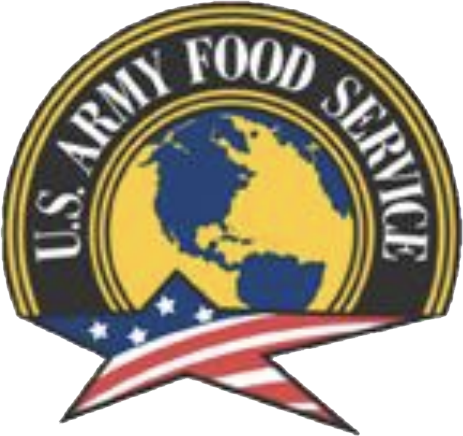
- Active: 2009 - present
- Country: United States
- Branch: United States Army; United States Marine Corps; United States Air Force; United States Navy
- Part of: United States Army Combined Arms Command
- Garrison/HQ: Ft. Lee, Virginia

The Joint Culinary Center of Excellence (JCCoE) is a subordinate unit of the U.S. Army Quartermaster School at Fort Lee, Virginia. Their mission is to improve dining facility (DFAC) food quality, staff efficiency and culinary knowledge via Food Management Assistance Teams (FMAT) to improve soldier readiness. The JCCoE also runs the annual Joint Culinary Training Exercise (JCTE) competition, the largest American Culinary Federation (ACF) competition in North America.

== History ==
In February 1989 the Army Center of Excellence, Subsistence (ACES) was created by the Department of the Army under the U.S. Army Quartermaster Center and School (QMC&S) at Ft. Lee, Virginia. In September 2009, ACES was renamed the Joint Culinary Center of Excellence (JCCoE) and in 2025 it was further redesignated as the Joint Culinary Training Department (JCTD) under the JCCoE umbrella. The JCTD is responsible for basic and advance culinary training for the Army, Navy, Marine Corps and Air Force.

== Subordinate directorates ==
- JCCoE Operations Directorate
- Special Programs Directorate
- Joint Culinary Training Directorate
