= Galley (kitchen) =

Kitchen on board a vehicle

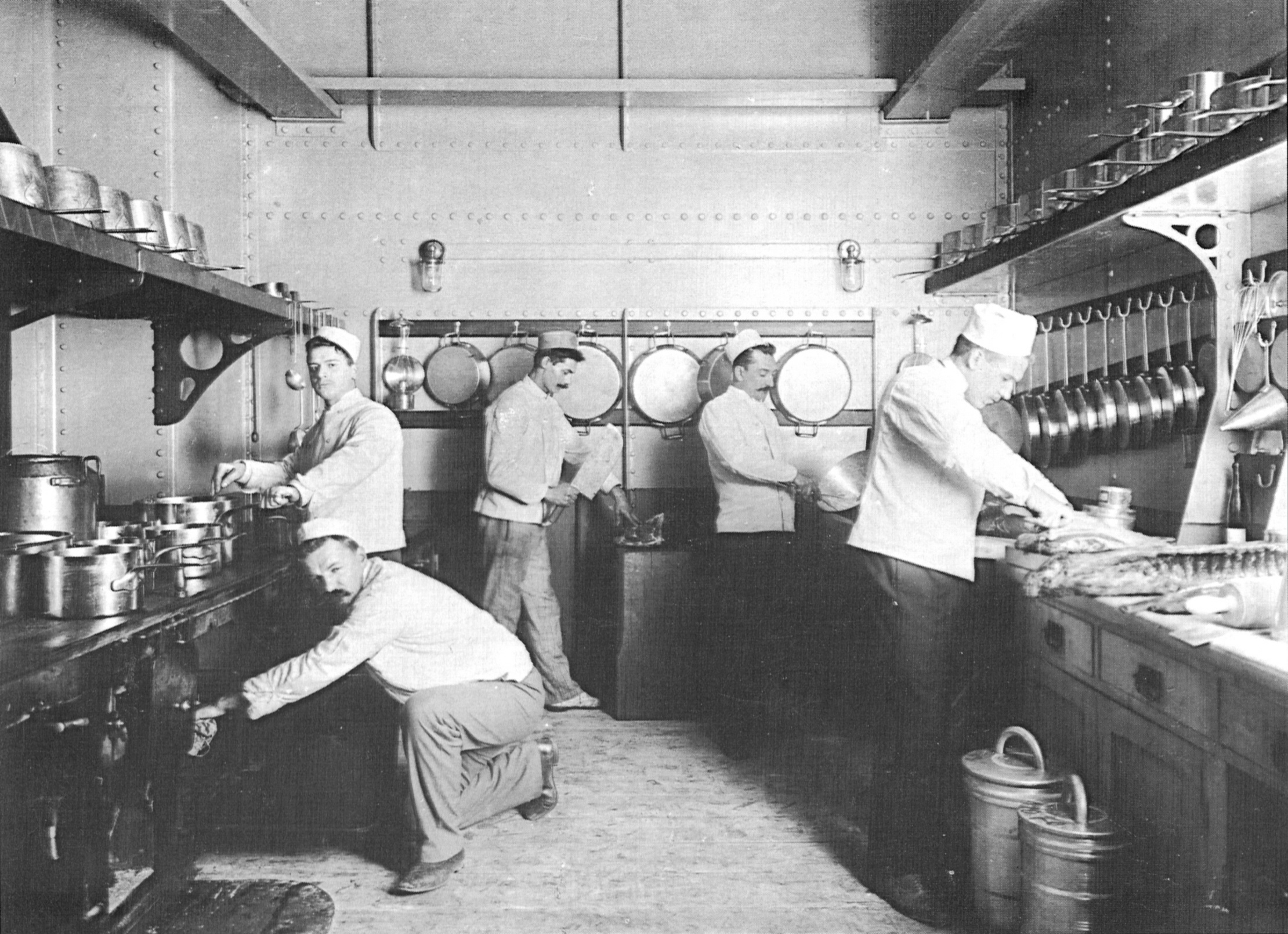
Galley of the Austrian passenger ship SS Africa in the Mediterranean Sea, c. 1905

The galley is the compartment of a ship, train, or aircraft where food is cooked and prepared. It can also refer to a land-based kitchen on a naval base, or, from a kitchen design point of view, to a straight design of the kitchen layout.

== Ship's cooking area ==
A fork galley is the cooking area aboard a vessel, usually laid out in an efficient typical style with longitudinal units and overhead cabinets. This makes the best use of the usually limited space aboard ships. It also caters for the rolling and heaving nature of ships, making them more resistant to the effects of the movement of the ship. For this reason galley stoves are often gimballed, so that the liquid in pans does not spill out. They are also commonly equipped with bars, preventing the cook from falling against the hot stove.

A small cooking area on deck is called a caboose or camboose, originating from the Dutch: kombuis, which is still in use today. In English it is a term used only for a cooking area that is abovedecks.

== Aviation kitchen ==
The first basic aircraft kitchens were onboard various airships during the 1920s and 1930s. The first airplane kitchen was patented by Werner Sell (Georg Robert Werner Sell) of Germany in 1930. The first fitted kitchens were delivered in 1954, and by 1955 all Lufthansa commercial planes had been fitted with a Sell galley.

Galleys on commercial airlines typically not only include facilities to serve and store food and beverages, but also contain flight attendant jumpseats, emergency equipment storage, as well as anything else flight attendants may need during the flight. Aircraft in operation today mainly use the familiar airline service trolley system.

== Household kitchen ==
The term galley kitchen is also used to refer to the design of household kitchen wherein the units are fitted into a continuous array with no kitchen table, allowing maximum use of a restricted space, and work with the minimum of required movement between units. Such kitchens increase storage space by working vertically, with hanging pots, dish racks, and ceiling-hung cabinets common. Strictly, the term refers to a kitchen with the units in two facing lines, but is often used to refer to U-shaped kitchens as well.

The first mass-produced galley kitchen design was known as the Frankfurt kitchen, designed by Margarete Schütte-Lihotzky, working under the direction of Ernst May in 1926 for a Frankfurt housing estate. 10,000 units were installed in Frankfurt, and it was the most successful and influential kitchen of the period.

== Gallery ==
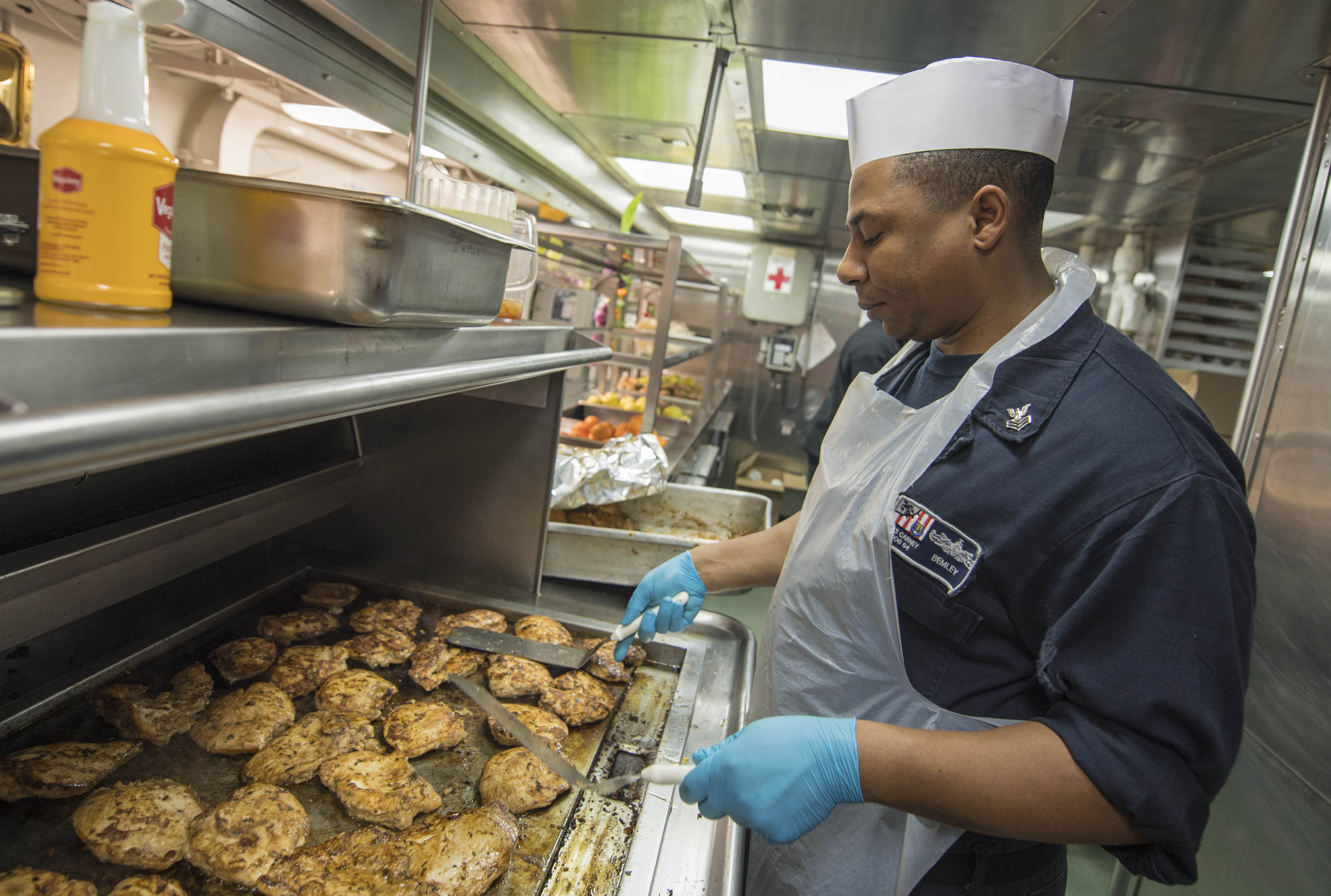
Galley of USS Carney

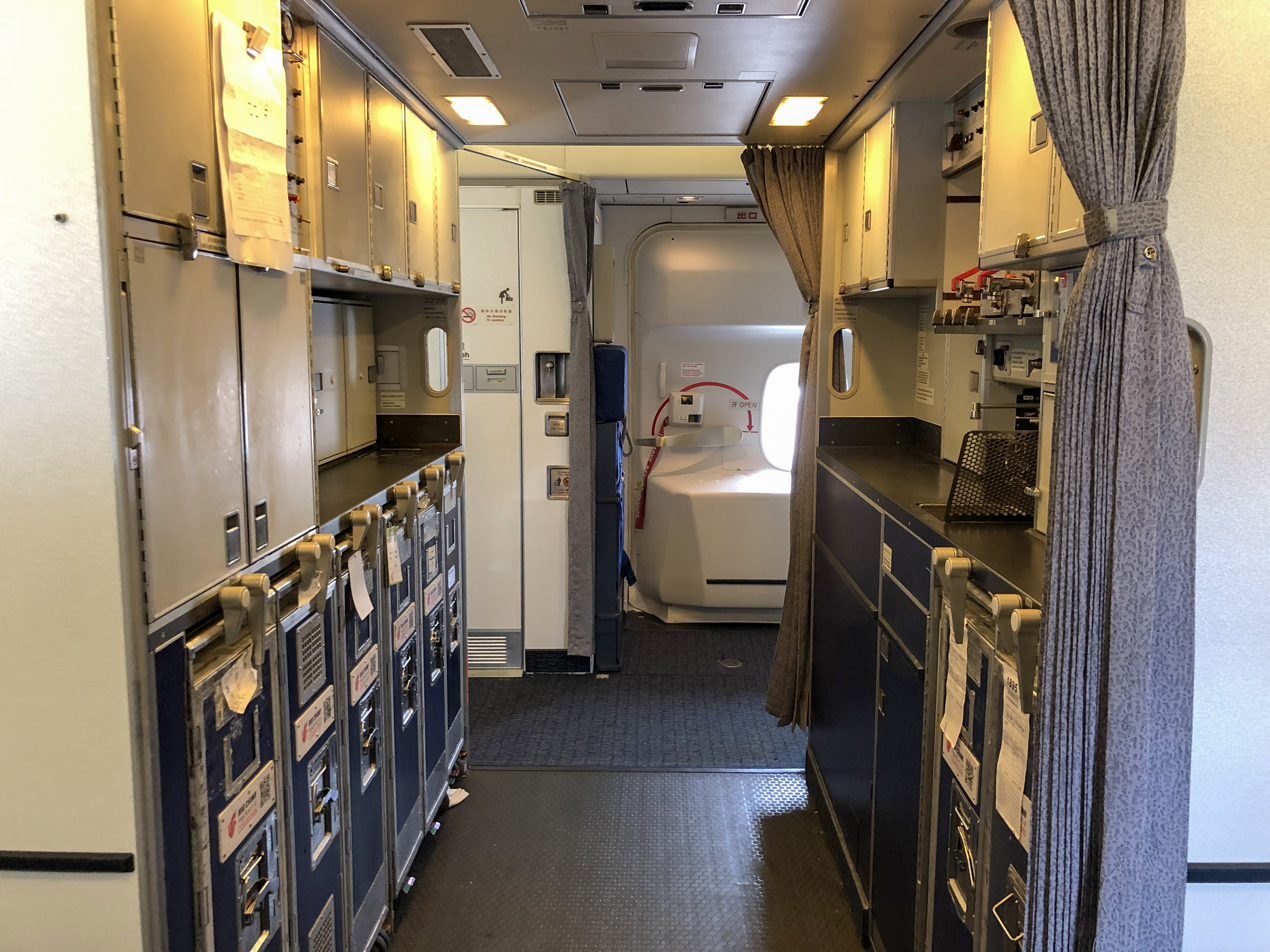
Galley aboard a Boeing 747-400

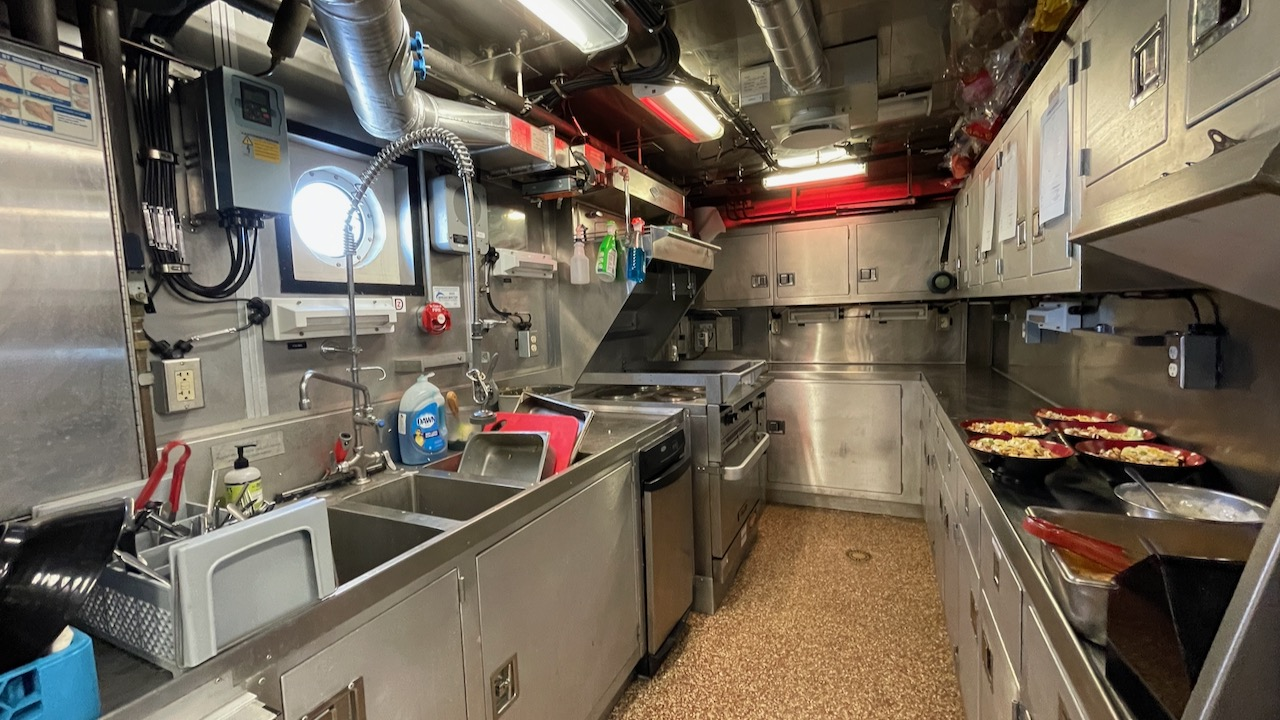
Galley aboard a USCG Sentinel-class Fast Response Cutter

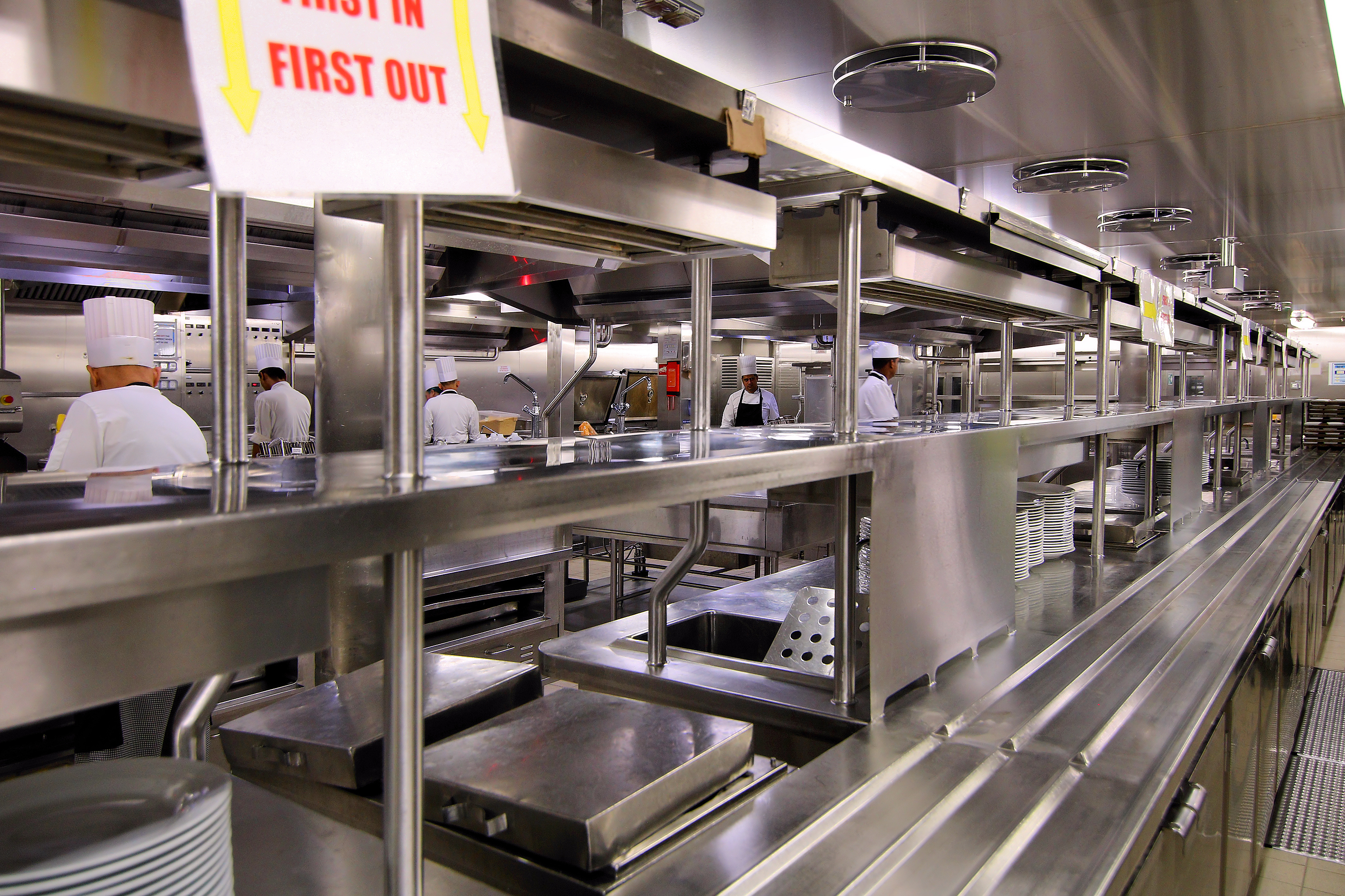
Galley aboard the Harmony of the Seas cruise ship

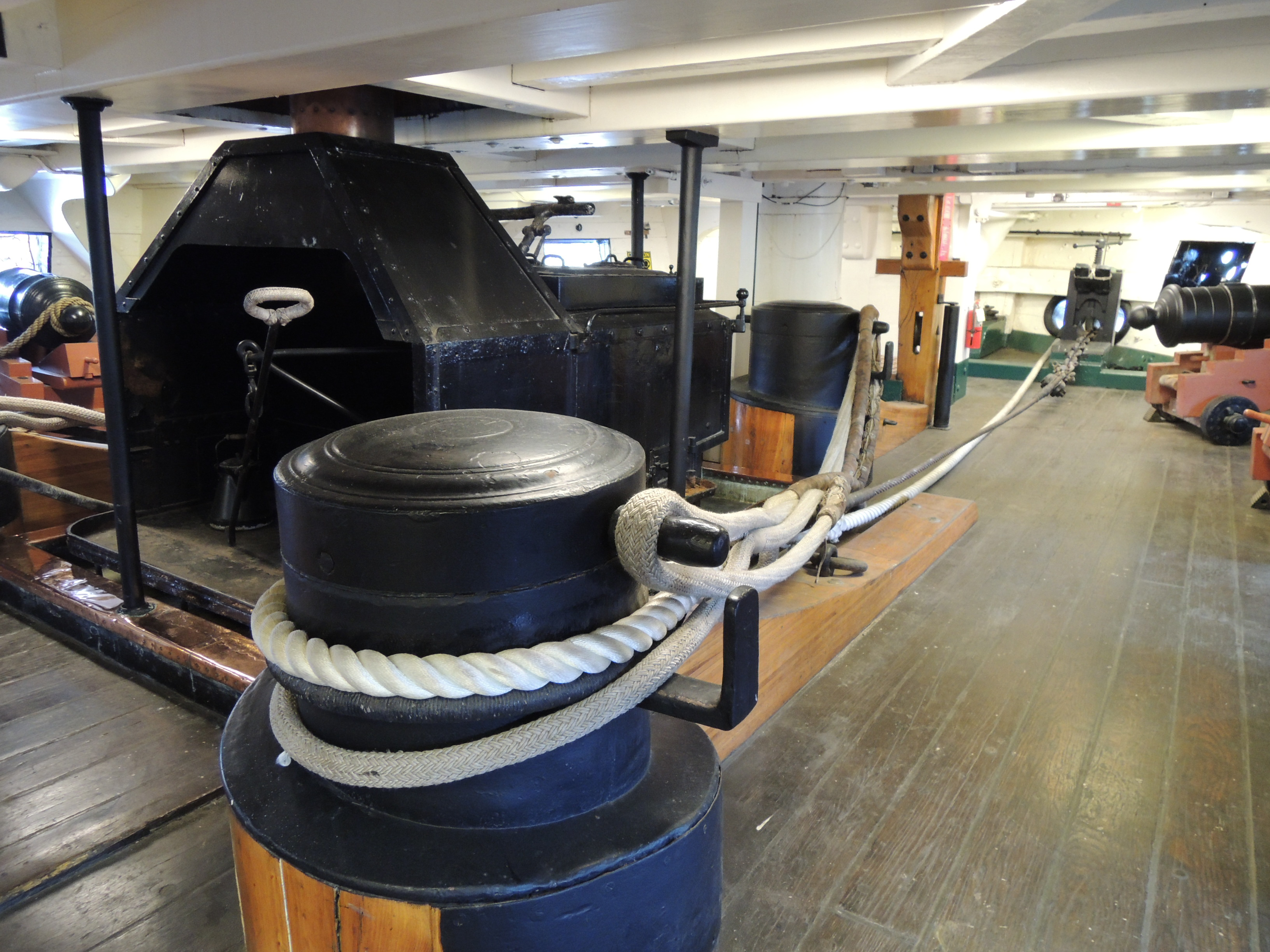
Galley area of USS Constitution

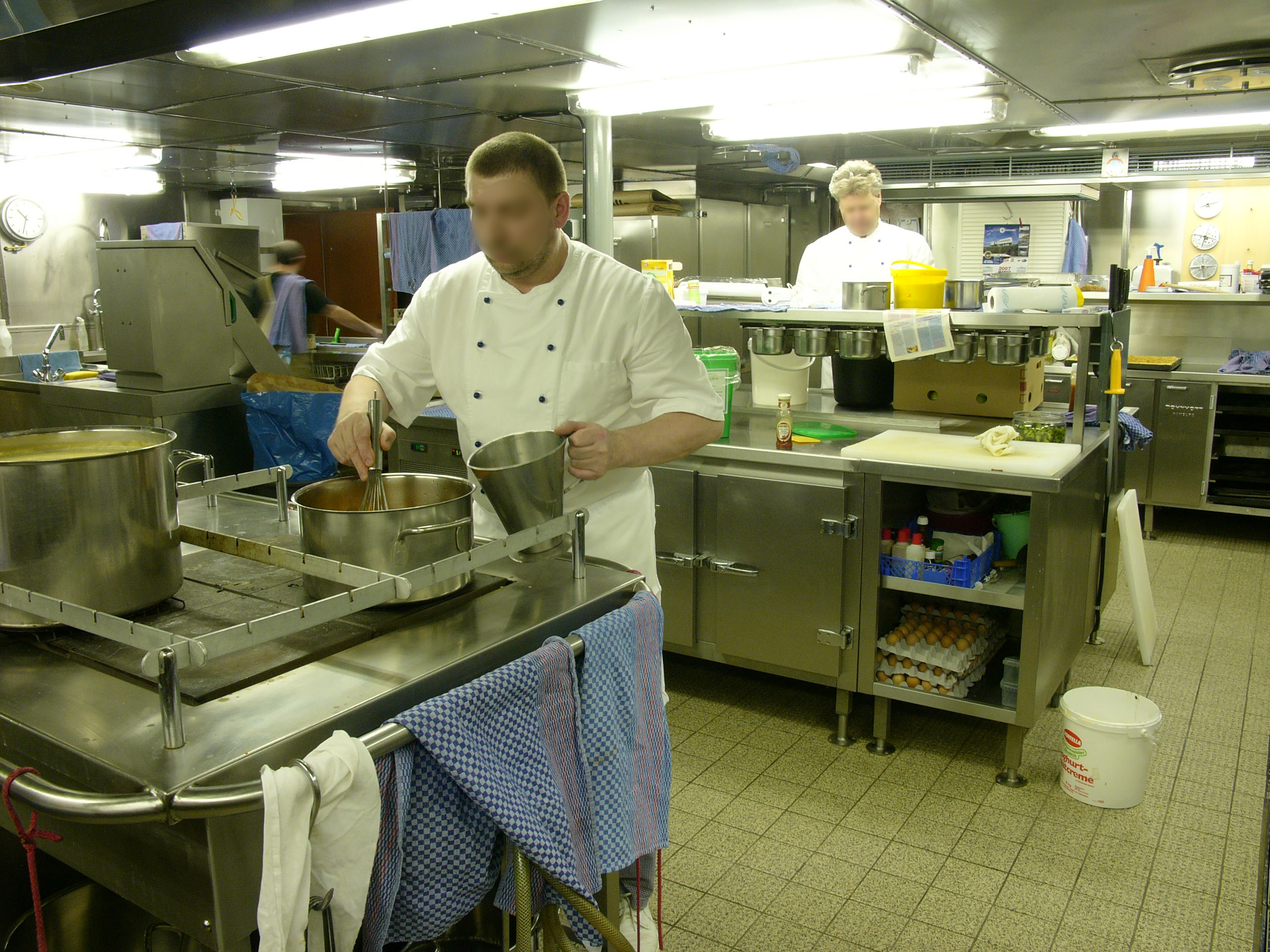
Galley of RV Polarstern

== See also ==
- Chief cook
- Chief steward
- Culinary specialist (United States Navy)
- Steward's assistant
- Provisioning of USS Constitution
