= Forrest O. Rednour =

United States Coast Guard Navy and Marine Corps Medal recipient

Forrest Oren Rednour
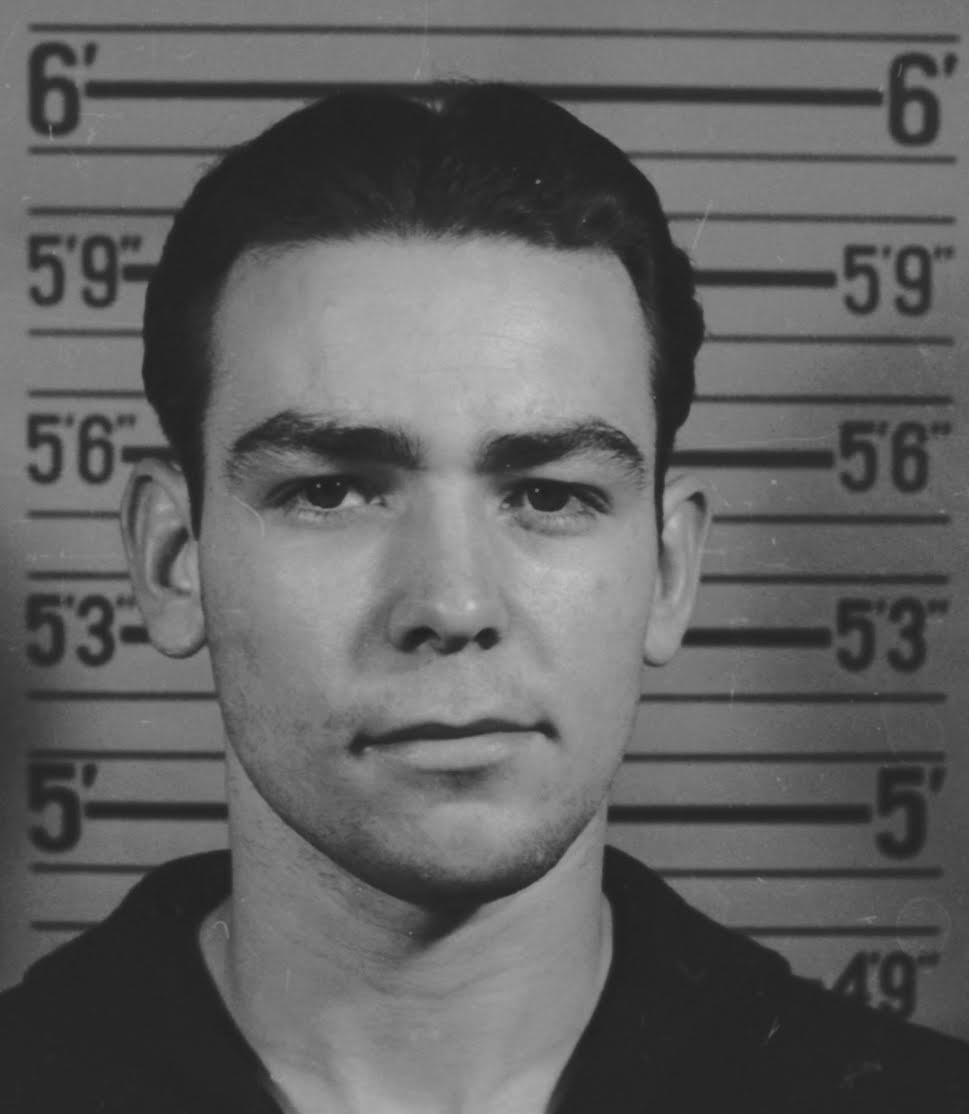
- Service record photo
- Born: May 13, 1923; Cutler, Illinois
- Died: June 13, 1943 (aged 20); USCGC Escanaba, North Atlantic Ocean, off Ivituut, Greenland
- Military career
- Allegiance: United States of America
- Branch: United States Coast Guard
- Service years: 1941–1943
- Rank: Ships Cook Second Class
- Unit: USCGC Escanaba (WPG-77)
- Conflicts: World War II: Atlantic War; Sinking of SS Dorchester; Sinking of USCGC Escanaba †
- Awards: Navy and Marine Corps Medal

Forrest O. Rednour (1923–1943) was a United States coast guardsman who received the Navy and Marine Corps Medal posthumously for his actions during World War II.

== Biography ==
Forrest Oren Rednour was born in Cutler, Illinois, on 13 May 1923. He enlisted in the United States Coast Guard in Chicago, Illinois, on 19 June 1941.

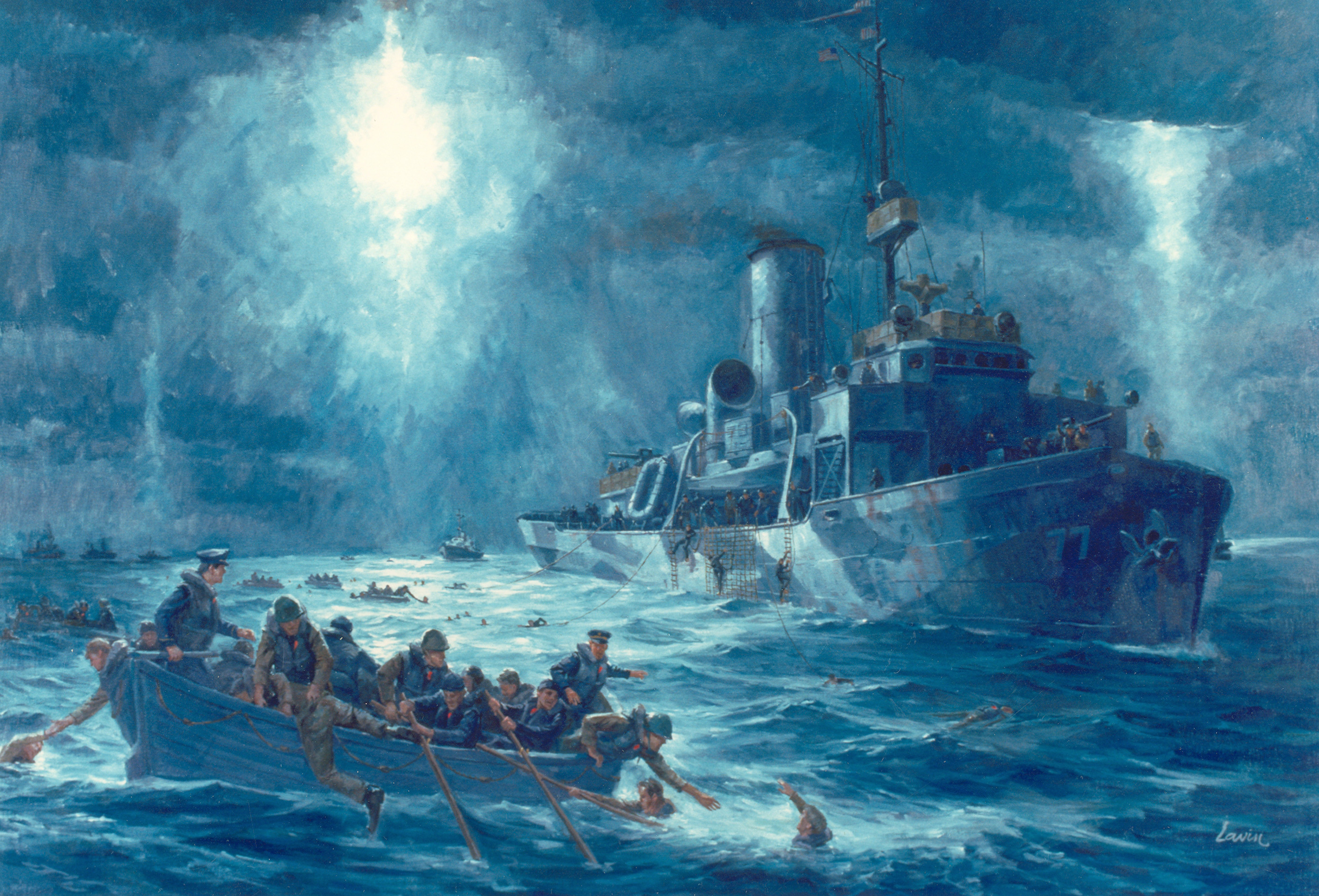
The rescue of Dorchester survivors by USCGC Escanaba (WPG-77) on 3 February 1943.

During the predawn darkness of 3 February 1943, Rednour, wearing a rubber suit to ward off hypothermia, was among the members of the crew of the United States Coast Guard Cutter USCGC Escanaba (WPG-77) who voluntarily subjected themselves to pounding seas and bitter cold in the winter North Atlantic darkness for nearly four hours to rescue survivors from the torpedoed troop transport Dorchester. Realizing the "... danger of being crushed between the rafts and the ship's side, or of being struck by a propeller blade if the engines backed, he swam in under the counter of the constantly maneuvering Escanaba and prevented many floating survivors from being caught in the suction of the screws, in one instance retrieving a loaded raft." Rednour worked the longest of all retrievers and accounted for the greatest number of survivors, but finally had to quit when his rubber suit became torn.

Rednour perished early on the morning of 13 June 1943 when Escanaba disintegrated in a massive explosion of undetermined cause in the North Atlantic Ocean off Ivituut, Greenland, with a loss of 101 of the 103 men aboard.

== Awards ==
Rednour was posthumously awarded the Navy and Marine Corps Medal for heroic action during the Dorchester rescue operations of 3 February 1943.

== Namesakes ==
The United States Navy destroyer escort USS Rednour (DE-592) was named for Forrest Rednour, one of only two Coast Guardsmen honored by the naming of a U.S. Navy ship. She was converted into a high-speed transport during construction and was in commission as such as USS Rednour (APD-102) from 1944 to 1946.

The United States Coast Guard's Forrest O. Rednour Memorial Award Program For Excellence in Food Service also is named for Rednour.

In 2015 it was announced that the Sentinel-class fast response cutter USCGC Forrest Rednour (WPC-1129) would bear his name.
