= Jack of the dust =

Obsolete enlisted rating of the US Navy

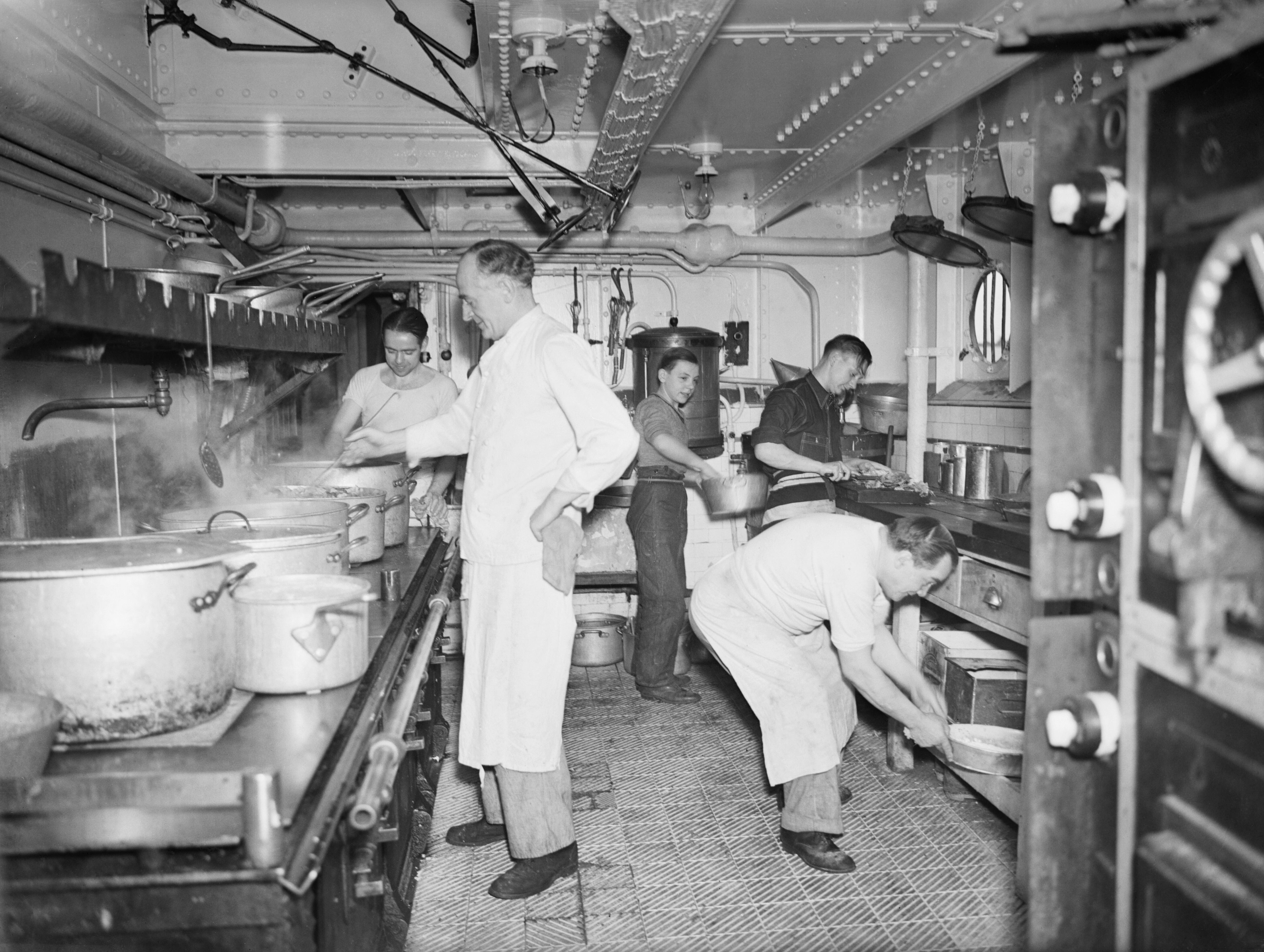
Royal Navy cooks during WWII

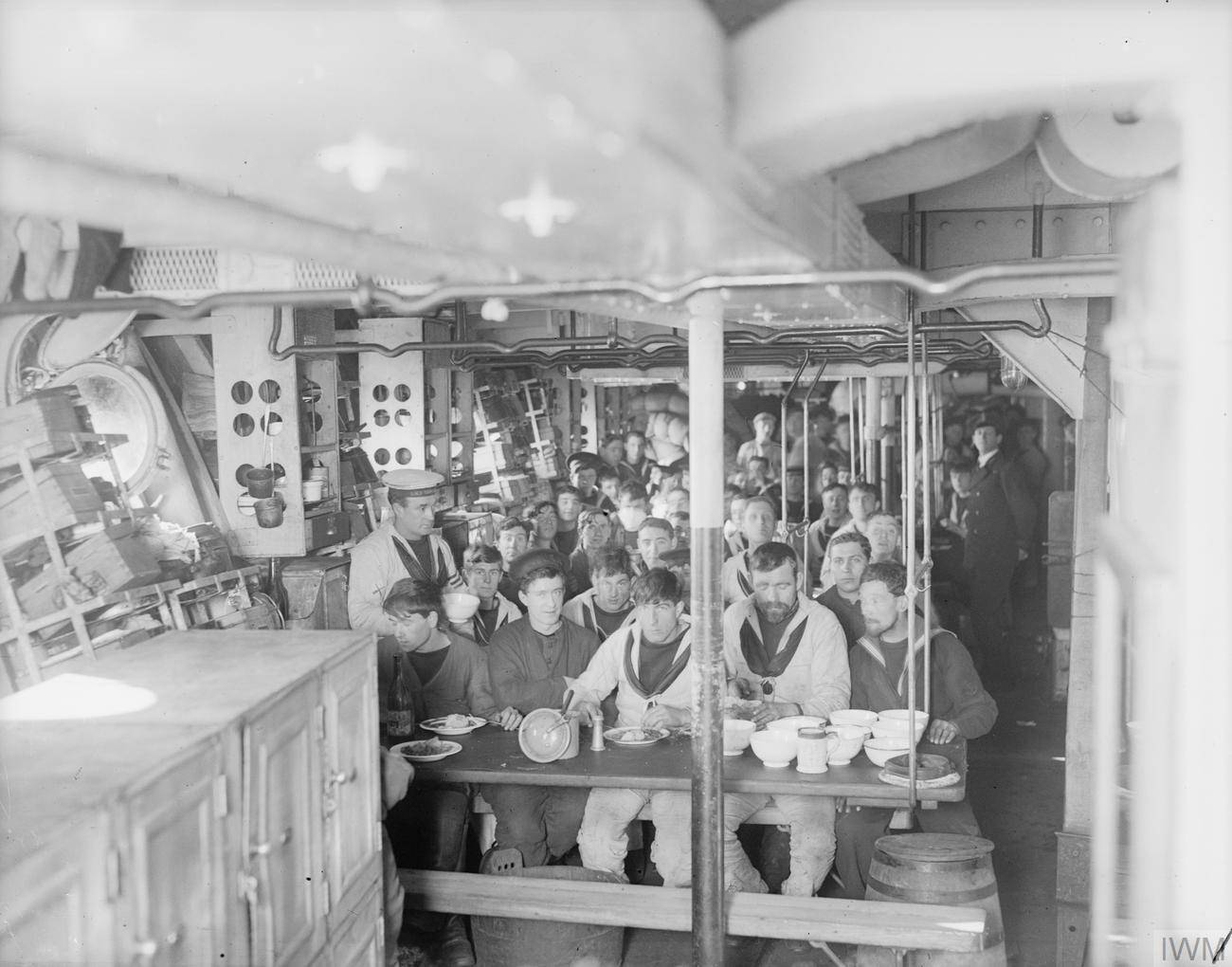
Navy Mess

Jack of the dust is an obsolete enlisted rating of the United States Navy and was used in the Navy Supply Corps. The modern U.S. Navy equivalent is Culinary specialist.

The term has its origin in the Royal Navy of the early 1800s when ship's stewards or purser's assistants were known as "Jack-in-the-dust", referring to the dusty atmosphere in the bread storeroom (called the "bread-room") created by issuing quantities of flour and dried biscuit.

Other names used for Jack of the dust were "Breadroom Jack", "Dusty Boy", "Dips", and "Jack Dusty".

The US naval rating was discontinued in the late 19th century, but the term survived as a formal title until World War II. As of 2002 "Jack of the dust" was still in use on some ships as an informal title for a culinary specialist in charge of the canned goods storeroom.

== See also ==
- Culinary specialist (United States Navy) – United States Navy occupational rating
- Provisioning of USS Constitution - Example of typical early 19th century Navy provisions
