= KD Selangor =

Kedah-class offshore patrol vessel

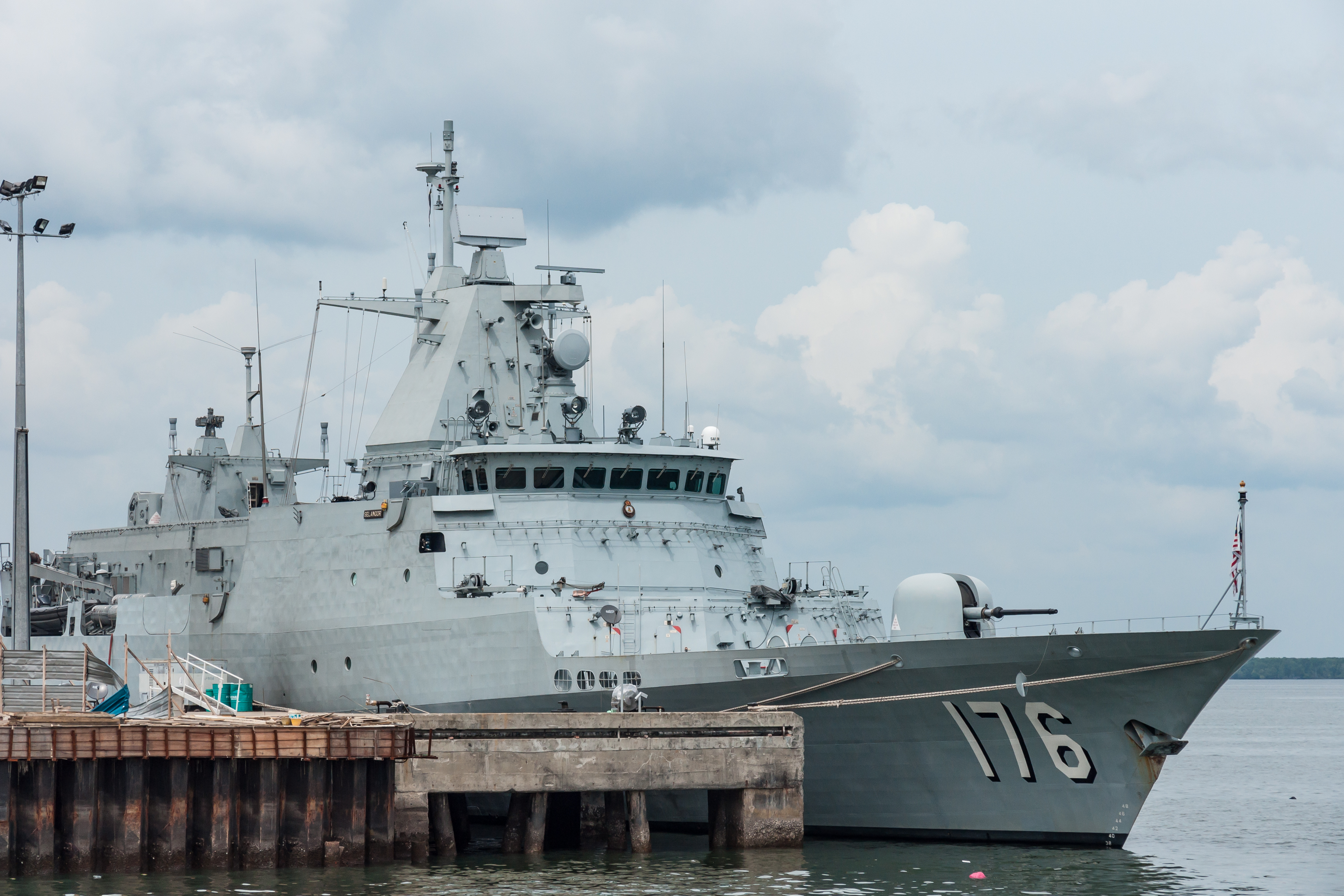
- KD Selangor on 28 July 2012

History

Malaysia
- Name: Selangor
- Namesake: Selangor
- Builder: BHIC, Kuala Lumpur
- Laid down: July 2006
- Launched: 23 July 2009
- Commissioned: 28 December 2010
- Identification: IMO number: 9874040; MMSI number: 533001930; Callsign: 9MJW; Pennant number: F176
- Status: Active
- Badge

General characteristics
- Class & type: Kedah-class offshore patrol vessel
- Displacement: 1,850 tons full load
- Length: 91.1 m (299 ft)
- Beam: 12.85 m (42.2 ft)
- Draught: 3.4 m (11 ft)
- Propulsion: Main propulsion: 2x Caterpillar 3616 (5,450kW) diesel, 16,000 bhp, 2 shafts, 2 controllable pitch propellers
- Speed: 24 knots (44 km/h; 28 mph)
- Range: 6,050 nautical miles (11,200 km; 6,960 mi)
- Endurance: 21 days
- Complement: 78 (accom. for 98)
- Sensors & processing systems: Combat system: Atlas Elektronik COSYS-110 M1/ARGOS; Integrated platform management system: CAE; Search radar: EADS TRS-3D/ 16ES PESA radar; Fire control radar: Oerlikon Contraves TMX/EO X-band with electro-optic fire director; Thermal imager: Rheinmetall TMEO; Sonar: L-3 ELAC Nautik NDS-3060 Obstacle Avoidance sonar; IFF system: Aeromaritime
- Electronic warfare & decoys: ESM: Thales Sceptre-X; Decoy: Sippican ALEX/SRBOC chaff / decoy launching system
- Armament: 1 × 76 mm Oto Melara; 1 × 30 mm Breda-Mauser
- Aircraft carried: 1 x Super Lynx 300
- Aviation facilities: Stern hangar; Helicopter landing platform

KD Selangor (F176) is the sixth ship of Kedah-class offshore patrol vessel of the Royal Malaysian Navy. She was commissioned on 28 December 2010.

== Development and design ==
In the 1990s, the Royal Malaysian Navy identified the need to replace its ageing patrol boats. These 31 m long vessels, built by Vosper Ltd with a displacement of 96 tons, had been in service since the 1960s. After receiving government approval, the Malaysian Navy ran a competition for the design in 1996, planning to purchase 27 vessels over 15 years. The specifications aimed for a design with a displacement of 1,300 tons and an overall length of 80 m. It was already noted at that time that this resembled full-fledged corvettes rather than patrol vessels, but the eventual winning bid would turn out to be even larger. The Australian bid proposed a Joint Patrol Vessel, to be designed by Australian Transfield Shipbuilding and subsequently purchased by the Malaysian Navy as well as the Royal Australian Navy. Other contenders were the German Naval Group consortium as well as British shipyards Vosper Thornycroft and Yarrow Shipbuilders.

The Kedah class is based on the MEKO 100 corvette. It is designed to have low radar detectability, low noise, low heat dissipation, and have an economical cruising speed. The main radar, TRS-3D/16-ES is a fully coherent multi-mode phased array C-band radar capable of fully automatic detection, track initiation, and classification of various types of targets. It is capable to track 400 air and surface targets with the detection range up to 200 km and the corresponding update times between 1 and 6 seconds. An advanced control system known as Integrated Platform Management System (IPMS) is used to monitor and control the platform machinery of the ship, including propulsion, electrical, damage control, and auxiliary machinery and systems.

== Construction and career ==
Selangor was laid down in July 2006 at Boustead Heavy Industries Corporation, Lumut, Perak and launched on 23 July 2009. She was commissioned on 28 December 2010.
