= List of ship launches in 2003 =

The list of ship launches in 2003 includes a chronological list of all ships launched in 2003.

Date	Ship	Class / type	Builder	Location	Country	Notes
4 January	Berlin Express	Hamburg-Express-class container ship	Hyundai Heavy Industries	Ulsan	South Korea	For Hapag Lloyd
8 January	Coneste	Sietas type 178 container ship	Daewoo Mangalia	Mangalia	Romania	For Bernd Bartels
18 January	Eurostar Valencia	Ro-pax ferry	Cantiere Navale Visentini	Donada	Italy	For Grimaldi Group
19 January	Axel Mærsk	Mærsk A-class container ship	Odense Staalskibsvaerft	Lindø	Denmark	For Maersk Line
4 February	Rio Alexander		Estaleiros Navais de Viana do Castelo	Viana do Castelo	Portugal	
7 February	Beachy Head	Point-class sealift ship	Flensburger Schiffbau-Gesellschaft	Flensburg	Germany	For British Armed Forces
28 February	Mariner of the Seas	Voyager-class cruise ship	Kvaerner Masa-Yards	Turku	Finland	For Royal Caribbean International
3 March	Rickmers New Orleans	type Superflex Heavy MPC container ship	Xiamen Shipbuilding Industry	Xiamen	China	For Rickmers Group
8 March	OOCL Long Beach	OOCL SX-class container ship	Geoje	Samsung Heavy Industries	South Korea	For Orient Overseas Container Line
21 March	Queen Mary 2	Ocean liner	Chantiers de l'Atlantique	St. Nazaire	France	For Cunard Line
21 March	Kedah	Kedah-class offshore patrol vessel	Blohm + Voss	Hamburg	Germany	
4 April	Anna Mærsk	Mærsk A-class container ship	Odense Staalskibsvaerft	Lindø	Denmark	For Maersk Line
12 April	MSC Viviana	Sealand-New-York-type container ship	Ulsan	Hyundai Heavy Industries	South Korea	For Freesia International Corporation
13 April	Maersk Kalamata	Sealand-New-York-type container ship	Ulsan	Hyundai Heavy Industries	South Korea	For Costamare Shipping
18 April	Shivalik	Shivalik-class frigate	Mazagon Dock Limited	Mumbai	India	
19 April	Evertsen	De Zeven Provinciën-class frigate	Koninklijke Schelde Groep	Flushing	Netherlands	
29 April	Lanzhou	Type 052C air defense destroyer	Jiangnan Shipyard	Shanghai	China	
3 May	Coruisk	Ferry	Appledore Shipbuilders	Appledore, North Devon	United Kingdom	For Caledonian MacBrayne
16 May	Toowoomba	Anzac-class frigate	Tenix Defence Systems	Williamstown, Victoria	Australia	
16 May	Blas de Lezo	Álvaro de Bazán-class frigate	Navatia	Ferrol	Spain	For Armada Española
23 May	Olga Mærsk	Olga Mærsk-Class container ship	Maersk Line	Kerteminde, Denmark	Denmark	For Maersk Line
6 June	Götheborg	East Indiaman Replica	Terra Nova	Gothenburg	Sweden	For Svenska Ostindiska Companiet AB
14 June	HMS Mersey	River-class patrol vessel	VT Group	Southampton	Great Britain	For Royal Navy
16 June	Rickmers Jakarta	type Superflex Heavy MPC container ship	Xiamen Shipbuilding Industry	Xiamen	China	For Rickmers Group
20 June	Serenade of the Seas	Radiance-class cruise ship	Meyer Werft	Papenburg	Germany	For Royal Caribbean International
25 June	James E. Williams	Arleigh Burke-class destroyer	Ingalls Shipbuilding	Pascagoula, Mississippi	United States	
3 July	Arnold Mærsk	Mærsk A-class container ship	Odense Staalskibsvaerft	Lindø	Denmark	For Maersk Line
12 July	San Antonio	San Antonio-class amphibious transport dock	Avondale Shipyard	Avondale, Louisiana	United States	
18 July	Largs Bay	Bay-class landing ship dock	Swan Hunter	Wallsend, England	United Kingdom	
19 July	Momsen	Arleigh Burke-class destroyer	Bath Iron Works	Bath, Maine	United States	
26 July	Hessen	Sachsen-class frigate	Nordseewerke	Emden	Germany	
2 August	Spioenkop	Valour-class frigate	Howaldtswerke-Deutsche Werft	Kiel	Germany	For South African Navy
16 August	Virginia	Virginia-class submarine	Electric Boat	Groton, Connecticut	United States	For US Navy
16 August	Adriana Star	Type Hyundai 2530 TEU container ship	Hyundai Heavy Industries	Ulsan	South Korea	
29 August	Sazanami	Takanami-class destroyer			Japan	
31 August	Rio Alexander		Estaleiros Navais de Viana do Castelo	Viana do Castelo	Portugal	
13 September	Lana	Motor yacht	Appledore Shipbuilders Ltd.	Appledore	United Kingdom	For private owner.
22 September	Stina	Sietas type 168 container ship	Schiffswerft J.J. Sietas	Hamburg-Neuenfelde	Germany	For Jan Breuer
24 September	Suardiaz Galicia	Ro-ro cargo ship	Hijos de J. Barreras	Vigo	Spain	For Suardiaz
1 October	Annette	Sietas type 161	J.J. Sietas	Hamburg-Neuenfelde	Germany	For SAL Heavy Lift
1 October	Maria	Sietas type 161	J.J. Sietas	Hamburg-Neuenfelde	Germany	For SAL Heavy Lift
1 October	Takashio	Oyashio-class submarine			Japan	
2 October	Pahang	Kedah-class offshore patrol vessel	HDW	Kiel	Germany	
2 October	MSC Marina	Sealand-New-York-type container ship	Ulsan	Hyundai Heavy Industries	South Korea	
8 October	Arthur Mærsk	Mærsk A-class container ship	Odense Staalskibsvaerft	Lindø	Denmark	For Maersk Line
16 October	Victoria I	Cruiseferry	Aker Finnyards	Rauma, Finland	Finland	For Tallink
23 October	O’Higgins	Scorpène-class submarine	Direction des Constructions Navales	Cherbourg	France	For Armada de Chile
30 October	Haikou	Type 052C air defense destroyer	Jiangnan Shipyard	Shanghai	China	
6 November	Salvatore Todaro	Type 212 submarine	Fincantieri	Muggiano	Italy	For Italian Navy
November	U 32	Type 212 submarine	Nordseewerke	Emden	Germany	For German Navy
27 December	OOCL Qingdao	OOCL SX-class container ship	Geoje	Samsung Heavy Industries	South Korea	For Orient Overseas Container Line
Date unknown	Mayflower Resolution	Turbine Installation Vessel	Shanhaiguan Shipyard	Qinhuangdao	China	For Mayflower Energy Ltd
Date unknown	Mastera	Crude oil tanker	Sumitomo Heavy Industries	Yokosuka, Japan	Japan	
