= Kedah-class offshore patrol vessel =

Ship class of the Royal Malaysian Navy

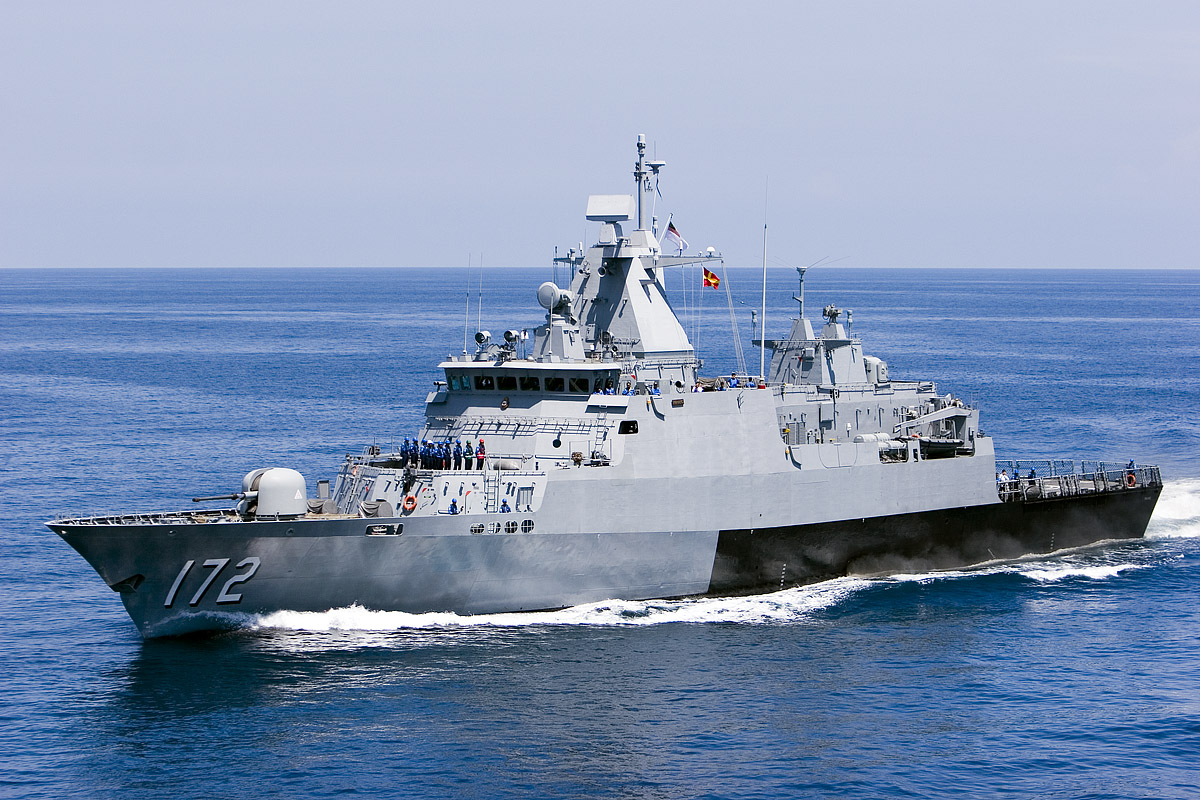
- KD Pahang (F172)

Class overview
- Name: Kedah class
- Builders: Blohm + Voss/HDW, German Naval Group (GNG); Boustead Heavy Industries Corporation (Formerly PSC-Naval Dockyard)
- Operators: Royal Malaysian Navy
- Preceded by: Vosper PC (31 Meter Patrol Craft)
- Succeeded by: Keris class
- Planned: 27
- Completed: 6
- Canceled: 21
- Active: 6

General characteristics
- Type: MEKO 100 RMN offshore patrol vessel
- Displacement: 1,850 tons full load
- Length: 91.1 m (299 ft)
- Beam: 12.85 m (42.2 ft)
- Draught: 3.4 m (11 ft)
- Installed power: 16,000 bhp
- Propulsion: Main propulsion: 2x Caterpillar 3616 (5,450kW) diesel, 2 shafts, 2 controllable pitch propellers
- Speed: 24 knots (44 km/h; 28 mph)
- Range: 6,050 nautical miles (11,200 km; 6,960 mi)
- Endurance: 21 days
- Complement: 78 (accom. for 98)
- Sensors & processing systems: Combat system: Atlas Elektronik COSYS-110 M1/ARGOS; Integrated platform management system: CAE; Search radar: EADS TRS-3D/ 16ES PESA radar; Fire control radar: Oerlikon Contraves TMX/EO X-band with electro-optic fire director; Thermal imager: Rheinmetall TMEO; Sonar: L-3 ELAC Nautik NDS-3060 Obstacle Avoidance sonar; IFF system: Aeromaritime
- Electronic warfare & decoys: ESM: Thales Sceptre-X, Teleydnye Phobos (2024 onwards); Decoy: Sippican ALEX/SRBOC chaff / decoy launching system
- Armament: 1 × 76 mm Oto Melara; 1 × 30 mm Breda-Mauser
- Aircraft carried: 1 x Super Lynx 300
- Aviation facilities: Stern hangar; Helicopter landing platform

The Kedah-class offshore patrol vessels of the Royal Malaysian Navy (RMN) are six ships based on the MEKO 100 design by Blohm + Voss. Originally, a total of 27 ships were planned, but due to programme delays and overruns, only six were eventually ordered. Their construction began in the early 2000s, and by 2009, all six were in active service. The six vessels are named after Malaysian states.

== Classification ==
While their size and tonnage implies the Kedah-class ships to be corvettes, they are classified as offshore patrol vessels (OPVs) by the Royal Malaysian Navy, a category more common with law enforcement or coast guard vessels, not naval warships. This is rooted in the fact that the Kedah class was delivered in a condition named for but not with, meaning that certain weapon systems were not included in the original purchase, but all provisions to install and use them, including sensors and electronics, are already present in the ships. The weapons themselves can be easily "plugged in" with little delay as soon as the Royal Malaysian Navy has purchased them. These purchases however have not yet been made. Currently, the Kedah-class vessels are armed with guns only (76 mm gun on the bow, 30 mm gun on the aft), making them quite lightly armed and fairly vulnerable for naval ships of their size, thus justifying their listing as OPVs rather than proper corvettes.

== Development ==
In the 1990s, the Royal Malaysian Navy identified the need to replace their ageing patrol boats. These 31 m long vessels built by Vosper Ltd with a displacement of 96 tons had been in service since the 1960s. After receiving government approval, the Royal Malaysian Navy ran a competition for the design in 1996, planning to purchase 27 vessels over 15 years. The specifications aimed for a design with a displacement of 1,300 tons and an overall length of 80 m. It was already noted at that time that this resembled full-fledged corvettes rather than patrol vessels, but the eventual winning bid would turn out to be even larger. The Australian bid proposed a Joint Patrol Vessel, to be designed by Australian Transfield Shipbuilding and subsequently purchased by the Royal Malaysian Navy as well as the Royal Australian Navy. Other contenders were the German Naval Group consortium as well as British shipyards Vosper Thornycroft and Yarrow Shipbuilders.

In October 1997, the German Naval Group consortium, headed by Blohm + Voss, was declared the winner with their design based on the modular MEKO family of warships, and a contract for six vessels was signed by the Royal Malaysian Navy and PSC-Naval Dockyard on 5 September 1998, with a unit cost of 270 million dollar per vessel.

== Progress delay ==
The shipbuilding has been plagued by financial and technical problems and delays. The first setback occurred when the first hull completed by PSC-Naval Dockyard failed to pass pre-delivery sea trials due to technical problems and quality issues. The crisis continued until the Malaysian government replaced the management team. The programme resumed, but the scandal discouraged the Malaysian Government from further investments.

In June 2006, after a total of 18 months of delays, the Royal Malaysian Navy commissioned KD Kedah, followed by a second hull, KD Pahang in August of the same year, and a third hull, KD Perak on 12 November 2007. By July 2009, six vessels had been launched.

== Characteristics ==
The Kedah class is based on the MEKO 100 corvette. It is designed to have low radar detectability, low noise, low heat dissipation, and have an economical cruising speed. The main radar, TRS-3D/16-ES is a fully coherent multi-mode phased array C-band radar capable of fully automatic detection, track initiation, and classification of various types of targets. It is capable to track 400 air and surface targets with the detection range up to 200 km and the corresponding update times between 1 and 6 seconds. An advanced control system known as Integrated Platform Management System (IPMS) is used to monitor and control the platform machinery of the ships, including propulsion, electrical, damage control, and auxiliary machinery and systems.

Due to the small ship complement, the design relies on a high degree of automation for improved operational effectiveness and survivability of the ships. The design uses intelligent electronics and sensors interconnected by data buses. This enables monitoring and control of machinery from several shipboard locations. The ship has redundant systems to improve survivability.

All Kedah-class vessels are fitted for but not with the RIM-116 Rolling Airframe Missile (RAM) surface-to-air missile and the Exocet MM40 Block 2 anti-ship missile. It also can fitted with BrahMos cruise missile if it was purchased. Once the weapons themselves were purchased, it would reportedly take only one day for them to be installed, after which they could be immediately used with full functionality.

== Improved design and next order ==
In Defence Services Asia 2018 (DSA 2018) BHIC unveiled the new improved design of the Kedah-class to fulfill the Royal Malaysian Navy modernization program, 15 to 5 program. Under this program 12 more Kedah-class will be order to complement the six existing Kedah-class makes the total of 18 Kedah-class will be in service with Royal Malaysian Navy. The design incorporated improvement in stealth design where the ships will have low radar cross section then before. This new design also modular where the end user can choose whether to armed this ships with guns only or to fitted for but not with missiles and torpedo.

== Major operation ==
KD Pahang involved in Anti-piracy measures in Somalia in 2008.

KD Perak involved in naval blockade in 2013 Lahad Datu standoff.

== Ships of the class ==
All ships of the class were named after states in Peninsular Malaysia.

Pennant	Name	Builders	Laid down	Launched	Commissioned	Division/Squadron
F171	KD Kedah	Blohm + Voss	13 November 2001	21 March 2003	5 June 2006	17th PV Squadron
F172	KD Pahang	HDW	21 December 2001	2 October 2003	3 August 2006	17th PV Squadron
F173	KD Perak	Boustead Heavy Industries Corporation (BHIC)	March 2002	12 November 2007	3 June 2009	17th PV Squadron
F174	KD Terengganu	Boustead Heavy Industries Corporation (BHIC)	August 2004	6 December 2007	8 December 2009	17th PV Squadron
F175	KD Kelantan	Boustead Heavy Industries Corporation (BHIC)	July 2005	24 November 2008	8 May 2010	17th PV Squadron
F176	KD Selangor	Boustead Heavy Industries Corporation (BHIC)	July 2006	23 July 2009	28 December 2010	17th PV Squadron

== Gallery ==
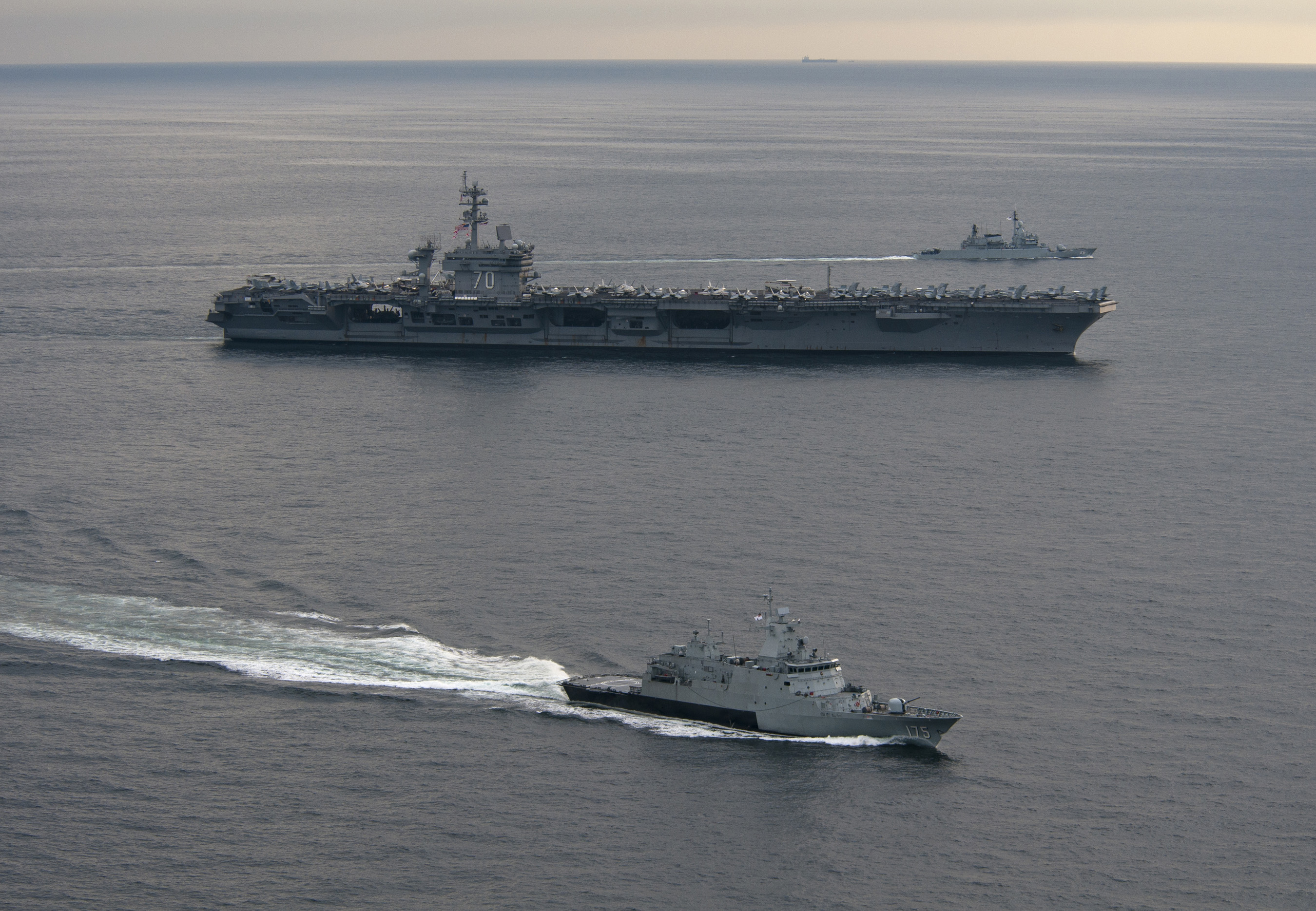
KD Kelantan (fore) with USS Carl Vinson and Kasturi-class corvette KD Lekir.

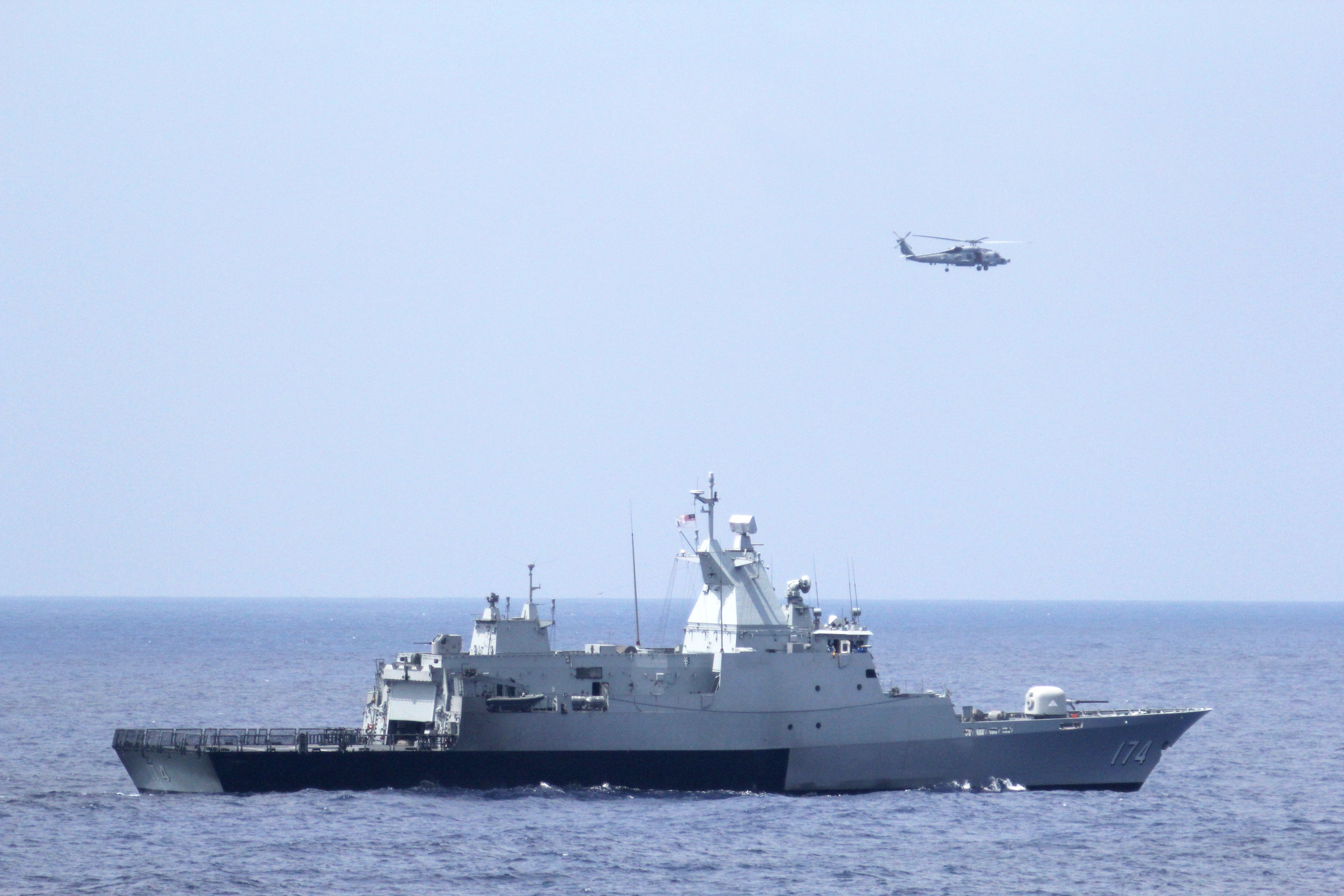
KD Terengganu on the seas.

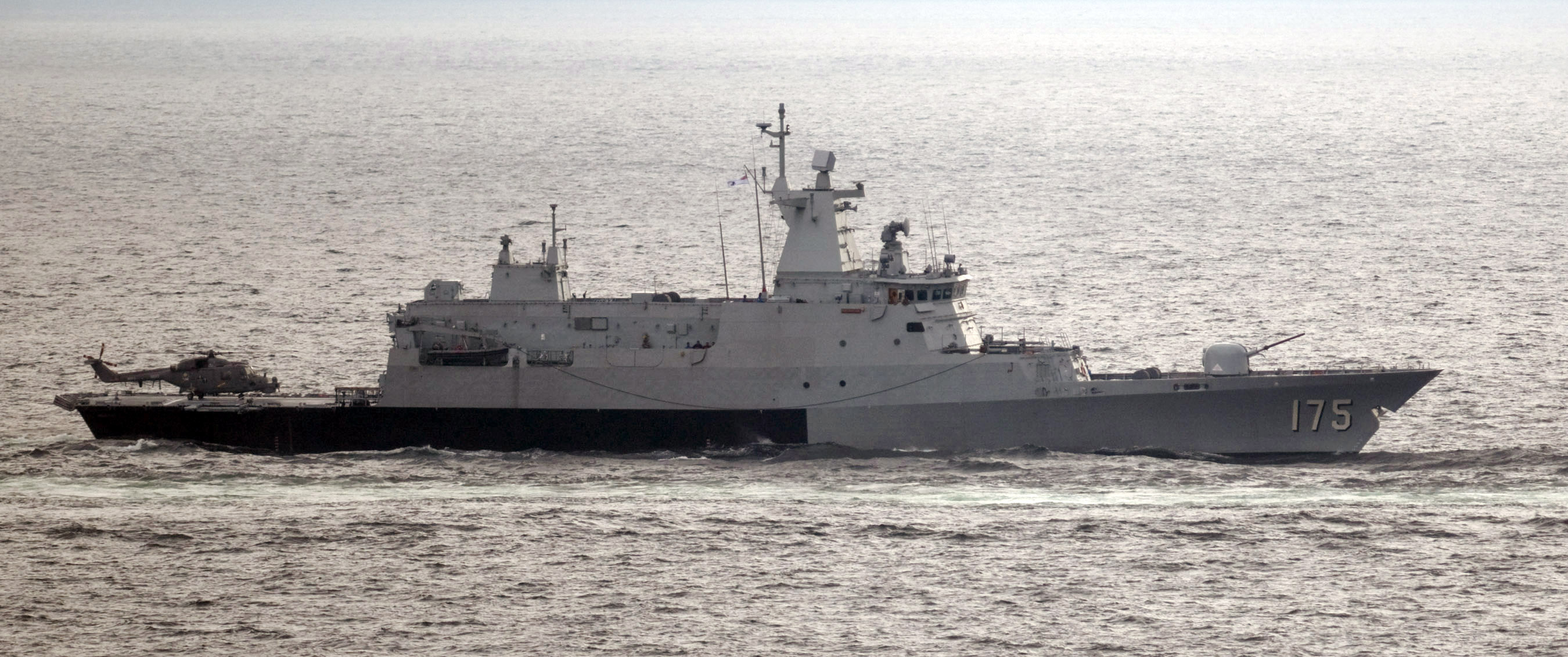
KD Kelantan with Super Lynx ASW helicopter.

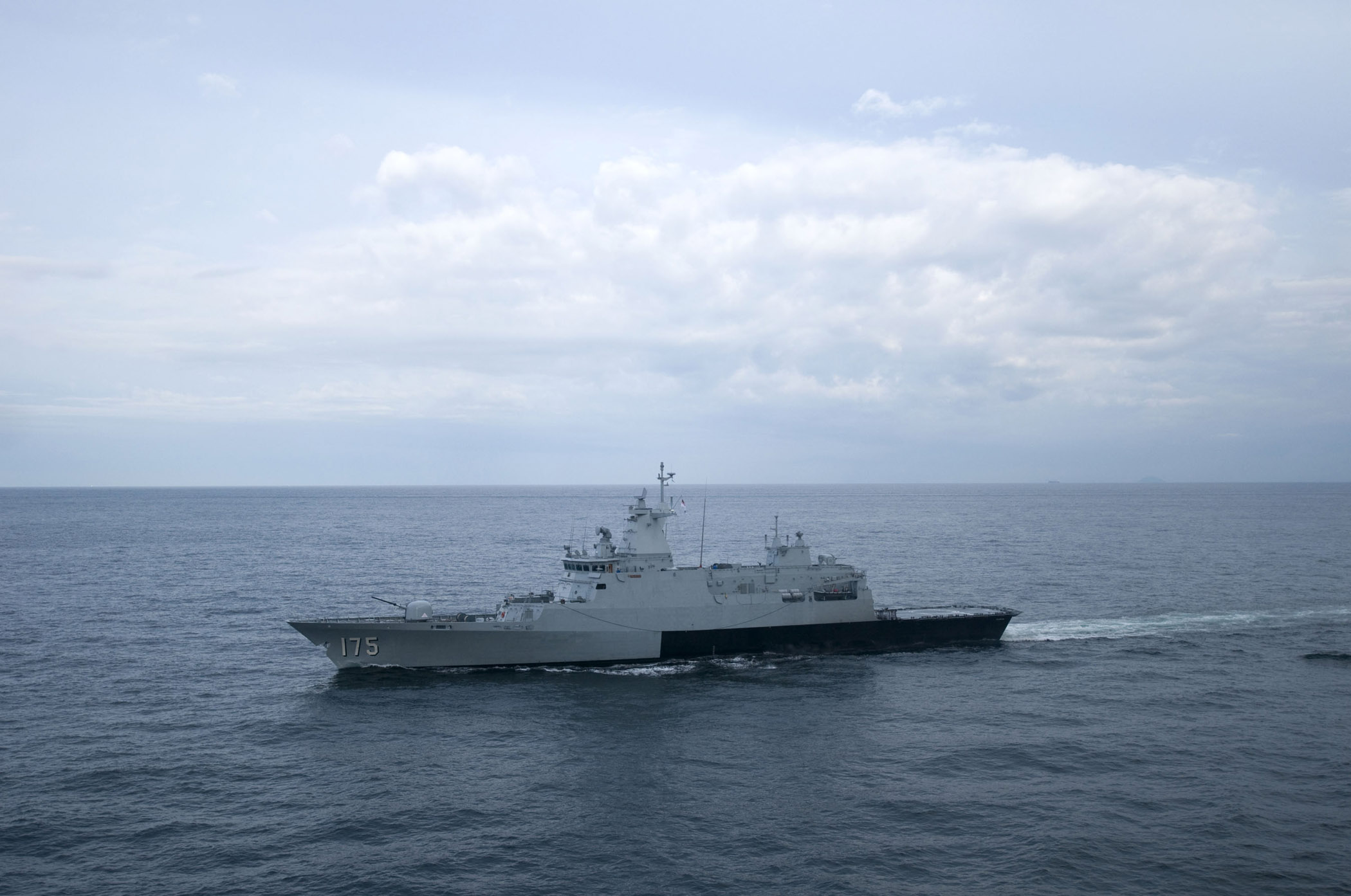
KD Kelantan on the seas.

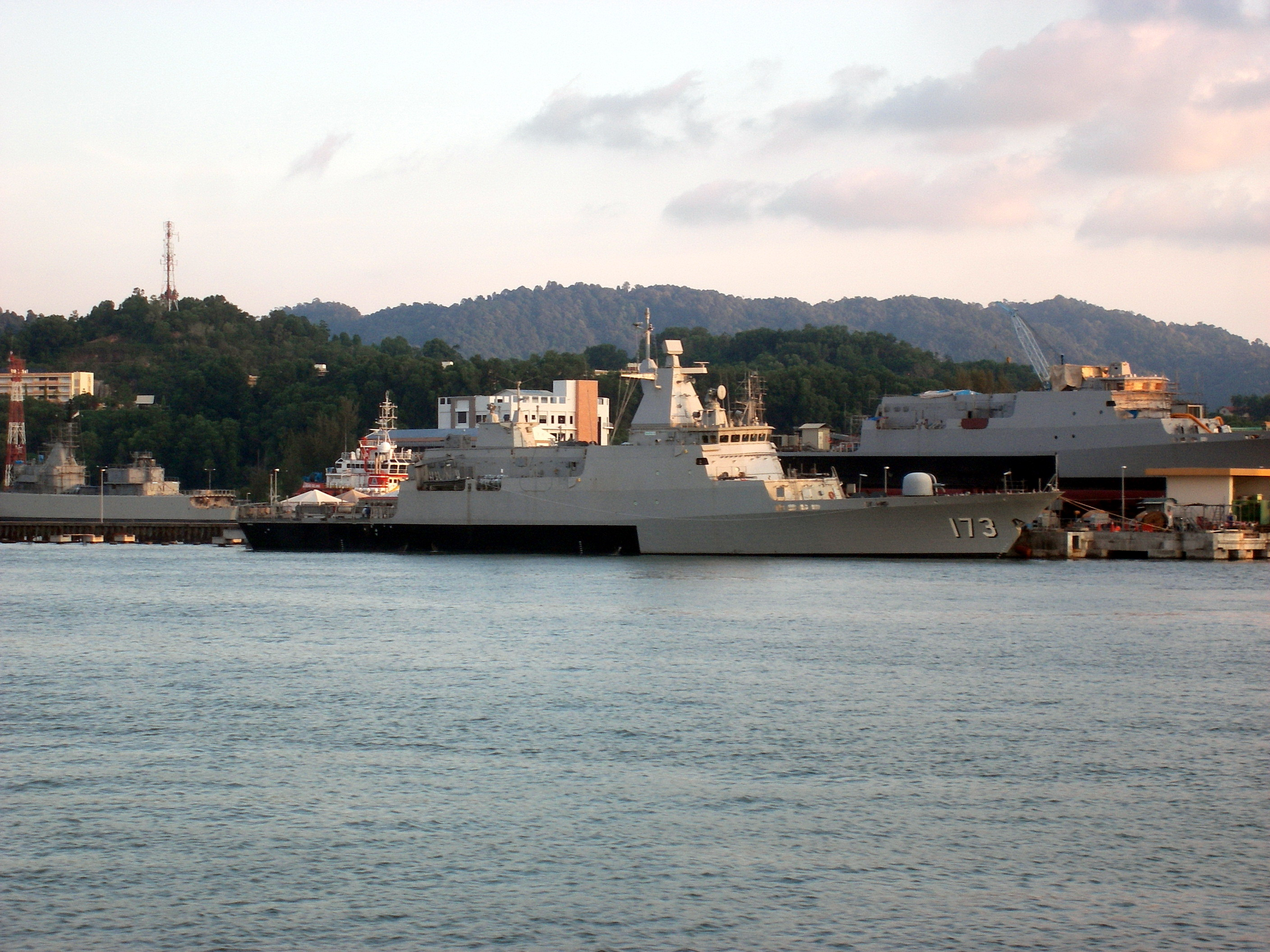
KD Perak at Boustead Naval Shipyard before the handing over to the Royal Malaysian Navy.

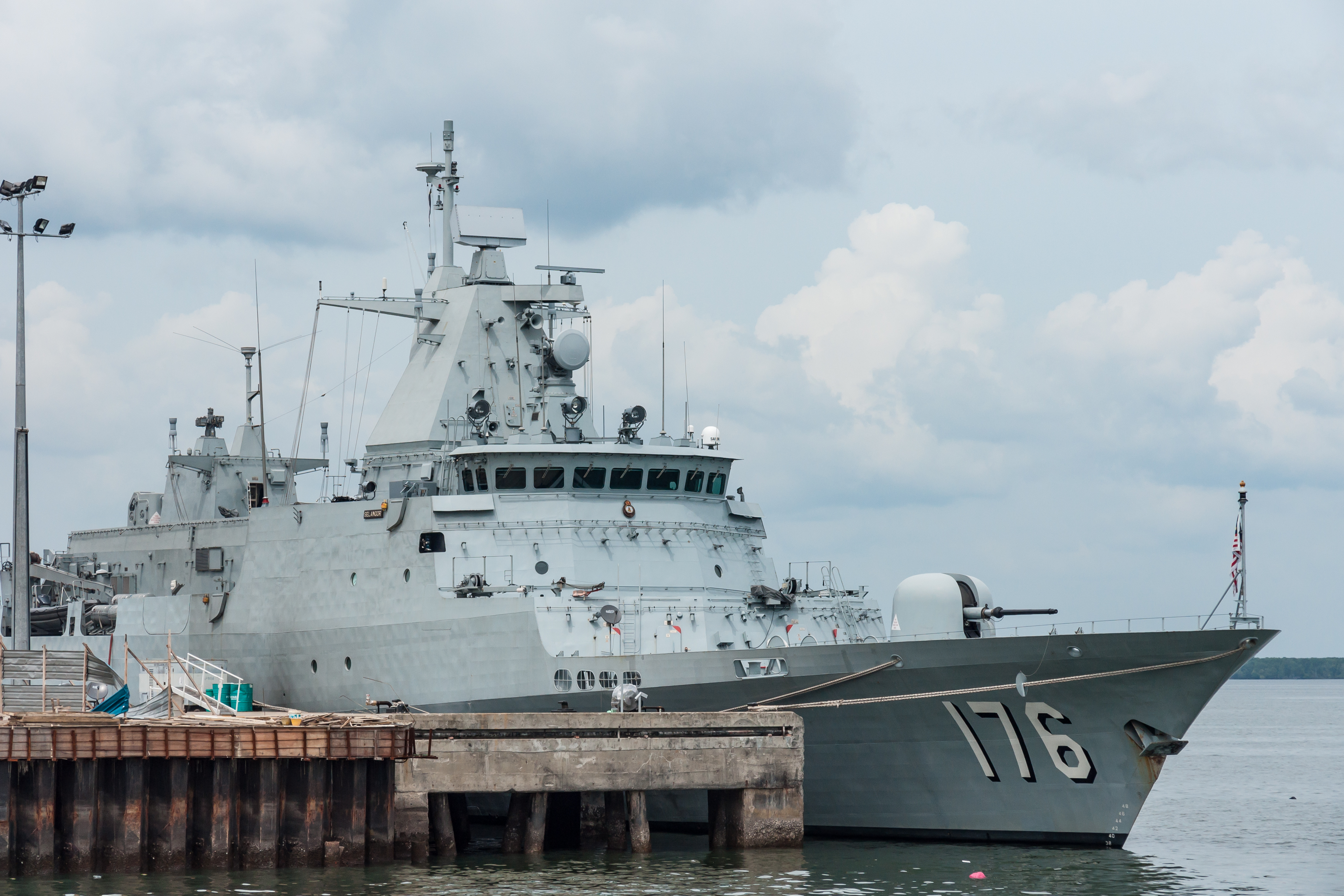
KD Selangor at Sandakan, Sabah.

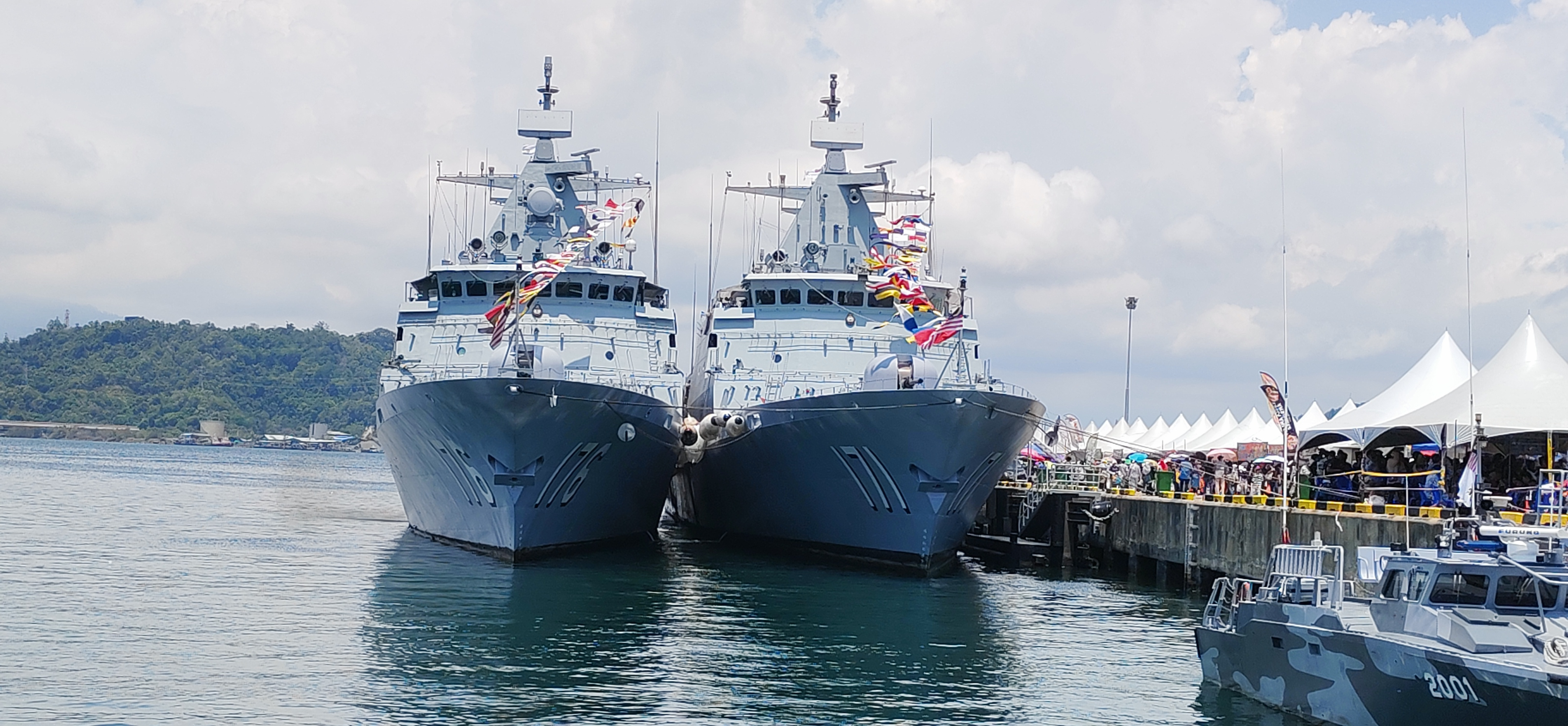
KD Kedah (left) and KD Selangor (right) side-by-side at Sepanggar during Hari Terbuka Armada in May 2026.

== See also ==
- Braunschweig-class corvette – A German Navy ship class based on the same MEKO 100 design.
- List of naval ship classes in service
