= PSC-Naval Dockyard =

Malaysian maritime company

- Company type: Private Limited Company
- Industry: Shipbuilding; Defence
- Founded: 1995
- Defunct: 2005
- Headquarters: Lumut, Malaysia

Penang Shipbuilding and Construction - Naval Dockyard Sdn Bhd (PSC-ND), was a division of the Penang Shipbuilding and Construction Industries Bhd (PCSI), a Malaysian shipbuilding company based in Lumut, Perak, Malaysia. The company's primary role is to maintain the Royal Malaysian Navy (RMN) fleet. However, a management and financial crisis in 2005 result the Malaysian Government to enforced the PSC-ND to be taken over by Boustead Heavy Industries Corporation and renamed as Boustead Naval Shipyard Sdn Bhd.

== Background ==
PSC - Naval Dockyard was born out of the Royal Malaysian Navy’s dockyard facilities which was to provide ship repairs and maintenance services. Under the corporatisation program advocated by the Malaysian Government, the dockyard was corporatised as Royal Malaysia Navy Dockyard, a wholly owned government company. It has modern facilities to meet the total maintenance requirements of the Royal Malaysian Navy fleet, from hull repairs to major overhauls and from radar refitting to weapon systems refurbishment.

The company was taken over by Penang Shipbuilding Corporation Berhad, a company in the stable of entrepreneur Amin Shah Omar Shah, now declared a bankrupt, and renamed PSC - Naval Dockyard Sdn Bhd to reflect the corporate relationship with Penang Shipbuilding Corporation.

In 2005, Public Accounts Committee (PAC) unveiled serious corruption in the PCS-ND and caused solemn concern from the public. Under pressure of the public, Malaysian government enforced a reorganize result the PCS-ND to be taken over by Boustead Heavy Industries Corporation and renamed as Boustead Naval Shipyard Sdn Bhd.

== New Generation Patrol Vessels (NGPV) contract ==
PSC - Naval Dockyard Sdn Bhd was made the major contractor for the building and delivery of the New Generation Patrol Vessels (NGPV) for the Royal Malaysian Navy (RMN). An international invitation for bids was invited, from Germany, the United States, Australian and Britain amongst others submitting their bids. PSC-ND was set to join venture with the winner to complete the program.

The German Naval Group (GNG) with their proposed model, based on the Blohm + Voss MEKO 100 design, won the bid. A contract was signed on 13 October 1998 for an initial six units, with the GNG as the major sub-contractor. Member of the GNG, the Hamburg-based Blohm + Voss was to build the first two ships, while the PSC-ND was to complete the final fitting out and trials. The remaining ships were to be built at the PSC-Naval Dockyard from ship modules supplied by the GNG, with a gradual increase of local content.

The contract also involved technology transfer to PSC-ND from German side as well as to specified a local content of not less than 30 percent, and an offset program of not less than 30% of the contract value. The German Naval Group is also to make a counter purchase obligation amounting to 11% of the contract value. The class of ship has now been classified as the Kedah Class Offshore Patrol Vessel. As of early 2008, four vessels were delivered to the navy.

== Financial and delivery problems ==
In 2005, the Public Accounts Committee (PAC) brought up the public attention after unveiled serious corruption in the PSC-ND management and particular failed to meet the due date of the first NGPV vessel. Local media revealed that the construction of the remaining vessels was also delayed due to financial difficulties in the PSC-Naval Dockyard. Reports of nonpayment to some 40 sub contractors who were owed RM180 million was met by surprise. PSC-ND also failed to remit some RM4 million in contributions to the Employees Provident Fund (EPF), the Inland Revenue Board and the National Co-operative Organisation despite having made salary deductions from its 1,500 staff. PSC-ND has also reportedly sought another advance of 1.8 billion ringgit from the government to complete the vessels.

The PAC claimed that RM120mil would be needed to salvage the first two OPV vessels, and that the Government also needed to pump in at least RM80mil to pay off local vendors, suppliers and contractors. This led the NGPV program into crisis.

Under the intervention of Malaysian Government, a new management team was put in place and the project was revived. The Boustead Heavy Industries Corporation, took up 37% of stake and became the single largest shareholder of PSCI. As a division of PSCI, PSC-ND therefore taken over by Boustead Heavy Industries Corporation and renamed as Boustead Naval Shipyard Sdn Bhd.

The two vessels were eventually delivered and accepted by the Royal Malaysian Navy in 2006, a delay of some 18 months. The two new ships, KD Kedah and KD Pahang were commissioned in June and August 2006 respectively.

== Submarines ==
Rotterdamsche Droogdok Maatschappij (RDM) appointed PSC Naval Dockyard as their partner and ambitiously brought two former Royal Netherlands Navy submarines Tijgerhaai and Zwaardvis in anticipation of the Royal Malaysian Navy’s planned purchase of submarines. The two submarines were to have been refurbished and used as training submarines while the new submarines are built in the Netherlands.

The submarines are owned by Rotterdamsche Droogdok Maatschappij, while PSC Naval Dockyard was to be the prime partner for the program. Many thought the 2 vessels had been purchased by the Royal Malaysian Navy but this was not the case. Among RDM's competitors in the submarine project were Kockums whose submarines are used by Singapore, DCN International and another German company that offered Type 209 submarines. DCN International won the bid with the proposal to supply diesel-powered Scorpène-class and an Agosta-class submarine for training.
