= MHS Aviation =

Charter airline of Malaysia

MHS Aviation Berhad
- Founded: 1983; 43 years ago
- Operating bases: Kuala Lumpur–Subang; Labuan; Miri
- Parent company: Boustead Holdings Berhad
- Headquarters: D-26-G, Pusat Komersial Arena Bintang No. 3, Jalan Zuhal U5/179, Seksyen U5 40150 Shah Alam, Selangor, Malaysia
- Key people: Mohd Fakhrul Arifin bin Adinan (CEO)
- Website: www.mhsaviation.com

MHS Aviation Berhad (formerly Malaysian Helicopter Services) is a charter airline company based in Malaysia. Its operations are mainly in the oil and gas industry, where their helicopters transport personnel to offshore rigs. Its main clients are Petronas, Shell, ExxonMobil and others. Other than Malaysia, they also operate overseas, such as Mauritania, Syria and Timor Leste. They are the largest company in the offshore oil and gas helicopter market in Malaysia, having a 70% market share. MHS Aviation Berhad is a subsidiary of Boustead Holdings Berhad.

== Fleet ==
=== Current fleet ===
- 1 Beechcraft 1900D (as of August 2025)
- Eurocopter AS332 Super Puma (AS332L2)
- Airbus H175 B
- Airbus H135 P3H

=== Former fleet ===
- Sikorsky S-61
- Sikorsky S-76
