= Boustead Heavy Industries Corporation =

Malaysian shipyard company

Boustead Heavy Industries Corporation Berhad
- Type: Public limited company
- Traded as: MYX: 8133
- ISIN: MYL8133OO000
- Industry: Defence; Shipbuilding; Aerospace
- Founded: 2007; 19 years ago
- Headquarters: Kuala Lumpur, Malaysia
- Area served: South East Asia
- Key people: Feroz Razi Ramli (CEO)
- Products: Naval vessels Commercial vessels Offshore structures
- Services: Electronic and weapon systems Ship repair MRO of aircraft etc.
- Revenue: ▲RM 2.503 billion(end 2013) (US$760 million)
- Operating income: ▲RM -89 million(end 2013) (US$-27 million)
- Total assets: ▲RM 4.348 billion(end 2013) (US$1.33 billion)
- Number of employees: ▲2160
- Parent: Boustead Holdings
- Subsidiaries: See below: Boustead Penang Shipyard; BHIC Marines Carrier; BHIC Shipbuilding & Engineering; BHIC Navaltech; BHIC Marine Transport; BHIC Defence Technologies; BHIC Marine Technology Academy; BHIC Marine Ventures; Dominion Defence & Industries; Perstim Industries; Malaysia Heavy Industry Group; BHIC Allied Defence Technology; BHIC Submarine Engineering Services; BHIC Defence Techservices; BHIC Electronics & Technologies; BHIC Trading; BHIC Aerotech; BHIC Development; BHIC Asset Holding
- Website: www.bhic.com.my

Boustead Heavy Industries Corporation Berhad, (MYX: 8133) often abbreviated as BHIC is a Malaysian industrial group specialised in defence, naval and commercial shipbuilding, ship repair, fabrication of offshore structures as well as maintenance, repair and overhaul of aircraft. The company is a public limited company and the largest shareholder is Armed Forces Fund Board, a government statutory body which provides retirement benefits and a savings scheme for officers of the Malaysian Armed Forces, with a 58.69% stake. The second largest shareholder is Retirement Fund (Incorporated), a company created by the Malaysian Government as an investment company, with a stake of 7.17%.

== History ==
Boustead Heavy Industries Corporation (BHIC) was listed on Bursa Malaysia in 2007 and the parent company is Boustead Holdings. BHIC was known for its subsidiary Boustead Naval Shipyard (BNS) which is specialised in naval shipbuilding and ship repair. BNS now had taken over by Government and renamed as Lumut Naval Shipyard (LUNAS).

=== Take over of PSC-Naval Dockyard ===
==== Background ====
Penang Shipbuilding and Construction - Naval Dockyard Sdn Bhd (PSC-ND), was a division of the Penang Shipbuilding and Construction Industries Bhd (PCSI), a Malaysian Government-Linked Company (GLC), based in Lumut, Perak, Malaysia. The company's primary role was to maintain the Royal Malaysian Navy (RMN) fleet and the Lumut Naval Dockyard.

PSC - Naval Dockyard was born out of the Royal Malaysian Navy's dockyard facilities which was built to provide ship repairs and maintenance services. Under the corporatisation program advocated by the Malaysian Government, the dockyard was corporatised as Limbungan TLDM, a wholly owned government company. It had modern facilities to meet the total maintenance requirements of the Royal Malaysian Navy fleet, from hull repairs to major overhauls and from radar refitting to weapon systems refurbishment.

The company was taken over by the public listed Penang Shipbuilding Corporation Berhad, a company in the stable of the now bankrupt Amin Shah Omar Shah, and renamed PSC - Naval Dockyard Sdn Bhd to reflect the corporate relationship with Penang Shipbuilding Corporation.

In 2005, Public Accounts Committee (PAC) unveiled serious corruption in the PSC-ND and caused solemn concern from the public. Under pressure of the public, Malaysian government enforced a reorganization resulting in the forming of Boustead Heavy Industries.

==== New Generation Patrol Vessels contract ====
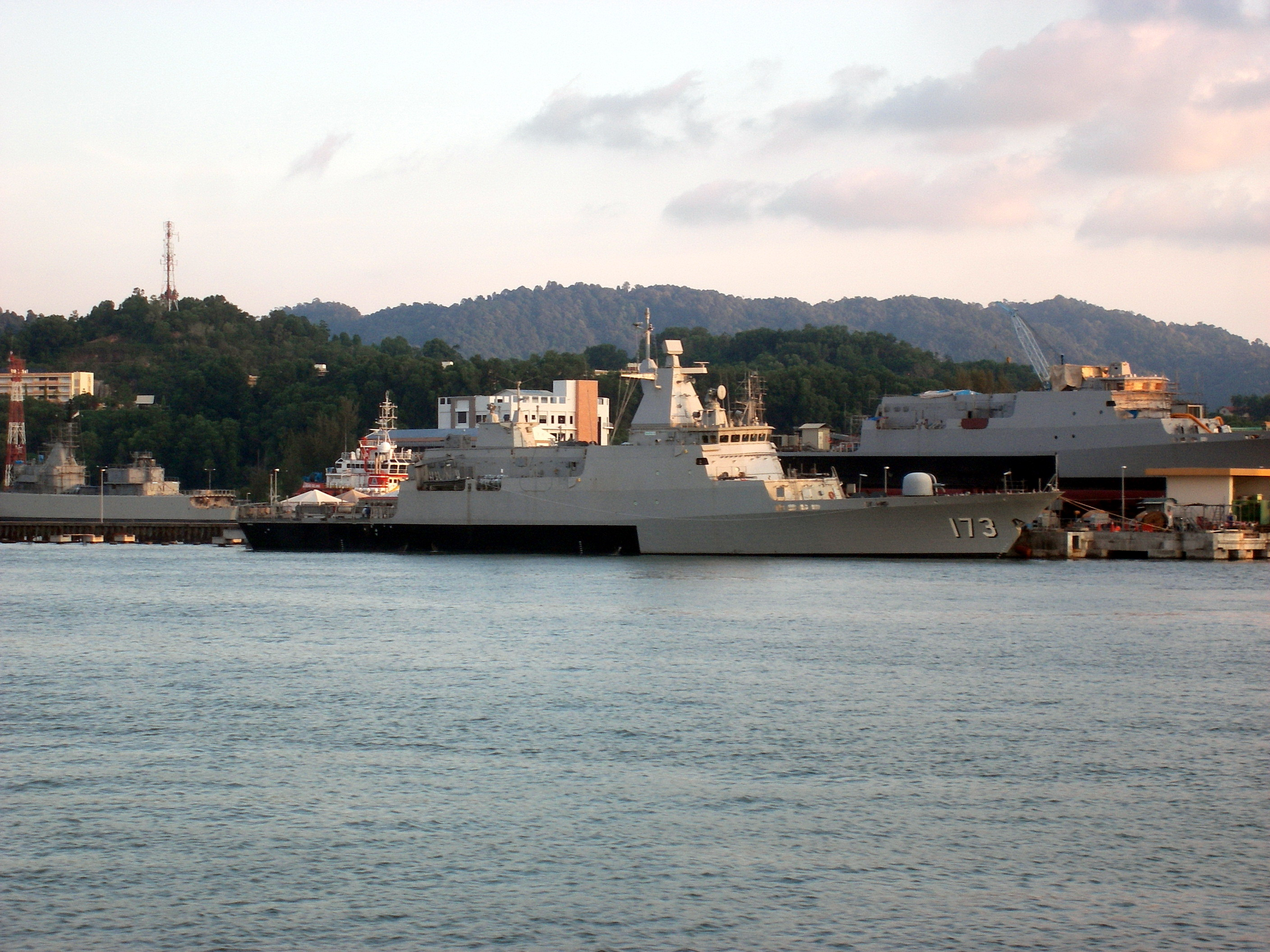
NGPV during her construction in Boustead Naval Shipyard

PSC - Naval Dockyard Sdn Bhd was made the major contractor for the building and delivery of the New Generation Patrol Vessels (NGPV) programme for the Royal Malaysian Navy. An international tender for bids was announced, with Germany, the United States, Australia and United Kingdom amongst others submitting their bids. PSC-ND was set to joint venture with the winner to complete the program.

The German Naval Group (GNG) with their proposed model, based on the Blohm + Voss MEKO 100 design, won the bid. A contract was signed on 13 October 1998 for an initial six units, with the GNG as the major sub-contractor. A member of the GNG, the Hamburg-based Blohm + Voss was to build the first two ships, while PSC-ND was to complete the final fitting out and trials. The remaining ships were to be built at the PSC-Naval Dockyard from ship modules supplied by the GNG, with a gradual increase of local content.

The contract also involved technology transfer to PSC-ND from GNG as well as a specified a local content of not less than 30 percent, and an offset programme of not less than 30% of the contract value. The German Naval Group was also to make a counter purchase obligation amounting to 11% of the contract value. The class of ship is now been classified as the Kedah Class Offshore Patrol Vessel. As of 2010, all 6 ships have been commissioned into the Royal Malaysian Navy.

==== Financial and delivery problems ====
In 2005, the Public Accounts Committee (PAC) brought up the public attention after they unveiled serious corruption in the PSC-ND management and also the failure to meet the delivery date of the first NGPV vessel. Local media revealed that the construction of the remaining vessels was also delayed due to financial difficulties in the PSC-Naval Dockyard. Reports of nonpayment to some 40 sub contractors who were owed RM180 million was met by shock from the public. PSC-ND also failed to pay some RM4 million in contributions to the Employees Provident Fund (EPF), the Inland Revenue Board and the National Co-operative Organisation despite having made salary deductions from its 1,500 staff. PSC-ND has also reportedly sought another grant of RM1.8 billion from the government to complete the vessels.

The PAC claimed that RM120 million would be needed to salvage the first two vessels, and that the Government also needed to pump in at least RM80 million to pay off unpaid local vendors, suppliers and contractors. This led the NGPV program into a crisis.

The Malaysian government then put in a new management team and the project was revived. Boustead Holdings Bhd, also a Government linked company, took up 37% of stake and became the single largest shareholder of Penang Shipbuilding and Construction Industries (PSCI). As a division of PSCI, PSC-ND was renamed Boustead Naval Shipyard Sdn Bhd and put under Boustead's defense company, Boustead Heavy Industries Corporation.

The first two vessels were eventually delivered and accepted by the Royal Malaysian Navy in 2006, after a delay of some 18 months.

=== Forming of BYO Marine ===
In 2009, Boustead Heavy Industries Corporation reached an agreement with Yonca-Onuk JV of Turkey, a well known interceptor craft manufacturer to set up a joint venture. Through this joint venture, BYO Marine was formed, named using the names of both companies involved. BYO Marine designs, builds, commissions and supplies high speed advanced composite boats to South East Asia and is supported by a team from Yonca-Onuk JV. BYO Marine supplies interceptor craft to the Malaysia Maritime Enforcement Agency (Malaysia Coast Guard) and offers missile equipped fast attack craft designed by Yonca-Onuk JV.

=== Acquisition of Contraves Advanced Devices ===
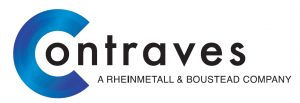
Contraves logo

In July 2010, Rheinmetall Defence of Düsseldorf, Germany, and Boustead Heavy Industries Corporation of Kuala Lumpur, Malaysia, entered a strategic agreement for the joint ownership of Contraves Advanced Devices Sdn Bhd located in Malacca. Under the joint agreement, Boustead Heavy Industries Corporation took up a 51% stake in the Rheinmetall subsidiary Contraves Advanced Devices effective 1 July 2010. Rheinmetall retained a 49% share in Contraves Advanced Devices and control of the operational management. Rheinmetall Defence and Boustead intended a further collaboration to serve new markets as well as enabling a technology transfer that would substantially benefit both Malaysian industry and the Malaysian Armed Forces. The partnership sought to foster the growth of high-tech production in Malaysia to strengthen the country's defence technology industrial base and open additional opportunities for exports.

=== Forming of Pyrotechnical Ordnance Malaysia ===
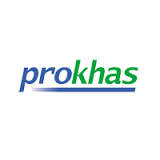
Prokhas logo

In May 2011, Boustead Heavy Industries Corporation expanded into the munitions industry when it signed a joint-venture deal with Prokhas Managers Sdn Bhd (PMSB), a Ministry of Finance (Malaysia) company to supply artillery propellants to the Malaysian Armed Forces. Under the joint venture, the new company, Pyrotechnical Ordnance Malaysia Sdn Bhd, would produce double base artillery propellants at a plant located on a 21-acre site in Bentong, Pahang. BHIC has invested RM58 million into the plant and the plant was expected to produce munitions by Q3 2012. BHIC owns a 49% stake in the company.

=== Acquisition of MHS Aviation ===
MHS Aviation logo

In June 2011, Boustead Heavy Industries Corporation expanded into the aviation industry by completing the acquisition of a 51% stake in MHS Aviation, Malaysia's largest helicopter service company, with 70% of the market value. The acquisition cost Boustead Heavy Industries RM100 million. MHS Aviation's principal activity is the provision of helicopter services to oil and gas companies such as Sarawak Shell Berhad, Esso Production Malaysia Inc. and Petronas Carigali Sdn Bhd. It is also the leading civilian supplier of aircraft charter, search & rescue, emergency medical services and providing training, engineering and technical services.

=== Sell of Boustead Naval Shipyard ===
In 2024, Boustead Heavy Industries Corporation sells Boustead Naval Shipyard to the Government through Ministry of Finance's company Ocean Sunshine. The company then rebranded as Lumut Naval Shipyard or LUNAS.

== Facilities and capabilities ==
=== Defence related businesses ===
==== Electronics division ====
Boustead Heavy Industries Corporation's electronics division started as an in-house repair and maintenance for the Royal Malaysian Navy fleet and has now evolved into an independent business centre which offers service to both government and private sectors. It is a one stop centre providing service, maintenance, repair and complete overhaul of naval and ground electronic equipments and systems, located at Lumut, Malaysia. It has been appointed as the Malaysian Service Centre for SAAB 9LV212 Weapon Control System and EADS / Hensoldt TRS-3D and TRML-3D Surveillance Radar used by the Malaysian Armed Forces.

==== Weaponry division ====
Boustead Heavy Industries Corporation weaponry division such as BHIC Allied Defence Technology Sdn Bhd, BHIC Defence Techservices Sdn Bhd, BHIC Marine Technology Academy Sdn Bhd, BHIC Bofors Asia Sdn Bhd, BHIC Navaltech Sdn Bhd and BHIC MSM Sdn Bhd offers services like repair, refurbishment and upgrade of terrestrial and naval weapon systems. It is also capable of refurbishment of armoured vehicles and various types of weapon system including decoy systems, torpedo systems, missiles and installing firing systems.

==== Manufacturing division ====
Boustead Heavy Industries Corporation's manufacturing capabilities come from its subsidiaries and joint ventures. The biggest manufacturing capability comes from Boustead Heavy Industries Corporation's subsidiary Contraves Advanced Devices. Contraves Advanced Devices is located in Malacca and Cyberjaya and consists of 250 skilled employees. The other manufacturers under Boustead Heavy Industries Corporation are Pyrotechnical Ordnance Malaysia, which operate a factory in Bentong and produce artillery propellant for the Malaysian Army as well as BYO Marine, which produces small boats for the region.

=== Shipbuilding ===
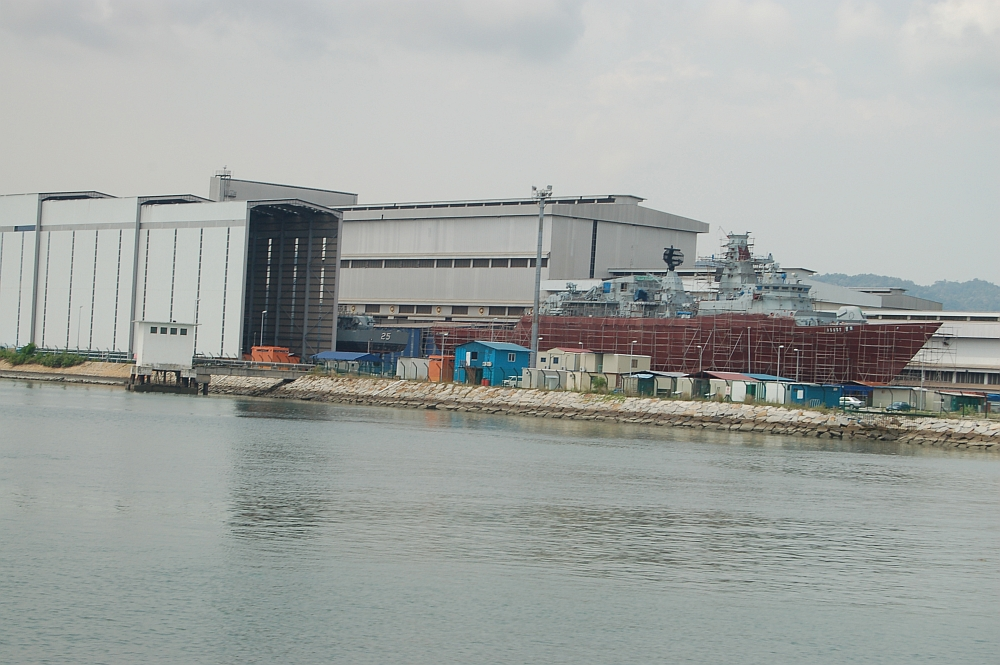
Naval shipbuilding at Boustead Naval Shipyard

The primary source of revenue for Boustead Heavy Industries Corporation is shipbuilding. Boustead Heavy Industries Corporation has three shipyards located in Malaysia, one of which is specialised in naval vessels while the other two are specialised in commercial vessels.

Boustead Naval Shipyard (now Lumut Naval Shipyard or LUNAS), specialising in naval vessels, is located near the Royal Malaysian Navy's headquarters at Lumut, Perak. The shipyard is 135 acres, significantly bigger than the other two shipyards. It has built 4 Kedah-class offshore patrol vessels in the past and is currently engaged in the building of 6 more Second Generation Patrol Vessels. The shipyard is being upgraded with the advice of DCNS to prepare for the SGPV project. The work includes new ship lifts, 2 new block assembly halls, 3 new halls for panel assembly and 3 keel lines so that around 2020 the shipyard will be able to assemble 3 SGPV hulls at the same time.

Boustead Penang Shipyard is located on Penang Island, Penang and is involved in the building of commercial vessels. The yard is 20.21 acres and the height is restricted to a certain height due to the Penang Second Bridge that was opened in 2014.

Boustead Langkawi Shipyard (now LUNAS Langkawi) is located on Langkawi, Kedah and specialises in building luxury yachts due to Langkawi's location as a tourist and entertainment hotspot.

=== Ship repair ===
Boustead Heavy Industries Corporation also offers ship repair in its shipyards and each shipyard serves a different market.

Boustead Naval Shipyard in Lumut specialises in the repair of naval vessels.

Boustead Penang Shipyard offers ship repair services to commercial vessels.

Boustead Langkawi Shipyard specialises in the repair of luxury vessels.

Boustead also owned a submarine repair facility in Sepanggar Naval Base of the Royal Malaysian Navy namely Boustead DCNS Naval Corporation Sdn Bhd and BHIC Submarine Engineering Services Sdn Bhd.

=== Heavy engineering / Prefabrication ===
Another primary source of revenue for Boustead Heavy Industries Corporation is heavy engineering / prefabrication.

Boustead Naval Shipyard fabricates container cranes and heavy steel structures for the oil and gas industry.

Boustead Penang Shipyard is the most active shipyard for heavy engineering / prefabrication, offering fabrication for heavy steel structures and platforms as well as oil and gas fabrication like oil platforms.

Boustead Langkawi Shipyard does not have prefabrication facilities.

=== Aerospace ===
Boustead Heavy Industries Corporation also engaged in aerospace sector mainly in maintenance, repair and overhaul and airline service. Through BHIC AeroServices Sdn Bhd, the company responsible for the maintenance and supply of spare parts for the Royal Malaysian Air Force (RMAF) Eurocopter EC725 helicopter fleet. In addition, the company also set up a joint venture with Airbus for the maintenance, repair and overhaul of the Airbus A400M airlifter in service with RMAF.

BHIC also owned Airbus Helicopters Simulation Center Sdn Bhd operates a flight training center with simulator and offers aviation training programs at its center in Subang Aeropolis, Selangor.

In airline service, Boustead Heavy Industries Corporation's aviation division primarily comes from 51% owned MHS Aviation. It is Malaysia's largest civil helicopter operator, controlling 70% of the market share and is mostly involved in offshore oil and gas transport.

== Products ==
=== SGPV Program ===
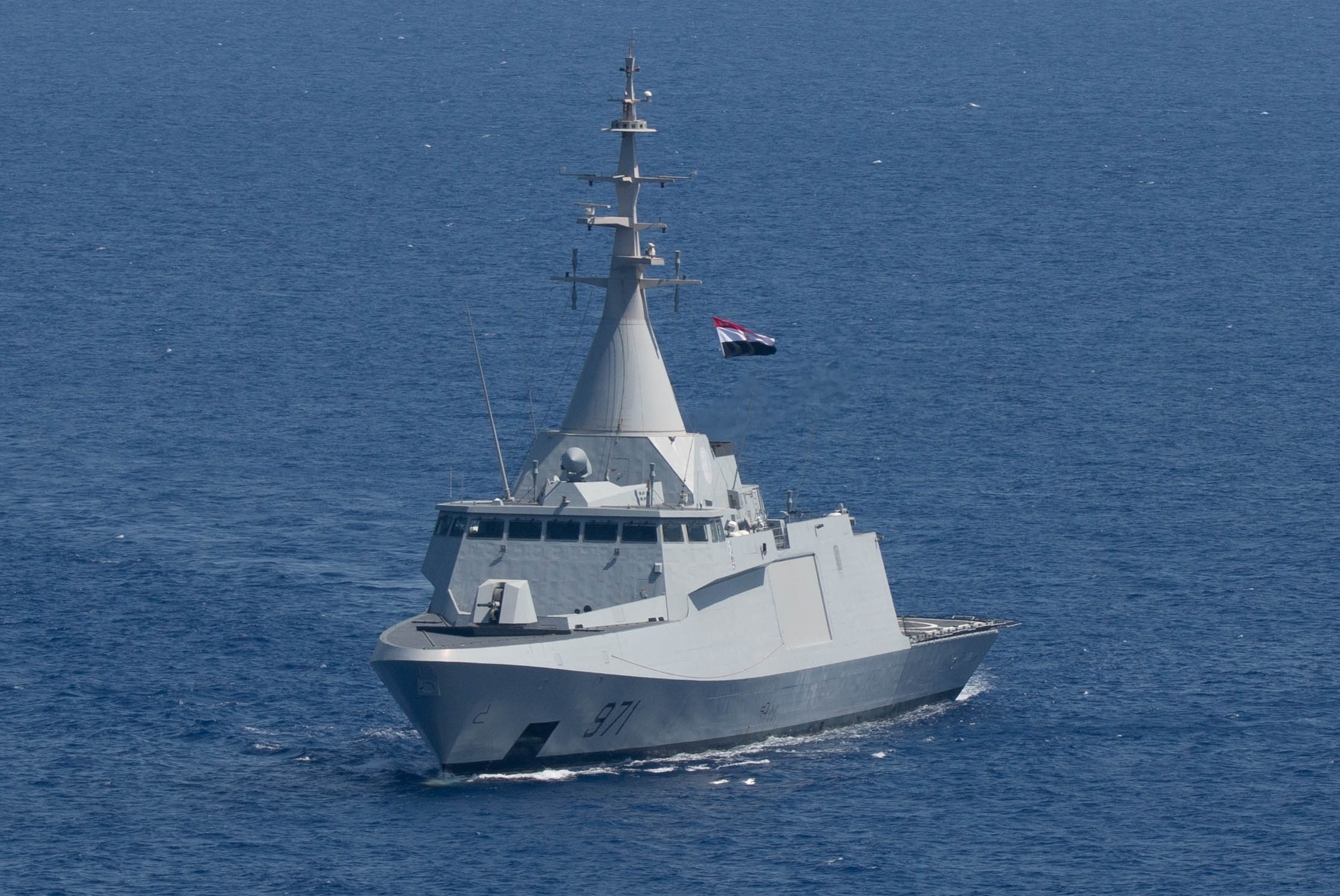
SGPV is based on enlarged version of the Gowind-class design

In 2011, Boustead Naval Shipyard was awarded a RM9 billion (US$2.8 billion) contract for the construction of 6 Second Generation Patrol Vessels also known as Maharaja Lela-class frigate for the Royal Malaysian Navy. Boustead Heavy Industries will design the ship with DCNS acting as the design authority and build all 6 ships entirely in Lumut, Malaysia. This represented the largest contract for the company since formation. The contract for the ships included intellectual property rights and technology transfer. The shipyard will undergo a major upgrade to accommodate the construction of the ships.

At DSA 2014, the program manager Mr Anuar replied to an interview saying that "The program is progressing rather well, with some parts already in critical design review" and "We expect the first ship to be finished by 2017 or early 2018". He also commented that the ships are "full fledged frigates and in my opinion, will be a huge deterrent for the Royal Malaysian Navy."

Various subcontracts like the Thales CAPTAS-2 Towed array sonar, the Bofors 57 mm gun, torpedo launching systems have already been awarded and the first ship was expected to be completed in 2018. Delivery of the ships has since been delayed and the first ship is now expected to be commissioned in 2025.

=== NGPV Program ===
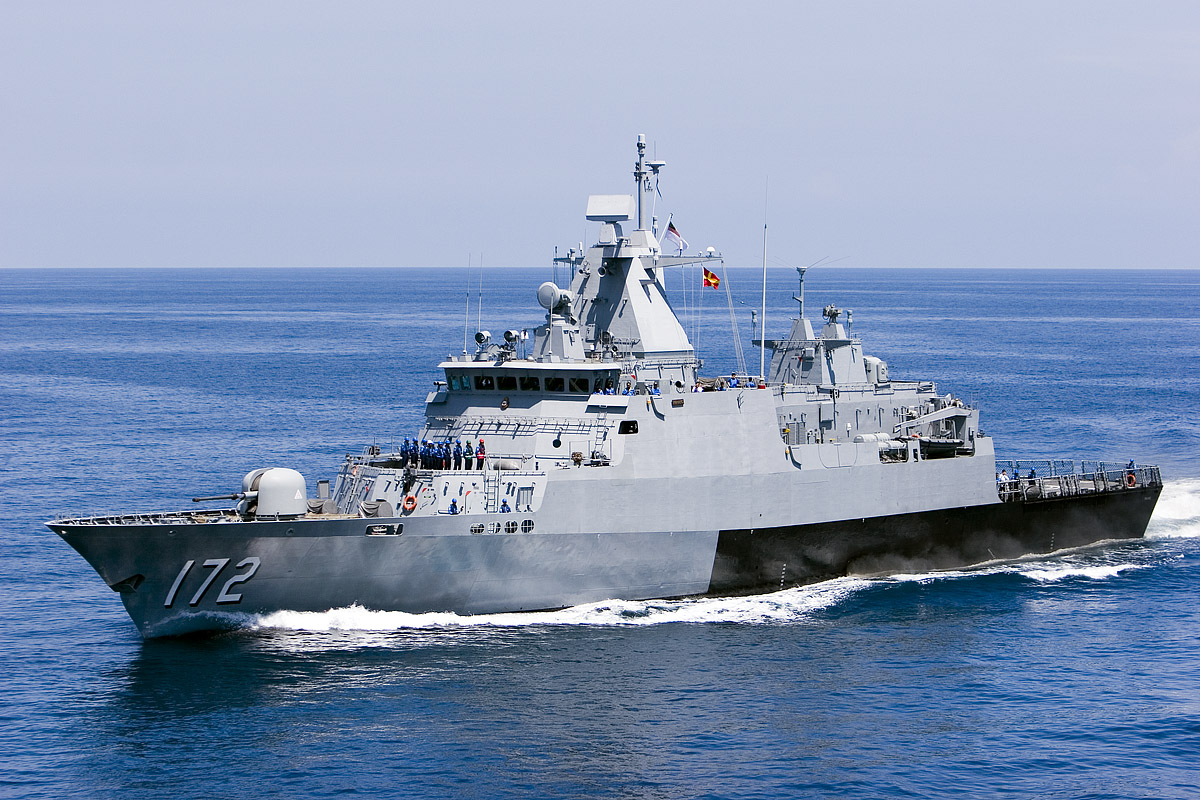
KD Kedah is the lead ship of NGPV

PSC-Naval Dockyard, the company now absorbed by Boustead Heavy Industries Corporation Berhad, was made the major contractor for the building and delivery of the New Generation Patrol Vessels (NGPV) programme for the Royal Malaysian Navy. An international tender for bids was announced, with Germany, Denmark, the Netherlands, the United States, Australia, United Kingdom and Italy amongst others submitting their bids. PSC-ND was set to joint venture with the winner to complete the program.

The German Naval Group (GNG) with their proposed model, based on the Blohm + Voss MEKO 100 design, won the bid. A contract was signed on 13 October 1998 for an initial six units, with the GNG as the major sub-contractor. A member of the GNG, the Hamburg-based Blohm + Voss was to build the first two ships, while PSC-ND was to complete the final fitting out and trials. The remaining ships were to be built at the PSC-Naval Dockyard from ship modules supplied by the GNG, with a gradual increase of local content.

Subsequent financial and delivery problems of PSC-Naval Dockyard caused by serious corruption caused the Malaysian government to engage Boustead Holdings Bhd to acquire PSC-Naval Dockyard and complete the program after a delay of 18 months. The class of ship will later be named Kedah-class.

=== Fast Troop Vessels ===
The class of fast troop vessels of the Royal Malaysian Navy with the length of 38 meters and displacing 117 tons.

=== Miscellaneous ===
Other than military vessels, Boustead Heavy Industries Corporation also provide commercial vessels, luxury yachts, heavy industrial steel structures and platforms for the oil and gas industry.

== Notable contracts ==
- In 2011, Boustead Naval Shipyard was awarded a RM9 billion (US$2.8 billion) contract for the construction of 6 Second Generation Patrol Vessels, representing the biggest contract ever awarded to Boustead Heavy Industries.
- In Dec 2011, an agreement between Contraves Advanced Devices Sdn Bhd and Rheinmetall Defence Electronics Gmbh was signed for the manufacture and supply of Cargo Loading System Assemblies for the Airbus A400M, Airbus A380, Airbus A330 aircraft during LIMA 2011.
- In February 2012, Contraves Advanced Devices was awarded an initial contract by Raytheon Company for the production and supply of components for the Evolved Sea Sparrow Missile (ESSM). This is the first contract of its type awarded to a Malaysian company. Raytheon qualified Contraves Advanced Devices Sdn. Bhd. as a participant in the Strategic Enterprise Aligned Commodities provider program and as a Raytheon preferred supplier.
- In March 2014, BHIC AeroServices was awarded a RM220 million contract for the maintenance and supply of spare parts for the Royal Malaysian Air Force's Eurocopter EC725 helicopters.
- In March 2014, Boustead Penang Shipyard was awarded a RM108 million contract for the provision of engineering, procurement, construction and commissioning of offshore topsides for Block SK309 Belum Satellite-A Platform, in phase two of the Sarawak Gas Development Project
- In September 2014, Boustead DCNS Naval Corporation Sdn Bhd (BDNC), a 60:40 joint venture consisting BHIC Defence Technologies Sdn Bhd and French-based DCNS, received the formal contract to undertake in-service support (ISS) for two of Malaysia's Scorpène-class submarine at RM1.31 billion collectively.
