= 30 mm Breda-Mauser =

30 mm/82 Compact
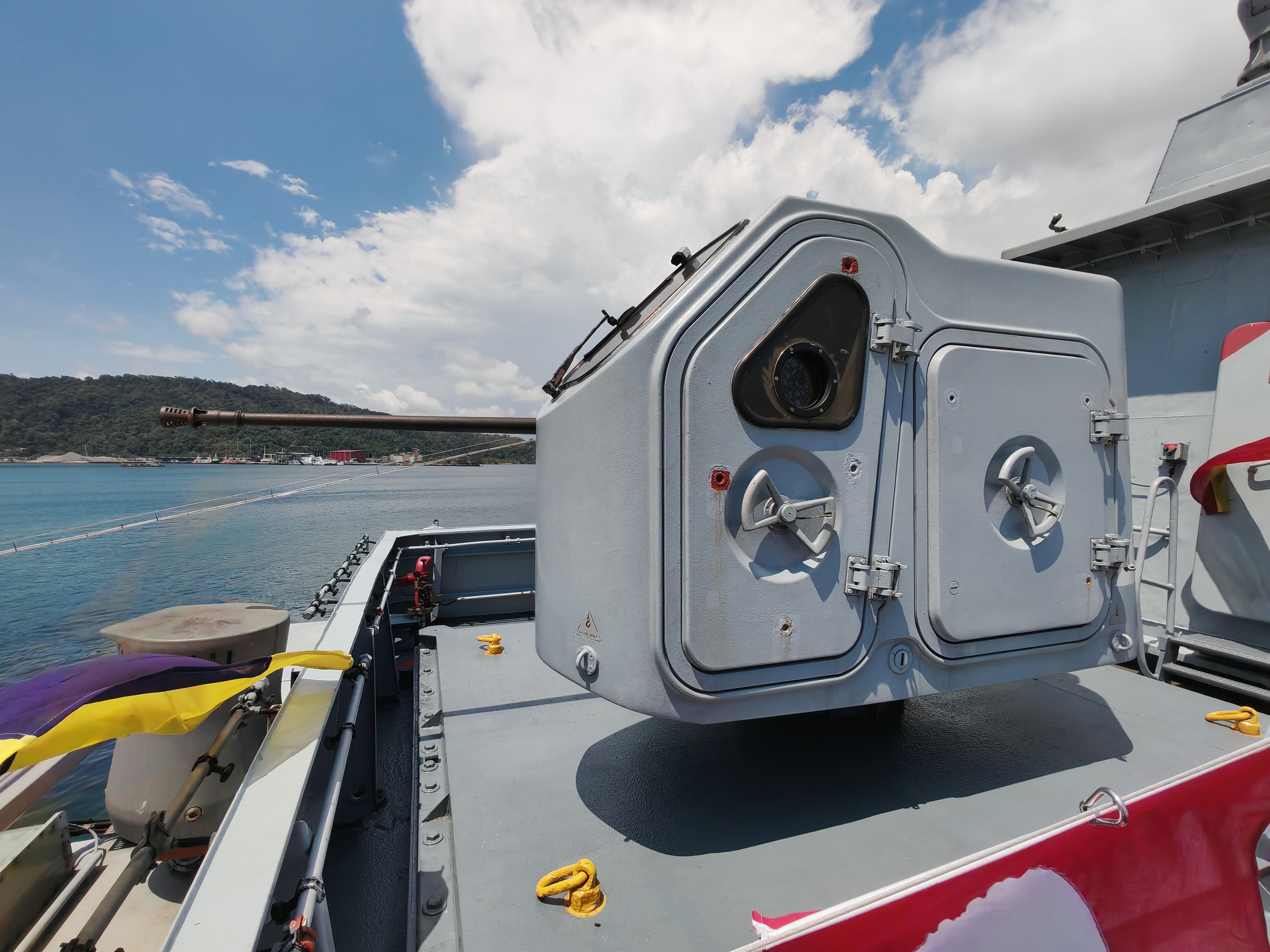
- a 30mm Breda-Mauser Naval Auto cannon implemented on the KD Kelantan
- Type: Auto-cannon naval gun
- Place of origin: Italy

Service history
- Used by: see Users

Production history
- Manufacturer: Alenia Marconi Systems; Oto-Breda

Specifications
- Barrel length: 82 calibres
- Calibre: 30 mm
- Rate of fire: 1600 rpm
- Effective firing range: 3,000 m (9,800 ft)

The 30 mm/82 Compact is a naval autocannon built by Alenia Marconi Systems and Oto-Breda, using the Mauser MK 30 mm Model F gun.

== Users ==
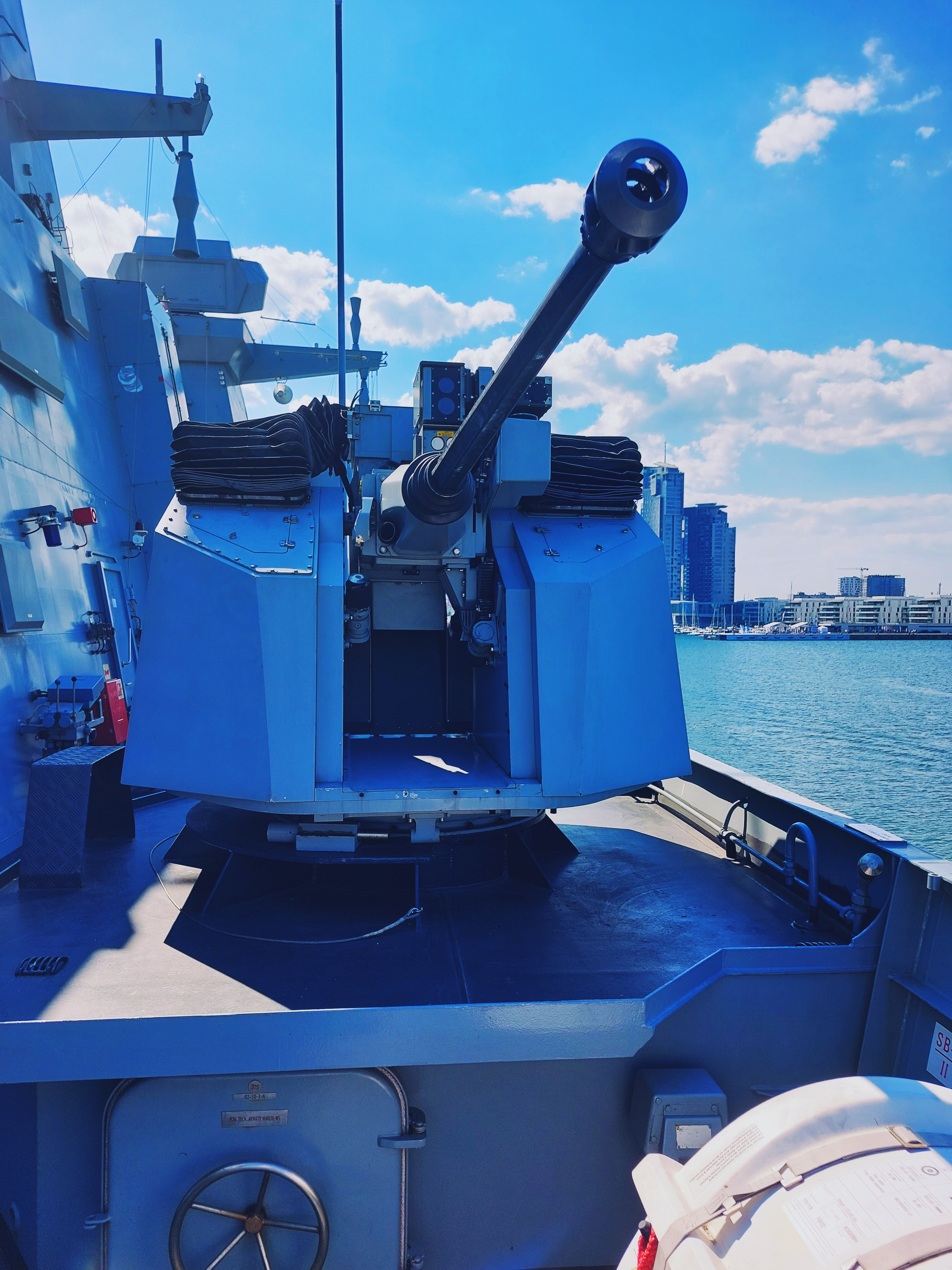
Modern version of the Marlin-WS autocannon on board the corvette ORP Ślązak

Platforms using the Breda 30/82 mm include:

France

- 7 x Georges Leygues class Marine Nationale = 14 x Breda 30/82 mm
- 2 x Foudre class Marine Nationale = 6 x Breda 30/82 mm
- 2 x Ouragan class Marine Nationale = 6 x Breda 30/82 mm

Greece

- 3 x Sa'ar 4 class Hellenic Coast Guard = 3 x Breda SAFS 30/82 mm, local control

Italy

- P01 Zara Guardia di Finanza = 1 x twin Breda 30/82 mm (decommissioned)
- P02 Vizzarri Guardia di Finanza = 1 x twin Breda 30/82 mm (decommissioned)
- P03 Denaro Guardia di Finanza = 1 x Breda 30/82 mm
- G.1 + G.2 Mazzei class - Bigliani batch IV Guardia di Finanza = 2 x Breda 30/82 mm
- G.3 / G.7 Di Bartolo class - Bigliani batch V Guardia di Finanza = 5 x Breda 30/82 mm
- G.8 + G.9 Di Bartolo class - Bigliani batch VII Guardia di Finanza = 2 x Breda 30/82 mm
- G.92 / G.103 Corrubia class - batch II Guardia di Finanza 12 x Breda 30/82 mm
- G.78 + G.79 + G.88 + G.89 Bigliani class - batch III Guardia di Finanza 4 x Breda 30/82 mm

Malaysia

- 6 x Kedah class. Royal Malaysian Navy.1 system for one ship.

Mexico

- 6 x Oaxaca class = 6 x Breda SAFS 30/82 mm, local control

Thailand

- Khamronsin class Royal Thai Navy = 3 x Breda 30/82 mm

Venezuela

- Constitucion class Bolivarian Navy of Venezuela = 3 x Breda 30/82 mm

Brazil

- Brazilian ship Bahia = 3 x Breda 30/82 mm

Poland

- Gawron class ORP Ślązak = 2 x Marlin-WS 30 mm
