= German Naval Group =

The German Naval Group is a consortium of German industrial companies that bid and won a major contract to design and build the New Generation Patrol vessels (NGPV) for the Royal Malaysian Navy.

== Background ==
German Naval Group supplies a range of naval vessels to customers worldwide. For the Royal Malaysian Navy bid, the German Naval Group proposed the Blohm + Voss MEKO 100 for the design and delivery a new class of offshore patrol vessels for the Royal Malaysian Navy. Under the German Naval Group proposal, the first batch of ships will be built in German shipyards while the remainder of the order will be fulfilled by ships built in Malaysian shipyards.

The group consists of the German shipyards:

- Howaldtswerke-Deutsche Werft AG, Kiel
- Blohm + Voss GmbH, Hamburg
- Nordsee Werke GmbH, Emden

The German Naval Group commercial partner includes MAN Ferrostaal that supplies marine diesels. The consortium grouping enables the group to offer a complete range of naval vessels and services to customers.

== Royal Malaysian Navy requirement ==
The Royal Malaysian Navy requirement was a substantial purchase and attracted many bids from interested shipbuilders. American shipbuilders have traditionally not done well in Malaysia and were ruled out early on. Australia’s Transfield group was a strong contender for the project, as the Royal Australian Navy was also then looking into the building of a class of patrol vessels. Australian political leadership lent weight to the Australian proposal, with the message of the benefits of a regional collaborative effort in building the common design. British shipyards have done well in previous bids and remained a front runner. Yarrow have previously supplied Malaysia with its two FFL frigates.

The German Naval Group (GNG) won the bid to build the NGPV for the Royal Malaysian Navy and was awarded the initial contract 13 October 1998 for an initial six units based on the Blohm + Voss MEKO 100 design. The German Naval Group is the major sub-contractor on the NGPV programme, and Hamburg-based Blohm & Voss will build the first two ships deliver them to Malaysia for final fitting-out and trials. The class of ship has now been called the Kedah Class Offshore Patrol Vessel.

The other four ships are to be built at the PSC-Naval Dockyard in Malaysia from ship sets supplied by the German Naval Group. PSC-Naval Dockyard in Lumut, Malaysia, is the prime contractor for all six of the Malaysian ships. The order for six ships is the first group in a series of a planned purchase of 27 vessels.

The Malaysian government was to pay 20% advance payment of the total RM5.6 billion. The advance came to RM1.07 billion. Of this, RM243 million was paid to PSC-Naval Dockyard with the balance of RM928 million still payable to the company. The Royal Malaysian Navy had intended the building of 27 OPVs under the program. The initial order of six vessels with PSC-Naval Dockyard (and the German Naval Group) will involve technology transfer from the German Naval Group to PSC-Naval Dockyard.

The contract would include the supply of spare parts for the first two years, after which the spare parts will be manufactured in Malaysia by PSC Naval Dockyard. The contract also specified a local content of not less than 30 percent, and an offset program of not less than 30% of the contract value. The German Naval Group is also to make a counter purchase obligation amounting to 11% of the contract value.

The German Naval Group has now been formally merged under the ThyssenKrupp companies. Howaldtswerke Deutsche Werft AG was purchased in 2005 to complete the triumvirate of HDW, NDW and Blohm + Voss in ThyssenKrupp Marine.
