= MEKO =

Family of warships

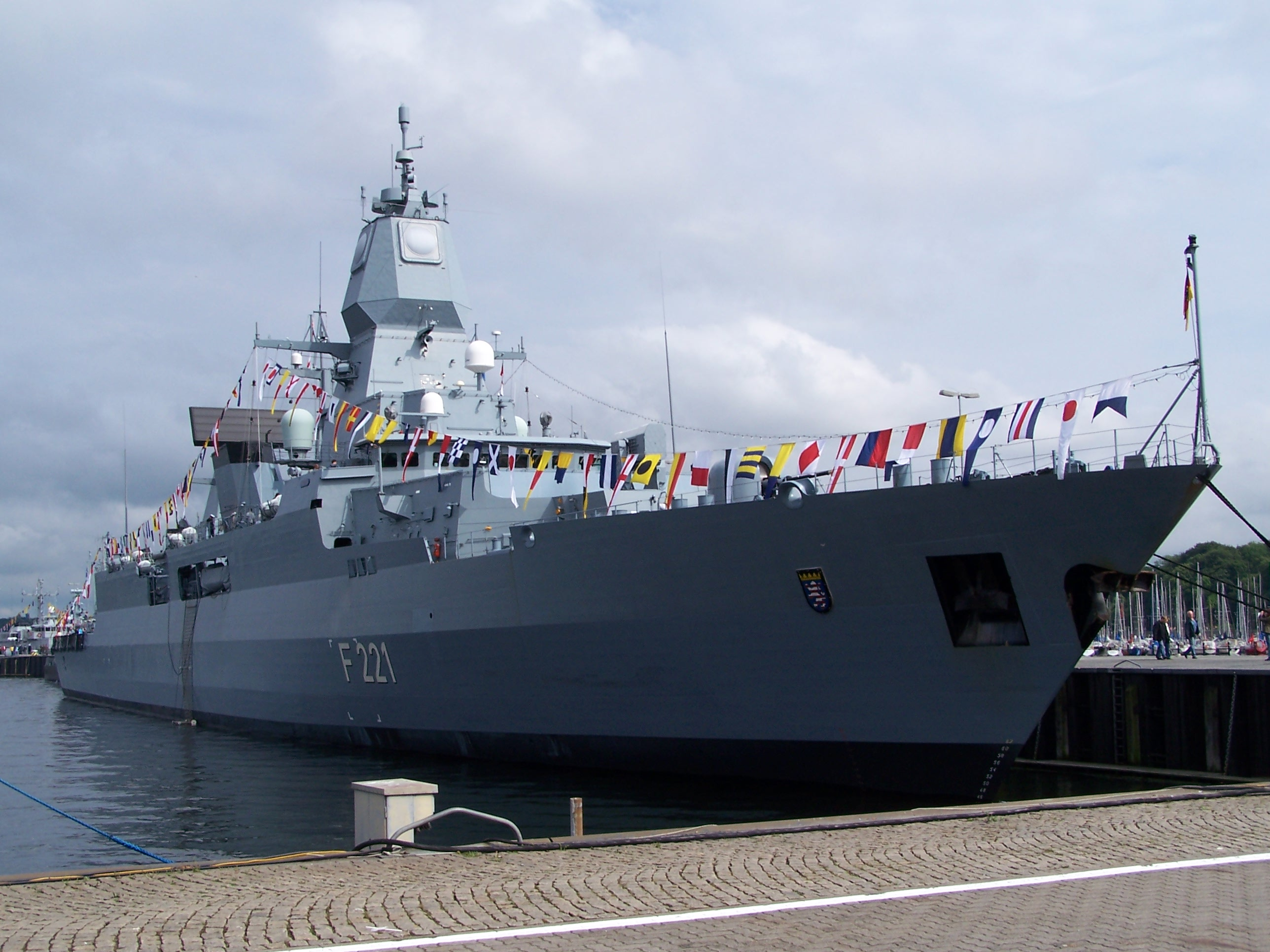
Hessen (F 221), a F124-class frigate (Sachsen-class frigate) of the German Navy.

The MEKO family of warships was developed by the German company Blohm+Voss. MEKO is a registered trademark. The portmanteau stands for "Mehrzweck-Kombination" (English: multi-purpose-combination). It is a concept in modern naval shipbuilding based on modularity of armament, electronics and other equipment, aiming at ease of maintenance and cost reduction.

MEKO ships include families of frigates, corvettes and ocean-going patrol boats. Construction of MEKO ships began in the late 1970s with the design and later building of Nigeria's MEKO 360 H1. Vessels of similar classes use different weapons systems. For example, for the main gun, some MEKO 200s use the Mk 45 Mod 2 gun, others use the French 100 mm naval gun or Otobreda 76 mm gun.

The latest variant is the "Combat Ship for the Littorals" or MEKO CSL. It has also been called a "Littoral Combatant Ship", but it is much smaller than the American Littoral Combat Ship (LCS). There was speculation that this design would be of interest to Israel, but it was not. Ultimately however, Israel opted for four modified K130 Braunschweig-class corvettes, the first of which entered service in late 2020. The new variant is dubbed the Sa'ar 6-class corvette. Eight extended versions of MEKO A-100 frigate vessels are planned to be supplied for the Brazilian Navy. The consortium is formed by Germany's Thyssenkrupp Marine Systems, Embraer Defense & Security and Atech, a subsidiary of the Embraer Group. The construction of the vessels, which are more than 100 meters long, are planned for the Oceana shipyard in Itajaí.

== Models ==
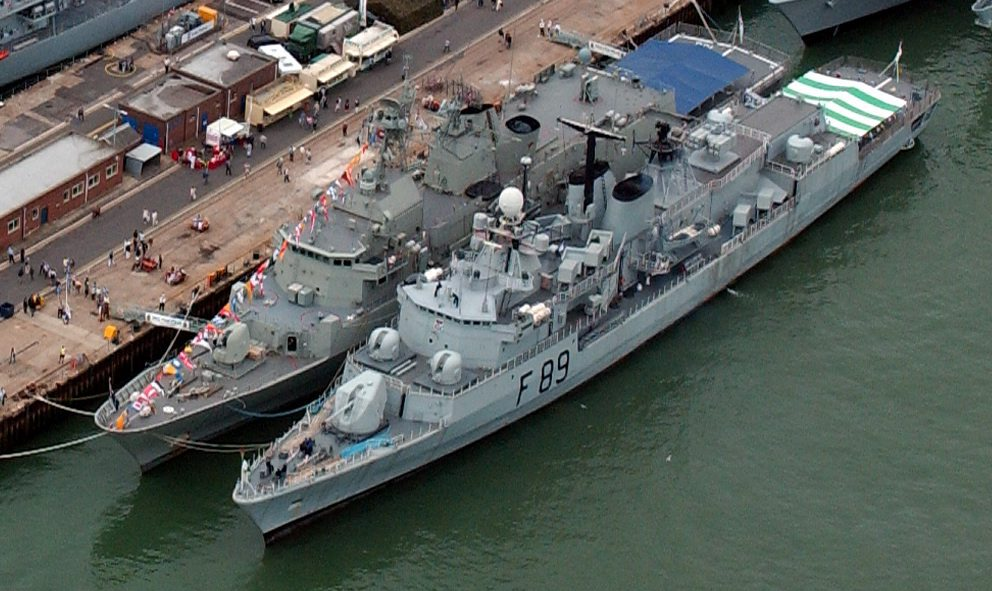
MEKO 360 NNS Aradu, alongside the smaller MEKO 200 frigate HMAS Anzac

The following MEKO models are known to have been built, organized by lineage and delivery dates:

- MEKO 360 (1981) is the earliest MEKO ship.
- MEKO 140 (1985) is designed as a companion ship of MEKO 360, developed from the Portuguese João Coutinho class corvettes.
- MEKO 200 (1987) is a frigate design. It evolved into the MEKO A-200 (2001) and the larger MEKO A-300 (planned for Greece and Poland).
- F123 (1994), F124 (2002), and F125 (2016) are a line of MEKO frigates developed for the German Navy.
- K130 (2008) is a corvette designed for the German Navy using some F124 technology.
  - Israeli Sa'ar 6 (2021) is a heavily modified descendant.
- MEKO A-100 (2019) is a current design.
  - The 2012 A-100 is a single corvette developed from the A-200. It is occasionally quoted as the same as the MEKO 100 RMN (2004).
  - The current design is a family of three sizes (all heavier and longer than the 2012 A-100): corvette, light frigate, patrol corvette.

As of July 2026, the MEKO website showcases the following models:

- MEKO A-100 Light Frigate.
- MEKO A-200 Frigate.
- MEKO A-400 AMD

== Vessels ==
Model	Class	Country	Number	Delivery	Weight	Length o.a. (m)	Beam (m)	Draught (m)	Main gun	SAM	ASM	Image
MEKO A-400 AMD	F127 class destroyer	Germany	(5 planned)	(early 2030s)	12,000 tons	178.00	24.00	7.80	TBA	TBA	TBS	–
F125	Baden-Württemberg	Germany	4	2016-	7,200 tons	149.52	18.80	5.00	Otobreda 127 mm	RIM-116	Harpoon	
F124	Sachsen	Germany	3	2002–	5,690 tons	143.00	17.44	4.86	Otobreda 76 mm	RIM-116, RIM-162, RIM-66	Harpoon	
F123	Brandenburg-class frigate	Germany	4	1994–1996	3,600 tons	138.85	16.70	4.35	Otobreda 76 mm	RIM-116, RIM-7	Exocet, RBS-15	
MEKO A-200 DEU-class frigate	F128 class frigate	Germany	(8 ordered)	(December 2029)	3,950	121.00	16.40	4.40	TBA	TBA	TBS	–
MEKO A-200 AN	Erradii class frigate	Algeria	2	2016-	3,700 tons	122	16.3	4.4	Otobreda 127 mm	Umkhonto IR	RBS-15	
MEKO A-200 EN	Al-Aziz class frigate	Egypt	6	2022–2025	3,700 tons	120	14.8	4.3	Otobreda 127 mm	MICA NG	Exocet	
MEKO A-200 SAN	Valour-class frigate	South Africa	4	2003–2004	3,700 tons	121.00	16.34	4.40	Otobreda 76 mm	Umkhonto	Exocet	
MEKO 200	Anzac-class frigate	Australia New Zealand	8 (Aus) 2 (NZ)	1996–2004	3,500 tons	118.00	14.80	4.10	Mk 45 Mod 4 gun	RAN: RIM-162, RNZN: RIM-7, Phalanx Block 1	RAN: Harpoon RNZN: None	
MEKO 200 PN	Vasco da Gama-class frigate	Portugal	3	1991–	3,400 tons	115.90	14.80	4.10	French 100 mm naval gun	RIM-7	Harpoon	
MEKO 360 H1	NNS Aradu frigate	Nigeria	1	1981	3,360 tons	125.80	15.00	4.30	Otobreda 127/54 Compact	Aspide	Otomat	
MEKO 360 H2	Almirante Brown-class destroyer	Argentina	4	1983–1984	3,360 tons	125.80	15.00	4.30	Otobreda 127/54 Compact	Aspide	Exocet	
MEKO 200HN	Hydra-class frigate	Greece	4	1992	3,360 tons	117.00	14.80	4.10	Mk 45 Mod 2 gun	RIM-162	Harpoon	
MEKO 200 TN II-B	Barbaros-class frigate	Turkey	2	1998–	3,100 tons	118.00	14.80	4.30	Mk 45 Mod 2 gun	RIM-7, RIM-162	Harpoon	
MEKO 200 TN II-A	Barbaros-class frigate	Turkey	2	1995–	3,100 tons	116.70	14.80	4.10	Mk 45 Mod 2 gun	RIM-7, RIM-162	Harpoon	
MEKO 200 TN I	Yavuz-class frigate	Turkey	4	1987–1989	3,030 tons	110.50	14.20	4.14	Mk 45 Mod 2 gun	RIM-7	Harpoon	
MEKO 140 A16	Espora-class corvette	Argentina	6	1985–2002	1,560 tons	91.20	11.00	3.33	Otobreda 76 mm	–	Exocet	
MEKO 100 RMN	Kedah-class offshore patrol vessel	Malaysia	6	2004–2010	1,850 tons	91.10	12.85	3.40	Otobreda 76 mm	–	–	
MEKO A-100	Gawron class corvette	Poland	1	2019	2,150 tons	95.20	13.30	3.60	Otobreda 76 mm	Grom	–	
–	Sa'ar 6-class corvette	Israel	4	2020-	2,000 tons	90.00	12.44	3.40	OTO Melara 76 mm	Barak MX, C-Dome	Gabriel V	
K130 - Batch I	Braunschweig-class corvette	Germany	5	2008–	1,840 tons	88.75	12.80	3.40	Otobreda 76 mm	RIM-116	RBS-15	
K130 - Batch II	Braunschweig-class corvette	Germany	5	2025–	1,840 tons	88.75	12.80	3.40	Otobreda 76 mm	RIM-116	RBS-15	
MEKO A-100 BR	Tamandaré-class frigate	Brazil	9	2024–	3,500 tons	107.2	16	5.2	OTO Melara 76 mm	CAMM	MANSUP	

== See also ==
- List of frigate classes in service
- List of corvette classes in service

Equivalent warship designs of the same era

- SIGMA
- Gowind

== Bibliography ==
- Miller, David, ed. (1997). Jane's Major Warships. Vol. 2. Coulsdon, Surrey: Jane's Information Group. ISBN 0-7106-1720-8.
