= List of equipment of the Malaysian Armed Forces =

The equipment of the Malaysian Armed Forces can be subdivided into: infantry weapon, heavy equipment and attire.

== Infantry weapons ==
Arms ammunition

- Cal. 0.38 Special (Lead round Nose)
- 9×19mm Ball (Luger/Parabellum)
- HK 4.6×30mm
- 5.56×45mm NATO
  - M193 Ball (Loose/Link)
  - M855/SS109 Steel Core
  - M196 Tracer
  - M200 Blank
  - Blank Long Nose
- 7.62×51mm NATO
  - 4B1T
- 12.7 mm (All Natures)
- 20 mm Oerlikon (All Natures)
- 25 mm Bushmaster (All Natures)
- 30 mm ADEN (All Natures)
- 35 mm Oerlikon (All Natures)
- Rounds 57 mm L70 AA Ammunition
- 60 mm and 81 mm Mortar Bombs
- Rounds 90 mm HE-T/HESH-T
- 105 mm Artillery Ammunition
- 155 mm Artillery Ammunition
- 84 mm Carl-Gustav Ammunition
- Rounds 105 mm HE
- Aircraft Bombs
- Aircraft Rockets
- Sea and Land Mines
- Starburst Practice Missile Refurbishment
- Cast Booster
- Demolition Charge (1 lb, 10 lb and 25 lb)

| Name | Picture | Type | Caliber | Branches | Notes |
Pistols
| Tanfoglio Limited | | Semi-automatic pistol | 9×19mm Parabellum | Army | 30 purchased in 2021. Used by the Malaysian Army Shooting Team and 10th Bde (Para). |
| Glock | | Semi-automatic pistol | 9×19mm Parabellum | Army, Navy, Air Force | Standard service pistol. |
| Beretta 92 | | Semi-automatic pistol | 9×19mm Parabellum | Army | |
| Browning Hi-Power | | Semi-automatic pistol | 9×19mm Parabellum | Army, Air Force | Standard issue sidearm for senior-rank officer and special forces. |
| SIG Sauer P226 | | Semi-automatic pistol | 9×19mm Parabellum | Army, Air Force | |
| P9 | | Semi-automatic pistol | 9×19mm Parabellum | Navy | |
| P11 | | Semi-automatic pistol | 9×19mm Parabellum | Navy | |
| P30 | | Semi-automatic pistol | 9×19mm Parabellum | Navy | |
| SP1 | | Semi-automatic pistol | 9×19mm Parabellum | Navy | |
| Canik TP9SF | | Semi-automatic pistol | 9×19mm Parabellum | Navy | |
| HS2000 | | Semi-automatic pistol | 9×19mm Parabellum | Army | |
| HK45 | | Semi-automatic pistol | .45 ACP | Navy | |
| Mk23 | | Semi-automatic pistol | .45 ACP | Navy | |
Shotguns
| SPAS12 | | Shotgun | 12-gauge | Army | |
| M4 Super 90 | | Shotgun | 12-gauge | Army, Air Force | |
| 500 MILS | | Shotgun | 12-gauge | Army, Air Force | |
| M870 | | Shotgun | 12-gauge | Army, Navy, Air Force | |
| M1100 | | Shotgun | 12-gauge | Navy | |
| FP6 | | Shotgun | 12-gauge | Navy | |
Submachine guns
| SIG MPX | | Submachine gun | 9×19mm Parabellum | Army | 155 units ordered in 2022. |
| PMX | | Submachine gun | 9×19mm Parabellum | Army, Navy | 47 units delivered in 2022. |
| UMP | | Submachine gun | 9×19mm Parabellum | Navy | |
| MP9 | | Submachine gun | 9×19mm Parabellum | Air Force | |
| MP5 | | Submachine gun | 9×19mm Parabellum | Army, Navy, Air Force | |
| MP7 | | Submachine gun | HK 4.6×30mm | Navy | |
| P90 | | Submachine gun | FN 5.7×28mm | Navy, Air Force | |
Assault rifles / Carbines
| M16A1 | | Assault rifle | 5.56×45mm NATO | Army, Navy, Air Force | |
| CAR15 | | Carbine | 5.56×45mm NATO | Army | |
| Steyr AUG | | Assault rifle | 5.56×45mm NATO | Army, Navy, Air Force | Manufactured locally by SME Ordnance. 40 additional A3 variant acquired in 2025. |
| M4A1 | | Carbine | 5.56×45mm NATO | Army, Navy, Air Force | Manufactured locally by SME Ordnance. Standard service rifle of the Malaysian Armed Forces. |
| HK416 | | Carbine | 5.56×45mm NATO | Navy | |
| HK33 | | Assault rifle | 5.56×45mm NATO | Army | |
| SG 553 | | Carbine | 5.56×45mm NATO | Army, Air Force | |
| AK102 | | Assault rifle | 5.56×45mm NATO | Navy | |
| G36 | | Assault rifle | 5.56×45mm NATO | Navy | |
| XM8 | | Assault rifle | 5.56×45mm NATO | Navy | |
Battle rifles / Sniper rifles / Designated marksman rifles / Anti-materiel rifles
| M14 | | Battle rifle | 7.62×51mm NATO | Navy | |
| M40 | | Sniper rifle | 7.62×51mm NATO | Navy | |
| CM901 | | Battle rifle | 7.62×51mm NATO | Army | |
| AW | | Sniper rifle | 7.62×51mm NATO | Army | |
| R93 | | Sniper rifle | 7.62×51mm NATO | Army | |
| MSG90 | | Sniper rifle | 7.62×51mm NATO | Army | |
| AX308 | | Sniper rifle | 7.62×51mm NATO | Army, Navy, Air Force | Standard issue sniper rifle. 28 additional units ordered in 2020. |
| PSG1 | | Sniper rifle | 7.62×51mm NATO | Army | |
| SR25 | | Designated marksman rifle | 7.62×51mm NATO | Army | |
| DSR1 | | Designated marksman rifle | 7.62×51mm NATO | Army | |
| REC-10 | | Designated marksman rifle | 7.62×51mm NATO | Army | First seen in 2023 Merdeka Parade. |
| Beretta ARX 200 | | Designated marksman rifle | 7.62×51mm NATO | Navy, Air Force | First seen in Latgabma Malindo Darsasa 2023 Exercise. |
| Sako TRG | | Sniper rifle | 7.62×51mm NATO | Army | |
| HK417 | | Sniper rifle | 7.62×51mm NATO | Navy | |
| M110 SASS | | Sniper rifle | 7.62×51mm NATO | Navy | First seen in 2023 Merdeka Parade. |
| M95 | | Sniper rifle | .50 BMG | Army | |
| Barrett M82 | | Sniper rifle | .50 BMG | Army | 40 additional units ordered in 2020 and 19 new M107A1 variant acquired in 2025. |
| AR50 | | Sniper rifle | .50 BMG | Navy | |
| AW50 | | Sniper rifle | .50 BMG | Navy | |
| RC50 | | Sniper rifle | .50 BMG | Navy | |
| M96 | | Anti-materiel rifle | .50 BMG | Army | |
| NTW20 | | Anti-materiel rifle | 20×82mm | Army | |
Machine guns
| M240 | | General-purpose machine gun | 7.62×51mm NATO | Army | |
| M60 | | General-purpose machine gun | 7.62×51mm NATO | Army | |
| HK21 | | General-purpose machine gun | 7.62×51mm NATO | Army | |
| FN MAG | | General-purpose machine gun | 7.62×51mm NATO | Army | |
| MG5 | | General-purpose machine gun | 7.62×51mm NATO | Navy | |
| SS77 | | General-purpose machine gun | 7.62×51mm NATO | Navy | |
| M249 SAW | | Light machine gun | 5.56×45mm NATO | Army, Air Force | 210 acquired in 2025. |
| MG4 | | Light machine gun | 5.56×45mm NATO | Navy | |
| FN Minimi | | Light machine gun | 5.56×45mm NATO | Army | 240 additional units ordered in 2020. |
| Ameli | | Light machine gun | 5.56×45mm NATO | Navy | |
| RPK | | Light machine gun | 5.45×39mm | Army | |
Grenade launchers / Vehicle weapons
| M203 grenade launcher | | Single shot, break action grenade launcher | 40 mm grenade | Army, Navy, Air Force | |
| Heckler & Koch AG36 | | Single shot, break action grenade launcher | 40 mm grenade | Navy | |
| M79 grenade launcher | | Single shot, break action grenade launcher | 40 mm grenade | Army | |
| M320 Grenade Launcher Module | | Single shot, break action grenade launcher | 40 mm grenade | Navy | |
| Milkor MGL | | Revolver style grenade launcher | 40 mm grenade | Army | |
| Mk 19 Grenade Machine Gun | | Automatic grenade launcher | 40 mm grenade | Army | |
| Heckler & Koch GMG | | Automatic grenade launcher | 40 mm grenade | Navy | |
| M134 Minigun | | Six-barrelled gatling gun | 7.62×51mm NATO | Army, Air Force | |
| FN Herstal M3M | | Heavy machine gun | 12.7×99mm NATO | Navy | |
| M2 HMG | | Heavy machine gun | 12.7×99mm NATO | Army, Navy, Air Force | |
| CANiK M2 QCB | | Heavy machine gun | 12.7×99mm NATO | Army, Navy | |
| Mertsav MHMG-127 | | Heavy machine gun | 12.7×99mm NATO | Army | 86 acquired in 2025. |
| Sentinel RWS | | Remote controlled weapon station | 12.7×99mm NATO | Navy | Mounted on G2000 FIC 18M. |
| Aselsan SIPER | | Remote controlled weapon station | 12.7×99mm NATO | Army | Mounted on Mildef Tarantula. |
| Aselsan SARP | | Remote controlled weapon station | 7.62×51mm or 12.7×99mm NATO | Army | Mounted on Ejder Yalcin. |
| Reutech Rogue | | Remote controlled weapon station | 12.7×99mm NATO | Army | Mounted on AV8 Gempita. |
Mortars
| Thales 2R2M | | Mortar carrier | 120 mm mortar | Army | Total of 16 in service. 8 installed in ACV-300 Adnan and 8 installed in AV8 Gempita SPM120 variants. |
| Tecnesis 3000 | | Mortar carrier | 81 mm mortar | Army | Total of 132 in service. Installed on Cendana Auto 4x4 completed with Talos FCS. |
| 2B14 | | Mortar | 82 mm mortar | Army | |
| L16 | | Mortar | 81 mm mortar | Army | |
| Expal M86 | | Mortar | 81 mm mortar | Army | |
| Denel Vektor M8 | | Mortar | 81 mm mortar | Army | |
| Yugoimport M69 mortar | | Mortar | 81 mm mortar | Army | In limited service and being replaced by the Tecnesis mortars. Now issued to Rejimen Sempadan for their organic Support Companies. |
| Yugoimport Commando M70 mortar | | Mortar | 60 mm mortar | Army | |
| Hirtenberger M6 mortar | | Mortar | 60 mm mortar | Army | |
| Esperanza mortar | | Mortar | 60 mm mortar | Army | |
Anti-tank weapons
| NLAW | | Anti-tank guided missile system | 150 mm HEAT | Army | 500 in inventory. |
| Metis-M | | Anti-tank guided missile system | 130 mm | Army | 100 in inventory. Mounted on Mercedes-Benz G-Class. |
| ZT3 Ingwe | | Anti-tank guided missile system | 127 mm | Army | 54 units of four-tube launcher turret and 216 missiles in inventory. Mounted on AV8 Gempita. |
| Karaok | | Anti-tank guided missile system | 125 mm | Army | 18 launcher and 108 missiles on order. Mounted on Cendana Auto 4x4. |
| Baktar-Shikan | | Anti-tank guided missile system | 120 mm | Army | 450 in inventory. Mounted on ACV-300 Adnan. |
| M40 | | Anti-tank recoilless rifle | 105 mm | Army | 24 in inventory. |
| C90 | | Anti-tank rocket system | 90 mm | Army | In service since 1990. 780+178 additional units ordered in 2024. |
| Carl Gustaf | | Anti-tank recoilless rifle | 84 mm | Army | M2 and M3 variant in service. 110 additional units of M4 variant ordered in 2021. |
| M72 LAW | | Anti-tank rocket rystem | 66 mm | Army | In service since 2015. M72 EC LAW and MKE HAR 66 variant in service. 800 MKE HAR 66 ordered in 2024. |
| RPG-7 | | Rocket-propelled grenade | 40 mm | Army | RPG-7V, RBR-7 and ATGL-L variant in service. Standard issue rocket-propelled grenade. 150 additional units of RBR-7 ordered in 2021. |
Anti-aircraft weapons
| Rapier | | Ground based air defence system / SHORAD | | Army | Rapier 2000 / Jernas. 15 Jernas launchers with more than 150 missiles. |
| RapidRanger / RapidRover / Starstreak LML | | Vehicle mounted air defence system / SHORAD | | Army | ForceSHIELD System. 24 RapidRanger / LML launchers procured in 2015 and 4 more procured in 2025. Installed on URO VAMTAC, Cendana Auto Tornado and Weststar GK-M1/M2. |
| Igla Dzhigit | | Vehicle mounted air defence system / SHORAD | 72 mm | Army | 40 Djigit launchers. Installed on URO VAMTAC. |
| Starstreak | | Man-portable air-defence system | | Army, Air Force | 120 in inventory. |
| Igla | | Man-portable air-defence system | 72 mm | Army | 382 in inventory. |
| Anza | | Man-portable air-defence system | 72 mm | Army | 600 in inventory. |
| FN-6 | | Man-portable air-defence system | 72 mm | Army | 64 in inventory. |
| Bofors | | Anti-aircraft artillery | 40 mm | Army | 36 in inventory. |
| Oerlikon | | Anti-aircraft artillery | 35 mm | Army | 28 in inventory. |

== Heavy equipment ==
=== Malaysian Army ===
| Vehicle | Image | Type | Origin | Quantity | Notes |
Tanks
| PT-91M Pendekar | | Main battle tank | Poland | 48 | Fitted with the SAGEM Savan 12 FCS, VIGY-15 commander's panoramic sight, Obra-3 laser warning system and the Slovak 2A46MS gun. |
Armoured fighting vehicles (tracked)
| K-200A1 MIFV | | Armored personnel carrier | South Korea | 111 | Originally purchased under UOR for UNPROFOR, the fleet includes K200A1 Personnel Carriers, K277A1 Command Vehicles, the K288A1 ARV, K200A1 Ambulance and the K281A1 81 mm Self-Propelled Mortar. All vehicles have since been upgraded to A1 standard and retrofitted with Wegmann 76 mm smoke launchers. |
| ACV-300 Adnan | | Infantry fighting vehicle | Turkey; Malaysia | 267 | License built in Pahang by DefTech. The IFV variants are fitted with a Sharpshooter turret mounting either a 25 mm Bushmaster autocannon or a 40 mm Mark 19 AGL, plus a coaxial 7.62 mm FN MAG. The APC variant is armed with a single 12.7 mm M2HB in the Helio FVT800 turret. Other variants include Command, Signals, ATGM Carrier, Recovery, Fitter, Ambulance, as well as 81 mm and 120 mm Self-Propelled Mortars. |
Armoured fighting vehicles (wheeled)
| AV8 Gempita | | Armoured fighting vehicle | Malaysia | 257 | Built locally by DefTech. Variants include: IFV25 with the Sharpshooter turret, AFV30 with the Denel LCT30 turret, ATGW Carrier with the ZT3 Ingwe, Command, Signals, Personnel Carrier and CBRN Reconnaissance Vehicle with the Reutech Rogue RWS, SURV with the Rheinmetall Vingtaqs II and Thales Squire, Self-Propelled Mortar with the 120 mm 2R2M, Recovery, Fitter and Ambulance. |
| Tarantula HMAV | | Mine-resistant ambush protected vehicle | Malaysia | 0+(136) | 136 on order. Armed with Aselsan SIPER RWS. |
| AV4 Lipanbara | | Mine-resistant ambush protected vehicle | Thailand; Malaysia | 20 | Built locally by DefTech. Armed with a 7.62 mm Dillon Aero M134D minigun. |
| Ejder Yalcin | | Mine-resistant ambush protected vehicle | Turkey | 20 | Locally known as Panthera. Purchased for MALBATT in Lebanon. Fitted with the Aselsan SARP RWS. |
| Guardian | | Mine-resistant ambush protected vehicle | United Arab Emirates | 12 | Purchased for MALBATT in Lebanon. Optionally armed with a single 7.62 mm FN MAG in an open-top turret. |
| Chaiseri Jackal | | High-mobility armoured vehicle | Thailand | 0+(9) | Operated by the Royal Artillery Regiment. |
| KLTV | | High-mobility armoured vehicle | South Korea | 0+(17) | Operated by the Royal Artillery Regiment. |
| Ferret | | Ceremonial parade vehicle | United Kingdom | 8 | At least 8 in service with registration number of 599, 1197, 1199, 2662, 4281, 4567, 4642, 6577. |
Tracked articulated all-terrain carriers
| Bandvagn 206 | | Armoured all-terrain carrier | Sweden | 80 | Purchased under UOR for UNPROFOR alongside the MIFVs. Both plain cargo/personnel carriers and shelter carriers for the ARTHUR counter-battery radar and the Giraffe 40 air-defence radar. |
Light tactical vehicles / Light strike vehicles
| URO VAMTAC S3 | | Light tactical vehicle | Spain | 103+ | Variant includes FFR command & liaison vehicles, weapons carriers (heavy machine gun and AGL), gun tractors for the Mod 56 pack howitzer and SHORAD platforms with either the Igla Dzhigit twin-launcher or Thales RapidRanger launcher. |
| Cendana Auto 4x4 | | Light tactical vehicle | Malaysia | 267+ (Note: At the beginning; from the total of 207 units of all variant, 72 units were the Mortar Transporter. In 2024, it is confirmed that the army has increased the order from 72 units to 132 units of the Mortar Transporter bringing the total number of 267 units of all variant.) | Variant includes 70 FFR command & liaison vehicles, 16 SF-21X special operations forces mobility vehicles, 49 weapons carriers (heavy machine gun, AGL and ATGM) and 132 MT-815 mortar transports for the Tecnesis 3000 81 mm mortar. |
| Weststar GK-M1/M2 | | Light tactical vehicle | Malaysia | 238+ | Variant includes FFR command & liaison vehicles, weapons carriers (heavy machine gun and AGL) and air defence platforms with the Thales RapidRover launcher. |
| Agrale Marruá | | Light strike vehicle | Brazil | 163+ | Locally known as Tedung (Cobra). 83 units with heavy machine gun, 80 units with AGL. |
| Mercedes-Benz G-Class | | Light strike vehicle | Germany | 91+ | 32 units armed with a single 12.7 mm M2HB heavy machine gun, 34 units with the 40 mm Mark 19 AGL, 12 units with the Metis-M ATGM. |
| Glover Webb Hornet | | Light strike vehicle | United Kingdom | unknown | Armed with a single 12.7 mm M2HB heavy machine gun and a 7.62mm Manroy GPMG forward and a 40 mm Mark 19 AGL on the cargo bed. |
All terrain mobility vehicles / Scramblers
| Argo Frontier 650 | | All terrain mobility vehicle | Canada | 7 | |
| Supacat ATMP | | All terrain mobility vehicle | United Kingdom | 17 | Designated as Supacat 6x6 Drop Zone Recovery. |
| Can-Am Maverick | | All terrain mobility vehicle | Canada | 100 | Locally known as Kala (Scorpion). |
| TGB Blade 600 LTX EPS | | All terrain mobility vehicle | Taiwan | 57 | 27 units for first batch and 30 units for second batch. |
| Kawasaki KLX250S | | Scrambler | Japan | 378 | |
| WMoto SXR 300 | | Scrambler | Malaysia | 70 | |
| Voge 300 Rally | | Scrambler | China | unknown | |
| Talaria Sting R MX4 | | Scrambler | China | 45 | |
| Surron Light Bee X | | Scrambler | China | 45 | |
Multiple launch rocket systems
| Astros II MLRS | | Multiple launch rocket artillery system | Brazil | 36 | Can launch either SS-30 127 mm unitary HE rockets (32/launcher), SS-40 180 mm submunition-carrying rockets (16/launcher), SS-80 extended-range rockets (4/launcher) or SS-09TS reduced-range training rockets. |
Howitzers
| CAESAR Mk I | | 155 mm L/52 self-propelled howitzer | France | 0+(18) | Signed during Eurosatory 2026. Will be assemble locally by Advanced Defence Systems Sdn. Bhd. (ADSSB). |
| Denel G5 Mk.III | | 155 mm L/45 towed howitzer | South Africa | 28 | Upgraded with new Integrated Fire Control System (IFCS) and other related components by Advanced Defence Systems Sdn. Bhd. (ADSSB). |
| OTO Melara Mod 56 | | 105 mm towed howitzer | Italy | 110 | |
| LG1 Mk III | | 105 mm towed howitzer | France | 18+(36) | Assembled locally by Advanced Defence Systems Sdn. Bhd. (ADSSB). First 18 units used exclusively by the 1st Regiment Royal Artillery or 1 RAD (Para) headquartered at Terendak, Melaka. LOI signed as at November 2026 for additional 36 units. |
| M102 | | 105 mm saluting gun | United States | 40 | Used exclusively by the 41st Battery (Ceremonial), headquartered at Sungai Buloh, Selangor. |
Combat engineering vehicles
| MID-M | | Armoured engineering vehicle | Poland | 3 | |
| PMC Leguan | | Armoured vehicle launched bridge | Poland | 5 | |
| Vickers BR-90 | | Vehicle launched bridge | United Kingdom | 3 | Carried on MAN SX2000 32.403VFAEG 8x8 trucks. |
| CNIM PFM | | Vehicle launched bridge | France | 2 | |
| PMP | | Floating pontoon bridge | China | 2 | Carried on Shaanxi CTZ-19X 8x8 trucks. |
| Mercedes-Benz Actros HGMS | | 8x8 heavy ground mobility system | Germany | unknown | Prime mover for the Faun Trackway. |
| MAN TMSS | | 8x8 tactical mobility support system | Germany | 2 | Prime mover for the Faun Trackway. |
Recovery vehicles
| WZT-4 | | Armoured recovery vehicle | Poland | 6 | |
| K288A1 ARV | | Armoured recovery vehicle | South Korea | 4 | Fitted with outriggers, a 3.5-tonne crane and a 10-tonne class recovery winch which can be double rigged for 20-tonne capacity. |
| ACV-300 Adnan | | Armoured recovery vehicle | Turkey; Malaysia | 15 | Both Fitter and Armoured Recovery variants acquired. |
| AV8 Gempita | | 8x8 armoured heavy recovery vehicle | Malaysia | 9 | |
| Volvo FMX AHRV | | 8x8 heavy recovery vehicle | Sweden | 9 | 2 delivered in 2018 and 7 delivered in 2023. |
| Iveco Trakker 440 HRV | | 6x6 heavy recovery vehicle | Italy | 4 | |
| Volvo FMX LRV | | 4x4 light recovery vehicle | Sweden | 9 | |
| Isuzu FTS33H LRV | | 4x4 light recovery vehicle | Japan | 13 | Designated as the 6 Ton 4x4 HICOM Light Recovery Vehicle. |
| Mercedes-Benz L-Series LRV | | 4x4 light recovery vehicle | Germany | 22 | Based on the LA911 chassis. |
| Mildef LFRV | | 4x4 light forward repair vehicle | Malaysia | 13 | Designated as the Light Forward Repair Vehicle, replacing the previous Defender 110-based LFRV. Based on the Toyota Hilux chassis. |
Command, control and communications vehicles
| Scania P360 | | 6x6 command centre platform | Sweden | 4 | Carries a demountable containerised command, control and communications centre. |
| Tectran AV-UCF | | Armoured artillery fire control vehicle | Brazil | 6 | Provides indirect fire correction and radar projectile tracking for ASTROS II batteries. Fitted with the Rheinmetall FieldGuard radar. |
| Tactran AV-VBL | | Armoured battery command vehicle | Brazil | 10 | Provides battery fire direction and coordination. Based on the Tectran VBT-2028 6×6 chassis. |
| Unimog | | Mobile satellite communications centre | Germany | 13 | Fitted with the Kongsberg multi-channel radio system (MRCS) and Getac X500 terminals. |
| Iveco VM90 | | Mobile satellite communications centre | Italy | 4 | 40.12WM variant. Designated as Truck, 2 Ton 4x4 HICOM IVECO Satellite Communication. |
| Iveco Daily | | Mobile satellite communications centre | Italy | 25 | 22 units fitted with the Kongsberg multi-channel radio system (MRCS) and Getac X500 terminals. 3 units designated as Tactical Electronic Warfare (TEW) shelter carriers. |
| Toyota Land Cruiser Prado | | Mobile satellite communications station | Japan | unknown | Designated as Communication on the Pause (COTP). Fitted with a General Dynamics C135M X-band satellite communications antenna (Measat-3b), Research Concepts Inc. RC3000 Antenna Control Unit, Advantech 100W X-band Build-Up Converter, Norsat X1000HA Low Noise Block converter, Viasat modem, Xiplink IP accelerator and Cisco VoIP. |
Logistics vehicles
| Iveco EuroTrakker 380 | | Prime mover / tank transporter | Italy | 28 | |
| Scania P500 | | Prime mover / tank transporter | Sweden | 5 | |
| Volvo FL7 | | Prime mover / tank transporter | Sweden | unknown | |
| Scania R460 | | 8×8 heavy expanded mobility tactical truck | Sweden | 3 | Designated as Heavy Expanded Mobility Tactical Truck - Multi Cargo Palletised System (HEMTT-MCPLS). |
| Oshkosh HEMTT | | 8×8 heavy expanded mobility tactical truck | United States | unknown | |
| Dongfeng HEMTT | | 8×8 heavy expanded mobility tactical truck | China | 3 | |
| MAN TG MIL | | Transport truck | Germany | unknown 14 32 | 8x8 MAN TG Ground Master 200 radar carrier. 6x6 MAN TG 10 tonne. Delivered in 2026. 4x4 MAN TGM and TGS GS in 3 tonne and 5 tonne variants. |
| Mercedes-Benz NG | | Transport truck | Germany | unknown | |
| Tatra 815 | | Transport truck | Czech Republic | unknown | 5 tonne GS truck. |
| Iveco EuroCargo | | Transport truck | Italy | 196 | 150 3 tonne GS and 12 5 tonne GS trucks in service. 4 new units were ordered in 2023 and another 30 in 2024. All delivered in 2026. |
| Isuzu F Series | | Transport truck | Japan | 39 | 29 GS variants were initially purchased, followed by another 10 vehicles in 2014. Designated as Multipurpose Inventory Mobile Vehicles (MIMV). |
| DefTech Handalan | | Transport truck | Malaysia | 2,674 | |
| AMDAC | | Transport truck | Malaysia | unknown | License manufactured Roman and DAC trucks with Euro3 engines. 4x4 and 6x6 trucks were locally produced until the turn of the millennium. Variants include: 33.400DFA Heavy Recovery, 32.360DFA Water Tanker, 26.410DFAES Ribbon Bridge Carrier, 26.360DFA G5 Gun Tractor, 22.360DFA G5 Gun Tractor, 16.310FAEG Expandable Shop Van, 15.240FAEG Oerlikon Gun Tractor (GAPU). |
| Mowag Duro II | | Transport truck | Switzerland | 57 | Locally assembled by DefTech. Designated as Truck, 2 Tonne 6x6 HICOM DURO High Mobility Troop Transporter (HMTT) & High Mobility Command Vehicle (HMCV). Rarely seen since the mid-2010s. |
| Pinzgauer multi-purpose vehicle | | Transport truck | Austria | 330 | Locally assembled by DefTech. 68 units of the 716M Soft Top (2 Tonne 4x4 Pinzgauer Gun Tractor) for towing the Mod 56. 164 units of the 718M (2 Tonne 6x6 Pinzgauer Mortar Carrier c/w Ammunition Trailer). Experienced significant sustainment and readiness issues leading to their premature retirement in the mid-2010s. |
| Iveco Daily | | Transport truck | Italy | 36 | Gun tractors for the Mod 56. |
| Iveco VM90 | | Field ambulance | Italy | 25 | 40.10WM variant. Designated as Truck, 2 Tonne 4x4 HICOM IVECO M4010 Field Ambulance. |
| Ford F550 | | Field ambulance | United States | 18 | |
| Mitsubishi Canter | | Field ambulance | Japan | unknown | |
| Land Rover Defender 110 | | Multi-purpose vehicle | United Kingdom | 3,600 | Largely replaced by the Weststar GK-M1/M2 and a variety of commercial light utility vehicles (see below). |
| DefTech / Weststar / Cendana Auto / High Point Worldwide / Go Auto GS Cargo | | Light utility vehicle | Malaysia | 493 | 365 in service as of 2021. 128 new vehicles supplied in two batch (46+82) in 2025. Designated as 1 Tonne GS Cargo Truck. |
| Toyota Hilux | | Light utility vehicle | Japan | unknown | Designated as 1 Tonne GS Cargo Truck. |
| Isuzu D-Max | | Light utility vehicle | Japan | unknown | Designated as 1 Tonne GS Cargo Truck. |
| Mitsubishi Triton | | Light utility vehicle | Japan | unknown | Designated as 1 Tonne GS Cargo Truck. |
| Ford Ranger | | Light utility vehicle | United States | unknown | |
Miscellaneous
| SJ-09 | | Training tank | Poland | 1 | |
Watercraft
| Powercraft Marine MAC | | Medium assault craft | Malaysia | unknown | 15 meter medium assault craft. |
| Powecraft Marine LCD | | Landing craft (diving support) | Malaysia | unknown | 13 meter landing craft (diving support). |
| MRI Technologies Viper | | Interceptor boat | Malaysia | 10+ | 8.18 meter interceptor boat powered by two 250 hp Yamaha outboard motors. Top speed of 50 kn. |
| MRI Technologies Rover Stingray | | Interceptor boat | Malaysia | 10+ | 9.85 meter interceptor boat powered by two 250 hp Yamaha outboard motors. Top speed of 40 kn. |
| MSET FIC ALUM 1300 RHFB | | Interceptor boat | Malaysia | 9+ | 12.20 meter interceptor powered by two 370 hp Mercury VW V8 engines. Top speed of 40 kn. |
| MSET Rigid Inflatable Boat Tornado | | Rigid hull inflatable boat | Malaysia | 12+ | 11.5 meter boat based on MSET RFB 1150 FAC powered by two 300 hp Suzuki outboard motors. Top speed of 50 kn. |
| Offshore Raiding Craft | | Troop-carrying rigid hull raiding craft | Malaysia | 14+ | Used by the Amphibious Company of the 10th Para Brigade. |
| Assault Boat | | Assault boat | Malaysia | 100+ | |
| RXT-X 300CV | | Jet ski | Canada | 6 | |
| Airlift Kaiman | | Hovercraft | Australia | 6 | |
Unmanned aerial vehicles
| FlyEye | | Tactical unmanned aerial vehicle | Poland | unknown | |
| CW-25D | | Tactical unmanned aerial vehicle | China | 6 | 6 drones and 2 command vehicles. |
| CW-15 | | Tactical unmanned aerial vehicle | China | unknown | |
| CW-007 | | Tactical unmanned aerial vehicle | China | unknown | |
| Aerobo Wing AS-VTO2 | | Tactical unmanned aerial vehicle | Japan | 6 | |
| Schiebel Camcopter S-100 | | Tactical unmanned aerial vehicle (VTOL) | Austria | unknown | |
| DJI Matrice | | Tactical unmanned aerial vehicle (VTOL) | China | unknown | DJI Matrice 210 version in service. |
| DJI Mavic | | Tactical unmanned aerial vehicle (VTOL) | China | unknown | DJI Mavic 2 version in service. |
| SkyRanger R60 | | Tactical unmanned aerial vehicle (VTOL) | Canada | unknown | |

=== Malaysian Army Aviation ===
| Aircraft | Image | Role | Variant | Origin | Quantity | Notes |
Helicopters
| MD 500 Defender | | Light attack helicopter | MD530G | United States | 6 | Equipped with the Thales Scorpion helmet-mounted display and a L3Harris Wescam MX-10 FLIR turret. (Note: While the MX-10 can laser designate AGM-114 Hellfires as well as APKWS II and FZ275 laser guided rockets, none of the three have been known to be in operation with the Malaysian Army.) The outboard hardpoints can mount two of the following: FN HMP400 12.7 mm gun pods, FN RMP combined 3-round 70 mm rocket/heavy machine gun pods, Thales FZ220 7-round 70 mm rocket pods. Optionally, the inboard hardpoints can mount two 7.62 mm Dillon Aero M134D miniguns, feeding from two 3000-round ammunition containers in the rear cabin. |
| AgustaWestland AW109 | | Scout / Utility helicopter | A109LUH | Italy | 10 | Armed with either a cabin-mounted 7.62 mm Dillon Aero M134D minigun, or two 20 mm Nexter NC621 gun pods and/or Thales FZ220 7-round 70 mm rocket pods for area suppression. |
| AgustaWestland AW149 | | Utility helicopter | | Italy | 0+(4) | 4 on order. Delivery in 2027. |

=== Royal Malaysian Navy ===
| Class | Image | Type | Ships | Origin | Quantity | Notes |
Submarines
| Perdana Menteri | | Submarine | KD Tunku Abdul Rahman KD Tun Abdul Razak | France | 2 | Armament: Black Shark heavyweight torpedoes; Exocet SM39 missiles |
Frigates
| Maharaja Lela | | Frigate | KD Maharaja Lela KD Raja Muda Nala KD Sharif Mashor KD Mat Salleh KD Tok Janggut | France; Malaysia | 0+(5) | Originally 6 ships planned but 1 cancelled in 2023. Armament: 1 × Bofors 57 mm gun; 2 × MSI DS30M 30 mm gun; 16 × VL MICA in Sylver VLS; 8 × Atmaca SSM; 2 × triple J+S torpedo launcher |
| Lekiu | | Frigate | KD Jebat KD Lekiu | United Kingdom | 2 | Planned upgraded with new SAM and SSM. Armament: 1 × Bofors 57 mm gun; 2 × MSI DS30B 30 mm gun; 16 × Sea Wolf in VLS; 8 × Exocet MM40 Block 2 SSM; 2 × triple Eurotorp B515 |
Corvettes
| Tunku | | Corvette | KD Tunku Laksamana Abdul Jalil KD Raja Laut KD Tunku Osman Jewa | Turkey | 0+(3) | 3 on order. Armament: 1 × Oto Melara 76 mm gun; 1 × Aselsan SMASH 30 mm gun; 16 × K-SAAM in VLS; 8 × Atmaca SSM |
| Kasturi | | Corvette | KD Kasturi KD Lekir | Germany | 2 | Armament: 1 × Bofors 57 mm gun; 2 × MSI DS30B 30 mm gun; 8 × Exocet MM40 Block 2 SSM; 2 × triple Eurotorp B515 |
| Laksamana | | Corvette | KD Laksamana Hang Nadim KD Laksamana Muhammad Amin | Italy | 2 | Formerly missile corvette. Armament: 1 × Oto Melara 76 mm gun; 1 × DARDO/Breda 40 mm CIWS |
Offshore patrol vessels
| Kedah | | Offshore patrol vessel | KD Kedah KD Pahang KD Perak KD Terengganu KD Kelantan KD Selangor | Germany; Malaysia | 6 | Armament: 1 × Oto Melara 76 mm gun; 1 × Breda-Mauser 30 mm gun |
| Keris | | Offshore patrol vessel | KD Keris KD Sundang KD Badik KD Rencong | China | 4 | Armament: 1 × H/PJ-17 30 mm gun; 2 × 12.7 mm Browning M2HB machine gun |
Fast attack craft
| Perdana | | Gunboat | KD Perdana KD Serang KD Ganas KD Ganyang | France | 4 | Formerly missile boat. Armament: 1 × Bofors 57 mm gun; 1 × Bofors 40 mm gun |
| Handalan | | Gunboat | KD Handalan KD Perkasa KD Gempita | Sweden | 3 | Formerly missile boat. Armament: 1 × Bofors 57 mm gun; 1 × Bofors 40 mm gun |
| Jerung | | Gunboat | KD Jerung KD Todak KD Paus KD Yu KD Baung | Germany; Malaysia | 5 | Armament: 1 × Bofors 57 mm gun; 1 × Bofors 40 mm gun |
| Kris | | Gunboat | KD Sri Perlis KD Sri Johor KD Sri Sabah KD Sri Sarawak | United Kingdom | 4 | Armament: 1 × Bofors 40 mm gun; 2 × 12.7 mm Browning M2HB machine gun |
| Sri Tiga | | Fast troop vessel | KD Sri Tiga KD Sri Gaya | Malaysia | 2 | Armament: 1 × 20 mm gun; 2 × 12.7 mm Browning M2HB machine gun |
Fast interceptor craft / Rigid-hulled inflatable boat / Jet ski
| CB90 | | Fast interceptor craft | | Sweden | 17 | 5 units CB90, 12 units CB90HEX. Armament: 3 × 12.7 mm Browning M2HB machine gun |
| G2000 FIC 18M | | Fast interceptor craft | | Malaysia | 19 | 6 units MK I,13 units MK II. Armament: 1 × 12.7 mm Sentinel RCWS; 2 × 7.62 mm machine gun |
| Pengawal | | Fast interceptor craft | | Malaysia | 2 | Transferred from Malaysian Maritime Enforcement Agency. Armament: 2 × 7.62 mm machine gun |
| Sandakan Jaya Teknik MPB | | Fast interceptor craft | | Malaysia | 4 | Armament: 2 × 7.62 mm machine gun |
| Ibrahim IC 1170 | | Fast interceptor craft | | Malaysia | 1 | Armament: 1 × 7.62 mm machine gun |
| Rigid hull inflatable boat | | Rigid hull inflatable boat | 12.02m P38-class 7.62m MSET-class Silver Breeze-class | Malaysia | unknown | Armament: 1-2 × 12.7 mm Browning M2HB machine gun |
| RXT-X 300CV | | Jet ski | Sea-Doo RXT-X 300CV | Canada | unknown | Armament: 1 × 5.56 mm FN Minimi machine gun installed on rear tripod. |
Mine countermeasure vessels
| Mahamiru | | Minesweeper | KD Mahamiru KD Jerai KD Ledang KD Kinabalu | Italy | 4 | Armament: 1 × Bofors 40 mm gun; 2 × 12.7 mm Browning M2HB machine gun |
Diving support vessels
| | | Diving support vessel | | Japan | 0+(1) | Sponsored by Japan under Official Security Assistance (OSA). |
Amphibious warfare ships / Multi-role support ships
| Sri Indera Sakti | | Multi-role support ship | KD Sri Indera Sakti KD Mahawangsa | Germany | 2 | Armament: 1-2 × Bofors 57 mm gun; 2 × Oerlikon 20 mm gun |
Auxiliary ships
| Bunga Mas Lima | | Auxiliary ship | KA Bunga Mas Lima | Malaysia | 1 | 132 meter ship with combat and support capabilities. |
| Tun Azizan | | Auxiliary ship | KA Tun Azizan | Malaysia | 1 | 102 meter ship with combat and support capabilities. |
Training ships
| Gagah Samudera | | Training ship | KD Gagah Samudera KD Teguh Samudera | South Korea; Malaysia | 2 | Armament: 1 × MSI DS30B 30 mm gun; 2 × 12.7 mm Browning M2HB machine gun |
| Tunas Samudera | | Training ship | KLD Tunas Samudera | United Kingdom | 1 | |
Submarine rescue ships
| MV Mega Bakti | | Submarine rescue ship | MV Mega Bakti | Singapore | 1 | |
Hydrographic survey vessels
| Perantau | | Hydro ship | KD Perantau | Germany | 1 | |
| MV Dayang Sari | | Hydro ship | MV Dayang Sari | Malaysia | 1 | |
| MV Aishah | | Hydro ship | MV Aishah | Malaysia | 1 | |
| AMIN 1600HSV | | Hydro ship | - | Malaysia | 2 | |
Tugboats
| - | | Tugboat | KTD Penyu | Japan | 1 | |
| - | | Tugboat | Tunda Satu | Malaysia | 1 | |
Unmanned surface vessels
| Swift Sea-Stalker | | Unmanned surface vessel | | United States | 1 | |

=== Royal Malaysian Navy Aviation ===
| Aircraft | Image | Type | Variant | Origin | Quantity | Notes |
Helicopters
| Westland Lynx | | Anti-submarine warfare | Super Lynx 300 | United Kingdom | 5 | Equipped with torpedoes or MBDA Sea Skua anti-ship missile and also use as OTHT. M501-03 mishap (emergency landing) in 2025. |
| Eurocopter Fennec | | Surface surveillance | AS 555SN | France | 4 | Combat and OTHT capable. M502-03 mishap (emergency landing) in 2021. M502-06 crashed (mid-air collision) in 2024. |
| AgustaWestland AW139 | | Utility | | Italy | 2+(2) | Transport and utility. M503-03 crashed (mid-air collision) in 2024. Two more acquired in 2024. |
Unmanned aerial vehicles
| Scan Eagle | | Tactical unmanned aerial vehicle | | United States | 18 | First 6 units delivered in 2020 and the rest in 2021. |
| Aerobo Wing AS-VTO2 | | Tactical unmanned aerial vehicle | | Japan | 6 | |

=== Royal Malaysian Air Force ===
| Aircraft | Image | Type | Variant | Origin | Quantity | Notes |
Combat aircraft
| Boeing F/A-18 Hornet | | Multirole fighter | F/A-18D | United States | 7 | |
| Sukhoi Su-30 | | Multirole fighter | Sukhoi Su-30MKM | Russia | 18 | |
| KAI T-50 Golden Eagle | | Light multirole | FA-50M | South Korea | 2+(16) | 2 delivered, 16 on order. |
| BAE Hawk 200 | | Light multirole | Hawk 208 | United Kingdom | 12 | |
Maritime patrol aircraft
| ATR 72 | | Maritime patrol | ATR 72MP | Italy | 0+(2) | 2 on order. |
| CASA CN-235 | | Maritime patrol | CN-235-220MSA | Spain; Indonesia | 3 | |
| Super King Air | | Maritime patrol | 200 | United States | 2 | |
Tanker
| KC-130 Hercules | | Aerial refueling | KC-130T | United States | 4 | |
Transport aircraft
| Airbus A319 | | VIP | | Germany | 1 | |
| Airbus A320 | | VIP | | Germany | 1 | |
| Bombardier Global Express | | VIP | | Canada | 1 | |
| Airbus A400M Atlas | | Aerial refuelling / Military transport | A400M | European Union | 4 | |
| C-130 Hercules | | Military transport | C-130H | United States | 10 | |
| CASA CN-235 | | Military transport | CN-235-200/220 | Spain; Indonesia | 4 | |
Helicopters
| Sikorsky UH-60 Black Hawk | | Utility / VIP | S-70A-34 | United States | 2 | |
| AgustaWestland AW139 | | Search and rescue / Utility | | Italy | 8 | |
| AgustaWestland AW149 | | Search and rescue / Utility | | Italy | 0+(12) | 12 on order. |
| Eurocopter EC725 Caracal | | Search and rescue / Utility | | France | 12+(4) | 4 on order. |
Trainer aircraft
| BAE Hawk 100 | | Advanced jet trainer | Hawk 108 | United Kingdom | 4 | |
| Super King Air | | Basic trainer | 350i | United States | 2 | |
| Pilatus PC-7 | | Basic trainer | MkII | Switzerland | 20 | |
| Airbus Helicopters H120 | | Rotorcraft trainer | H120 | France | 5 | |
Unmanned aerial vehicles
| TAI Anka | | Surveillance / Unmanned combat aerial vehicle | Anka-S | Turkey | 3 | |

== Attire ==
List of current camouflage patterns and uniforms
| Branch | Camouflage pattern | Image | Picture |
|---|---|---|---|
| Army | The Uniform No. 5 Fabrik Celoreng Corak Digital Tentera Darat is used by army in 2013. The Malay Tigerstripe Woodland pattern but with earth-brown stripes on a light green and sand-coloured background. | | |
| Navy | Introduced in 2016 - standard blue-grey for shipboard and all operationals. | | |
| Air Force | No.4. Digital Camouflage Pattern. Introduced in 2016 | | |

== See also ==
- List of equipment of the Malaysian Army
- List of equipment of the Royal Malaysian Navy
- List of equipment of the Royal Malaysian Air Force
- List of aircraft of the Malaysian Armed Forces
- List of equipment of the Malaysian Maritime Enforcement Agency
- List of vehicles of the Royal Malaysian Police
- List of police firearms in Malaysia
