= List of equipment of the Royal Malaysian Navy =

Malaysian military equipment list

The equipment of the Royal Malaysian Navy can be subdivided into: ships, aircraft, radar, guns, munitions, firearms and attire. Commissioned RMN ships carry the prefix KD (Malay : Kapal Di-Raja, literally "Royal Ship"), which is equivalent to "His Majesty's Ship" in English. Sailing ships however, carry the KLD prefix (Kapal Layar Di-Raja), meaning "His Majesty's Sailing Ship".

== Ships ==
Class	Image	Type	Ships	Origin	Quantity	Notes
Submarines
Perdana Menteri		Submarine	KD Tunku Abdul Rahman KD Tun Abdul Razak	France	2	Armament: Black Shark heavyweight torpedoes; Exocet SM39 missiles
Frigates
Maharaja Lela		Frigate	KD Maharaja Lela KD Raja Muda Nala KD Sharif Mashor KD Mat Salleh KD Tok Janggut	France; Malaysia	0+(5)	Originally 6 ships planned but 1 cancelled in 2023. Armament: 1 × Bofors 57 mm gun; 2 × MSI DS30M 30 mm gun; 16 × VL MICA in Sylver VLS; 8 × Atmaca SSM; 2 × triple J+S torpedo launcher
Lekiu		Frigate	KD Jebat KD Lekiu	United Kingdom	2	Planned upgraded with new SAM and SSM. Armament: 1 × Bofors 57 mm gun; 2 × MSI DS30B 30 mm gun; 16 × Sea Wolf in VLS; 8 × Exocet MM40 Block 2 SSM; 2 × triple Eurotorp B515
Corvettes
Tunku		Corvette	KD Tunku Laksamana Abdul Jalil KD Raja Laut KD Tunku Osman Jewa	Turkey	0+(3)	3 on order. Armament: 1 × Oto Melara 76 mm gun; 1 × Aselsan SMASH 30 mm gun; 16 × K-SAAM in VLS; 8 × Atmaca SSM
Kasturi		Corvette	KD Kasturi KD Lekir	Germany	2	Armament: 1 × Bofors 57 mm gun; 2 × MSI DS30B 30 mm gun; 8 × Exocet MM40 Block 2 SSM; 2 × triple Eurotorp B515
Laksamana		Corvette	KD Laksamana Hang Nadim KD Laksamana Muhammad Amin	Italy	2	Formerly missile corvette. Armament: 1 × Oto Melara 76 mm gun; 1 × DARDO/Breda 40 mm CIWS
Offshore patrol vessels
Kedah		Offshore patrol vessel	KD Kedah KD Pahang KD Perak KD Terengganu KD Kelantan KD Selangor	Germany; Malaysia	6	Armament: 1 × Oto Melara 76 mm gun; 1 × Breda-Mauser 30 mm gun
Keris		Offshore patrol vessel	KD Keris KD Sundang KD Badik KD Rencong	China	4	Armament: 1 × H/PJ-17 30 mm gun; 2 × 12.7 mm Browning M2HB machine gun
Fast attack craft
Perdana		Gunboat	KD Perdana KD Serang KD Ganas KD Ganyang	France	4	Formerly missile boat. Armament: 1 × Bofors 57 mm gun; 1 × Bofors 40 mm gun
Handalan		Gunboat	KD Handalan KD Perkasa KD Gempita	Sweden	3	Formerly missile boat. Armament: 1 × Bofors 57 mm gun; 1 × Bofors 40 mm gun
Jerung		Gunboat	KD Jerung KD Todak KD Paus KD Yu KD Baung	Germany; Malaysia	5	Armament: 1 × Bofors 57 mm gun; 1 × Bofors 40 mm gun
Kris		Gunboat	KD Sri Perlis KD Sri Johor KD Sri Sabah KD Sri Sarawak	United Kingdom	4	Armament: 1 × Bofors 40 mm gun; 2 × 12.7 mm Browning M2HB machine gun
Sri Tiga		Fast troop vessel	KD Sri Tiga KD Sri Gaya	Malaysia	2	Armament: 1 × 20 mm gun; 2 × 12.7 mm Browning M2HB machine gun
Fast interceptor craft / Rigid-hulled inflatable boat / Jet ski
CB90		Fast interceptor craft		Sweden	17	5 units CB90, 12 units CB90HEX. Armament: 3 × 12.7 mm Browning M2HB machine gun
G2000 FIC 18M		Fast interceptor craft		Malaysia	19	6 units MK I,13 units MK II. Armament: 1 × 12.7 mm Sentinel RCWS; 2 × 7.62 mm machine gun
Pengawal		Fast interceptor craft		Malaysia	2	Transferred from Malaysian Maritime Enforcement Agency. Armament: 2 × 7.62 mm machine gun
Sandakan Jaya Teknik MPB		Fast interceptor craft		Malaysia	4	Armament: 2 × 7.62 mm machine gun
Ibrahim IC 1170		Fast interceptor craft		Malaysia	1	Armament: 1 × 7.62 mm machine gun
Rigid hull inflatable boat		Rigid hull inflatable boat	12.02m P38-class 7.62m MSET-class Silver Breeze-class	Malaysia	unknown	Armament: 1-2 × 12.7 mm Browning M2HB machine gun
RXT-X 300CV		Jet ski	Sea-Doo RXT-X 300CV	Canada	unknown	Armament: 1 × 5.56 mm FN Minimi machine gun installed on rear tripod.
Mine counter-measure vessels
Mahamiru		Minesweeper	KD Mahamiru KD Jerai KD Ledang KD Kinabalu	Italy	4	Armament: 1 × Bofors 40 mm gun; 2 × 12.7 mm Browning M2HB machine gun
Diving support vessels
		Diving support vessel		Japan	0+(1)	Sponsored by Japan under Official Security Assistance (OSA).
Amphibious warfare ships / Multi-role support ships
Sri Indera Sakti		Multi-role support ship	KD Sri Indera Sakti KD Mahawangsa	Germany	2	Armament: 1-2 × Bofors 57 mm gun; 2 × Oerlikon 20 mm gun
Auxiliary ships
Bunga Mas Lima		Auxiliary ship	KA Bunga Mas Lima	Malaysia	1	132 meter ship with combat and support capabilities.
Tun Azizan		Auxiliary ship	KA Tun Azizan	Malaysia	1	102 meter ship with combat and support capabilities.
Training ships
Gagah Samudera		Training ship	KD Gagah Samudera KD Teguh Samudera	South Korea; Malaysia	2	Armament: 1 × MSI DS30B 30 mm gun; 2 × 12.7 mm Browning M2HB machine gun
Tunas Samudera		Training ship	KLD Tunas Samudera	United Kingdom	1	
Submarine rescue ships
MV Mega Bakti		Submarine rescue ship	MV Mega Bakti	Singapore	1	
Hydrographic survey vessels
Perantau		Hydro ship	KD Perantau	Germany	1	
MV Dayang Sari		Hydro ship	MV Dayang Sari	Malaysia	1	
MV Aishah		Hydro ship	MV Aishah	Malaysia	1	
AMIN 1600HSV		Hydro ship	-	Malaysia	2	
Tugboats
-		Tugboat	KTD Penyu	Japan	1	
-		Tugboat	Tunda Satu	Malaysia	1	
Unmanned surface vessels
Swift Sea-Stalker		Unmanned surface vessel		United States	1	

== Aircraft ==
Aircraft	Image	Type	Variant	Origin	Quantity	Notes
Helicopters
Westland Lynx		Anti-submarine warfare	Super Lynx 300	United Kingdom	5	Equipped with torpedoes or MBDA Sea Skua anti-ship missile and also use as OTHT. M501-03 mishap (emergency landing) in 2025.
Eurocopter Fennec		Surface surveillance	AS 555SN	France	4	Combat and OTHT capable. M502-03 mishap (emergency landing) in 2021. M502-06 crashed (mid-air collision) in 2024.
AgustaWestland AW139		Utility	AW139HOM	Italy	2+(2)	Transport and utility. M503-03 crashed (mid-air collision) in 2024. Two more acquired in 2024.
Unmanned aerial vehicles
Boeing Insitu ScanEagle		Tactical unmanned aerial vehicle		United States	18	First 6 units delivered in 2020 and the rest in 2021.
Aerobo Wing AS-VTO2		Tactical unmanned aerial vehicle		Japan	6	

== Radar ==
Radar	Image	Type	Origin	Quantity	Notes
Radar
Thales Nederland SMART-S Mk.II		Search radar	Netherlands	5	Installed on Maharaja Lela class frigate.
Ericsson SEA-GIRAFFE		Search radar	Sweden	2	Installed on Lekiu class frigate.
Aselsan CENK-S AESA		Search radar	Turkey	3	To be installed on LMS Batch 2.
DA-08		Search radar	Netherlands	4	Installed on Lekiu class frigate and Kasturi class corvette.
RAN-12		Search radar	Italy	2	Installed on Laksamana class corvette.
TRS-3D		Search radar	Germany	6	Installed on Kedah class OPV.
SR-47AG		Search radar	China	4	Installed on Keris class LMS.

== Guns ==
Gun	Image	Type	Origin	Quantity	Notes
Naval artillery guns
Oto Melara 76 mm gun		Gun	Italy	11	Compact and Super Rapid in service.
Bofors 57 mm gun		Gun	Sweden	24	Mk1, Mk2 and Mk3 in service.
Bofors 40 mm gun		Gun	Sweden	20	L/70 in service.
MSI DS30M 30 mm gun		Gun	United Kingdom	20	Mk2 in service.
Breda Mauser 30 mm gun		Gun	Italy	6	
SMASH 30 mm gun		Gun	Turkey	3	To be installed on LMS Batch 2.
H/PJ-17 30 mm gun		Gun	China	4	
Oerlikon 20 mm gun		Gun	Switzerland	6	
Close-in weapon systems
DARDO		Close-in weapon system	Italy	2	Installed on Laksamana class corvette.

== Munitions ==
Munition	Image	Type	Origin	Quantity	Notes
Air-to-surface missiles
Sea Skua		Air-to-surface missile	United Kingdom	50	Used by Westland Lynx helicopter.
Surface-to-air missiles
MICA		Guided missile system, Surface-to-air missile	France	29	To be installed on Maharaja Lela class frigate. 29 units odered in 2026 for the first batch. More to be order in the future.
K-SAAM		Guided missile system, Surface-to-air missile	South Korea	48	To be installed on LMS Batch 2. Ordered in 2026.
Sea Wolf		Guided missile system, Surface-to-air missile	United Kingdom	65	Used by Lekiu class frigate.
Anti-ship missiles and Land-attack cruise missiles
Exocet SM39		Anti-ship missile	France	40	SM39. Used by Scorpene class submarine.
Exocet MM40		Anti-ship missile	France	50	MM40 Block 2. Used by Lekiu class frigate and Kasturi class corvette.
Atmaca		Anti-ship missile	Turkey	24	To be installed on Maharaja Lela class frigate and LMS Batch 2. Ordered in 2026.
Torpedoes
A244-S		Torpedo	Italy	75	Used by Lekiu class frigate, Kasturi class corvette and Laksamana class corvette.
Black Shark		Torpedo	Italy	30	Used by Scorpene class submarine.

== Firearms ==
The standard weapon of all RMN personnel is Glock 17, Heckler & Koch P9S service pistols, M4 carbines, M16 rifles and FN MAG 58 general purpose machine guns. The RMN PASKAL units are often equipped with the most common specialised firearms including combat shotguns, submachine guns, assault rifles, carbines, sniper rifles, light machine guns and grenade-based weapons that are generally found in most counter-terrorist tactical teams. The following are some of the weapons of the RMN ground forces:

Firearm	Image	Type	Calibre	Variant	Origin	Notes
Pistols
Glock		Pistol	9×19mm Parabellum	Glock 17 Glock 18C Glock 19 Glock 26 Glock 34	Austria	Glock 17 is the standard service pistol for navy personnel. Glock 18C to Glock 34 is used by PASKAL.
HK45		Pistol	.45 ACP	HK45T	Germany	Limited service. Used by PASKAL.
Mk.23		Pistol	.45 ACP	Mk.23 Mod 0	Germany	Limited service. Used by PASKAL.
P9		Pistol	9×19mm Parabellum	P9S	Germany	Limited service.
P11		Underwater pistol	7.62×36mm	P11	Germany	Used by PASKAL.
P30		Pistol	9×19mm Parabellum	P30	Germany	Used by PASKAL.
SP1		Pistol	9×19mm Parabellum	SP1	South Africa	Limited service.
Canik TP9SF		Pistol	9×19mm Parabellum		Turkey	
Shotguns
FP6		Shotgun	12 bore	FP6	Italy	Used by PASKAL.
M870		Shotgun	12-gauge	M870	United States	Also used as a breaching shotgun.
M1100		Shotgun	12-gauge	M1100	United States	Used by PASKAL.
Submachine guns
Beretta PMX		Submachine gun	9×19mm Parabellum		Italy	
MP5		Submachine gun	9×19mm Parabellum	MP5A5 MPK-A5 MP5N MP5SD6 MLI	Germany	The weapon comes in multiple variants, from the standard MP5A5, MP5K-A5, MP5N and the suppressed MP5SD6. Used by PASKAL in night operations, close quarters (especially VBSS/GOPLATS), hostage rescue and escort. A standard MP5A5 has been fitted with an RM Equipment M203PI grenade launcher.
MP7		Submachine gun	HK 4.6×30mm	MP7A1 MP7A2	Germany	Used by PASKAL.
UMP		Submachine gun	.45 ACP	UMP45	Germany	Used by PASKAL.
P90		Submachine gun	FN 5.7×28mm	P90	Belgium	Used by PASKAL.
Assault rifles
M4		Carbine	5.56×45mm NATO	M4 M4A1 SOPMOD	United States; Malaysia	Standard service rifle manufactured locally by SME Ordnance for Malaysian Armed Forces. Equipped with SOPMOD kit features a shortened quick-detachable M203 grenade launcher and leaf sight, an Insight Technologies AN/PEQ-2A visible laser/infrared designator, along with ECOS-N optical sight (a variant of the Aimpoint CompM2) and a night vision sight. Used by PASKAL.
Steyr AUG		Assault rifle	5.56×45 mm NATO	AUG A1	Austria; Malaysia	Made under licence by SME Ordnance, now in reserve and largely replaced by M4A1s.
M16		Assault rifle	5.56×45mm NATO	M16A1 M16A2	United States	Still in used reservists or ceremonial only. Used by PASKAL. Limited service.
G36		Assault rifle	5.56×45mm NATO	G36C G36E G36KE	Germany	Used by PASKAL.
HK416		Carbine	5.56×45mm NATO	D10RS D14.5RS D20RS	Germany	Used by PASKAL.
M8		Assault rifle	5.56×45mm NATO	XM8 Compact XM8 Carbine XM8 AR/DMR XM8 LMG	Germany; United States	Used by PASKAL. Available in four variants: the XM8 compact carbine or PDW, XM8 carbine, automatic rifle, designated marksmen rifle and light machine gun.
AK-100		Assault rifle	5.56×45mm NATO	AK-102	Russia	Used by PASKAL. Limited service.
Sniper rifles
AR-50		Anti-materiel rifle	.50 BMG	AR-50	United States	Used by PASKAL.
AW50		Anti-materiel rifle	.50 BMG	AW50	United Kingdom	Standard long range and anti-materiel sniper rifle. Used by PASKAL as counter-sniper.
RC-50		Anti-materiel rifle	.50 BMG	RC-50F	United States	Standard long range and anti-materiel sniper rifle. Used by PASKAL as counter-sniper.
AW		Sniper rifle	.308 Winchester	AW	United Kingdom	Used by PASKAL.
DSR-1		Sniper rifle	.308 Winchester	DSR-1	Germany	Used by PASKAL.
M110 SASS		Sniper rifle	7.62×51mm NATO		United States	First seen in 2023 Merdeka Parade. Used by PASKAL.
HK417		Sharpshooter rifle	7.62×51mm NATO	HK417	Germany	Used by PASKAL.
MSG-90		Sharpshooter rifle	7.62×51mm NATO	MSG-90A1	Germany	Used by PASKAL.
M14		Sharpshooter rifle	7.62×51mm NATO	M14	United States	Limited service.
M40		Designated marksman rifle	7.62×51mm NATO	M40A5	United States	Used by PASKAL.
Beretta ARX 200		Designated marksman rifle	7.62×51mm NATO		Italy	First seen in Latgabma Malindo Darsasa 2023 Exercise.
Machine guns
Ameli		Light machine gun	5.56×45mm NATO	Ameli	Spain	Standard general purpose machine gun. Used by PASKAL.
MG4		Light machine gun	5.56×45mm NATO	MG4-KE	Germany	Standard squad automatic weapon, in service since 2010. Used by PASKAL.
Minimi		Light machine gun	5.56×45mm NATO	Minimi	Belgium	Belt-fed but can be used with STANAG magazines. Standard squad automatic weapon. Used by PASKAL.
SS-77		General purpose machine gun	7.62×51mm NATO	SS-77	South Africa	Standard general purpose machine gun. Mounted on PASKAL's Rigid Hull Inflatable Boat (RHIB).
MG5		General purpose machine gun	7.62×51mm NATO	MG5	Germany	Standard squad automatic weapon. Used by PASKAL.
MAG		General purpose machine gun	7.62×51mm NATO	MAG	Belgium	Standard general purpose machine gun. Used by all branches of the Royal Malaysian Navy. It can be attached to both navy assault vessels and tripods.
M2		Heavy machine gun	12.7×99mm NATO	M2HB GAU-21	United States	Mounted on vessels or tripods. Aircraft mounted machine gun, mounted on navy helicopters.
FN Herstal M3M		Heavy machine gun	12.7×99mm NATO		Belgium	Aircraft mounted machine gun, mounted on navy helicopters.
CANiK M2 QCB		Heavy machine gun	12.7×99mm NATO		Turkey	Mated with Sentinel RWS and installed on G2000 FIC 18M.
Remote controlled weapon stations
Sentinel RWS		Remote controlled weapon station	12.7×99mm NATO		Spain	Mounted on G2000 FIC 18M.
Grenade-based weapons
M203		Grenade launcher	40×46mm SR	M203 M203A1 M203A2 M203PI	United States	Single-shot underbarrel grenade launcher. Attached to M4/M4A1 (M203A1/A2), MP5A5 (M203PI) and M16A1 (M203).
M320		Grenade launcher	40×46mm SR	M320	Germany	Single-shot underbarrel grenade launcher. Attached to M4A1, HK416, G36 and XM8. Some in stand-alone system. Used by PASKAL.
AG36		Grenade launcher	40×46mm SR	AG36	Germany	Single-shot underbarrel grenade launcher. Attached to HK416, G36 and XM8. Some in stand-alone system. Used by PASKAL.
GMG		Automatic grenade launcher	40x53mm	GMG	Germany	Has a 320rpm rate of fire and an effective range of 1,500 m (4,900 ft)-2,000 m (6,600 ft). It is used for the suppression of enemy infantry and can be mounted on PASKAL assault boats and tripods.
Mk 3		HE grenade		Mk3A2	United States	
AN-M14		Incendiary grenade			United States	
Mk 141 Mod 0		Stun grenade			United States	
AN M18		Smoke grenade			United States	

== Attire ==
Attire	Pattern name(s)	Pattern	Image	Notes
Current attire
Digital Pattern				The Royal Malaysian Navy (Malay: Tentera Laut Diraja Malaysia, TLDM) introduces the new digital camo pattern during 59th Merdeka Day Parade on 31 August 2016. Digital pattern manufactured by Sritex (PT Sri Rejeki Isman Tbk).
Harimau Gurun Desert Pattern				It is a variant of Malay Tigerstripe Woodland pattern but with earth-brown stripes on a light green and sand-coloured background. Digital pattern manufactured by Sritex (PT Sri Rejeki Isman Tbk).
	Working Dress Uniform			

== Procurement ==
Following the completion of the New Generation Patrol Vessel (NGPV) program, RMN now moved to the next program called Second Generation Patrol Vessel (SGPV). RMN also planned to purchase a batch of Littoral Mission Ships (LMS) namely Keris-class littoral mission ship and Ada-class corvette. RMN also planned to add Multi Role Support Ship (MRSS) for its support role. Under recent modernisation plan, RMN desire to add more submarine in the fleet. Together with the modernisation plan, RMN launches an upgrade program called Service Life Extension Program (SLEP) for the old ships.

Modernisation program	Asset	Type	Origin	Quantity	Notes
Ships
Attack Submarine Program	Scorpène-class submarine	Attack submarine	France	2 more planned	Two Scorpène-class submarines were ordered by the RMN on 5 June 2002 under a €1.04 billion (about RM4.78 billion) contract. Under 15 to 5 program, RMN planned to add more submarine in the future. The class selected is Scorpène-class submarine.
Second Generation Patrol Vessel (SGPV) / Littoral Combat Ship (LCS) Program	Maharaja Lela-class frigate	Frigate / Littoral combat ship (LCS)	France; Malaysia	5 under construction	RMN has launched its program to procure new class of modern frigate. The program is called Second Generation Patrol Vessel (SGPV). In 2014, Malaysia signed a contract agreement worth MYR9 billion (US$2.8 billion) which awarded to Boustead Heavy Industries Corporation (BHIC) to build six frigates under the program. The ships will be built based on the Gowind 2500 corvette designed by French shipbuilder DCNS. A total of 12 ships planned under the 15 to 5 program. Additional order will be announced once the Maharaja Lela-class deliveries complete. In 2023 it is confirmed that only five ships will be completed while the sixth ship was cancelled.
Littoral Mission Ship (LMS) Program Batch 2	Tunku-class littoral mission ship	Corvette / Littoral mission ship (LMS)	Turkey	3 under construction	RMN has a needs to acquired a total of 18 units LMS by batch. Following the completion of four units for the first batch of the Keris-class littoral mission ship, RMN move to the next steps to acquired the next batch of LMS. RMN has ordered three Tunku-class littoral mission ship in June 2024. This leaving 11 more planned for the next batch.
Littoral Mission Ship (LMS) Program Batch 3		Corvette / Littoral mission ship (LMS)	Turkey Italy	3 planned	RMN has a needs to acquired a total of 18 units LMS by batch. Following the completion of four units for the first batch of the Keris-class littoral mission ship and three units for the second batch of the Tunku-class littoral mission ship, RMN move to the next steps to acquired the next batch of LMS. The shortlisted candidates are from Turkey and Italy.
Multi Role Support Ship (MRSS) Program	Mistral LHD Type 075 LHD Type 071 LPD Makassar LPD Damen Enforcer 10000 LPD TAIS LPD STM MRSS Mitsui MRSS Mitsubishi MRSS Hyundai HDL-13000 San Giorgio	Amphibious assault ship	France China Indonesia Netherlands Turkey Japan South Korea Italy	3 planned	RMN has launched their Multi-Role Support Ship (MRSS) program as part of the RMN's fleet modernisation program called 15 to 5. A total of three ships to be acquired in two batch where two ships will be purchase in the first batch and one ship in the second batch. The contenders includes Mistral LHD, Type 075 LHD, Type 071 LPD, Makassar LPD, Damen Enforcer 10000 LPD, Turkish made TAIS LPD, STM MRSS, Japanese made Mitsui MRSS, Mitsubishi MRSS and Hyundai HDL-13000. In July 2025, in conjunction of Prime Minister Anwar visits in Italy, Italian firm, Fincantieri officially offered improved San Giorgio for the MRSS requirement.
Multi Purpose Command Platform (MPCP) Program		Command platform ship	Turkey	1 approved	Command and control ship that hosted the boats, unmanned aerial vehicles and helicopters for the expeditionary role. Also provided command, control, communications, computers and intelligence (C4I) support to the navy in the assigned area. The shortlisted candidates are from Turkey.
Fast Interceptor Craft (FIC) Program	Gading Marine G2000 FIC 18M	Fast interceptor craft	Malaysia	12 in service, 7 under construction	The RMN have planned to acquire new Fast Interceptor Craft (FIC) for Ops Benteng during Pandemic COVID-19. The class selected is six G2000 FIC 18M from Malaysian company, Gading Marine. In 2021, Ministry of Defence said they will buy another 13 of this FIC to upgrade their defence for protection of Malaysia territorial waters. In LIMA 19, a model named MTC FIC 20 was presented by a local company named Marine Technology Company. This model will augment or replace the CB90 boats in RMN service between 2020 and 2025. 13 more ordered in 2022.
Diving Support Vessel (DSV) Program		Diving support vessel	Japan	1 under construction	Sponsored by Japan under Official Security Assistance (OSA).
Hydrographic Survey Vessel (HSV) Program		Hydrographic survey vessel		2 approved	
Helicopters
New Anti-Submarine Warfare (ASW) Helicopter Program	AgustaWestland AW159 Wildcat MH-60R Seahawk	Anti-submarine warfare helicopter	United Kingdom United States	6 planned	For anti-submarine helicopter, RMN planned to add with either AgustaWestland AW159 Wildcat or the Sikorsky MH-60R Seahawk. In 2016, an Italian-aerospace defence company, the Finmeccanica has signed a teaming agreement with Malaysian defence vehicle company, the Global Komited to jointly distribute AgustaWestland AW159 helicopters if it was selected by the Malaysian government. Navy chief Admiral Datuk Abdul Aziz Jaafar unveiled an intention of the navy to acquire at least six ASW helicopters as a complement to the soon to be commissioned Maharaja Lela-class frigate.

== See also ==
- List of equipment of the Malaysian Army
- List of equipment of the Royal Malaysian Air Force
- List of aircraft of the Malaysian Armed Forces
- List of equipment of the Malaysian Maritime Enforcement Agency
- List of vehicles of the Royal Malaysian Police
- List of police firearms in Malaysia
