= Keris-class littoral mission ship =

Malaysian patrol vessel class

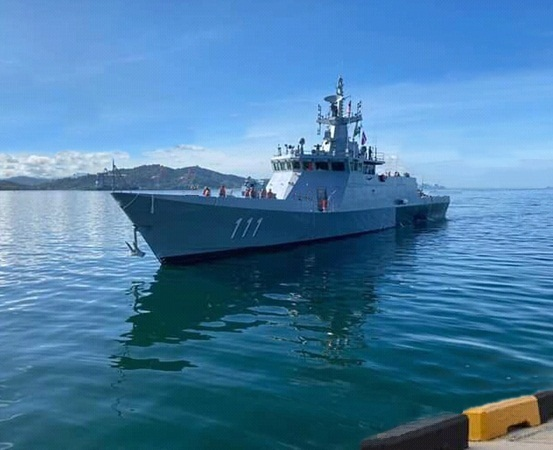
- KD Keris (111)

Class overview
- Name: Keris class
- Builders: China Shipbuilding and Offshore International Co. Ltd
- Operators: Royal Malaysian Navy
- Preceded by: Kedah class
- Planned: 18
- Completed: 4
- Active: 4

General characteristics
- Type: Littoral mission ship / Offshore patrol vessel
- Displacement: 700 tons
- Length: 69 m (226 ft 5 in)
- Beam: 9 m (29 ft 6 in)
- Draught: 2.8 m (9 ft 2 in)
- Speed: 24 knots (44 km/h; 28 mph)
- Range: 2,000 nmi (3,700 km; 2,300 mi) at 15 knots (28 km/h; 17 mph)
- Endurance: 15 days
- Boats & landing craft carried: 2 x RHIB
- Complement: 45 (8 officers 37 enlisted)
- Sensors & processing systems: SR-47AG search radar; HEOS-100 & HEOS-300 fire control radar
- Armament: 1 x 30 mm H/PJ-17; 2 x 12.7 mm Browning M2HB machine guns

The Keris class are a class of Littoral Mission Ship of the Royal Malaysian Navy (RMN). This ship is an offshore patrol vessel type with a length of 69 metres (226 ft 5 in) and displacing 700 tons. A total of 18 ships are planned. As of 2018, four ships have been funded by the Malaysian government.

== Development ==
The ships will be built by Malaysia and China companies under the joint development agreement. Malaysia and China agreed to jointly develop a Littoral Mission Ship and, two ships will be built in China by China Shipbuilding and Offshore International Co. Ltd, the rest will be built in Malaysia by local company Boustead Heavy Industries Corporation (BHIC). The first ship was to be delivered to the Royal Malaysian Navy by 2019, the second and third by 2020 and the fourth by 2021.

== Description ==
The ships are enlarged and improved version of the Durjoy-class large patrol craft of the Bangladesh Navy but armed with only guns as per requirement of the Royal Malaysian Navy. The ships able to carry up three standard ISO containers. The ships will support missions including anti-surface warfare, mine warfare, hydrography and intelligence, surveillance and reconnaissance (ISR) duties.

== Improved design ==
=== Revolutionary Littoral Mission Ship ===
BHIC revealed a newer design of the Littoral Mission Ship in Defence Service Asia 2018 named Revolutionary Littoral Mission Ship. The design will be more than 75 metres (246 ft) in length and will incorporate new capabilities to fulfill the Royal Malaysian Navy's requirements. It will have low radar cross section where BHIC has already improved their stealth design and the addition of a flight deck to accommodate a medium-sized helicopter. This new design will be offered by BHIC to the Royal Malaysian Navy for the next batch after all the four ships of the initial design were jointly constructed by Malaysia and China companies. A total of 18 ships of this class are planned to be ordered by the Royal Malaysian Navy.

== Program revised ==
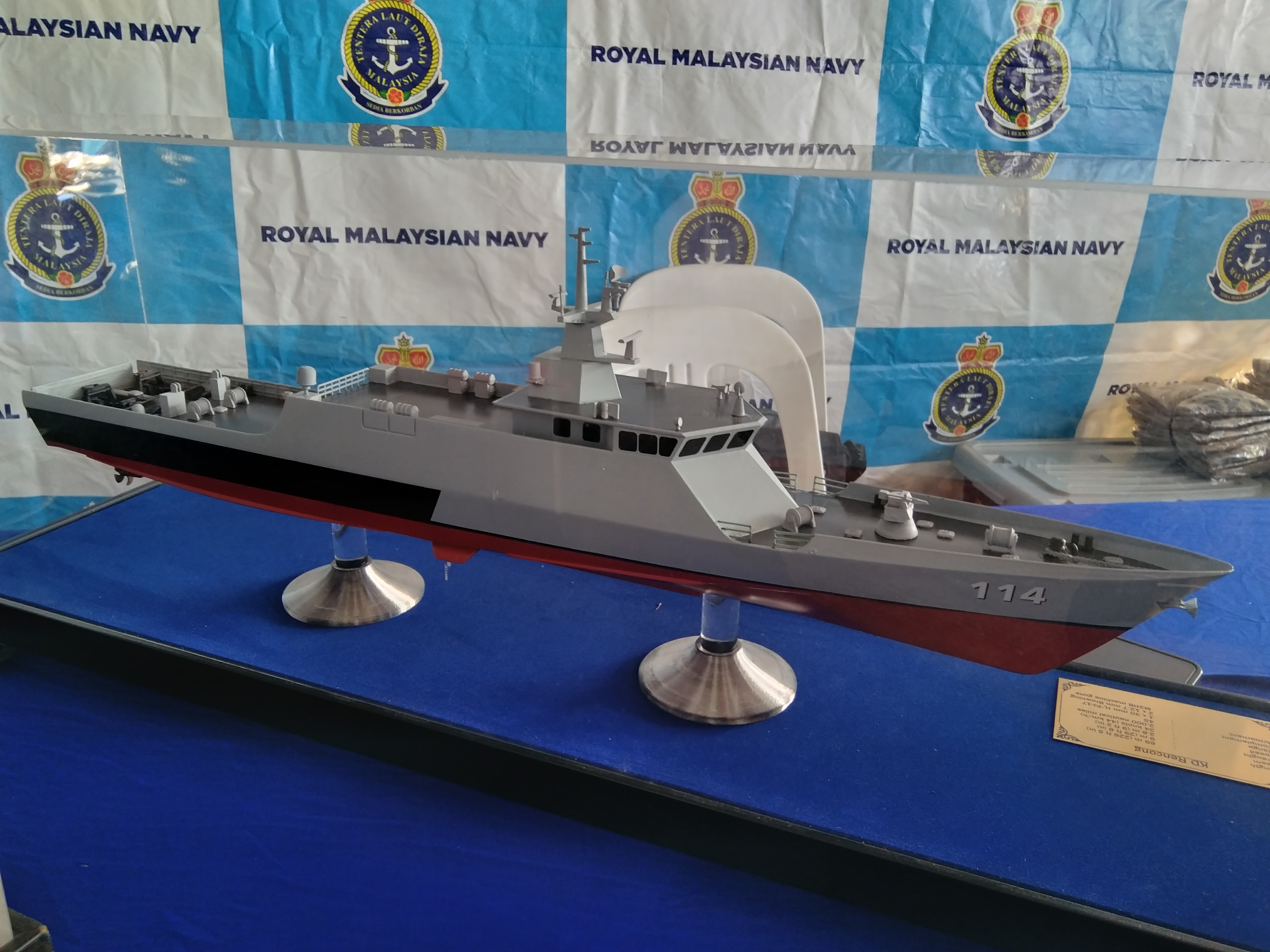
The model of Keris in display.

After the government changed in 2018 Malaysian general election, the Littoral Mission Ship acquisition program was revised in early 2019 to reduce the procurement costs and shorten the delivery process. Through this new contract all four ships will be built by China from the original contract, which was initially two vessels built by China and the rest built by Malaysia. In September 2020, Malaysia planned that the next batch of the ship will be the new design from other company. Its includes a 68 m offshore patrol vessel concept from Netherland shipbuilder Damen known as the Damen Stan Patrol Vessel 6811, a 70.7 m offshore patrol vessel from US shipbuilder Swiftships, a 70.2 m offshore patrol vessel from German shipbuilder Fassmer and a 70 m offshore patrol vessel from local company Preston. While the joint venture between Malaysian company, Destini, and Netherlands-based shipbuilder, Damen, offered the proposal that similar to the ship that ordered by Malaysia Coast Guard which is an 83 m Damen 1800 OPV.

== Ships ==
| Pennant no. | Name | Builder | Laid down | Launched | Commissioned | Division/Squadron | Homeport | Status |
|---|---|---|---|---|---|---|---|---|
| 111 | KD Keris | China Shipbuilding & Offshore International Company | 23 October 2018 | 15 April 2019 | 6 January 2020 | 11th LMS Squadron | Sepanggar | In service |
| 112 | KD Sundang | China Shipbuilding & Offshore International Company | 23 October 2018 | 12 July 2019 | 5 March 2021 | 11th LMS Squadron | Sepanggar | In service |
| 113 | KD Badik | China Shipbuilding & Offshore International Company | 18 September 2019 | 30 October 2020 | 22 October 2021 | 11th LMS Squadron | Sepanggar | In service |
| 114 | KD Rencong | China Shipbuilding & Offshore International Company | 18 September 2019 | 16 December 2020 | 28 January 2022 | 11th LMS Squadron | Sepanggar | In service |

== See also ==
- Durjoy-class patrol craft – A Bangladesh Navy ship class based on the same design.
- List of naval ship classes in service
