= KD Sundang =

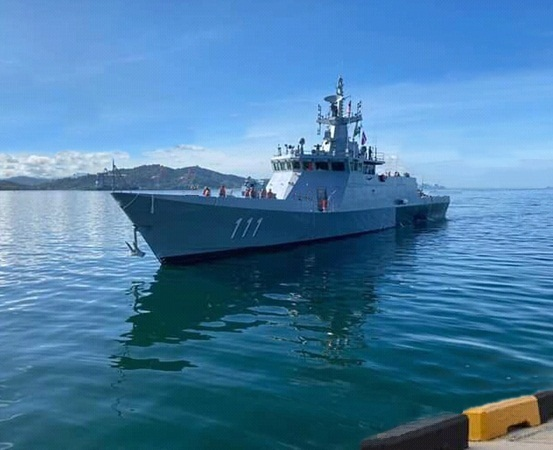
- Sister ship KD Keris

History

Malaysia
- Name: KD Sundang
- Builder: China Shipbuilding and Offshore International Co. Ltd
- Launched: 12 July 2019
- Commissioned: 5 March 2021
- Home port: Sepanggar, Sabah
- Status: In active service
- Badge

General characteristics
- Class & type: Keris-class littoral mission ship
- Displacement: 700 long tons (711 t) full load
- Length: 69 m (226 ft 5 in)
- Beam: 9 m (29 ft 6 in)
- Draught: 2.8 m (9 ft 2 in)
- Speed: 24 knots (44 km/h)
- Range: 2,000 nautical miles (3,700 km) at 15 knots (28 km/h)
- Complement: 45
- Sensors & processing systems: SR-47AG search radar; HEOS-100 & HEOS-300 fire control radar
- Armament: 1 x 30 mm H/PJ-17; 2 x 12.7 mm Browning M2HB machine guns

KD Sundang is the second ship of Keris-class littoral mission ship of the Royal Malaysian Navy. She was built by China Shipbuilding and Offshore International Co. Ltd, based on an enlarged and improved version of Durjoy-class large patrol craft of the Bangladesh Navy. Currently, she is in service with the 11th LMS Squadron based in Sepanggar, Sabah.

== Development ==
Sundang was launched on 12 July 2019 in China and commissioned on 5 March 2021 in Malaysia. The ceremony was completed by the Commander of the Navy (Admiral Tan Sri Mohd Reza Mohd Sany), by reading the letter of commission and wearing the Commanding Insignia to the Commander Khairil Sarian, which is the first Commanding Officer of the Sundang.
