= Glover Webb Hornet =

- Malaysian Army Glover Webb Hornet
- Type: Light assault vehicle
- Place of origin: United Kingdom

Production history
- Manufacturer: Glover Webb Limited

Specifications
- Mass: 3.6 tonnes
- Length: 4.4 meters
- Width: 1.7 meters
- Height: 2.2 meters
- Crew: 3
- Main armament: 12.7 mm machine gun
- Secondary armament: 7.62 mm machine gun
- Suspension: 4x4
- Maximum speed: 120 km/h

The Glover Webb Hornet is a light assault vehicle based on the Land Rover Defender 4x4 vehicle. It was built by the United Kingdom-based company Glover Webb Limited.

== Design ==
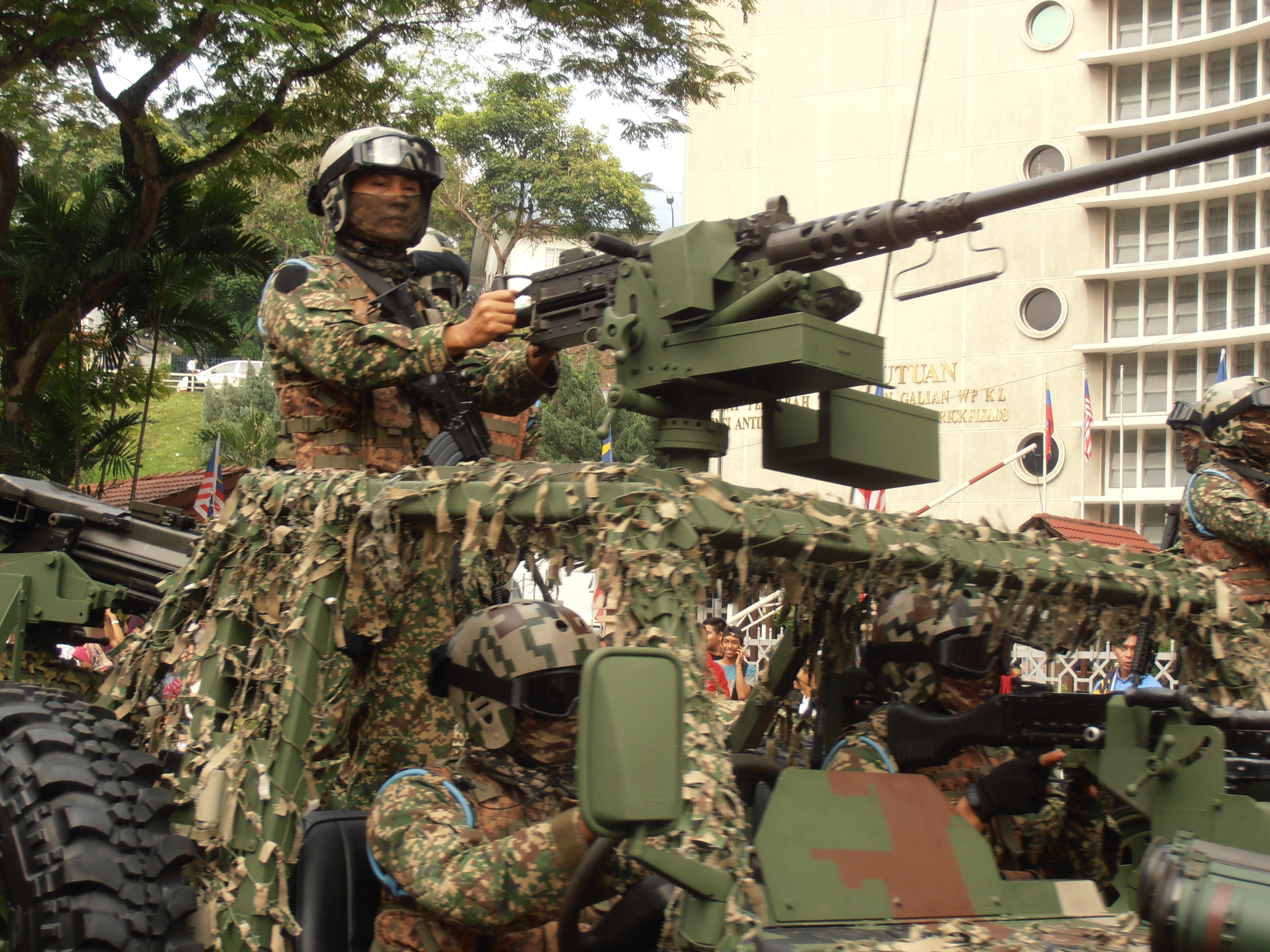
GGK with Glover Webb Hornet light assault vehicle.

The vehicle specifications are the same as the Land Rover Defender where the engine is in the front and the driver and commander are in the middle. Its powered by V8 petrol engine or a turbocharged diesel engine. For the armament, Glover Webb Hornet armed with one 12.7 mm machine gun on the top of the roof and one 7.62 mm machine gun at the commander seat. Both machine guns are manually operates by one soldier each. This vehicle also equipped with smoke grenade dischargers as self defence protection.
