= KD Keris =

Malaysian naval vessel

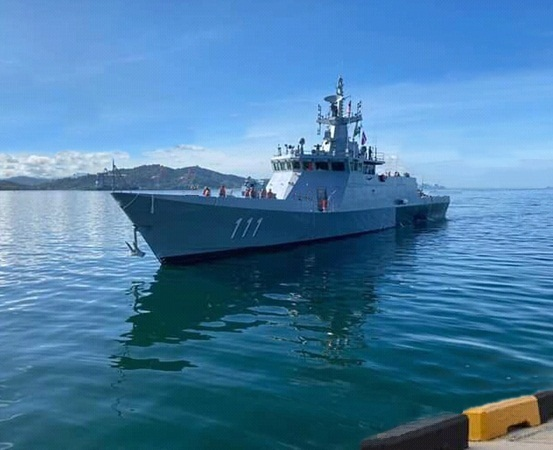
- KD Keris (111)

History

Malaysia
- Name: KD Keris
- Builder: China Shipbuilding and Offshore International Co. Ltd
- Launched: 15 April 2019
- Commissioned: 6 January 2020
- Home port: Sepanggar, Sabah
- Status: In active service
- Badge

General characteristics
- Class & type: Keris-class littoral mission ship
- Displacement: 700 long tons (711 t) full load
- Length: 69 m (226 ft 5 in)
- Beam: 9 m (29 ft 6 in)
- Draught: 2.8 m (9 ft 2 in)
- Speed: 24 knots (44 km/h)
- Range: 2,000 nautical miles (3,700 km) at 15 knots (28 km/h)
- Complement: 45
- Sensors & processing systems: SR-47AG search radar; HEOS-100 & HEOS-300 fire control radar
- Armament: 1 x 30 mm H/PJ-17; 2 x 12.7 mm Browning M2HB machine guns

KD Keris is the lead ship of Keris-class littoral mission ship of the Royal Malaysian Navy. She was built by the Chinese company China Shipbuilding and Offshore International Co. Ltd and was one of the first major Chinese-made equipment purchased by the navy.

== Development ==
Keris was first built on 31 July 2018 at Wucang Port, Wuhan and was launched by then wife of the Minister of Defense, Normah Alwi on 15 April 2019. Keris physical handover ceremony to the Government of Malaysia was completed by the Final Acceptance Committee led by the Secretary of the Procurement Division, Ministry of Defense, Datuk Ahmad Husaini Abdul Rahman, on 31 December 2019. She then commissioned on 6 January 2020 at China Shipbuilding and Offshore International Co. Ltd facility in Wucang Port, Qidong, Shanghai, China.
