= KD Rencong =

Keris-class littoral mission ship

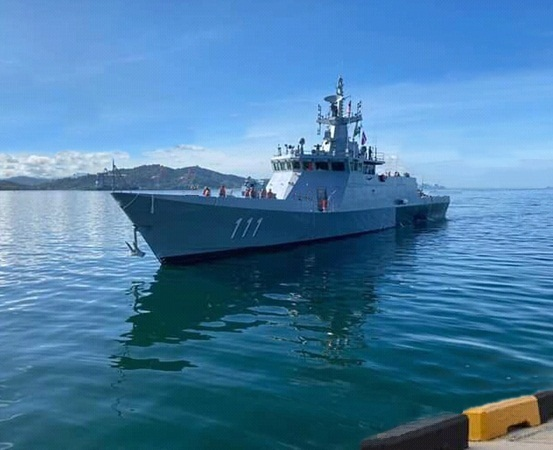
- Sister ship KD Keris

History

Malaysia
- Name: KD Rencong
- Builder: China Shipbuilding and Offshore International Co. Ltd
- Launched: 16 December 2020
- Commissioned: 28 January 2022
- Home port: Sepanggar, Sabah
- Status: In active service
- Badge

General characteristics
- Class & type: Keris-class littoral mission ship
- Displacement: 700 long tons (711 t) full load
- Length: 69 m (226 ft 5 in)
- Beam: 9 m (29 ft 6 in)
- Draught: 2.8 m (9 ft 2 in)
- Speed: 24 knots (44 km/h)
- Range: 2,000 nautical miles (3,700 km) at 15 knots (28 km/h)
- Complement: 45
- Sensors & processing systems: SR-47AG search radar; HEOS-100 & HEOS-300 fire control radar
- Armament: 1 x 30 mm H/PJ-17; 2 x 12.7 mm Browning M2HB machine guns

KD Rencong is the fourth ship of Keris-class littoral mission ship. She was built for the Royal Malaysian Navy by China Shipbuilding and Offshore International Co. Ltd at Wucang Port, Qidong, Shanghai, in China. Rencong delivered in 2021 and commissioned in 2022 and will be in service with the 11th LMS Squadron based in Sepanggar, Sabah.
