= KD Badik =

Malaysian naval vessel

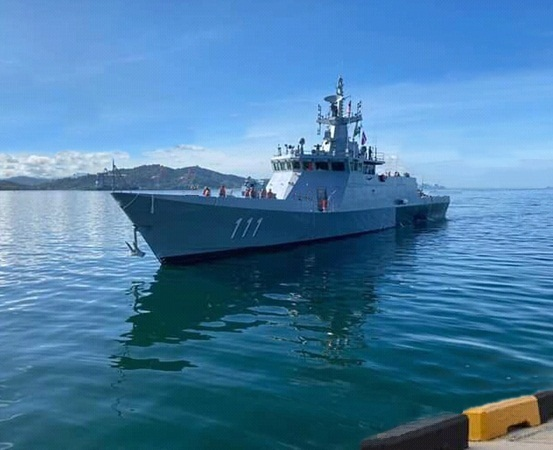
- Sister ship KD Keris

History

Malaysia
- Name: KD Badik
- Builder: China Shipbuilding and Offshore International Co. Ltd
- Launched: 15 April 2019
- Commissioned: 22 October 2021
- Home port: Sepanggar, Sabah
- Status: In active service
- Badge

General characteristics
- Class & type: Keris-class littoral mission ship
- Displacement: 700 long tons (711 t) full load
- Length: 69 m (226 ft 5 in)
- Beam: 9 m (29 ft 6 in)
- Draught: 2.8 m (9 ft 2 in)
- Speed: 24 knots (44 km/h)
- Range: 2,000 nautical miles (3,700 km) at 15 knots (28 km/h)
- Complement: 45
- Sensors & processing systems: SR-47AG search radar; HEOS-100 & HEOS-300 fire control radar
- Armament: 1 x 30 mm H/PJ-17; 2 x 12.7 mm Browning M2HB machine guns

KD Badik is the third ship of Keris-class littoral mission ship of the Royal Malaysian Navy. She was built at Wucang Port, Qidong, Shanghai, in China by China Shipbuilding and Offshore International Co. Ltd. Badik was commissioned on 22 October 2021 and in service with the 11th LMS Squadron based in Sepanggar, Sabah.

== Development ==
Badik was launched on 15 April 2019 in China and its Physical Hand Over (PHO) ceremony was held at the Wuchang Shipyard in Qidong, China on 14 September 2021. She was commissioned on 22 October 2021.
