= MV Mega Bakti =

Submarine rescue ship

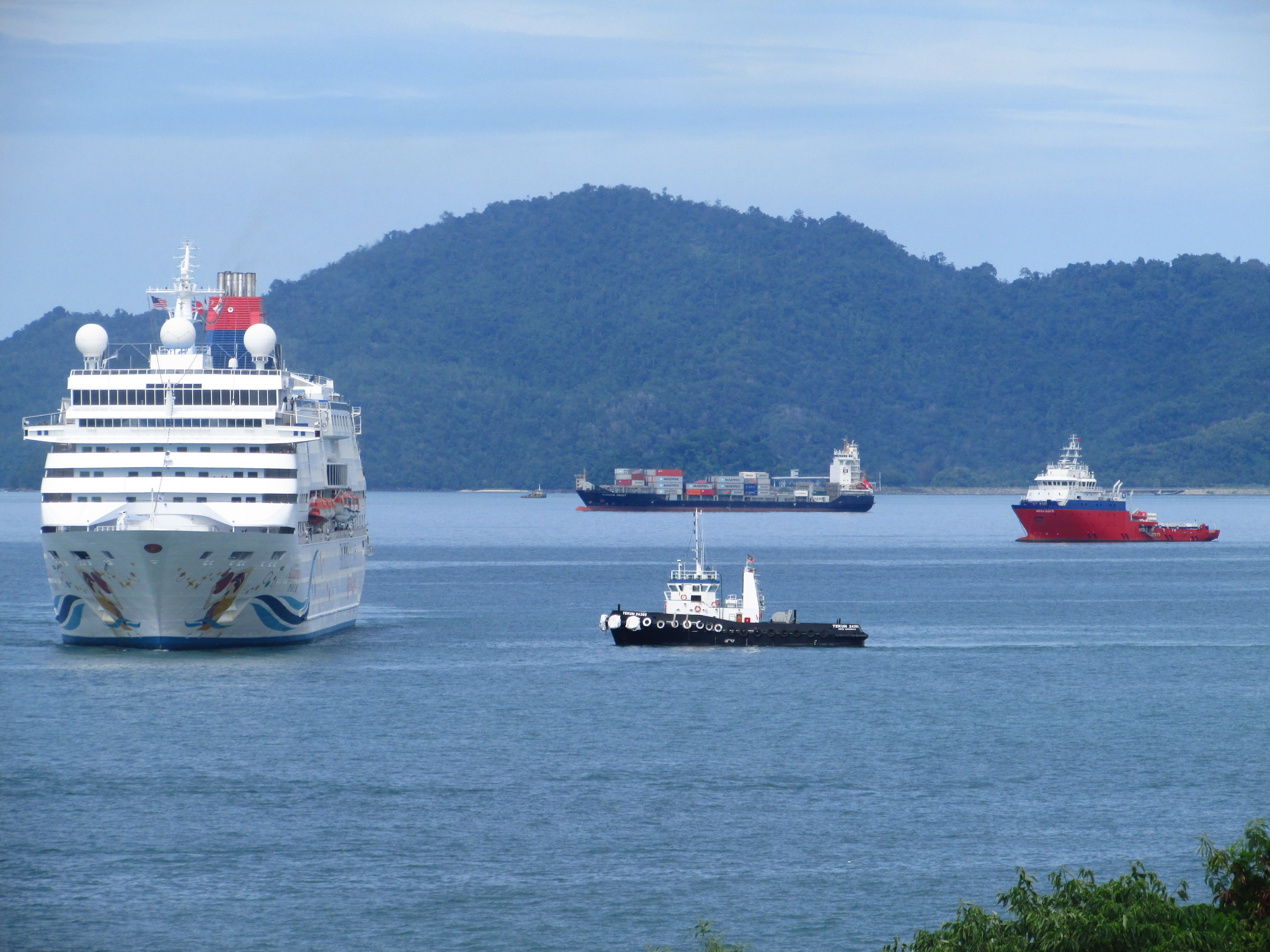
- MV Mega Bakti (far right) anchored in Gaya Bay in 2014

History

Malaysia
- Name: MV Mega Bakti
- Operator: Royal Malaysian Navy
- Builder: Keppel Singmarine
- Home port: Sepanggar, Kota Kinabalu, Sabah
- Identification: IMO number: 9612571; MMSI number: 533130895; Callsign: 9MPU8
- Status: Active

General characteristics
- Type: Submarine rescue ship
- Displacement: 1960 tonnes
- Length: 80 m (260 ft)
- Beam: 17 m (56 ft)
- Draught: 1.1 m (3.6 ft)
- Speed: 15.0 knots (27.8 km/h; 17.3 mph)
- Complement: 95

MV Mega Bakti is a submarine rescue ship operated by the Royal Malaysian Navy (RMN). The ship was specially designed and built by Keppel Singmarine for use in Malaysia.

== Development ==
Keppel Singmarine signed a contract with the RMN on 12 July 2012. The RMN officially received Mega Bakti on 24 September 2013 and placed her under the RMN Submarine Headquarters (MAKS) based on Sepanggar in Sabah. The ship is designed to be surface support vessel for submarine rescue and offers its services in two forms. The head of operations (SMER-I) is charged with demonstrations and training; other operations include training ship divers, search and rescue (SAR), torpedo recovery.

== Characteristics ==
The ship is fitted with a double lock decompression chamber (DDC) and global positioning system intelligent buoy tracking system (GIB), and a remotely-operated vehicle (ROV). The ROV is controlled remotely by operators via a cable connected to the Mega Bakti. During a rescue operation, the ROV is used to install the distressed submarine ventilation and depressurization system (DSVSD) at a depth of up to 400 meters. It is capable of cleaning the obstacles at the escape hatch of a submarine-in-distress (DISSUB), capturing photos and videos and sending emergency life support stores (ELSS) pods. The ELSS Pod is used as a medical aid, food and other necessities to DISSUB using the ROV. Mega Bakti provided 12 ELSS pods capable of accommodating pressures of 65 bar. The GPS intelligent buoy is used to detect DISSUB positions stranded at sea and can detect up to 1,000 meters.

The distressed submarine ventilation and depressurization system (DSVSD) is installed on DISSUB to discharge clean air and drain out contaminated air from DISSUB. This system has been used by the French Navy and can reach depths of 250 meters. The double lock decompression chamber (DDC) is used to treat submarine crews with decompression sickness (DCI). Mega Bakti has 2 DDC units that can treat 6 patients in each DDC unit.

The portable underwater telephone system is also used to carry out communication between Mega Bakti and a DISSUB.

Mega Bakti has two fast rescue boats to perform submarine crew rescue operations at any time and is an intermediary element of communication between parent aircraft and DISSUB.

== Missions ==
In 2014, Mega Bakti was deployed to search the missing Malaysia Airlines aircraft, MH370 that was missing in the Indian Ocean. This mission is the first her deployment.

In 2021, Mega Bakti is en-route again to search for the missing Indonesian Navy submarine after KRI Nanggala, went missing off the waters of Bali during a torpedo drill, and reached the scene on the 25th of April 2021.
