= Sri Tiga-class fast troop vessel =

Vessel class

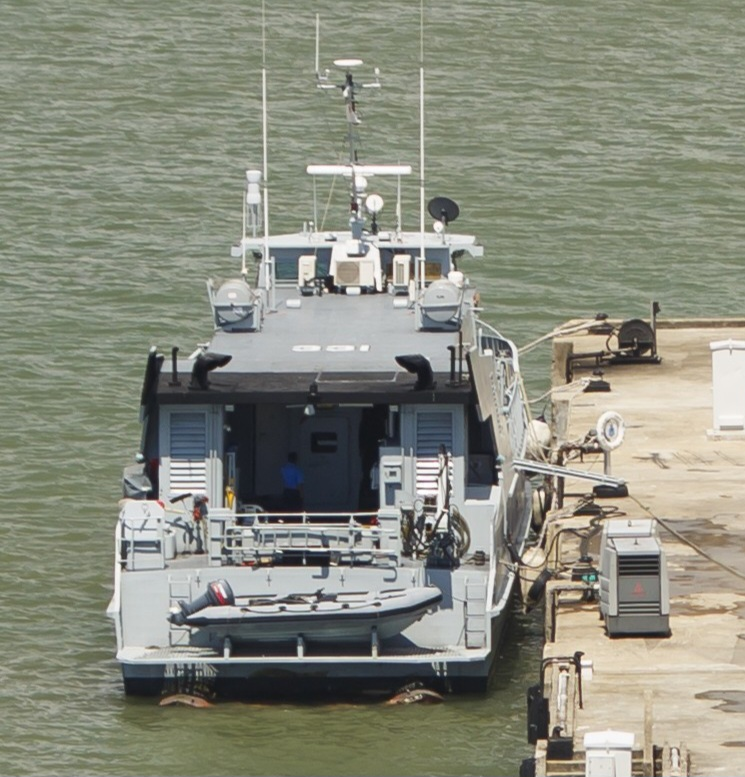
- Rear view of KD Sri Gaya

Class overview
- Name: Sri Tiga class
- Builders: Boustead Heavy Industries Corporation (BHIC)
- Operators: Royal Malaysian Navy
- Completed: 2
- Active: 2

General characteristics
- Type: Fast Troop Vessels
- Displacement: 117 tonnes
- Length: 38 m (125 ft)
- Beam: 7 m (23 ft)
- Draught: 1.1 m (3.6 ft)
- Propulsion: 4 MAN D2842 LE 408 diesel, 4 water-jets Hamilton 521
- Speed: 28.0 knots (51.9 km/h; 32.2 mph)
- Sensors & processing systems: Search and navigation radar Furuno, I-band
- Armament: 1 x 20 mm gun; 2 x 12.7 mm Browning M2HB machine gun

The Sri Tiga class is a class of fast troop vessels of the Royal Malaysian Navy (RMN) with the length of 38 meters and displacing 117 tons. A total of two ships are currently in service.

== Development ==
The Royal Malaysian Navy (RMN) commissioned their two locally built KD Sri Gaya and KD Sri Tiga in 2001. Both ships build by local company Boustead Heavy Industries Corporation (BHIC). All ships named after islands in Sabah.

== Characteristics ==
This ship is made of aluminum, lighter material than steel plate but more secure than fiberglass and needs only minimal maintenance. The crew of this ship is small, leaving more space for carrying troops.

The ship is powered by four waterjets and four machines, able to reach a speed of 25-28 knots. This is high for this size of military troop transport ship. The ship weighs 117 tons and is 38 meters long and 7.2 meters wide. It can carry 32 fully armed troops and equipment at a cruising speed over 1000 km of 14 knots.

For self-defense, this ship is equipped with 20mm cannon. Other weaponry such as grenade launcher and anti-tank guided missile can be added. This ship's modular design allows it to serve multiple purposes, including fast attack, fast troop vessel, light logistic vessel, general cargo, marine ambulance, diving platforms, and patrol.

== Major operation ==
In May 2018, the KD Sri Tiga held a meeting with the Philippine Navy ship, the BRP Cebu at the maritime border between Malaysia and the Philippines to exchange intelligence information as part of the Trilateral Maritime Patrol Programme in the Eastern Security Zone (Esszone) of Sabah.

== Ships of the class ==
Pennant number	Name	Commission Year
332	KD Sri Tiga	2001
331	KD Sri Gaya	2001
