= Heckler & Koch P9 =

- HK P9S with magazine
- Type: Semi-automatic pistol
- Place of origin: West Germany

Service history
- In service: 1969-present
- Used by: See Users
- Wars: Lebanese Civil War

Production history
- Designer: Herbert Meidel
- Designed: 1965-1969
- Manufacturer: Heckler & Koch
- Produced: c.1969-1978(P9) 1970-1995(P9S)
- No. built: SAO: 485; P9S: unknown
- Variants: P9S, P9 SAO

Specifications
- Mass: 880 g (31 oz), empty (.45 ACP)
- Length: 19.2 cm (7.5 in)
- Barrel length: 10.2 cm (4 in)
- Height: 13.7 cm (5.4 in)
- Cartridge: 9×19mm Parabellum.45 ACP; 7.65×21mm Parabellum
- Action: Roller delayed, Traditional Double Action
- Rate of fire: Semi-automatic
- Feed system: 9-round (9×19mm) or 7-round (.45 ACP) single column, detachable box magazine

The HK P9 is a semi-automatic pistol from Heckler & Koch in 9×19mm Parabellum, .45 ACP, and 7.65×21mm Parabellum and the first to use a variation of H&K's roller delayed blowback system in a pistol format and polygonal rifling now common in H&K designs.

== Design ==
The P9 is a roller-delayed pistol manufactured from a stamped steel main frame and a polymer trigger guard. The stamped steel slide contains machined internal parts including a polygonally rifled barrel. High-profile fixed sights are fitted with two red rectangles on the rear sight and a white stripe on the drift adjustable front blade sight. Vertical zeroing is accomplished by fitting front sights of a different height.

The P9S trigger operates as a traditional double action. There is a lever on the left side of the pistol grip to both decock a cocked hammer or to manually re-cock it for a single action first shot, a feature first observed on the Sauer 38H. A further function of the decocking lever is to release the slide stop. The hammer is concealed within the slide (also similar to the Sauer) with a protruding pin at the rear of the slide as a cocking indicator. The operating spring surrounds the barrel, allowing for a lower bore axis than pistols such as John Browning's M1911 that have the operating spring below the barrel. A manual firing-pin safety is located at the left rear of the slide; putting it in the down position locks the firing pin and flipping it up to level position unlocks it.

Typical to European pistols, the magazine release is heel-mounted. The magazine is single column.

== Production and variants ==
The design-work began around 1965, with the first series (known as "pre-73" or just P9 without S) being produced between 1969 and 1973. 485 single-action P9s were produced before being discontinued.

A traditional double action version, the P9S (the S standing for Spannabzug, or "double-action trigger") was manufactured in greater numbers, from 1973 all the way up to 1978, until being discontinued again. .45 ACP variant was introduced in 1977.

The P9S was adopted by the US Navy for use with a sound suppressor. The suppressors of the period were comparatively large and the model frequently used with the P9S makes the pistol's sights unusable, so the suppressor was equipped with sights instead. The fixed barrel of the P9S allows the pistol to operate reliably with the suppressor attached without requiring the recoil booster most recoil-operated pistols need to accommodate the extra mass a suppressor adds to the weapon's muzzle.

A shortened version, the P9K (the K standing for Kurz, or "short") was made in prototype form. Until Theodor Koch's death in October 1976, four prototypes of a shortened version of the P9K were also produced, but was never put into production.

In addition to the standard P9S, a P9S Target model was also offered. This model included a taller front sight, a windage and elevation adjustable rear sight, an adjustable trigger over-travel stop, and an adjustable trigger that could be adjusted down to as low as approximately a 2.5# pull. The P9S Target model was offered in both 9mm as well as .45 ACP.

== Users ==
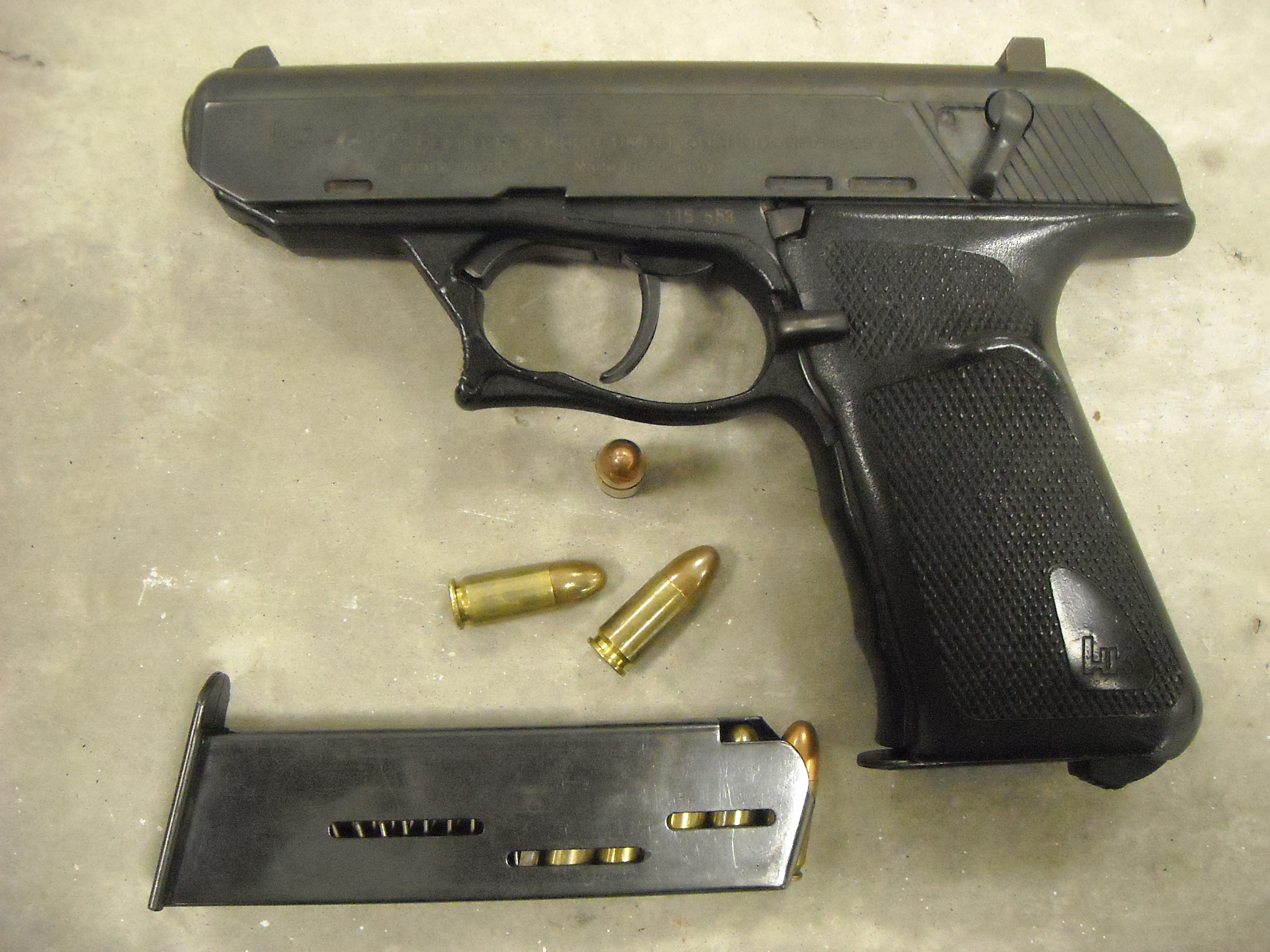

- Algeria: Algerian police
- West Germany: GSG9, Saarland Police
- Greece: EP9S variant.
- Japan: Used formerly by the Special Armed Police
- Malaysia:Malaysian Armed Forces and Royal Malaysia Police.
- Netherlands: Brigade Speciale Beveiligingsopdrachten.
- Pakistan: Special Service Group.
- Paraguay
- Saudi Arabia
- South Korea: National Intelligence Service (South Korea)
- Sudan
- United States: U.S. Navy.

== See also ==
- List of individual weapons of the U.S. Armed Forces
