= Canik Arms =

Turkish small arms and defense systems manufacturer

CANiK
- Company type: Subsidiary
- Industry: Defence, Firearms, Weapon Systems
- Founded: 1998
- Headquarters: Istanbul, Turkey
- Area served: Worldwide
- Products: Pistols, heavy machine guns, remote weapon stations, defense systems
- Parent: Samsun Yurt Savunma (SYS)
- Website: www.canik.com

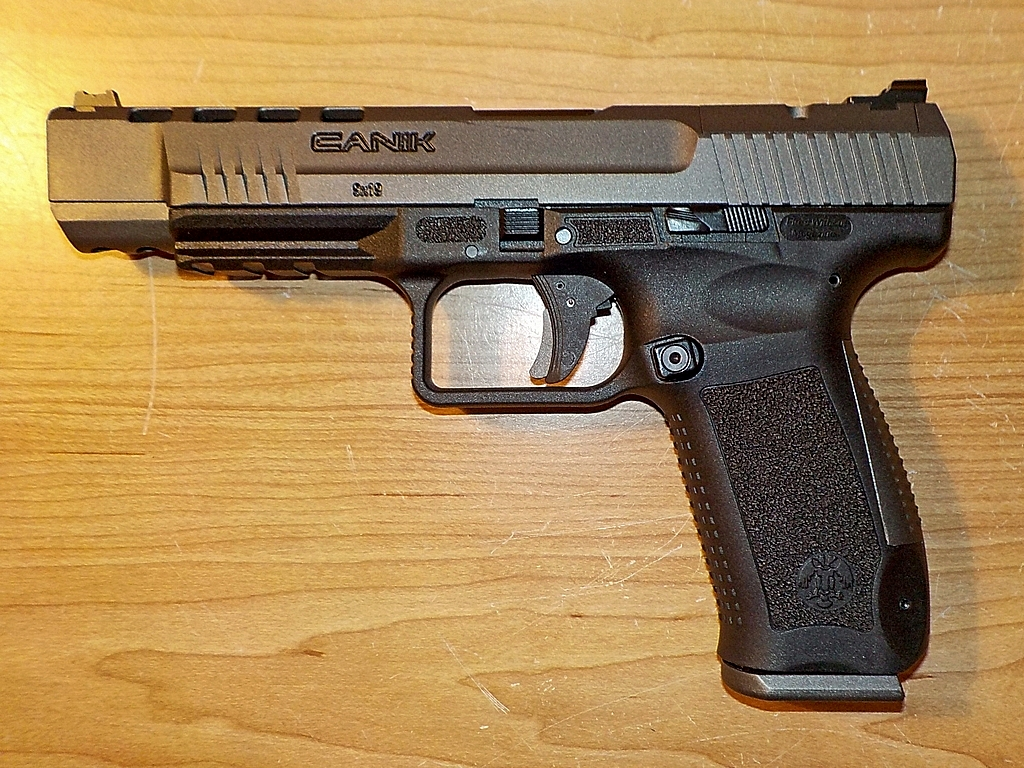
CANiK TP9 SFx 9×19mm pistol

CANiK is a Turkish firearms and defense systems manufacturer operating under Samsun Yurt Savunma (SYS). Established in 1998, the company is best known for its striker-fired pistol platforms, particularly the TP9 series, which has been widely exported to military, law enforcement, and civilian markets worldwide.

The company’s main production facilities are located in Samsun, Turkey, while its headquarters is in Istanbul. CANiK exports its products to more than 60 countries across Europe, Asia, Africa, and the Americas.

As of the early 2020s, CANiK and its parent company SYS have been cited among the leading global small arms manufacturers by production volume and export reach.

== History ==
CANiK was established in 1998 as part of Turkey’s expanding private defense manufacturing sector. The company initially focused on handgun production, later expanding into polymer-framed striker-fired pistols and competitive shooting platforms.

In the 2010s, CANiK became internationally recognized through its TP9 series pistols, which gained adoption by multiple law enforcement agencies and security forces.

Following its integration into SYS ecosystem, CANiK expanded into heavier weapon systems and modular defense technologies.

== Products ==
=== Pistols ===
CANiK is widely known for its TP9 and METE series pistols:

- TP9 series (various striker-fired models)
  - TP9 SF
  - TP9 SFx
  - TP9 Elite Combat
  - TP9 Sub-Compact variants
- METE series (modernized TP9 platform)
  - METE SF
  - METE SFx
  - METE MC9
  - METE MC9 Prime
- SFx Rival series
  - SFx Rival
  - SFx Rival-S

=== Heavy Weapon Systems ===
Under SYS integration, CANiK has expanded into heavier systems:

- CANiK M2/M3 family heavy machine gun and remote weapon station solutions
- CANiK M3 FALCON remote weapon system (RWS), designed for armored and aerial platform integration

The M3 FALCON system has been publicly showcased for potential integration with platforms such as the TAI T625 Gökbey and TEI T-70 helicopters and other rotary-wing aircraft, though operational deployment details remain limited in open sources.

== International Use and Exports ==
CANiK firearms are used by military, law enforcement, and civilian users in more than 60 countries. The company has increased export activity particularly in Asia and the Middle East, with reported contracts including Azerbaijan and Pakistan in recent defense procurement cycles.

== SYS Defense Ecosystem ==
CANiK operates under SYS, which also includes other defense subsidiaries involved in:

- Small arms systems
- Remote weapon stations
- Ammunition and weapon integration solutions
- Advanced electro-mechanical weapon systems

SYS has expanded through acquisitions and partnerships in Europe, strengthening its position in NATO-compatible defense markets.

== See also ==
- Samsun Yurt Savunma
- Defence industry of Turkey
- Small arms
