= Robar RC-50 =

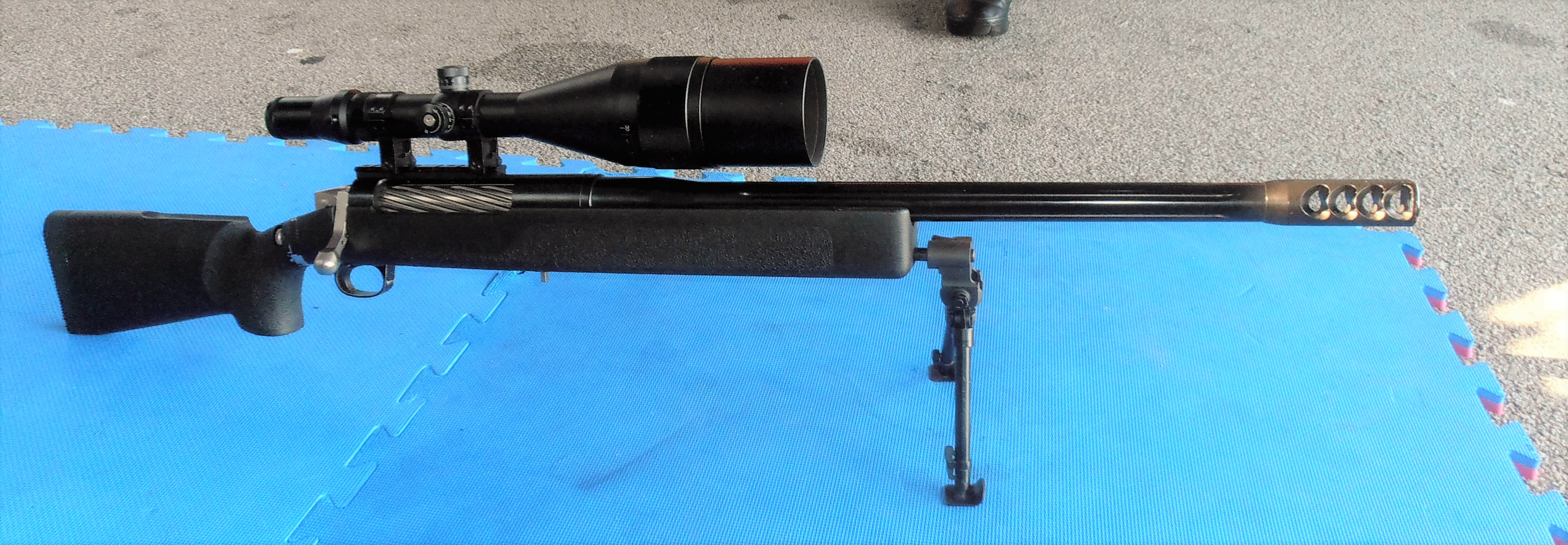
- Robar RC-50 on display
- Type: Anti-materiel rifle
- Place of origin: United States

Production history
- Designed: 1985
- Manufacturer: Robar Companies, Inc
- Variants: RC-50F

Specifications
- Mass: 25 lb (11 kg)
- Length: 35.98 in (91.4 cm)
- Barrel length: 28.94 in (73.5 cm)
- Cartridge: .50 BMG
- Action: bolt action
- Muzzle velocity: 853 m/s (2,799 ft/s)
- Feed system: 5-round detachable box magazine
- Sights: Customizable; 16x telescopic sight

The Robar RC-50 is a bolt-action anti-materiel rifle chambered in .50 BMG (12.7×99 mm NATO) manufactured by Robar Companies, Inc. The RC-50 is found in two variants—the original RC-50 (RC-50 Standard) and the side-folding buttstock RC-50F.

== Description ==
The RC-50 is based on it with the factory's SR-60D development, it is specifically for the special forces set up manual sniper rifle. Like many anti-materiél rifles, the RC-50 can be used to perform anti-sniper missions, destroy enemy light vehicles, radar, aircraft, and annihilate enemy personnel. The sniper rifle is available in two versions, the standard and RC-50F with foldable buttstock, which is folded left and made of fiberglass. In order to reduce the recoil, the RC-50 is equipped with a muzzle brake, with a cushioning stock. It is equipped with a bipod. The rifle's detachable magazines have a capacity of five rounds of .50 BMG. The RC-50's bolt is similar to the Remington 700 long action, but scaled up to use the larger cartridge. Users can also choose their own preferences to rifle color or coating, the current optional black, gray and camouflage. The RC-50 and its special accessories are housed in a fiberglass case for easy carrying. The dedicated sight is a 16x optical sight, mounted through a bracket at the top of the rifle casing, and taking into account the different operational needs, this gun can also use other sights.

== See also ==
- Barrett M95
