= Sandakan Jaya Teknik MPB =

Class overview
- Name: Sandakan Jaya Teknik MPB
- Builders: Sandakan Jaya Teknik
- Operators: Royal Malaysian Navy

General characteristics
- Length: 14 m (46 ft)
- Beam: 3 m (9 ft 10 in)
- Height: 1.6 m (5 ft 3 in)
- Propulsion: Main engine: 3 × Yamaha engines
- Speed: 48 knots (89 km/h)
- Sensors & processing systems: Multi-function radar Navigation radar Automatic identification system Global positioning system
- Armament: 2 × 7.62 mm machine guns

Sandakan Jaya Teknik Multi Purpose Boat or Sandakan Jaya Teknik MPB is the multipurpose combat boat in service with the Royal Malaysian Navy (RMN). The boat manufactured by Malaysian company named Sandakan Jaya Teknik Sdn Bhd located in Sabah.

== Development ==
Not much details published about the boat although some of the general specification can be obtained from the tender issued by the Malaysian Government previously.

The boat has a length of 14 meter, beam of 3 meter and height of 1.6 meter. The boat powered by three Yamaha engines with the top speed of 48 knots. The boat also equipped with radar and global positioning system.

Currently, a total of four boats in service with RMN for Eastern Fleet Command in Sabah with more planned to be order in the future. The boat and other maritime assets are involves in Ops Benteng to secure the security of Sabah's littoral water from intrusion of illegal immigrants and pirates. Other than that, the boat's role also includes the supply of logistic for RMN's nearest base as well as offshore base and sea basing base.

== Operators ==
Malaysia

- Royal Malaysian Navy
