= Pengawal 14m-class boat =

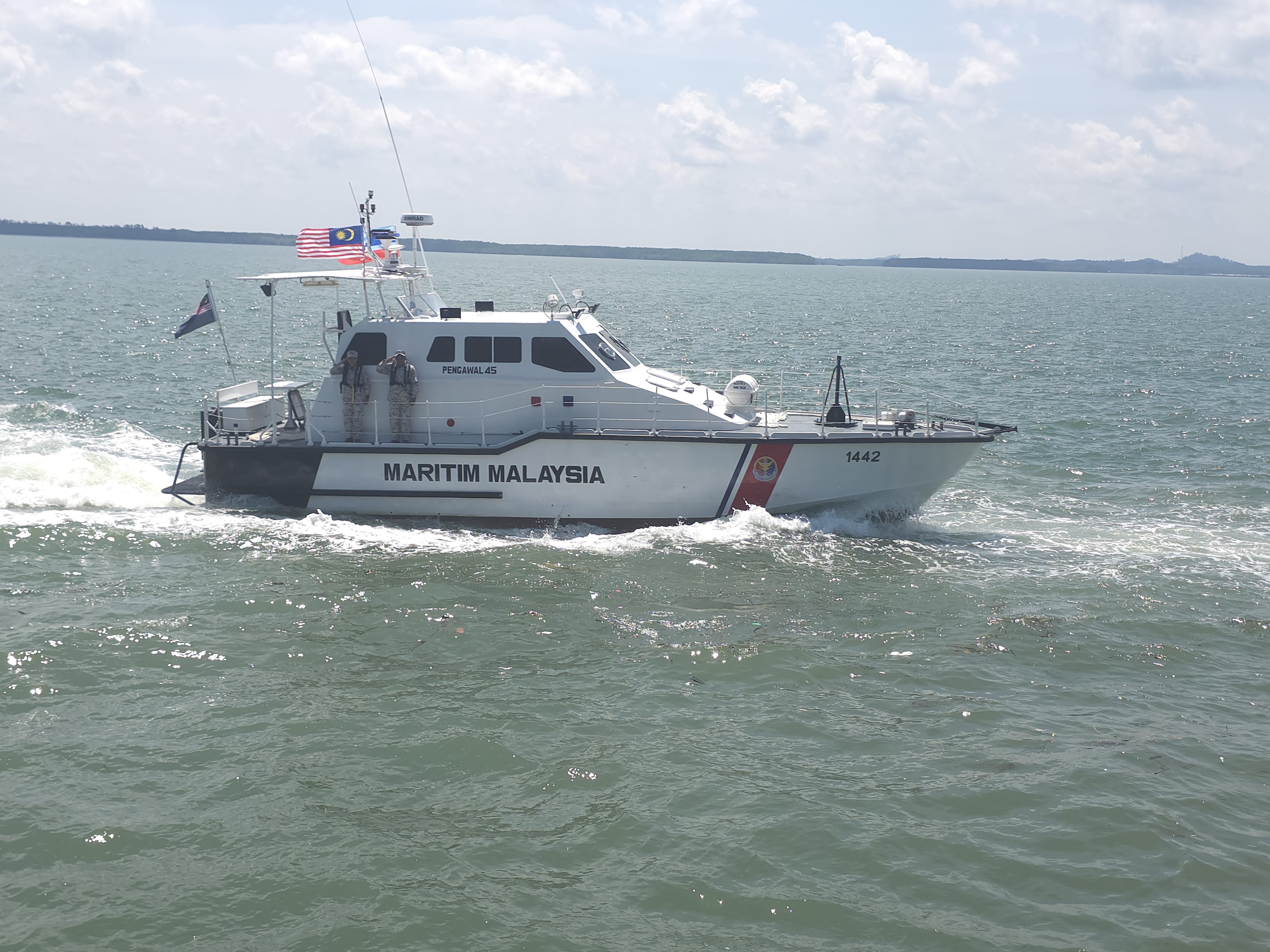
- Pengawal-class in MMEA service

Class overview
- Name: Pengawal 14m
- Operators: Malaysian Maritime Enforcement Agency; Royal Malaysian Navy

General characteristics
- Displacement: 18.6 tons
- Length: 14.8 m (49 ft)
- Beam: 2.7 m (8 ft 10 in)
- Draft: 0.8 m (2 ft 7 in)
- Propulsion: Main engine: MTU 8V183 TE76 water jet
- Speed: 30 knots (56 km/h)
- Complement: 7
- Sensors & processing systems: Multi-function radar Navigation radar Automatic identification system Global positioning system
- Armament: 2 × 7.62 mm machine guns

Pengawal 14m-class boat is a patrol boats operated by the Malaysian Maritime Enforcement Agency (MMEA) and the Royal Malaysian Navy (RMN). Originally, this class of boat was operated by the Royal Malaysia Police (RMP). However, along with the new maritime assets received by RMP, all of these boats transferred their ownership of rights to the MMEA and RMN.

== Specification ==
This boat has a length of 14.8 meters, a beam of 2.7 meters and a draft of 0.8 meters. It is powered by MTU 8V183 TE76 water jet engines and has a speed up to 30 knots. This boat can carry 7 personnel. A total of 27 boats have been built and some have been retired or transferred to other agencies.

== Operators ==
Malaysia

- Malaysian Maritime Enforcement Agency
- Royal Malaysian Navy
