= SME Ordnance =

Malaysian defence company

SME Ordnance Sdn Bhd
- Type: Private Limited Company
- Industry: Industrial; Defence
- Founded: 12 November 1969; 56 years ago
- Headquarters: Batu Arang, Selangor, Malaysia
- Key people: General (R) Tan Sri Dato' Seri Mohd Shahrom bin Dato' Hj Nordin (Chairman)
- Products: Document management systems, firearms, ammunition and pyrotechnics
- Owner: General (R) Tan Sri Dato' Seri Mohd Shahrom bin Dato' Hj Nordin
- Parent: Minister of Defence
- Website: www.smeordnance.com.my

The SME Ordnance Sdn Bhd (SMEO), formerly known as Syarikat Malaysia Explosive Sdn Bhd, is a Malaysian defence company that specialises in the manufacturing and marketing of ordnance. The company is located in Batu Arang, Selangor.

SMEO is a subsidiary company of National Aerospace and Defence Industries Sdn Bhd.

== History ==
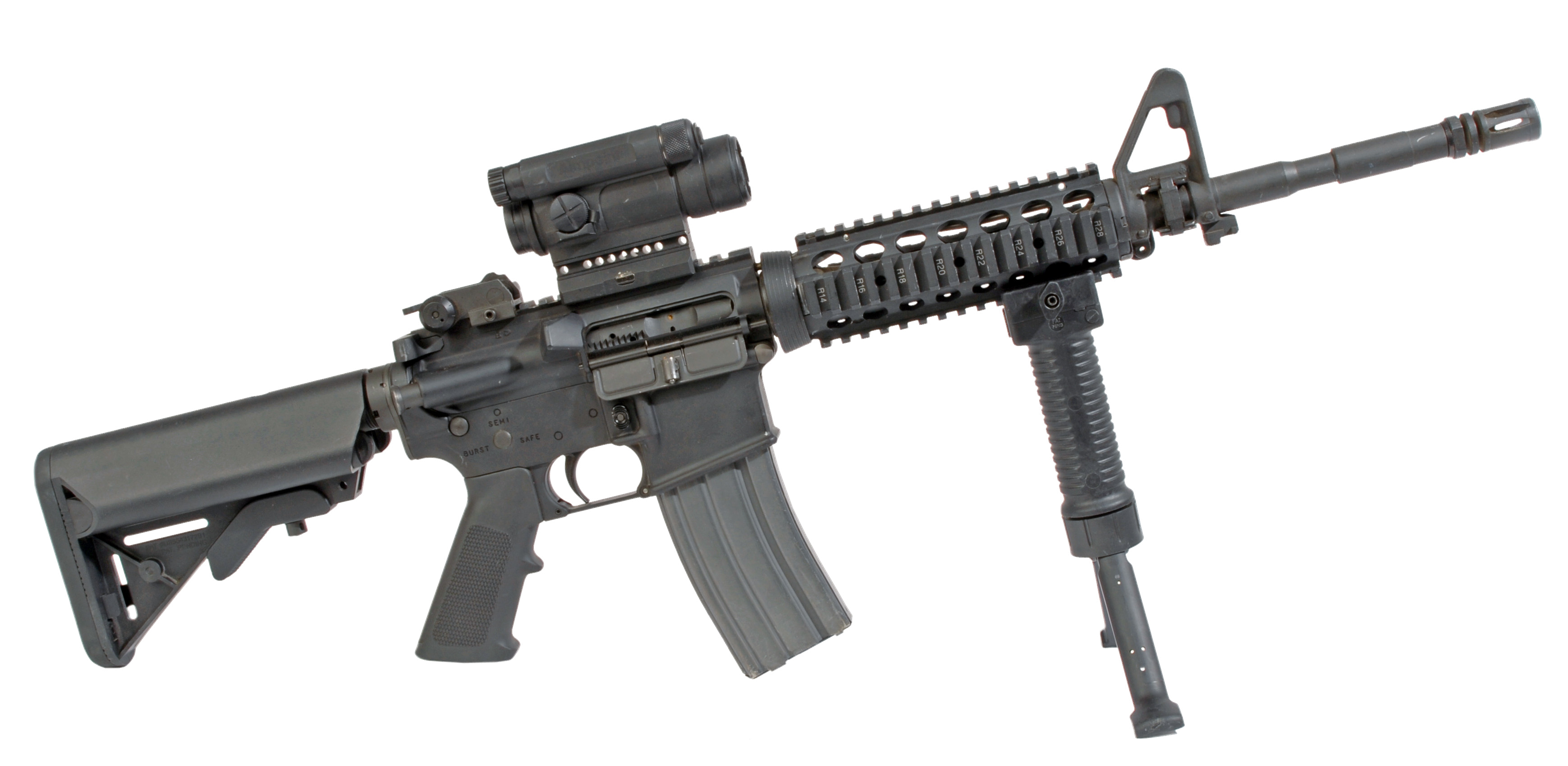
M4 Carbine manufactured locally by SME Ordnance

SME Ordnance was formed in 1969 as a joint venture company with equity participation between the Government of Malaysia, Dynamit Nobel of Germany, Oerlikon Machine Tools of Switzerland and two local partners namely Syarikat Permodalan Kebangsaan and Syarikat Jaya Raya Sdn Bhd. The Malaysian government later acquired all shares in 1974, making SMEO a government-owned company. In 1991, SMEO acquired a licence to manufacture Steyr AUG rifles. Joint production with Steyr to produce the AUG A1/A3 models later started in 2003 and 2004. SMEO later withdrew from joint production.

On 28 September 1993, SMEO was approved by Royal Ordnance Division, British Aerospace (BAe) as the preferred suppliers of weapons and ammunition. The Standards and Industrial Research Institute of Malaysia (SIRIM) bestowed and registered SMEO's quality system as compliant with MS ISO 9002:1991 systems on 7 December 1993. On 21 February 2001, SMEO integrated Syarikat Malaysia Explosive Technologies Sdn Bhd.

SMEO acquired the licence to manufacture M4 carbines in 2006–2007 with Colt Defence, as announced by Datuk Seri Najib Tun Razak after he gave SMEO a letter of intent to procure 14,000 rifles to replace the Steyr AUG. In 2009, SMEO announced that they would invest RM36.4 million for further research and development into the M4 carbine. The amount consists of RM26.4 million, which will be for the purchase of machinery and RM10 million for the buildings. 14,000 M4s will be supplied to the Malaysian army.

Under the ASEAN Defence Industry Collaboration programme, Malaysia plans to produce the M4 carbine together with Indonesia and Thailand and market the weapon to ASEAN countries that want to purchase it.

== Products and services ==
Source :

=== Rifles ===
- Steyr AUG (Not manufactured as of 2005)
- M4 carbine

=== Small arms ammunition ===
- Cal. 0.38 Special (Lead Round Nose)
- Cal. 9 x 19 mm Ball (Luger/Parabellum)
- Cal. 5.56 x 45 mm Ball M193 (Loose/Link)
- Cal. 5.56 x 45 mm Steel Core M855/SS109
- Cal. 5.56 x 45 mm Tracer M196
- Cal. 5.56 x 45 mm Blank M200
- Cal. 5.56 x 46 mm Blank Long Nose
- Cal. 7.62 x 51 mm Ball Nato
- Cal. 7.62 x 51 mm 4B1T
- Cal. 12.7 mm (All Natures)
- Cal. 20 mm Oerlikon (All Natures)
- Cal. 25 mm Bushmaster (All Natures)
- Cal. 30 mm ADEN (All Natures)
- Cal. 35 mm Oerlikon (All Natures)

=== Large calibre ammunition ===
- Rounds 57 mm L70 AA ammunition
- 60 mm and 81 mm mortar bombs
- Rounds 90 mm HE-T/HESH-T
- 105 mm artillery ammunition
- 155 mm artillery ammunition
- 84 mm Carl-Gustav ammunition
- Rounds 105 mm HE
- Aircraft bombs
- Aircraft rockets
- Sea and land mines
- Starburst practice missile refurbishment
- Cast booster
- Demolition charge (1 lb, 10 lb and 25 lb)

=== Pyrotechnics products ===
- Coloured smoke grenades
- 76 mm smoke grenades IR
- Mini flares
- Wire tripflares
- Hand held rockets
- Day and night signal distress
- Ground illuminating flares
- Aviation smoke generator
- Signal cartridge 26.5 & 38 mm
- Thunderflash
- Cart.C.S anti-riot 38 mm
- Hand thrown C.S anti-riot
- High explosives hand grenade
- Detonating cord
- Electric and non electric detonator
- Safety fuzes

== See also ==
- SME Aerospace - Sister company
