= Sepanggar =

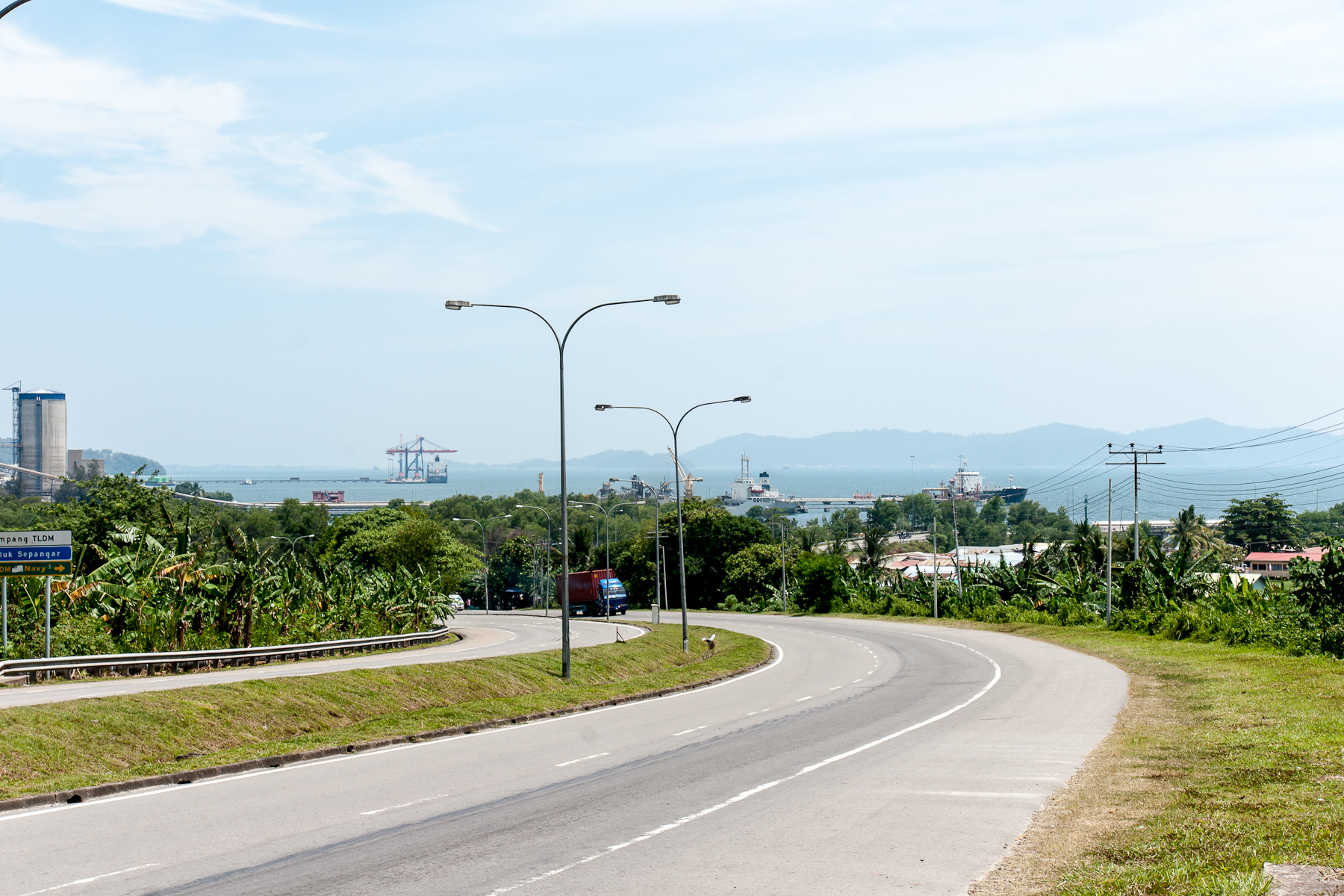
- Highway facing the Sepanggar Bay.

- Location within Borneo
- Coordinates: 6°05′N 116°09′E
- Country: Malaysia
- State: Sabah

Sepanggar is a sub-district of Kota Kinabalu, Sabah, Malaysia. It is located around Sepanggar Bay which houses the Sepanggar Bay Container Terminal, a major naval base for the Royal Malaysian Navy as well as the Sepanggar Bay Oil Terminal. The main campus for Universiti Malaysia Sabah (UMS), Universiti Teknologi MARA Sabah Branch, Kota Kinabalu Polytechnic and Kota Kinabalu Industrial Park (KKIP) are situated here. Sepanggar is also a parliamentary constituency (P.171) with three state legislative assembly constituencies therein, i.e. Karambunai (N.16), Darau (N.17) and Inanam (N.18).

== Features and development ==
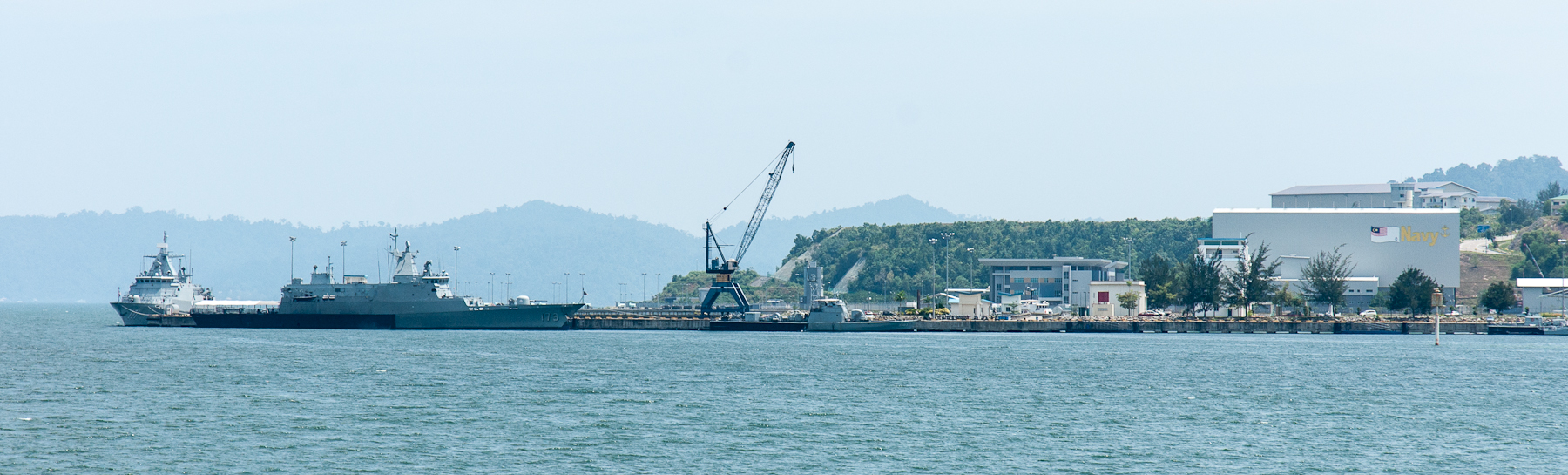
Royal Malaysian Navy base located in Sepanggar Bay.

Sepanggar is currently experiencing a surge in development due to the expansion of Kota Kinabalu. The recently completed Sepanggar Container Port Terminal has taken over all container handling operations from Kota Kinabalu Port. This port was built to complement and help ease the congestion currently experienced at Kota Kinabalu Port. Besides this, various completed and uncompleted projects for residential and commercial purposes have sprouted around Sepanggar; in line with the government's plan to turn Sepanggar into another urban centre or suburb, part of the greater metropolitan area of Kota Kinabalu. The Royal Malaysian Navy is also having a submarine base here, which is to become the Navy's first and principal base throughout Malaysia. On 18 November 2017, the 600-metre-long double-track Sepanggar Tunnel has opened, and the tunnel has two lanes connecting Kota Kinabalu Industrial Park (KKIP) with Sepanggar Container Port and several surrounding areas.
