= Langkawi International Maritime and Aerospace Exhibition =

Biennial exhibition in Malaysia

Coordinates: 6°21′N 99°48′E

Langkawi International Maritime and Aerospace Exhibition Pameran Aeroangkasa dan Maritim Antarabangsa Langkawi
- Status: Active
- Genre: maritime and aerospace exhibition
- Dates: May
- Frequency: Biennial: Odd years
- Venue: Mahsuri International Exhibition Centre; Resorts World Langkawi
- Locations: Langkawi, Kedah
- Country: Malaysia
- Established: 1991; 35 years ago
- Most recent: 2025
- Next event: 2027
- Attendance: 450,000 (2025)
- Organiser: Global Exhibitions and Conferences Sdn. Bhd. (2025)
- Website: https://www.lima2025.com

Langkawi International Maritime and Aerospace Exhibition (LIMA; Malay: Pameran Aeroangkasa dan Maritim Antarabangsa Langkawi) is a maritime and aerospace exhibition which takes place once every two years, held on odd-numbered years. It is held in Langkawi, Malaysia, and the last event took place in 2025. The event is supported by the Malaysian government and industry associations.

LIMA is one of the largest maritime and aerospace exhibitions in the Asia-Pacific region; it is focused mainly on the defence industry, but also supports civilian industries. In 2013, LIMA recorded an overall growth of 10%, with 433 exhibitors from thirty-one countries, 333 defence delegations from thirty-eight countries, 632 media personnel from 127 agencies, sixty-eight ships, and seventy-eight aircraft attending the show. The five-day event also saw 38,421 trade visitors from both defence and commercial sectors from all around the world, as well as 135,691 public visitors.

The exhibitors involved in the event exhibit their products inside the purpose-built Mahsuri International Exhibition Centre (MIEC), adjacent to the terminal at Langkawi International Airport. The maritime exhibitions take place at Resorts World Langkawi, while the aerospace exhibitions take place at the Langkawi International Airport. The venues are all in close proximity to each other.

== History ==
Langkawi International Maritime and Aerospace Exhibition began in 1991, with slightly over 100 exhibiting companies with the aim of making Langkawi the venue for light and experimental aircraft to fly unhampered by heavy traffic, modelled after the EAA Air Venture in the United States. LIMA has now expanded into maritime exhibitions, and is also one of Asia-Pacific's largest maritime and air exhibitions. Nowadays, a four-hour flying display is held daily throughout the show.

=== LIMA 2003 ===
The LIMA 2003 exhibition generated business totalling RM 2.182 billion (US$ 575 million) through thirty contracts, letters of offer and acceptance or intent, and memorandums of understanding.

=== LIMA 2005 ===
LIMA 2005 witnessed a signing of RM 4 billion worth of contracts in maritime and aerospace items. According to the then Defence Minister Datuk Seri Haji Najib Razak that the amount included defence contract RM 3.2 billion, letters of offer worth RM 403 million and letters of intent worth RM 344 million. Najib Razak said that a major portion of the contracts sealed this time was related to the purchase of Airbus A400M aircraft for the Royal Malaysian Air Force, which amounted to RM 2.8 billion including the equipment.

=== LIMA 2007 ===
LIMA 2007 was the successor to LIMA 2005. The air and maritime exhibition mainly consisted of the same concepts.

=== LIMA 2013 ===
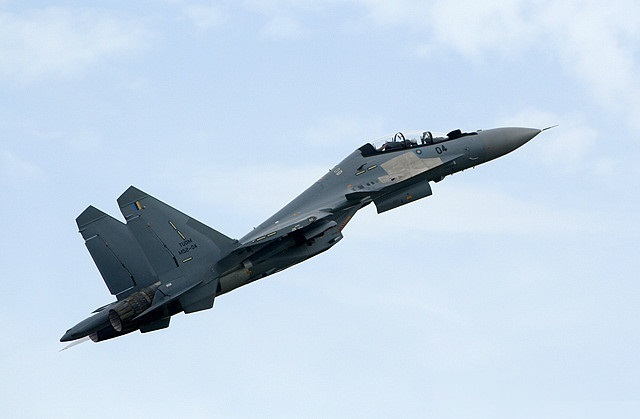
Royal Malaysian Air Force Su-30MKM at LIMA 2013.

The biennial Langkawi International Maritime and Aerospace 2013, was launched on 27 March 2013. The show started with a display of air stunts by the Royal Malaysian Air Force. Among the VIPs who were present was Raja Muda of Perlis Tuanku Syed Faizuddin Putra Jamalullail, Raja Puan Muda Tuanku Hajah Lailatul Shahreen Akashah Khalil, and their two children.

LIMA 2013 recorded an overall growth of 10%. 433 exhibitors from thirty-one countries, 333 defence delegations from thirty-eight countries, 632 media personnel from 127 agencies, sixty-eight ships, and seventy-eight aircraft attended the show. The five-day event also saw 38,421 trade visitors from both defence and commercial sectors from all around the world, as well as 135,691 public visitors.

Daily airshows and maritime stunts were staged for visitors. The shows are conducted by local and foreign military personnel. Vehicles included Zodiac and CB90 boats, Super Lynx and Fennec helicopters. The Malaysian Maritime Enforcement Agency showcased its Kilat and Petir boats with their Agusta Westland, Dauphin and Bombardier aircraft.

LIMA 2013 was hoped to be the cleanest exhibition ever, as the organisers had hired a firm with 150 workers to conduct the cleaning and waste managing throughout the event.

LIMA 2013 witnessed the signing of twenty-four contracts that amounted to RM 4.271 billion, boosting the Malaysian defence technology industry.

=== LIMA 2015 ===
LIMA 2015 was inaugurated on 17 March 2015, and concluded on the 21st. Dassault Aviation had a successful bid, the Malaysian Government expressed interest in buying some of the Dassault Rafale jet aircraft.

=== LIMA 2017 ===
LIMA 2017 saw over 180,000 visitors, compared to about 175,000 visitors during LIMA 2015,. It was expected that there will be a 10% larger crowd during LIMA 2019. LIMA 2017 recorded 555 exhibitors from thirty-six countries, compared to 512 from thirty-six countries in LIMA 2015. The value of contracts and agreements signed this time also rose to about RM 3.7 billion, an increase of 81% from the RM 2 billion, while twelve memorandums of understanding, eleven contracts, seven letters of agreement, and five letters of intent signed were signed.

LIMA 2017 participating forces
Royal Australian Air Force	C-17 Globemaster III
(France) French Air Force	Dassault Rafale
Indonesian Air Force	KT-1B Woongbi
Royal Malaysian Air Force	SU-30MKM; F/A-18D Hornet; Hawk 108; Hawk 208; A400M Atlas; CN-235; PC-7 Mk.II; EC-725; S-61A-4 Nuri
Royal Malaysian Navy	KD Tun Abdul Razak; Super Lynx Mk.100; Fennec
Malaysian Maritime Enforcement Agency	CL-415; AW129; AS365 Dauphin
Russian Air Force	SU-30SM; Il-76
Republic of Singapore Air Force	F-15SG; AH-64D Apache
Republic of Korea Air Force	KAI T-50B
Royal Thai Air Force	Saab Gripen
United States Air Force	B-1B Lancer; KC-135 Stratotanker; MQ-1B Predator
United States Navy	USS Coronado (LCS-4); F/A-18 Super Hornet; P-8 Poseidon; MH-60S Seahawk; MQ-8B Fire Scout

=== LIMA 2019 ===
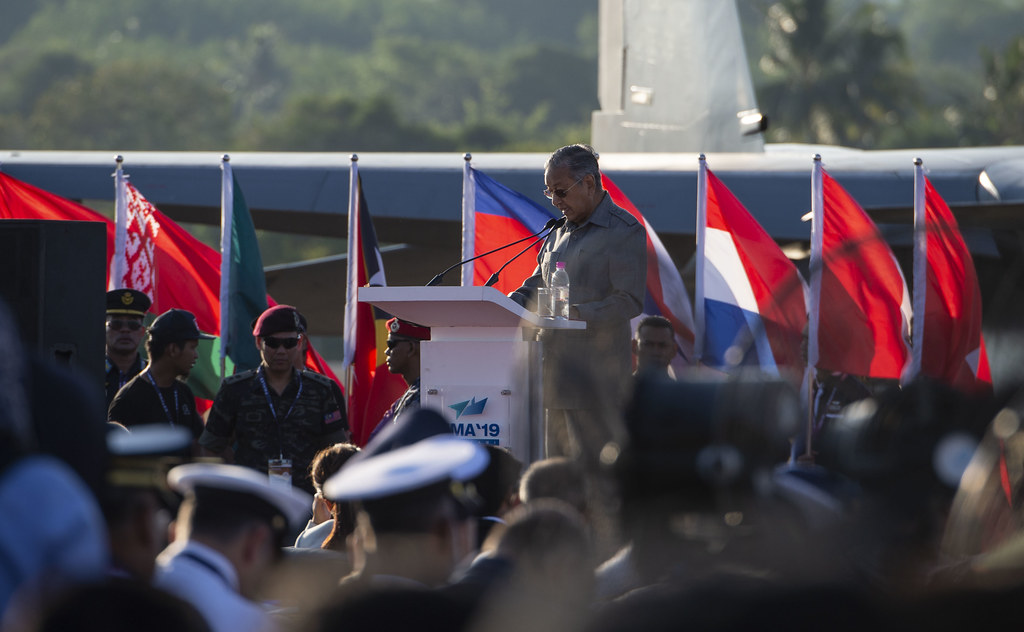
Mahathir launched the LIMA 2019

Prime minister Mahathir Mohamad launched LIMA 2019 after regained his power. He also launched the first edition of LIMA in 1991 when he was the fourth prime minister.

LIMA 2019 participating forces
Royal Australian Navy	HMAS Diamantina (M 86)
Bangladesh Navy	BNS Somudra Joy
Bangladesh Coast Guard	CGS Syed Nazrul
Royal Brunei Navy	KDB Daruttaqwa (09)
People's Liberation Army Navy	PLANS Yueyang
Indian Air Force	HAL Tejas; Il-76; C-130J
Indian Navy	INS Kadmatt (P29); HAL Chetak
Indonesian Air Force	KT-1B Woongbi
Indonesian Navy	KRI Banda Aceh; KRI Halasan
Japan Maritime Self-Defense Force	JS Asagiri
Royal Malaysian Air Force	SU-30MKM; F/A-18D Hornet; A400M Atlas; Hawk 108; Hawk 208; CN-235; PC-7 Mk.II; EC-725; S-61A-4 Nuri
Royal Malaysian Navy	KD Mahawangsa; KD Lekiu; KD Jebat; KD Kasturi; KD Laksamana Hang Nadim; KD Laksamana Tan Pusmah; KD Laksamana Tun Abd Jamil; KD Laksamana Muhamad Amin; KD Gagah Samudera; KD Teguh Samudera; KLD Tunas Samudera; KD Ganyang; KD Pendekar; KD Mahamiru; MV Mega Bakti; Super Lynx Mk.100; Fennec
Malaysian Army	AW109
Malaysian Maritime Enforcement Agency	KM Pekan; KM Bagan Datuk; KM Perwira; KM Marlin; KM Siangin; AW129; AS365 Dauphin
Pakistan Navy	PNS Aslat; Harbin Z-9
Russian Air Force	Yak-130; SU-30SM
Republic of Singapore Air Force	F-15SG; A330 MRTT
Republic of Korea Navy	ROKS Soyang
Sri Lanka Navy	SLNS Sagara
Royal Thai Air Force	Saab Gripen
Royal Thai Navy	HTMS Kraburi; HTMS Longlom
United States Air Force	B-52 Stratofortress; C-17 Globemaster III; KC-135 Stratotanker; MQ-9 Predator
United States Navy	USS Blue Ridge; USS Preble; F/A-18 Super Hornet; P-8 Poseidon; SH-60 Seahawk
Vietnam People's Navy	VPN Ly Thai To

=== LIMA 2023 ===
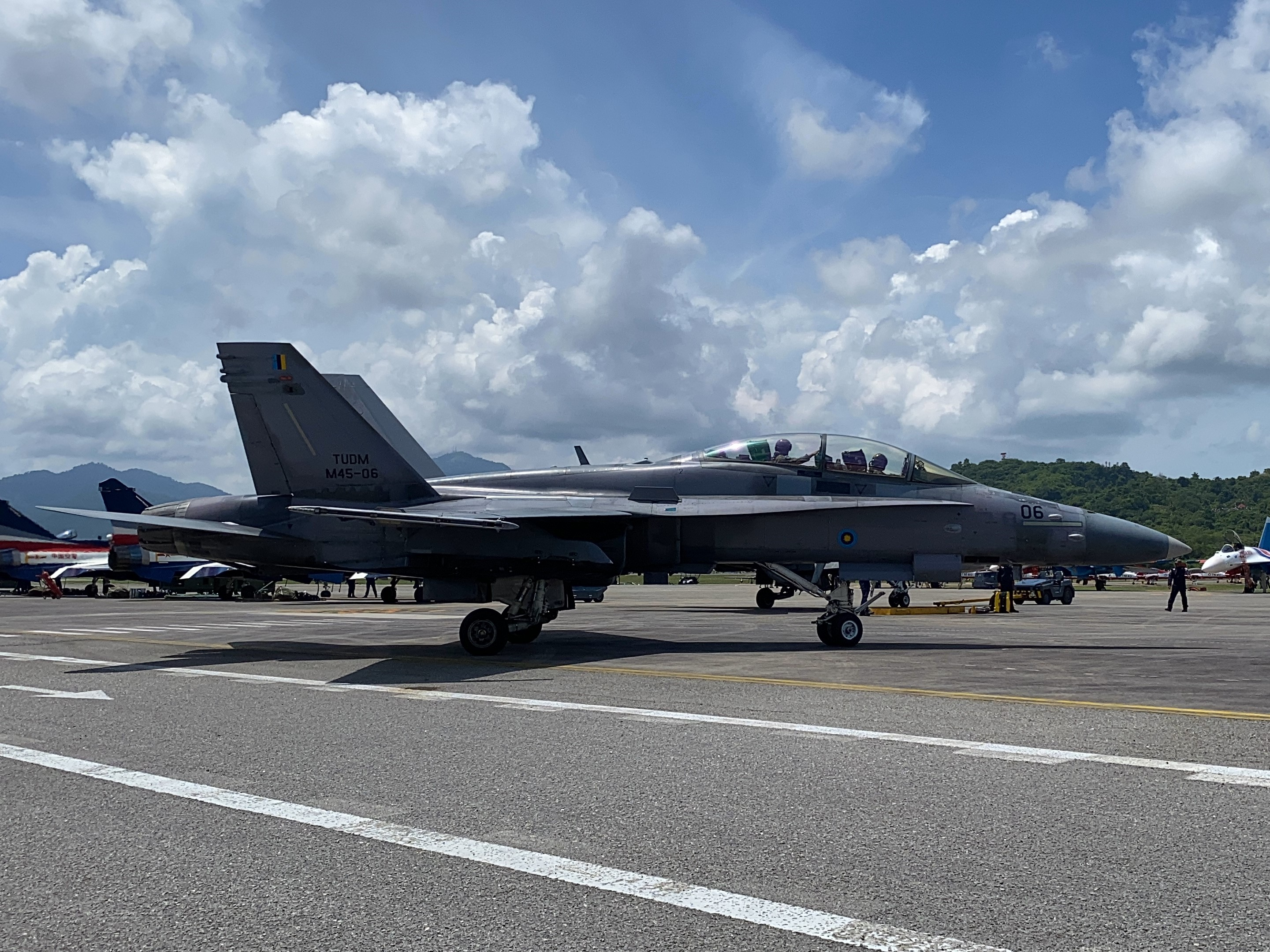
RMAF F/A-18D in action at LIMA 2023

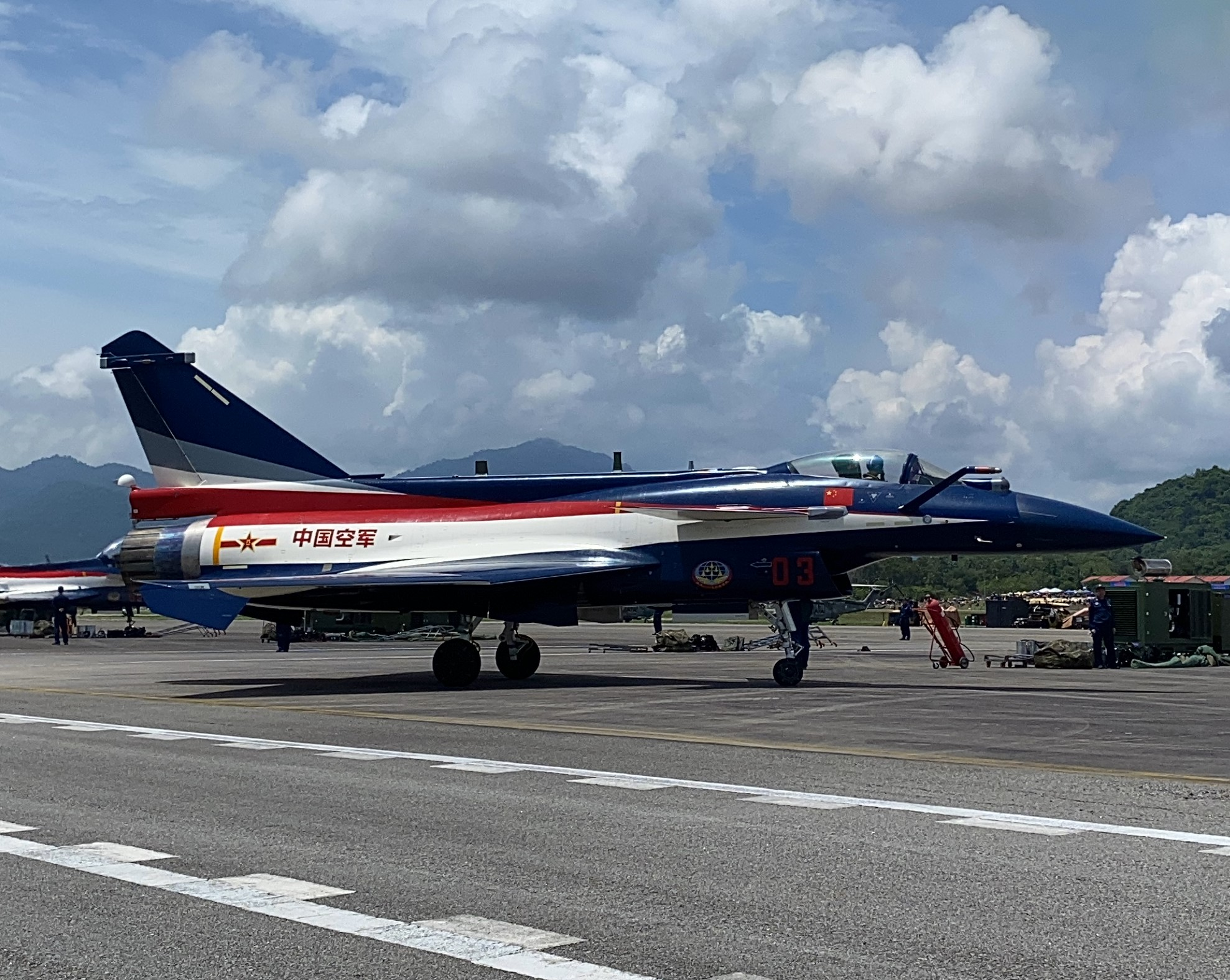
PLAAF J-10C in action at LIMA 2023

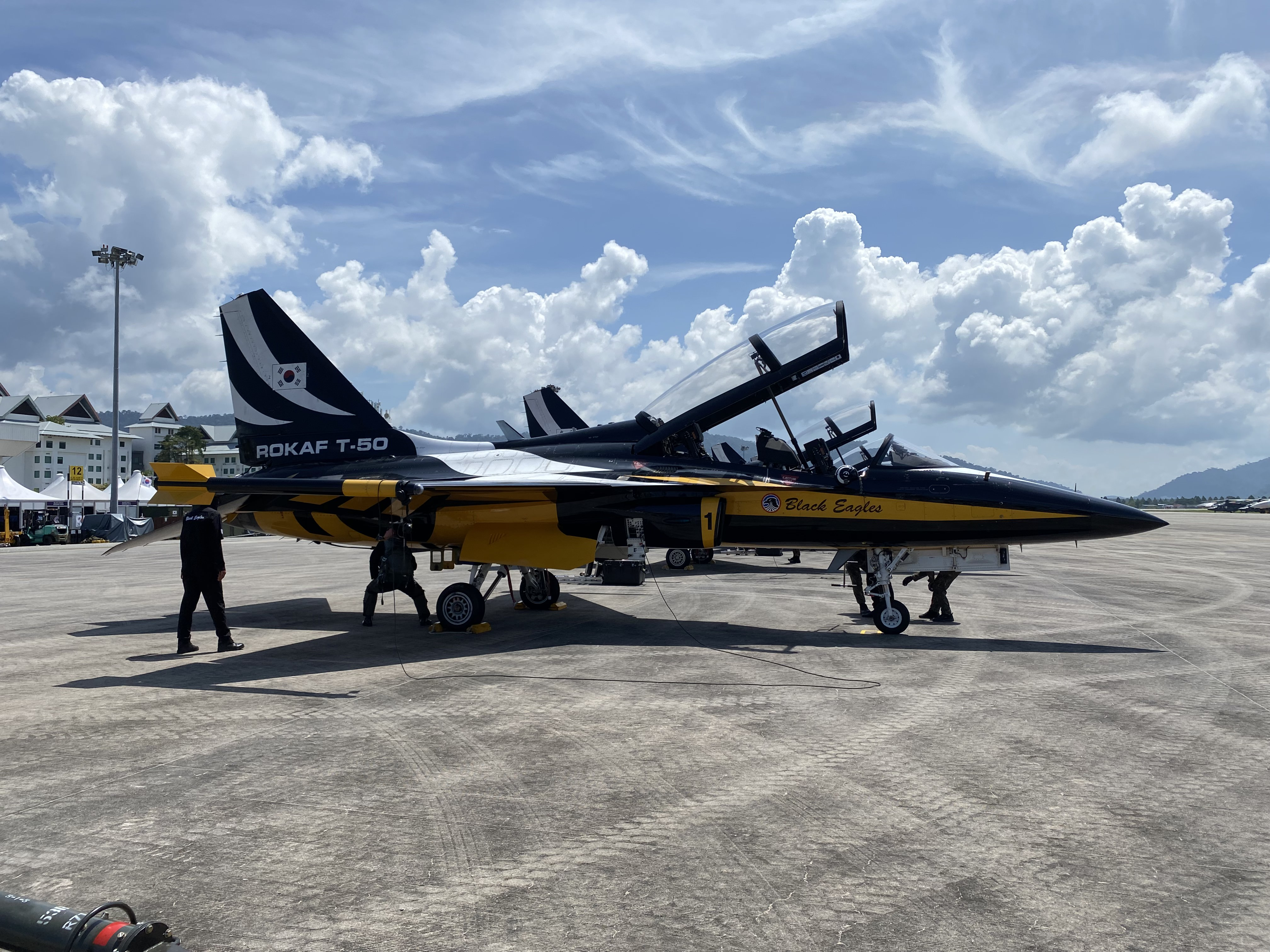
ROKAF T-50 in action at LIMA 2023

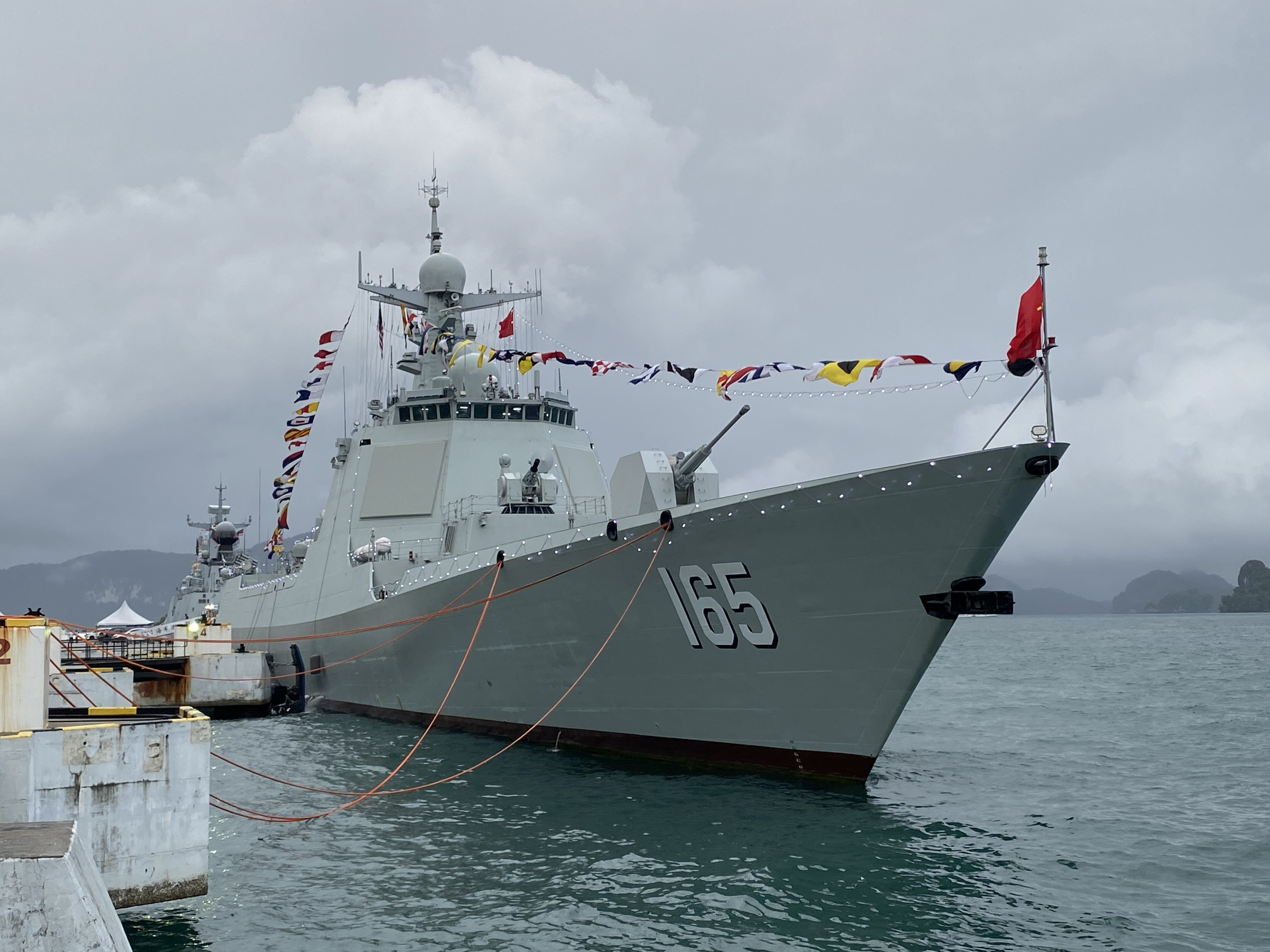
PLAN CNS Zhanjiang at dock

Defence minister Hishammuddin Hussein announced that LIMA 2023 will be held from 23 to 27 May 2023. Around 600 exhibitors from twenty countries are expected to take part in this edition. Aerobatic teams from various air forces, such as the Black Eagles, August 1st, Jupiter Aerobatic Team, Russian Knights, and the Al Fursan took part in the aerobatic display.

LIMA 2023 participating forces
Royal Brunei Navy	KDB Darulehsan (07)
Royal Canadian Air Force	CP-140
People's Liberation Army Air Force	J-10C
People's Liberation Army Navy	PLANS Zhanjiang
Indian Navy	INS Kavaratti (P31)
Indonesian Air Force	KT-1B Woongbi
Indonesian Navy	KRI Golok; KRI Halasan (630); KRI Kerambit (627)
Italian Navy	ITS Francesco Morosini
Japan Maritime Self-Defense Force	JS Kumano
Royal Malaysian Air Force	SU-30MKM; F/A-18D Hornet; Hawk 108; Hawk 208; PC-7 Mk.II; A400M Atlas; CN-235; EC-725
Malaysian Army	AW109; MD530G
Royal Malaysian Navy	KD Mahawangsa; KD Lekiu; KD Tunku Abdul Rahman; KD Pahang; KD Perak; KD Laksamana Hang Nadim; KD Keris; KD Todak; KD Selangor; KD Sri Indera Sakti; KD Gagah Samudera; KD Teguh Samudera; KD Terengganu; KD Lekir; KD Rencong; KD Mahamiru; MV Ganas; MV Perkasa; KLD Tunas Samudera; MV Mega Bakti
Malaysian Maritime Enforcement Agency	KM Pekan; KM Bagan Datuk; KM Arau; KM Perwira; KM Marlin; AW139; AS365; CL-415
Royal Malaysia Police	AW139; AS355
Fire and Rescue Department of Malaysia	Mi-17; AW139; AW189
Ministry of Transport	GB1 GameBird
Pakistan Navy	PNS Shah Jahan
Russian Air Force	SU-30SM; SU-35S; Il-76
Republic of Singapore Air Force	AH-64D; CH-47D
Republic of Singapore Navy	RSS Steadfast
Republic of Korea Air Force	T-50
Republic of Korea Navy	ROKS No Jeok Bong
Royal Thai Air Force	F-5
Royal Thai Navy	HTMS Prachuap Khiri Khan
United Arab Emirates Air Force	MB-339; P.180
United States Air Force	C-130; C-37
United States Navy	USS Mobile; KC-130; P-8 Poseidon; MH-60R
Vietnam People's Navy	VPNS 20

=== LIMA 2025 ===
The 2025 edition of LIMA was held from 20 to 24 May 2025. The number of participating aerobatic teams was reduced compared to 2023. The participating aerobatic teams attending were the Jupiter Aerobatic Team and Russian Knights. The Indian Air Force aerobatic team Surya Kiran was supposed to participate as one of the aerial display teams, but withdrew due to the aftermath of the war at Kashmir. Their withdrawal was announced the day before the airshow.

LIMA 2025 participating forces
Aerotree	Extra 300L
Bangladesh Navy	BNS Khalid Bin Walid
Royal Brunei Air Force	S-70i Black Hawk
Royal Canadian Air Force	CP-140
German Air Force	A400M Atlas
Indian Navy	INS Kavaratti (P31)
Indonesian Air Force	KT-1B Woongbi
Indonesian Navy	KRI Bung Karno (369); KRI Kerambit (627)
Italian Navy	ITS Antonio Marceglia (F597)
Japan Maritime Self-Defense Force	JS Yahagi
Royal Malaysian Air Force	SU-30MKM; F/A-18D Hornet; PC-7 Mk.II; A400M Atlas; CN-235; EC-725
Malaysian Army	AgustaWestland AW109; MD530G
Royal Malaysian Navy	KD Lekiu
Malaysian Maritime Enforcement Agency	
Royal Malaysia Police	AW139
Fire and Rescue Department of Malaysia	Mi-17; AW139; AW189
Layang-layang Flying School	GB1 GameBird
Russian Air Force	SU-30SM; SU-35S; Il-76
Russian Navy	Hero of the Russian Federation Aldar Tsydenzhapov; Steregushchiy
Republic of Singapore Air Force	CH-47D; F-15SG
Republic of Singapore Navy	RSS Steadfast (70)
Royal Thai Navy	HTMS Krabi
Turkish Navy	TCG Büyükada (F-512)
United States Air Force	C-130J
United States Navy	USS Lenah Sutcliffe Higbee (DDG-123); F/A-18E/F; Beechcraft C-12 Huron; MH-60R
