= Arau (disambiguation) =

Arau is a town in Malaysia and royal capital of Perlis. It may also refer to:

== Constituencies ==
- Arau (federal constituency), represented in the Dewan Rakyat
- Arau (state constituency), formerly represented in the Perlis State Council (1955–59) and the Perlis State Legislative Assembly (1959–74) - see List of Malaysian State Assembly Representatives (1969–1974)

== People ==
- Alfonso Arau (born 1932), Mexican filmmaker and actor
- Fernando Arau (born 1953), Mexican comedian, actor, producer and director, son of Alfonso Arau
- Sergio Arau (born 1951), Mexican musician, singer-songwriter, screenwriter, film director and producer, and music producer, son of Alfonso Arau

== Other uses ==
- KM Arau, a Malaysian Coast Guard patrol vessel

== See also ==
- Bandar Arau (state constituency), formerly represented in the Perlis State Legislative Assembly (1974–86) - see List of Malaysian State Assembly Representatives (1982–1986)
- Aarau, a town in Switzerland
