= Gagah Samudera-class training ship =

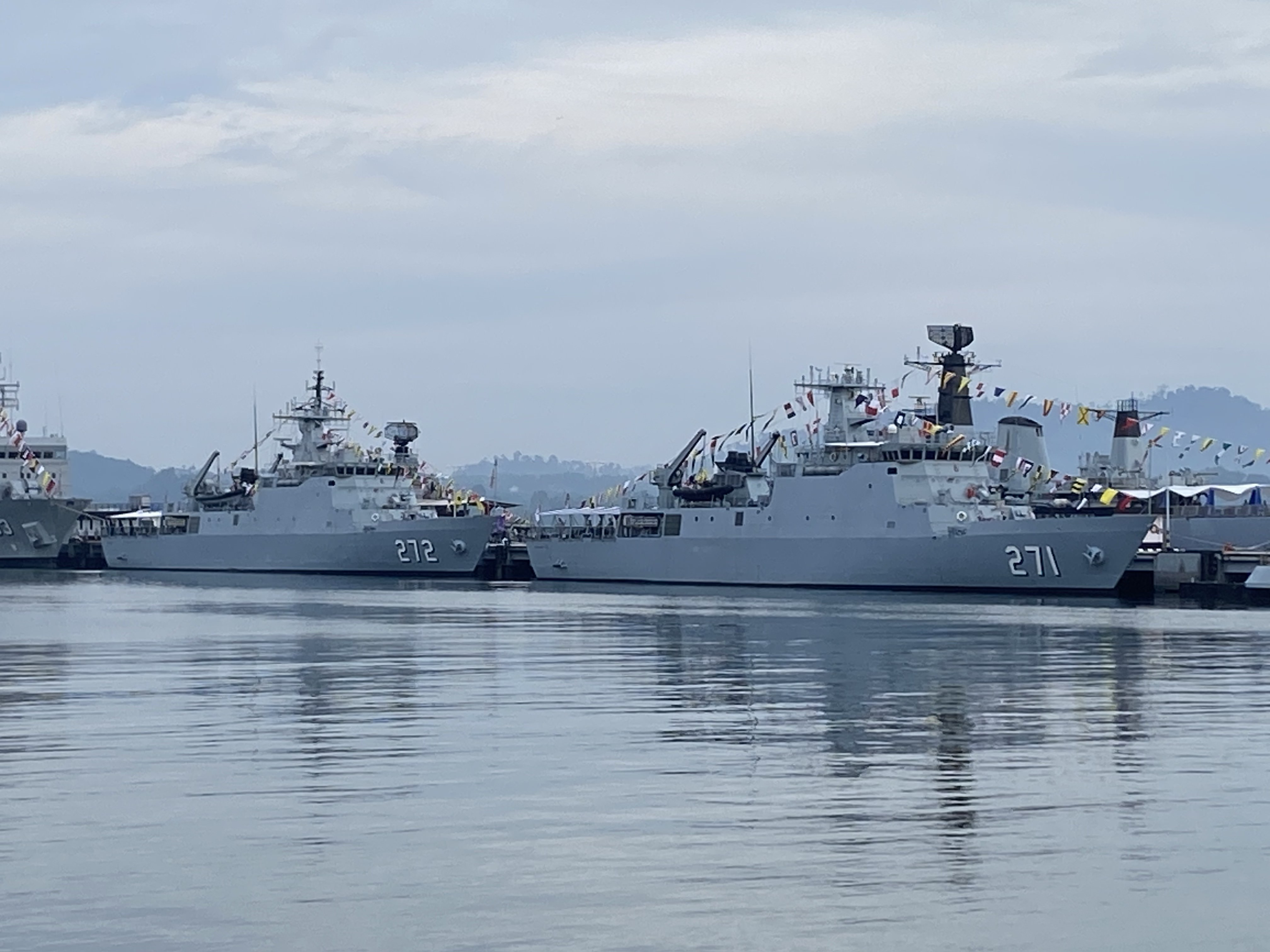
- KD Gagah Samudera and her sister ship KD Teguh Samudera

Class overview
- Name: Gagah Samudera class
- Builders: DSME South Korea; NGV Tech Malaysia
- Operators: Royal Malaysian Navy
- Preceded by: KD Hang Tuah (as a training ship); KLD Tunas Samudera
- Completed: 2
- Active: 2

General characteristics
- Type: Training ship / Offshore patrol vessel
- Displacement: 1270 tons
- Length: 76 m (249 ft)
- Beam: 11 m (36 ft)
- Draught: 3.15 m (10.3 ft)
- Propulsion: 2x MAN Diesel engines
- Speed: 22 knots (41 km/h; 25 mph)
- Range: 2,500 nmi (4,600 km; 2,900 mi)
- Endurance: 21 days
- Crew: 45
- Sensors & processing systems: Combat management system: Hanwha Naval Shield ICMS; Navigation radar: Kelvin Hughes SharpEye
- Armament: 1 x MSI DS30B 30 mm cannon; 2 x M2HB Browning 12.7 mm machine guns
- Aviation facilities: Helicopter landing platform

The Gagah Samudera class is a class of training ships of the Royal Malaysian Navy (RMN). The two ships were built jointly by Malaysia and South Korea under a shared development program, with one ship built in South Korea and the other in Malaysia, The ships, named KD Gagah Samudera and KD Teguh Samudera are currently in service. All RMN ships carry the prefix KD (Malay: Kapal Di-Raja, literally "Royal Ship")

Both are 76 metres (249 ft 4 in) long, have a helicopter deck and are capable of operating up to 2,500 nautical miles (4,600 km; 2,900 mi) for up to 21 days. The ships are equipped with modern air and surface search radar, navigational radar, combat system and communications.

== Role ==
Both ships are currently used for training and are able to accommodate up to 60 trainees, including separate quarters for up to 12 females and both ships can conduct limited combat operation beside their primary training role.

== Armament ==
The class is armed with a DS30B 30 mm cannon and two Browning .50-calibre machine guns. They both have the for but not with concept where missiles and torpedoes such as the Rolling Airframe surface-to-air missile, Exocet MM40 anti-ship missile and triple torpedo launchers may be installed when required. For aviation, both ships are able to accommodate a medium-size helicopter for anti-surface and anti-submarine duties. Due to these capabilities, the ships may also be used as a patrol vessel.

== Ship of the class ==
Pennant	Name	Builders	Launched	Commissioned	Division/Squadron	Notes
271	KD Gagah Samudera	DSME	14 Dec 2012	26 April 2018	27th Training Squadron	
272	KD Teguh Samudera	NGV Tech	27 Feb 2013	26 April 2018	27th Training Squadron	
