= KD Lekir =

Corvette of the Royal Malaysian Navy

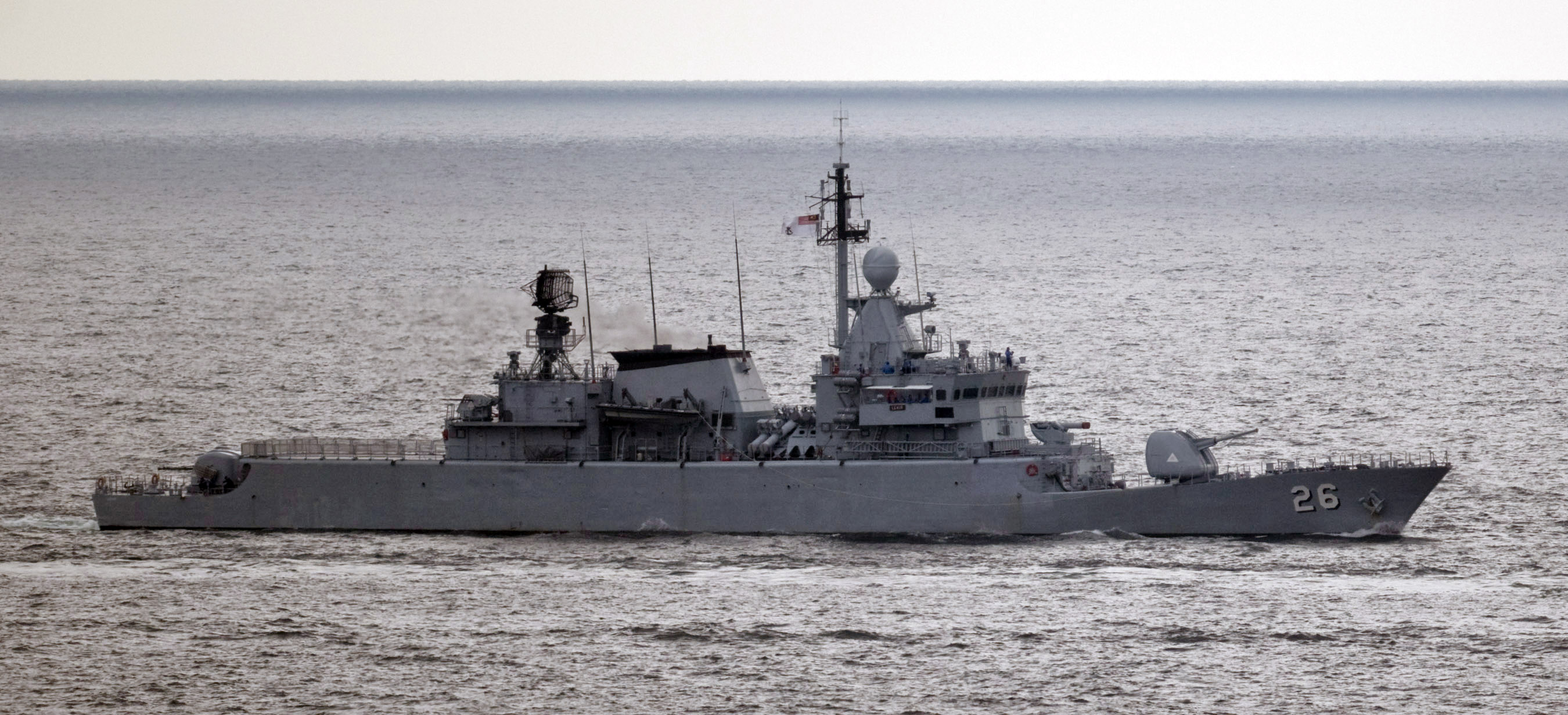
- KD Lekir (F26)

History

Malaysia
- Name: KD Lekir
- Builder: Howaldtswerke-Deutsche Werft
- Launched: May 1983
- Commissioned: August 1984
- Status: In active service
- Badge

General characteristics
- Class & type: Kasturi-class corvette
- Displacement: 1,850 long tons (1,880 t) full load
- Length: 98 m (321 ft 6 in)
- Beam: 11.5 m (37 ft 9 in)
- Draught: 3.5 m (11 ft 6 in)
- Propulsion: 4 × MTU 20V 1163 TB92 diesels; 23,460 bhp (17,490 kW); 2 shafts
- Speed: 28 knots (32 mph; 52 km/h)
- Range: 5,000 mi (8,000 km)
- Complement: 124
- Sensors & processing systems: TACTICOS Combat Management System; Thales Link Y Mk 2.5; DA-08 search radar; WM-22 fire control radar; DSQS-24C sonar
- Electronic warfare & decoys: DR3000S ESM suite; Scimitar jammers; SKWS decoys
- Armament: Guns: 1 × Bofors 57 mm gun; 2 × MSI DS30B 30 mm cannon; Anti-ship: 8 × Exocet MM40 Block 2; Anti-submarine: 2 × triple Eurotorp B515 with A244-S ASW torpedoes
- Aircraft carried: 1 × Super Lynx 300 helicopter
- Aviation facilities: Helicopter landing platform

KD Lekir is the second ship of Kasturi-class corvette currently serving in the Royal Malaysian Navy. Together with her sister ship Kasturi, Lekir serves in the 22nd Corvette Squadron of the Royal Malaysian Navy.

== Construction and career ==
Lekir was built by the German Howaldtswerke-Deutsche Werft (HDW) shipyard. She was launched on 14 May 1983 and commissioned on 15 August 1984.

In October 2011, Lekir underwent an extensive modernisation known as Service Life Extension Program (SLEP) and it was completed in November 2014. Like her sister ship Kasturi, the upgraded consisted of TACTICOS Combat Management System from Thales to replace the older Signaal SEWACO MA command system. The DR3000S Electronic Support Measures suite and Therma SKWS Decoy Launching System were also installed. The DA-08 search radar and the WM22 fire control radar were overhauled and the Thales MIRADOR electro-optical sensor replaced the Signaal LIOD optronic director. For anti-submarine warfare, a DSQS-24C hull-mounted sonar from Atlas Elektronik was installed to complement the new torpedo-launch capabilities.

During Exercise Taming Sari 21/2022 that took place between 16 and 20 May 2022 in the Strait of Malacca, Lekir live-fired an Exocet MM40 missile.

Lekir fired the Exocet MM40 missile during the RIMPAC exercise that took place between 29 June until 4 August 2022 off Hawaii. In March 2026, the ship participated in the Royal Australian Navy's Exercise Kakadu Fleet Review on Sydney Harbour.
