= Handalan-class missile boat =

Class of small Malaysian warships

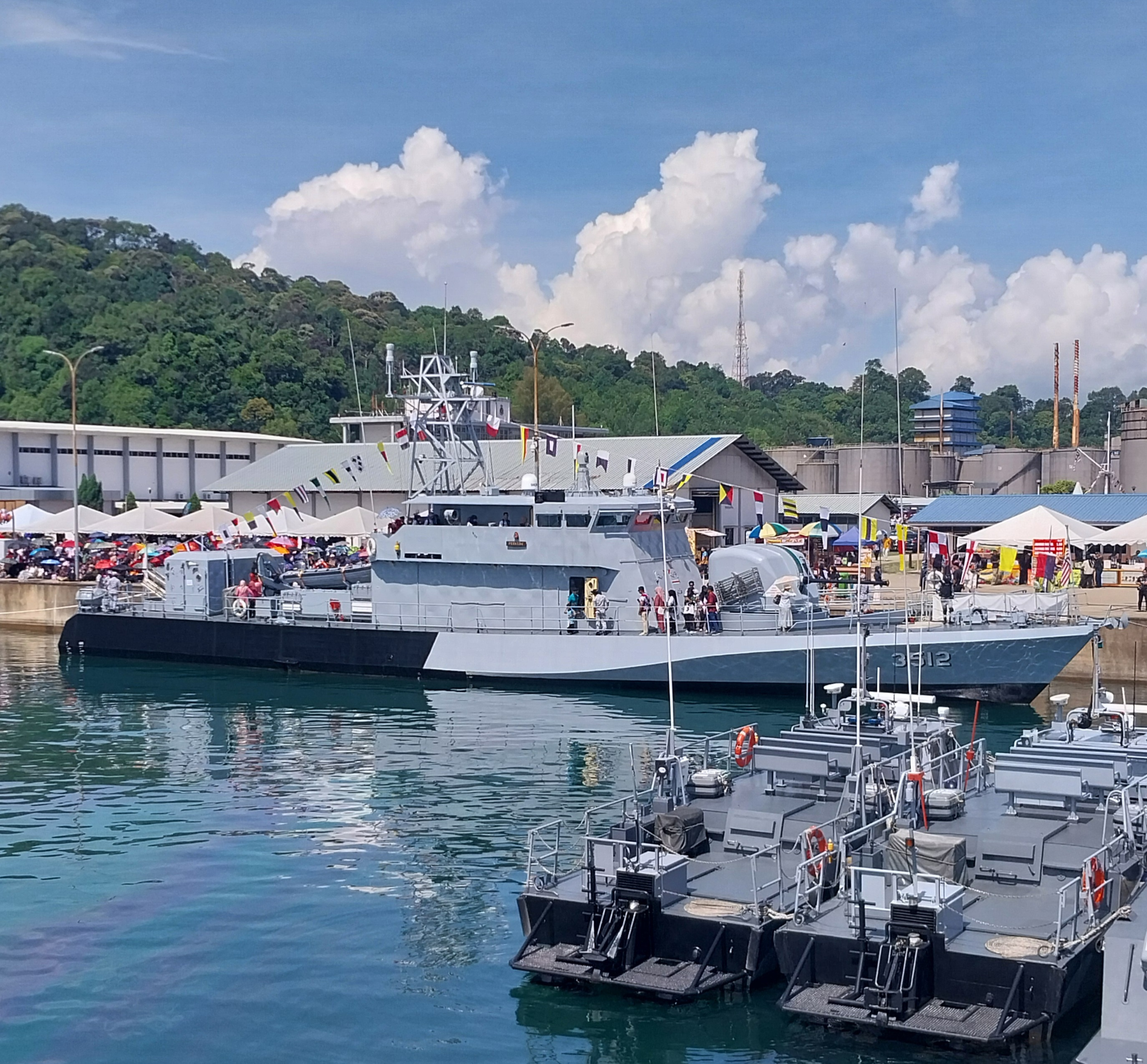
- KD Perkasa and combat boat in Royal Malaysian Navy open day

Class overview
- Name: Handalan class
- Builders: Kalskrona Varvet
- Operators: Royal Malaysian Navy
- In commission: 1978–present
- Completed: 4
- Active: 3
- Lost: 1

General characteristics
- Type: Fast attack craft
- Displacement: 240 tons standard, 268 tons full load
- Length: 43.6 m (143 ft)
- Beam: 7.1 m (23 ft)
- Draught: 2.4 m (8 ft)
- Installed power: 3 x MTU 16V 538 TB91 diesels delivering 10,865 hp (8,102 kW)
- Propulsion: 3 shafts
- Speed: 34.5 knots (63.9 km/h; 39.7 mph)
- Range: 2,977 nmi (5,513 km; 3,426 mi) at 14 knots (26 km/h; 16 mph)
- Complement: 40
- Sensors & processing systems: Radar : Philips 9GR600, Decca 1226 radar, Optronic AA fire control radar; Combat system : AMOCS
- Electronic warfare & decoys: Thales DR3000S ESM; ECM MEL Susie-1 with warning element
- Armament: Guns: 1 × Bofors 57 mm gun; 1 × Bofors 40 mm gun; Anti-ship: 4 × Exocet MM38 anti-ship missiles (removed)
- Notes: The missile might be removed due to being obsolete

The Handalan class are a series of Malaysian Navy fast attack craft, based on the heavier Norrköping class and Spica-class. Built by Kalskrona Varvet and ordered in 1976, this class replaced the Perkasa-class squadron on a 1:1 basis, including name transfer.

One of the class' ships, KD Pendekar, capsized off the coast of Johor after it hit an underwater object on the 25th of August 2024.

== Development ==
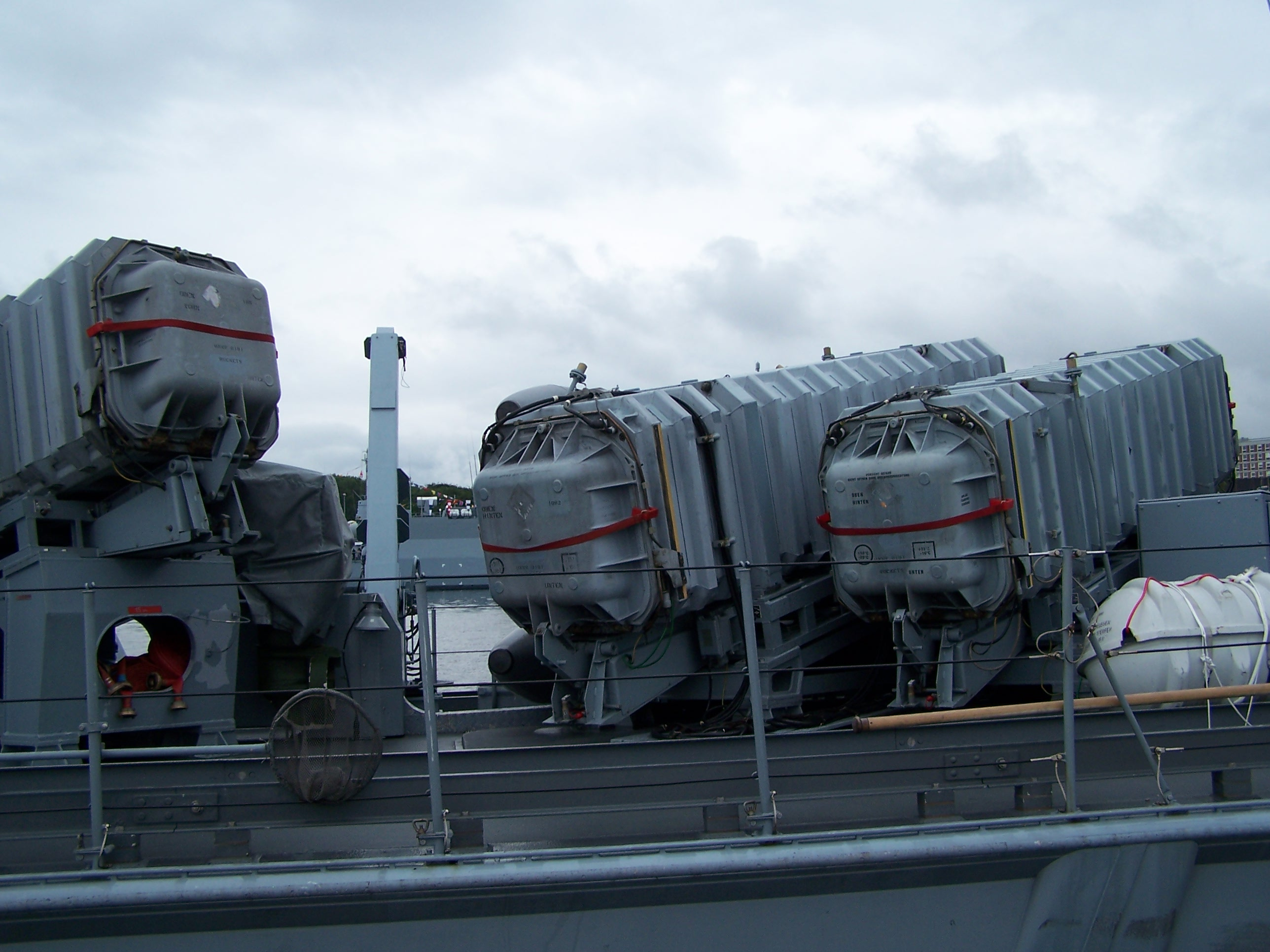
Exocet MM38 missiles

The Handalans are equipped with longer-range diesel engines and an additional weapons fit with launchers for Exocet MM38 missiles and a secondary Bofors 40 mm gun. The installation of additional weaponry from the main Bofors 57 mm gun forced the bridge to be pushed forward to accept the missile launchers and additional rear gun. With a data-link communications system, the class allows the exchange of information through computers with similar equipment, both other ships and shore-based stations. They also have elaborate countermeasures with a Thales DR3000S, electronic tracking equipment and weapon control systems. In all, the Handalans are more capable and better armed than the larger Perdana-class missile boat of the Royal Malaysian Navy. In late 2020 Royal Malaysian Navy confirmed that this class of ship will be upgrade to lengthening service period of older ships.

On 25 August 2024, KD Pendekar struck a submerged object and sank in the South China Sea two nautical miles (3.7 km; 2.3 mi) southeast of Tanjung Penyusop in Kota Tinggi, Johor, Malaysia. All 39 crew members were rescued.

== Ships of the class ==
Pennant number	Name	Commission Year	Status
3511	KD Handalan	1978	Active
3512	KD Perkasa	1978	Active
3513	KD Pendekar	1979	Sunk
3514	KD Gempita	1979	Active

== Bibliography ==
- "Royal Malaysian Navy"
