= Kasturi-class corvette =

Malaysian Navy ship class

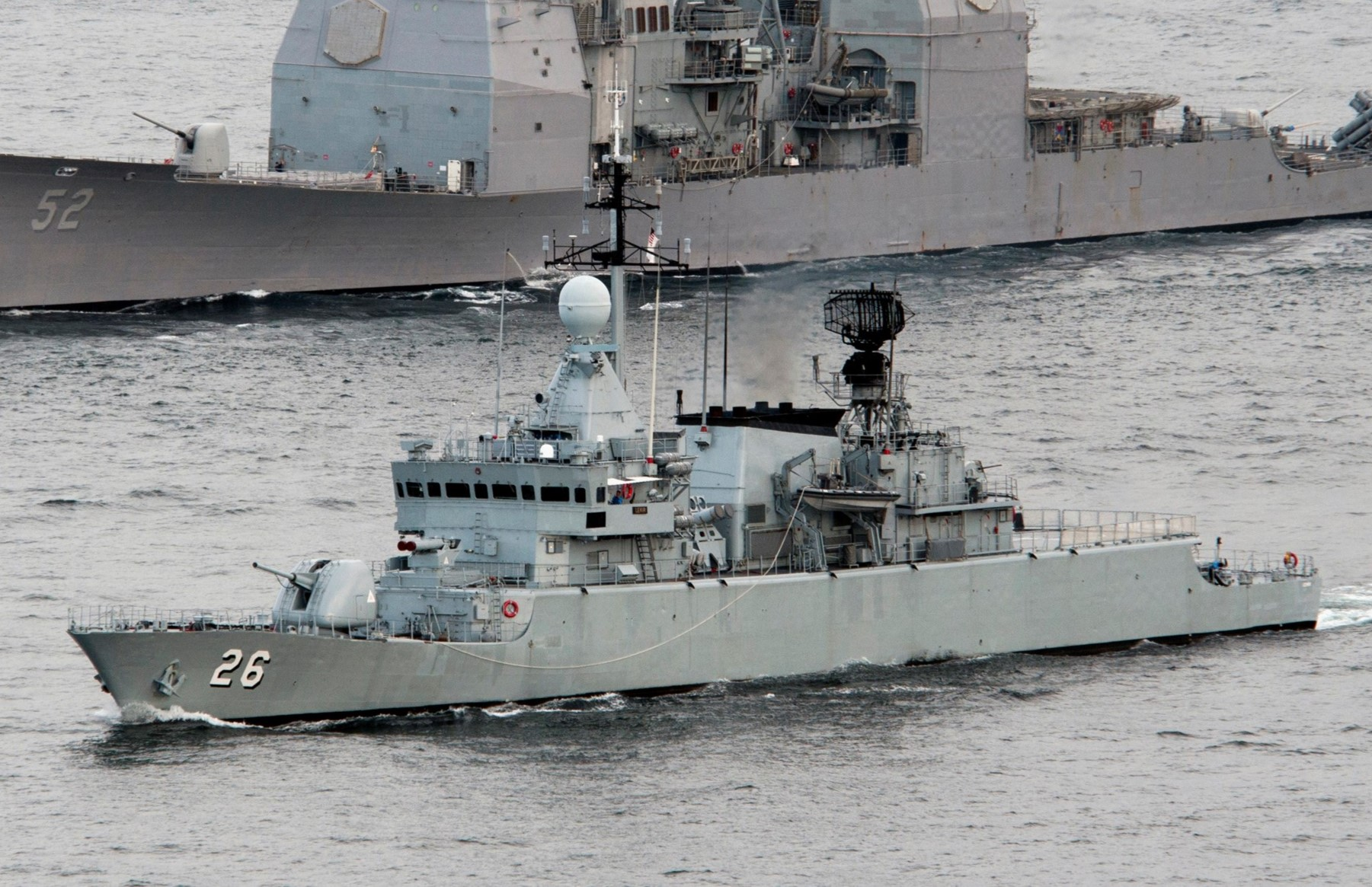
- KD Lekir (F26) with USS Bunker Hill

Class overview
- Name: Kasturi class
- Builders: Howaldtswerke-Deutsche Werft
- Operators: Royal Malaysian Navy
- Preceded by: Laksamana class
- Completed: 2
- Active: 2

General characteristics
- Type: FS 1500 corvette
- Displacement: 1850 tons full load
- Length: 98 m (322 ft)
- Beam: 11.5 m (38 ft)
- Draft: 3.5 m (11 ft)
- Propulsion: 4 × MTU 20V 1163 TB92 diesels; 23,460 bhp (17,490 kW); 2 shafts
- Speed: 28 knots (52 km/h; 32 mph)
- Range: 5,000 nmi (9,300 km; 5,800 mi) at 14 knots (26 km/h; 16 mph)
- Complement: 124
- Sensors & processing systems: TACTICOS Combat Management System; Thales Link Y Mk 2.5; DA-08 search radar; WM-22 fire control radar; DSQS-24C sonar
- Electronic warfare & decoys: DR3000S ESM suite; Scimitar jammers; SKWS decoys
- Armament: Guns: 1 × Bofors 57 mm gun; 2 × MSI DS30B 30 mm cannon; Anti-ship: 8 × Exocet MM40 Block 2; Anti-submarine: 2 × triple Eurotorp B515 with A244-S ASW torpedoes
- Aircraft carried: 1 x Super Lynx 300
- Aviation facilities: Helicopter landing platform

The Kasturi-class corvettes are two ships of the Royal Malaysian Navy, KD Kasturi and KD Lekir. They were acquired in the mid-1980s. The two ships constitute the Royal Malaysian Navy's 22nd Corvette Squadron, their homeport being Lumut. After about 25 years of service, they underwent an extensive modernisation known as Service Life Extension Program (SLEP) starting in 2009, enabling them to be employed for another 10 to 15 years. They have since been returned to active duty.

The two ships of the class are named after Hang Kasturi and Hang Lekir, two heroic figures from the Malay 15th-century epic narrative Hikayat Hang Tuah. They share this characteristic with the two Lekiu-class frigates, KD Lekiu and KD Jebat, as well as the old frigate-turned-training ship KD Hang Tuah, all of which are named after figures from the epic as well.

== Development ==
The class was ordered in February 1981 and built by the German Howaldtswerke-Deutsche Werft (HDW) shipyard. Both ships were simultaneously launched on 14 May 1983 and commissioned on 15 August 1984. Two more were planned but were never ordered. The Kasturi class is based on HDW's FS 1500 design. The two ships constitute the Royal Malaysian Navy's 22nd Corvette Squadron. Their homeport is Lumut at the west coast of the Malayan Peninsula, facing the Strait of Malacca and the Indian Ocean.

== Characteristics ==
=== Sensors and electronics ===
The SLEP modernisation comprised extensive changes to the original configuration of the ships, aimed at both extending their service life as well as improving combat capabilities. The TACTICOS Combat Management System from Thales replaced the older Signaal SEWACO MA command system and the DR3000S Electronic Support Measures suite including the Therma SKWS Decoy Launching System was installed. The DA-08 search radar and the WM22 fire control radar were overhauled and the Thales MIRADOR electro-optical sensor replaced the Signaal LIOD optronic director. A DSQS-24C hull-mounted sonar from Atlas Elektronik was installed to complement the new torpedo-launch capabilities.

=== Armament ===
The Kasturi class original armament was heavily altered by the 2009 modernisation as well. The 57 mm Bofors was moved from the aft to the bow, where it replaced the 100 mm gun as the main gun. No new aft gun was installed. The two manually operated Emerlec 30 mm twin-barrel anti-air guns were replaced with 30 mm single-barrel MSI DS30B guns. Anti-submarine capabilities were enhanced by replacing the dated Bofors 375 mm anti-submarine rocket launcher with two EuroTorp B515 triple torpedo launchers equipped with Whitehead A244-S torpedoes.

There are conflicting reports about the Exocet anti-ship missiles. Some sources state that the Kasturi class prior to the SLEP had been equipped with the Exocet MM38, an old variant of the missile and that the modernisation included an upgrade to the newer and more capable Exocet MM40 Block II variant. Other sources state that the ships had been equipped with MM40 Block II missiles straight from the beginning.

=== Propulsion ===
The Kasturi class is powered by a CODAD propulsion system, provided by four MTU diesels driving two shafts and developing 23,460 horsepower (17,490 kW) driving two controllable pitch propellers. This gives a maximum speed of 28 knots (52 km/h; 32 mph), and a range of 5,000 nautical miles (9,300 km; 5,800 mi) at 14 knots (26 km/h; 16 mph).

=== Aircraft ===
The Kasturi class has a helideck aft suitable for the Royal Malaysian Navy's Super Lynx 300 and Fennec helicopters. Lacking a hangar, it does not carry an embarked helicopter. According to support future mission it will be fitted with hand-launched UAV system as Schiebel has been selected.

== Service Life Extension Program (SLEP) ==
In August 2009, a Service Life Extension Program (SLEP) was awarded to Boustead Heavy Industries Corporation to overhaul the aging corvettes with work to be carried out locally at the Boustead Naval Shipyard in Lumut. By this time, KD Kasturi had reportedly not been operational since 2007 and it would eventually take almost seven years for her to resume operational status in early 2014. KD Lekir remained in active duty until the SLEP work on her began in October 2011 and was completed in November 2014. The SLEP is estimated to have extended the corvettes' service life by around 15 years.

Despite the work being incomplete on KD Lekir at that time, both ships participated in the search for the missing Malaysia Airlines Flight 370 in March 2014.

== Ships of the class ==
Pennant	Name	Builders	Launched	Commissioned	Division/Squadron	Notes
F25	KD Kasturi	Howaldtswerke-Deutsche Werft	May 1983	August 1984	22nd Corvette Squadron	Undergoing refit starting 2021
F26	KD Lekir	Howaldtswerke-Deutsche Werft	May 1983	August 1984	22nd Corvette Squadron	

== Gallery ==
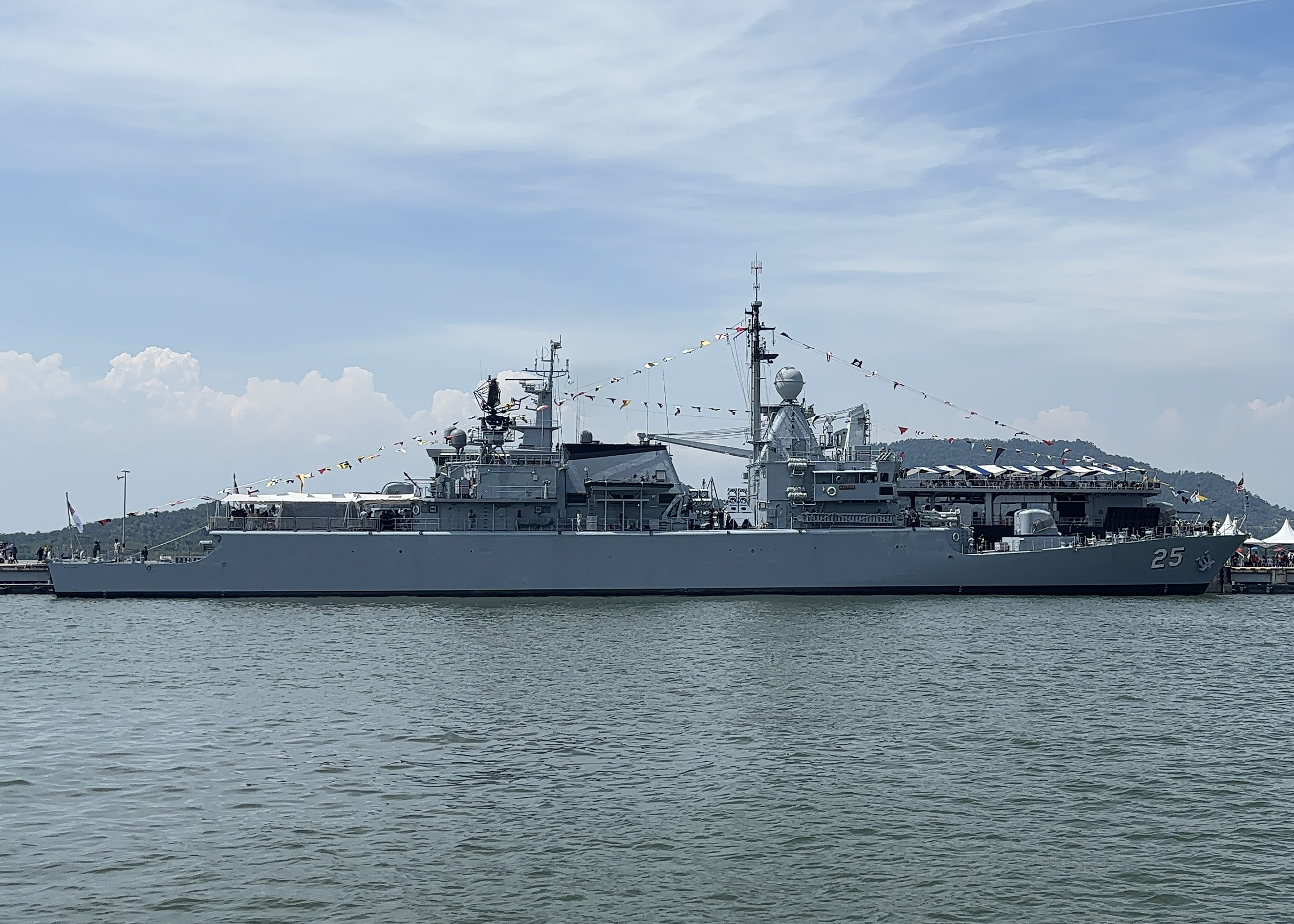
KD Kasturi docking at Lumut Naval Base.

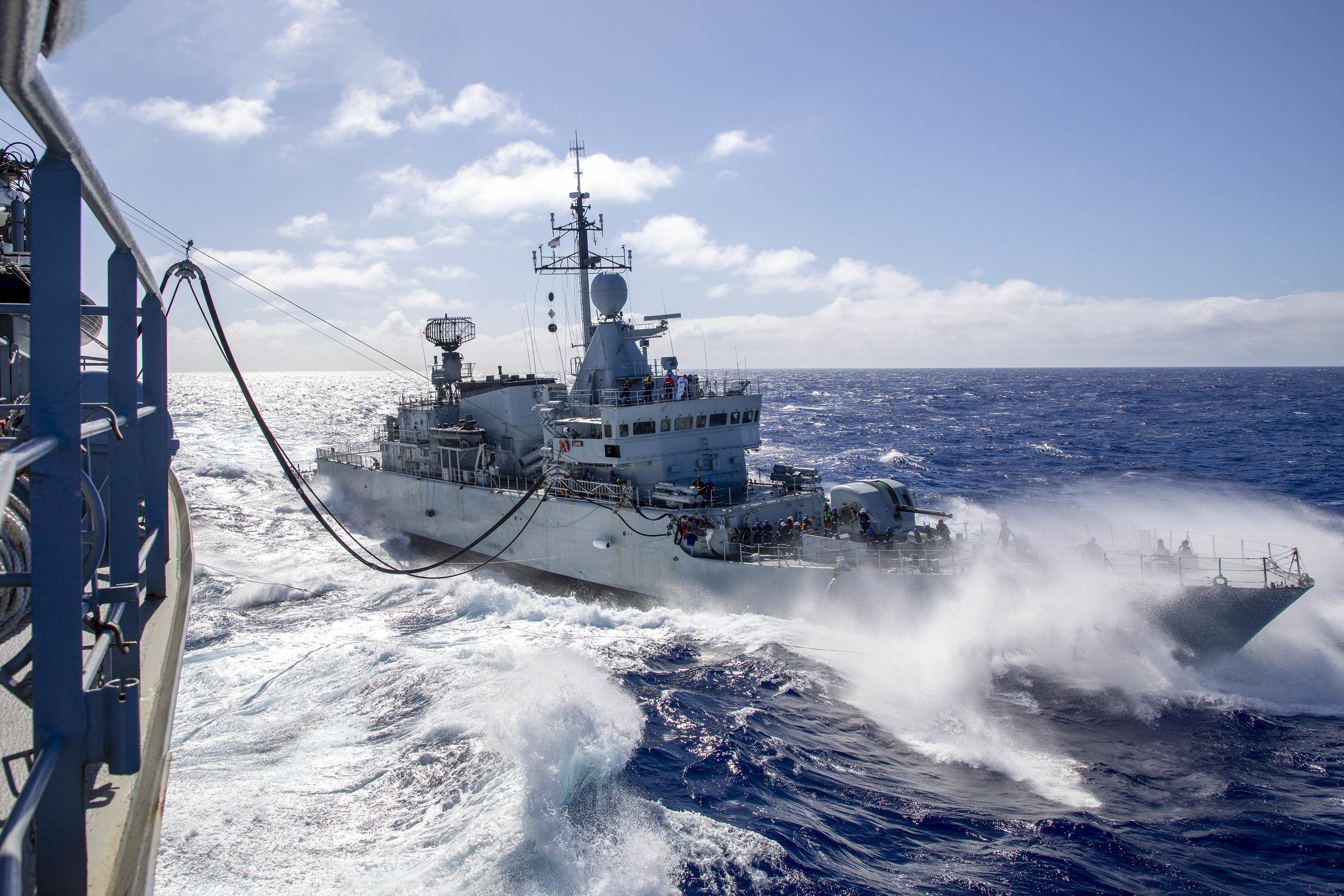
KD Lekir resupplied by Royal Australian Navy HMAS Supply.

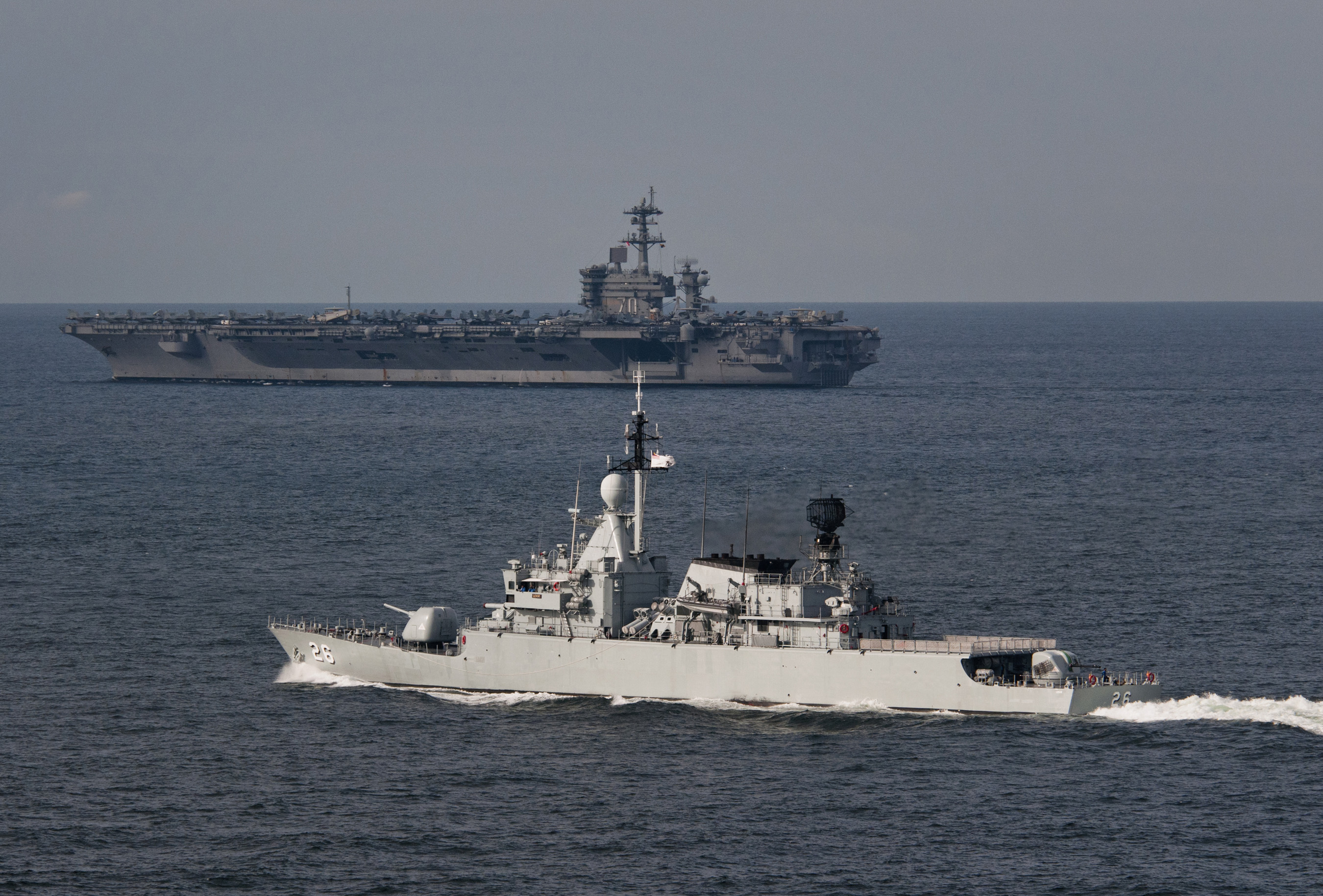
KD Lekir and USS Carl Vinson.

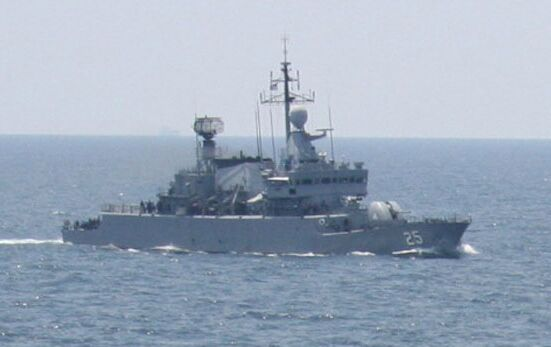
KD Kasturi during SEACAT 2006.

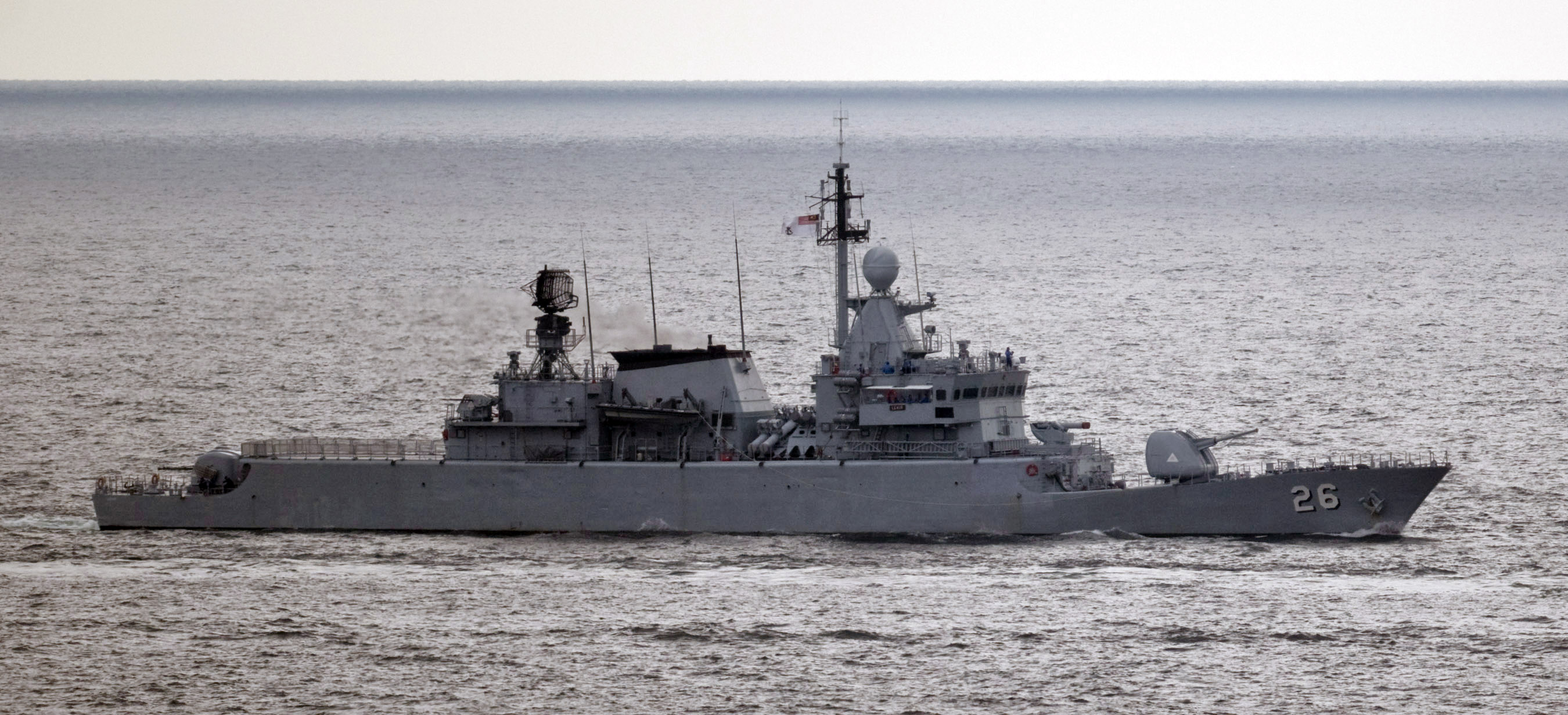
KD Lekir underway in the Strait of Malacca.

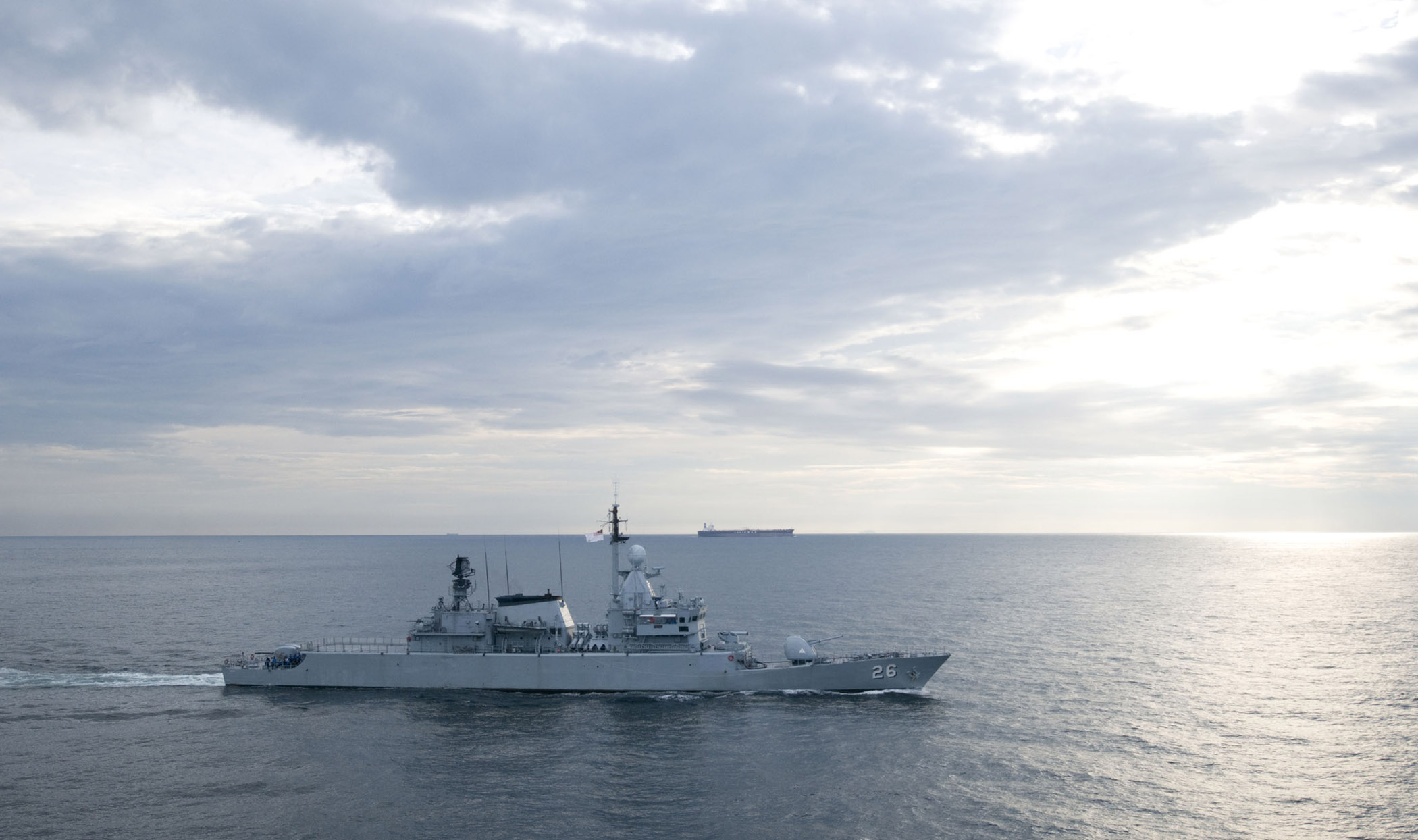
KD Lekir at sea in 2009.

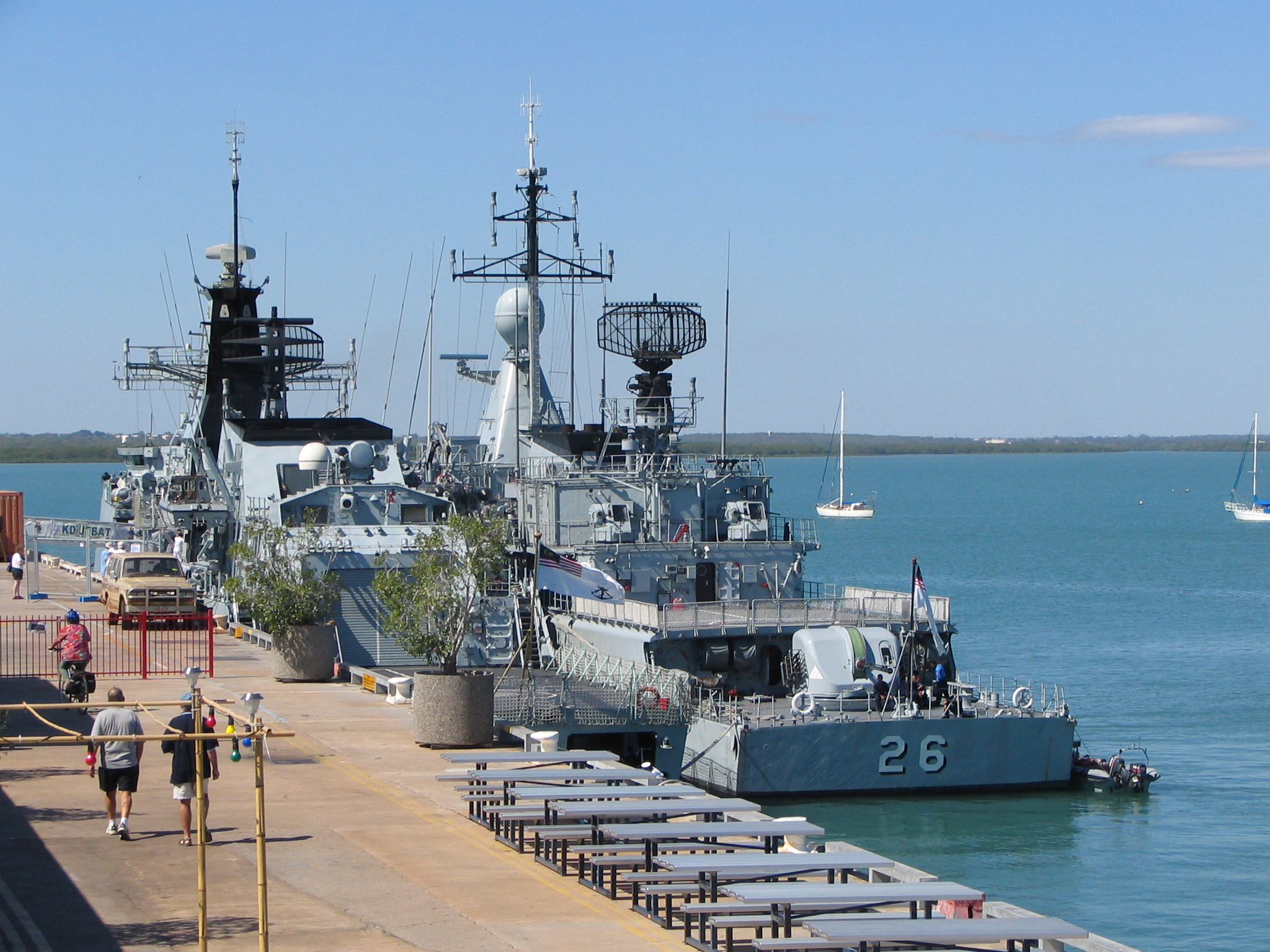
KD Lekir and the Lekiu-class frigate, KD Jebat tied up at Stokes Hill Wharf in July 2005.

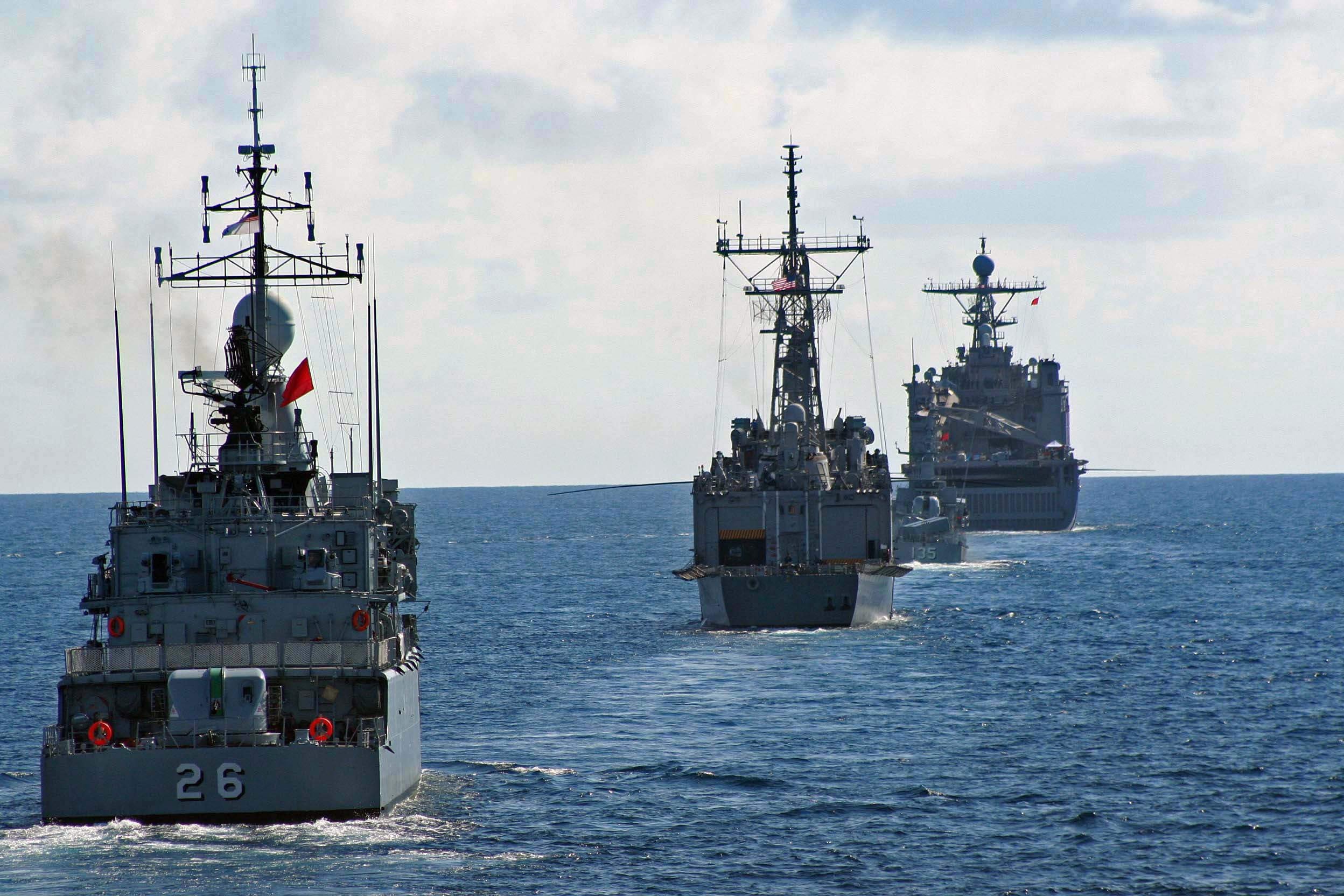
KD Lekir during the CARAT 2008 exercise.

== See also ==
- Almirante Padilla-class – A Colombian ship class also based on the FS 1500 design.
- List of naval ship classes in service

== Bibliography ==
- Baker, A.D. The Naval Institute Guide to Combat Fleets of the World 1998–1999. Annapolis, Maryland, USA. ISBN 1-55750-111-4.
- Gardiner, Robert; Chumbley, Stephen & Budzbon, Przemysław (1995). Conway's All the World's Fighting Ships 1947–1995. Annapolis, Maryland: Naval Institute Press. ISBN 1-55750-132-7.
