= KM Marlin =

Petrol vessel in service with the Malaysian Coastguard

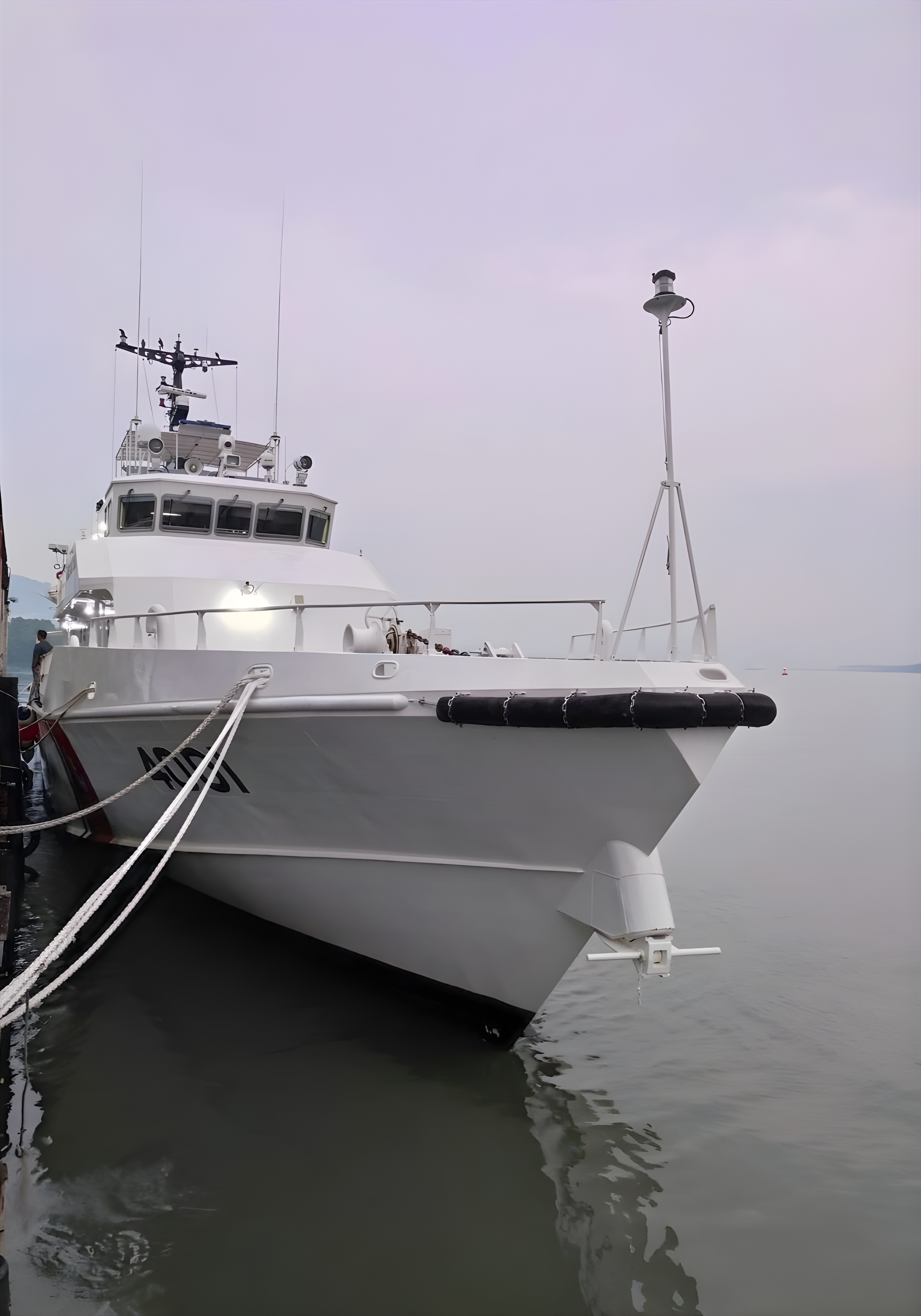
- KM Marlin

Class overview
- Name: KM Marlin
- Operators: Malaysian Maritime Enforcement Agency
- Active: 1

General characteristics
- Type: Patrol vessel and Training vessel
- Displacement: 280 tonnes
- Length: 40 m (130 ft)
- Speed: 20.0 knots (37.0 km/h; 23.0 mph)
- Armament: 1-2 × 12.7 mm general purpose machine guns

KM Marlin is a patrol vessel in service with the Malaysian Coast Guard. She was the first of three ships transferred from Japan, with KM Pekan and KM Arau following. Marlin was transferred in 2006 where ten crew from Malaysian Coast Guard were sent to take over command of the vessel. Apart from patrol duties, KM Marlin is also used as training vessel by the Malaysian Coast Guard.
