= KD Kasturi =

Corvette of the Royal Malaysian Navy

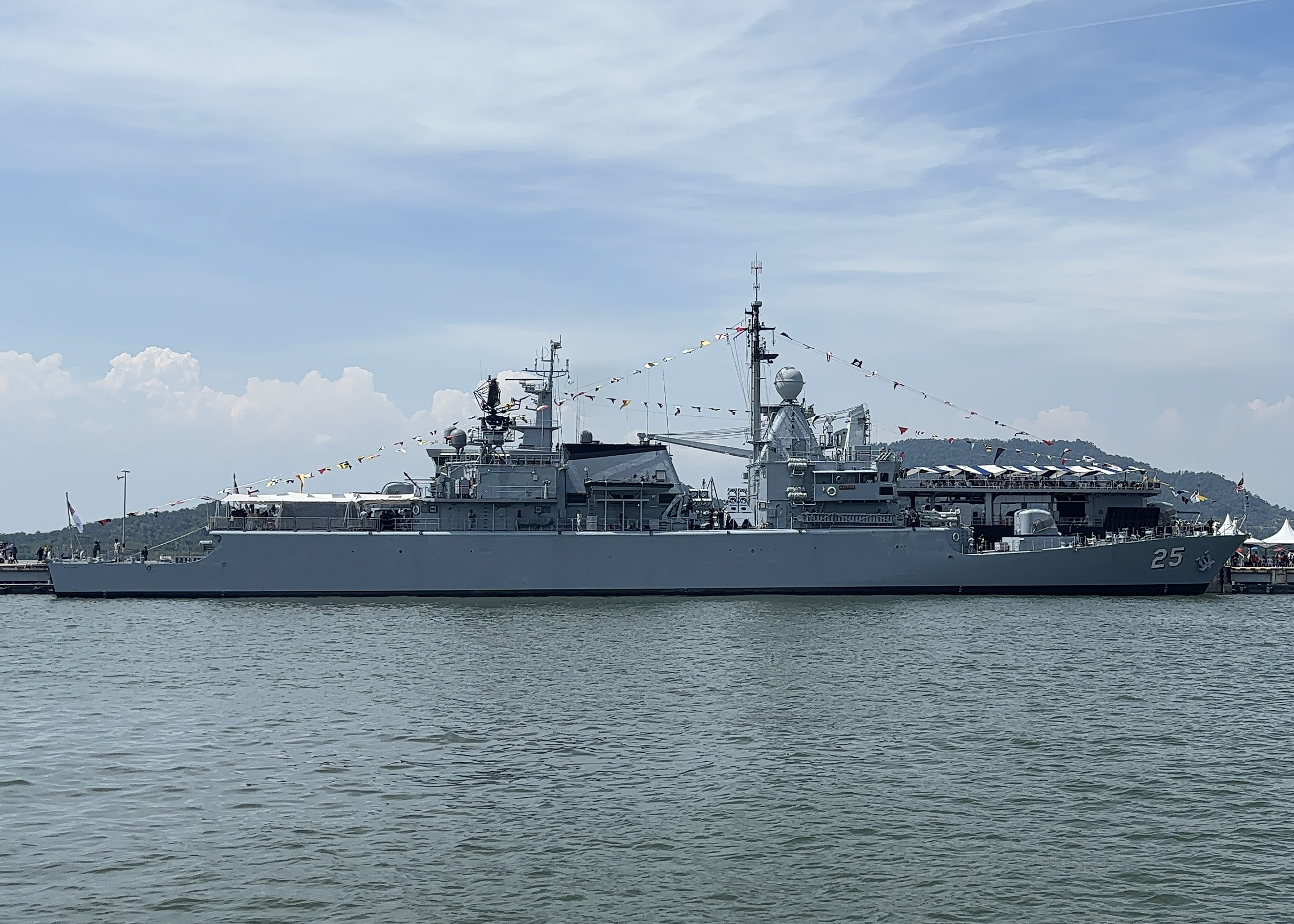
- KD Kasturi (F25) dressed overall while docking at Lumut Naval Base

History

Malaysia
- Name: KD Kasturi
- Builder: Howaldtswerke-Deutsche Werft
- Launched: May 1983
- Commissioned: August 1984
- Status: In active service
- Badge

General characteristics
- Class & type: Kasturi-class corvette
- Displacement: 1,850 long tons (1,880 t) full load
- Length: 98 m (321 ft 6 in)
- Beam: 11.5 m (37 ft 9 in)
- Draught: 3.5 m (11 ft 6 in)
- Propulsion: 4 × MTU 20V 1163 TB92 diesels; 23,460 bhp (17,490 kW); 2 shafts
- Speed: 28 knots (32 mph; 52 km/h)
- Range: 5,000 mi (8,000 km)
- Complement: 124
- Sensors & processing systems: TACTICOS Combat Management System; Thales Link Y Mk 2.5; DA-08 search radar; WM-22 fire control radar; DSQS-24C sonar
- Electronic warfare & decoys: DR3000S ESM suite; Scimitar jammers; SKWS decoys
- Armament: Guns: 1 × Bofors 57 mm gun; 2 × MSI DS30B 30 mm cannon; Anti-ship: 8 × Exocet MM40 Block 2; Anti-submarine: 2 × triple Eurotorp B515 with A244-S ASW torpedoes
- Aircraft carried: 1 × Super Lynx 300 helicopter
- Aviation facilities: Helicopter landing platform

KD Kasturi is the lead ship of Kasturi-class corvette of the Royal Malaysian Navy (RMN). She was acquired in the 1980s and served under 22nd Corvette Squadron of RMN and based in Lumut Perak. Kasturi is based on HDW's FS 1500 design.

== Construction and career ==
In 2009, Kasturi underwent an extensive modernisation known as Service Life Extension Program (SLEP) to enabling her to be employed for another 10 to 15 years. The SLEP program comprised extensive upgrade to the ship to aimed at both extending their service life and improving combat capabilities. The TACTICOS Combat Management System from Thales replaced the older Signaal SEWACO MA command system. The DR3000S Electronic Support Measures suite including the Therma SKWS Decoy Launching System was installed. In addition the DA-08 search radar and the WM22 fire control radar were overhauled and the Thales MIRADOR electro-optical sensor replaced the Signaal LIOD optronic director. For anti-submarine warfare, a DSQS-24C hull-mounted sonar from Atlas Elektronik was installed to complement the new torpedo-launch capabilities.

In 2021, KD Kasturi undergoing refit in Boustead Heavy Industries Corporation.
