= ROKS Yeosu =

Pohang-class corvette

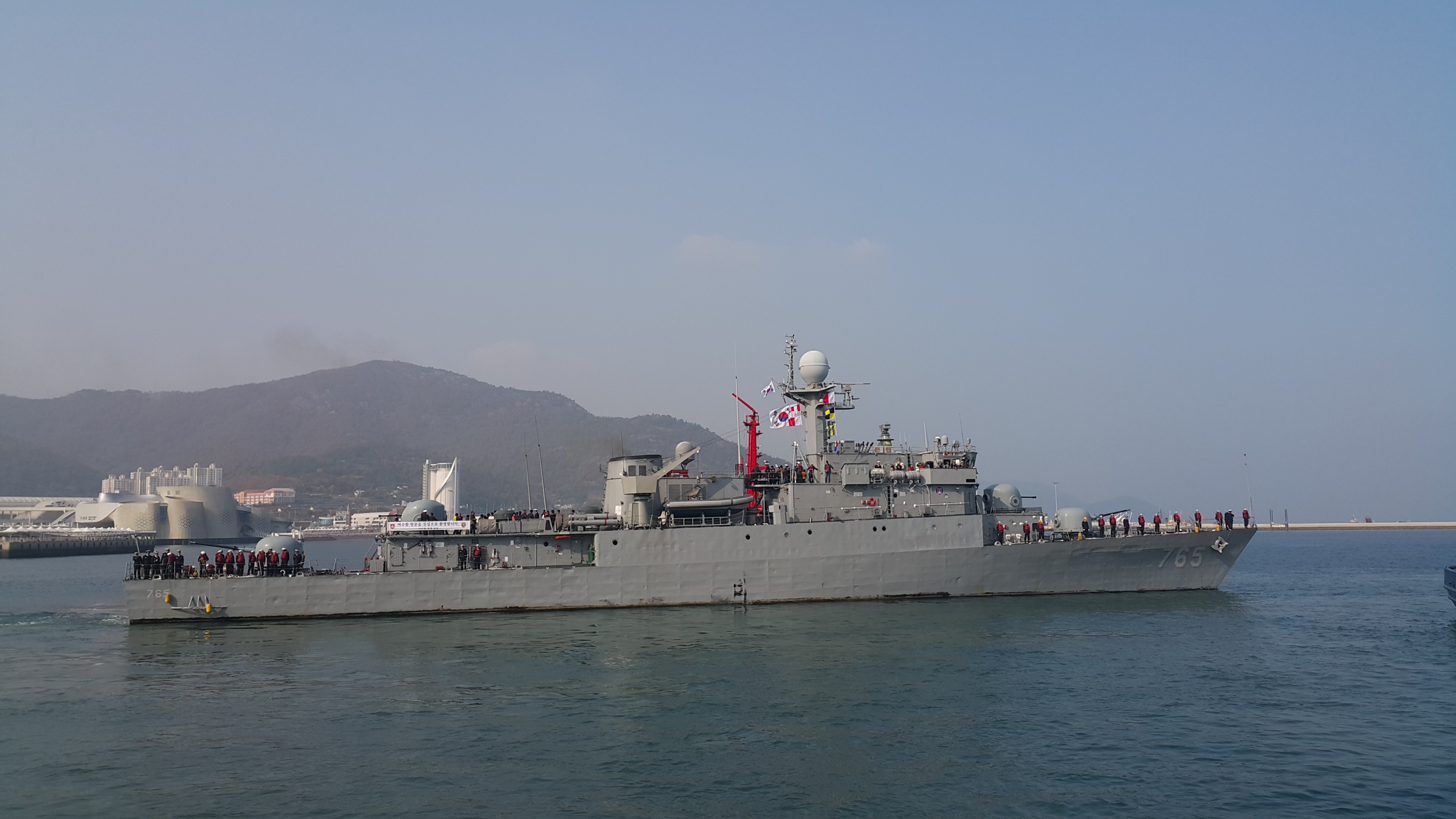
- ROKS Yeosu on 10 November 2015

History

South Korea
- Name: Yeosu; (여수)
- Namesake: Yeosu
- Builder: DSME, Geoje
- Launched: 14 June 1986
- Commissioned: 1 December 1986
- Decommissioned: 27 December 2017
- Identification: Pennant number: PCC-765
- Fate: Transferred to Vietnam People's Navy
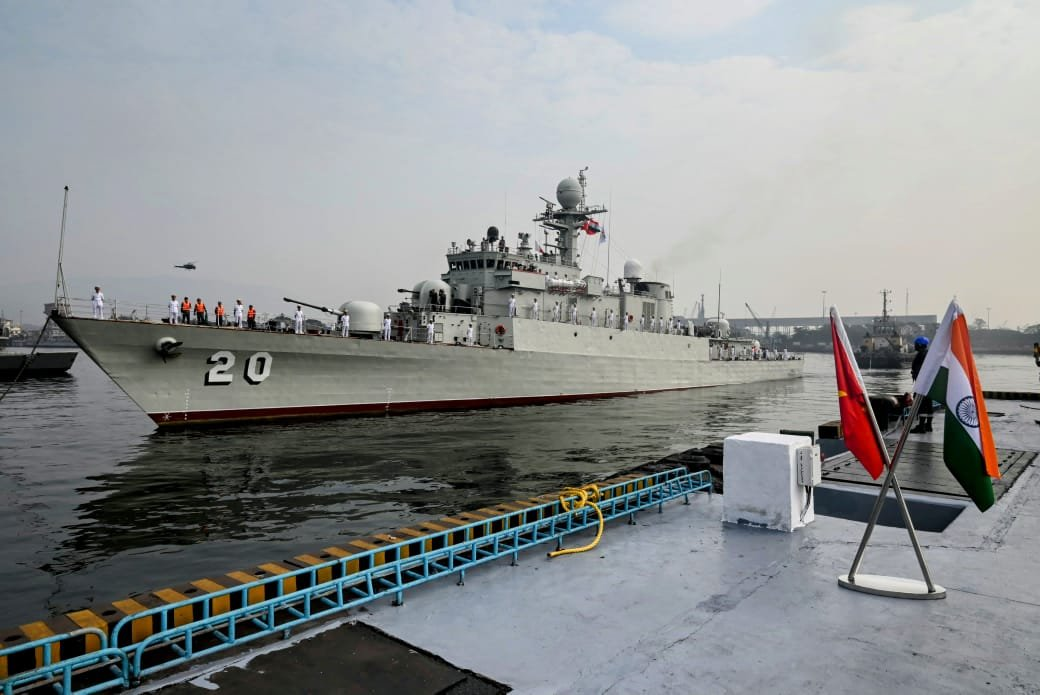
- Vietnam People's Navy Ship 20

Vietnam
- Name: Ship 20
- Acquired: 17 October 2018
- Commissioned: 17 October 2018
- Identification: Hull number: 20
- Status: Active

General characteristics
- Class & type: Pohang-class corvette
- Displacement: 1,220 tons
- Length: 289.7 ft (88 m)
- Beam: 10 m (33 ft)
- Draft: 2.9 ft (0.88 m)
- Installed power: 2 × MTU 6V396 TC52 diesel generators
- Propulsion: Combined diesel or gas (CODOG) arrangement: 2 × MTU 12V956 TB82 diesel engines producing combined total of 6,260 shp (4,670 kW); 1 × General Electric LM2500 PB gas turbines generating 27,820 shp (20,700 kW)
- Speed: 32 knots (59 km/h; 37 mph) maximum
- Range: 4,000 nmi (7,400 km; 4,600 mi) at 15 knots (28 km/h; 17 mph) using diesel engines
- Endurance: 20 days
- Boats & landing craft carried: 2 × RHIB
- Crew: 118
- Sensors & processing systems: X-band & S-band navigational radars; Raytheon AN/SPS-64(V)5B surface search radar; Signaal (Thales Nederland) WM-28 Fire Control System; Signaal (Thales Nederland) LIOD optronic director; Raytheon AN/SQS-58 hull mounted passive/active sonar
- Electronic warfare & decoys: 2 × Loral Hycor Mk 34 RBOC Chaff and Decoy Launching System
- Armament: 2 × Oto Melara 76 mm/62 caliber Compact naval guns; 2 × Otobreda 40 mm L/70 twin naval guns; 2 × quadruple launchers (2×4) VCM-01M cruise missiles; 2 × Mk 32 triple torpedo tubes; 2 × Mk 9 Depth charge racks; 6 × M2HB Browning .50 caliber machine guns

ROKS Yeosu (PCC-765) was a Pohang-class corvette of the Republic of Korea Navy and later transferred to Vietnam People's Navy as Ship 20.

== Development and design ==
The Pohang class is a series of corvettes built by different Korean shipbuilding companies. The class consists of 24 ships and some after decommissioning were sold or given to other countries. There are five different types of designs in the class from Flight II to Flight VI.

== Construction and career ==
Yeosu was launched on 14 June 1986 by DSME in Geoje. The vessel was commissioned on 1 December 1986 and decommissioned on 27 December 2017. She was transferred to the Vietnam People's Navy. She arrived on 17 October 2018 with a new name Ship 20.

During the South Korean International Fleet Review 2018 on 11 October 2018, Ship 20 sailed to South Korea with 13 other foreign country vessels.
