= KM Pekan =

Malaysian ship built in 2017

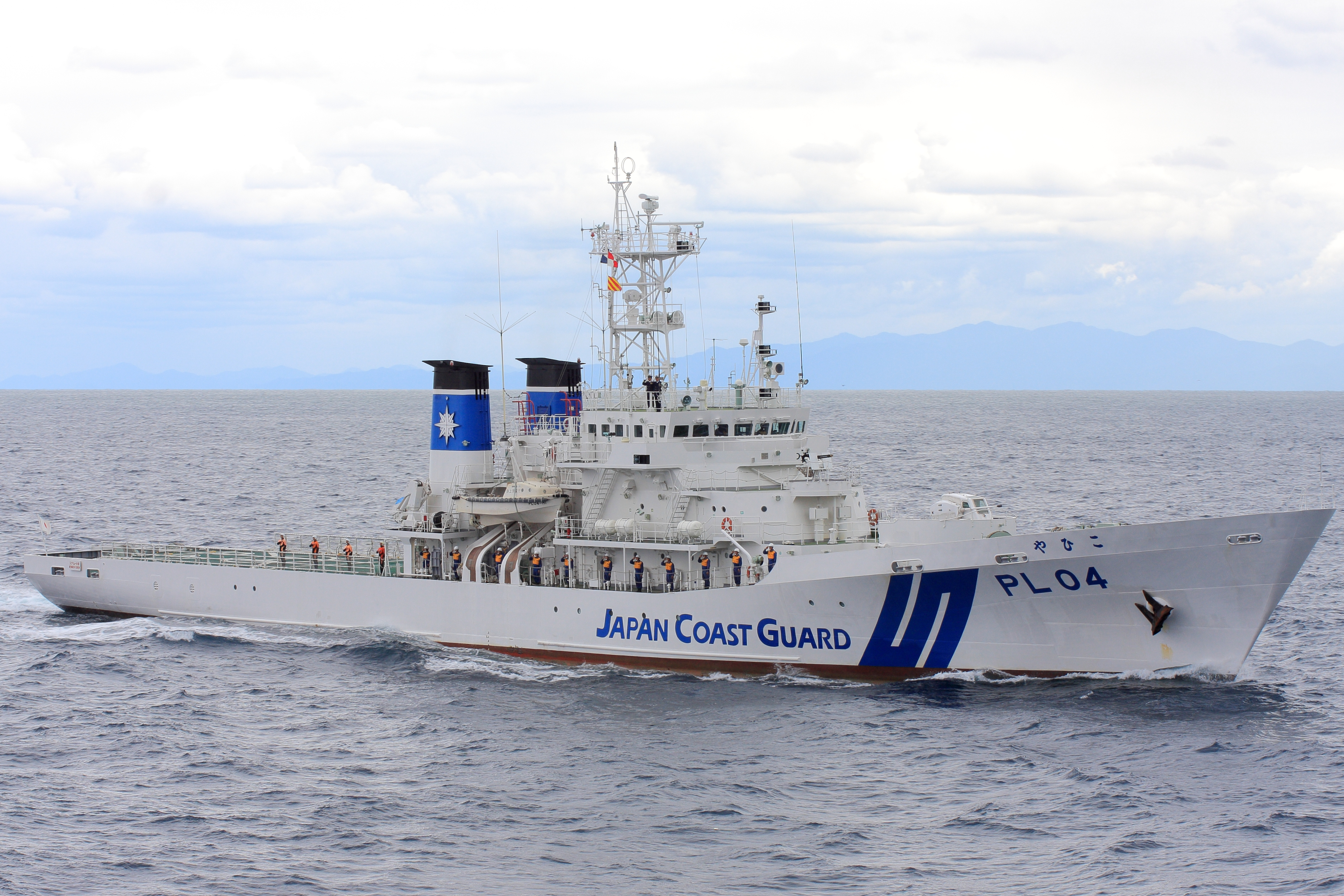
- Sister ship Yahiko

Class overview
- Name: KM Pekan
- Operators: Malaysian Maritime Enforcement Agency
- Active: 1

General characteristics
- Type: Offshore patrol vessel
- Displacement: 1,304 t (1,283 long tons) standard; 1,913 t (1,883 long tons)
- Length: 91.40 m (299 ft 10 in) oa; 87.00 m (285 ft 5 in) pp
- Beam: 11.00 m (36 ft 1 in)
- Draught: 3.50 m (11 ft 6 in)
- Propulsion: 2 × diesel engines
- Speed: 20 knots (37 km/h; 23 mph)
- Endurance: 30 days
- Complement: 50
- Armament: 2-4 × 12.7 mm general purpose machine guns
- Aircraft carried: Helipad for 1 x AgustaWestland AW139 or Eurocopter Dauphin

KM Pekan is an Ojika-class offshore patrol vessel operated by the Malaysian Coast Guard. This ship, together with KM Arau and KM Marlin was transferred from the Japan Coast Guard to Malaysia in order to strengthen the relations between the two countries. The ship was built as the Ojika for the Japanese Coast Guard in 1990–1991, but was renamed Erimo in 1999. In Malaysia service, it is the largest vessel in Malaysian Coast Guard.

== Description ==
The ship is 91.40 m (299 ft 10 in) long overall and 87.00 m (285 ft 5 in) between perpendiculars, with a beam of 11.00 m (36 ft 1 in) and a draught of 3.50 m (11 ft 6 in). Displacement was 1,304 t (1,283 long tons) normal and 1,913 t (1,883 long tons) full load.

This ship has a crew of 50 and endurance of 30 days. To fulfill the patrol duty, KM Pekan also has a helicopter deck to operate one medium-sized helicopter.

== Construction and career ==
The ship was ordered in November 1989 as the lead ship of her class of large patrol vessels for the Japanese Maritime Safety Agency. She was laid down by Mitsui at their Tamano shipyard on 28 September 1990, was launched with the name Ojika on 23 April 1991 and commissioned on 3 October 1991. The Marine Safety Agency was renamed the Japan Coast Guard in April 2000, and Ojika was renamed Erimo on 1 October 2000.
