= KLD Tunas Samudera =

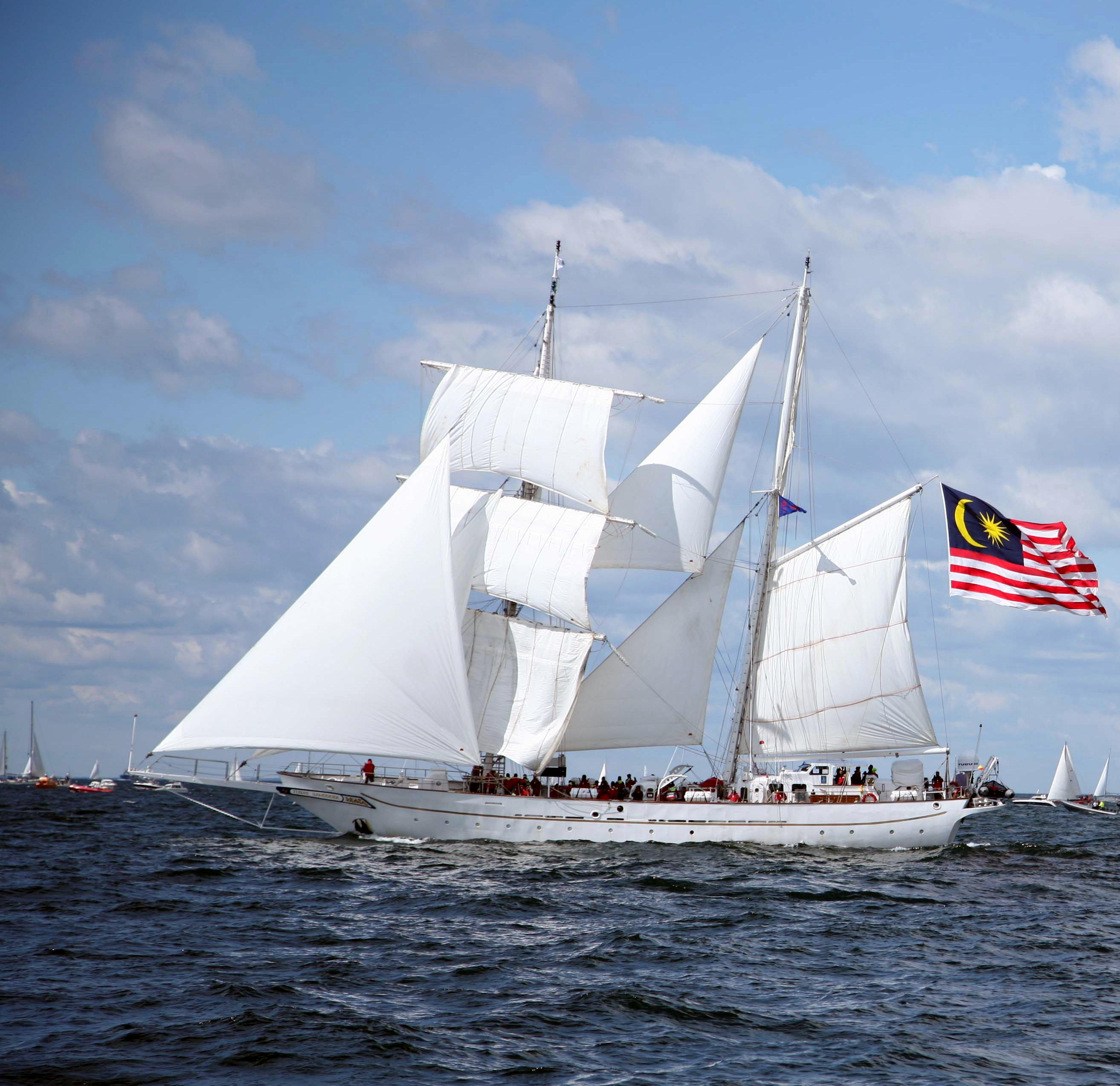

History

Malaysia
- Builder: Brooke Marine
- Laid down: 1988
- Launched: 1989
- Home port: Lumut, Perak
- Identification: MMSI number: 533962000; Callsign: 9MNT
- Badge

General characteristics
- Type: Sail training ship
- Length: 44 m (144 ft) LOA
- Beam: 7.8 m (26 ft)
- Height: 32 m (105 ft)
- Draft: 4 m (13 ft)
- Sail plan: Brigantine rig
- Crew: 46

KLD Tunas Samudera is a brigantine, of the Royal Malaysian Navy. Tunas Samudera was built by Brooke Yachts in Lowestoft, United Kingdom. She was laid down in 1988, launched in 1989, and christened by Queen Elizabeth II and the King of Malaysia. Tunas Samudera is a sail training ship with the Royal Malaysian Navy.

The vessel was designed by Colin Mudie of the Royal Designers for Industry, who was also responsible for sister ship Young Endeavour (operated by the Royal Australian Navy), and the sailing ships Tarangini (Indian Navy) and Lord Nelson.

She has participated in numerous Tall Ships' Races such as the Baltic Tall Ships Races from Switzerland to Poland during a 410-day circumnavigation of the globe covering 32,920 nautical miles with 25 ports of call between in 2007 and 2008, and is expected to participate in the United States Semiquincentennial festivities in New York.
