= KM Arau =

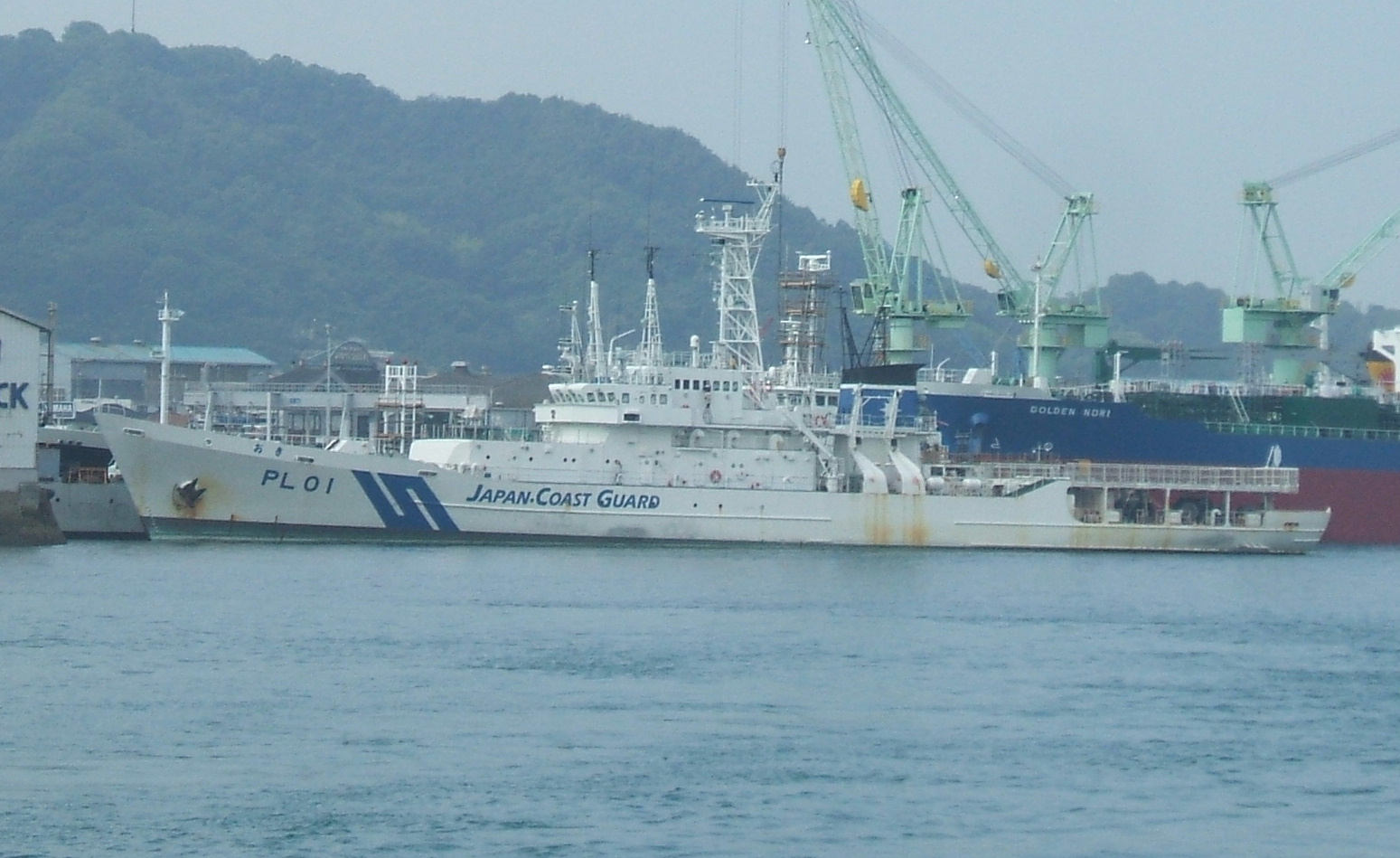
- Oki during Japan Coast Guard service

Class overview
- Name: KM Arau
- Operators: Malaysian Maritime Enforcement Agency
- Active: 1

General characteristics
- Type: Offshore patrol vessel
- Displacement: 993 tonnes
- Length: 87 m (285 ft 5 in)
- Beam: 10.5 m (34 ft 5 in)
- Draught: 5.5 m (18 ft 1 in)
- Propulsion: 2 × diesel engines
- Speed: 20 knots (37 km/h; 23 mph)
- Complement: 54
- Armament: 2-4 × 12.7 mm general purpose machine guns
- Aircraft carried: Helipad for 1 x AgustaWestland AW139 or Eurocopter Dauphin

KM Arau is an offshore patrol vessel operated by the Malaysian Coast Guard. She was the second ship transferred from the Japan Coast Guard together with KM Pekan and KM Marlin. KM Arau was formerly known as Oki (PL-01) in the Japan Coast Guard.

== Overview ==
KM Arau has a length of 87 metres (285 ft 5 in) and displaces 993 tons. The ship is crewed by a contingent of 54. KM Arau has a helicopter deck to operate one medium-sized helicopter.
