= Perdana-class missile boat =

Class of fast attack craft

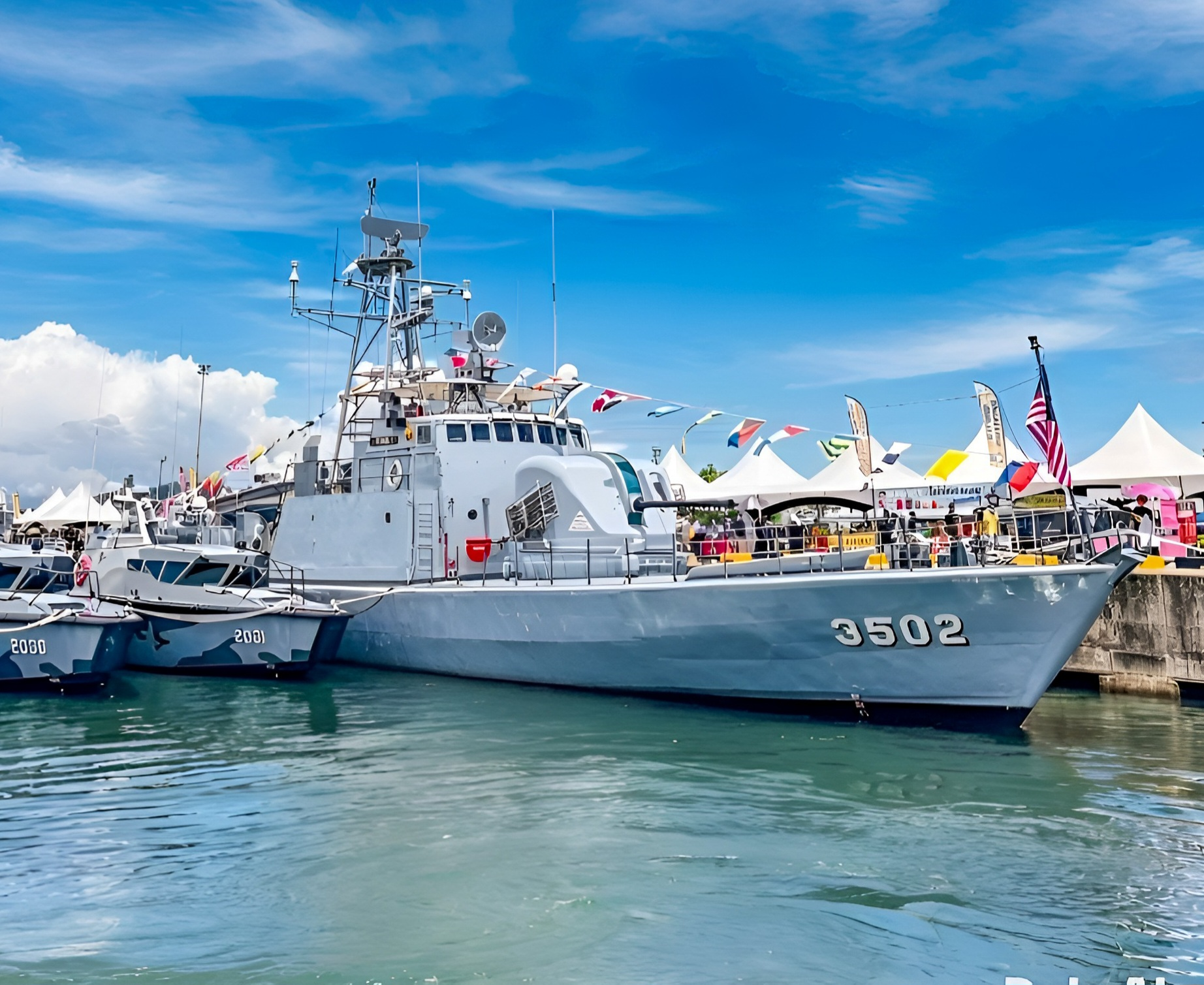
- KD Serang and combat boat in Royal Malaysian Navy open day

Class overview
- Name: Perdana class
- Builders: CMN/ Lürssen
- Operators: Royal Malaysian Navy
- In commission: 1972 – present
- Completed: 4
- Active: 4

General characteristics
- Type: Fast attack craft
- Displacement: 234 tons standard, 265 tons full load
- Length: 47 m (154 ft 2 in)
- Beam: 8 m (26 ft 3 in)
- Draught: 2.1 m (6 ft 11 in)
- Installed power: 4 × MTU MD 16V 538 TB90, 12,000 hp (8,900 kW)
- Propulsion: 4 shafts
- Speed: 36 knots (67 km/h; 41 mph)
- Range: 570 nmi (1,060 km; 660 mi) at 30 knots (56 km/h; 35 mph); 1,600 nmi (3,000 km; 1,800 mi) at 15 knots (28 km/h; 17 mph)
- Complement: 30
- Sensors & processing systems: Radar : Thomson-CSF Triton; G-band; Thomson-CSF Castor; I/J-band; CSEE Panda optical director; Combat system : AMOCS
- Electronic warfare & decoys: Thomson-CSF DR 2000S; ECM MEL Susie-1 with warning element
- Armament: Guns: 1 × Bofors 57 mm gun; 1 × Bofors 40 mm gun; Anti-ship: 4 × Exocet MM38 anti-ship missiles (removed)
- Notes: The missile might be removed due to being obsoletee

The Perdana class is a class of fast attack craft in service with the Royal Malaysian Navy. This class is based on the French La Combattante II design built by CMN/ Lürssen. A total of four ships completed and currently in service with Royal Malaysian Navy.

== Development ==
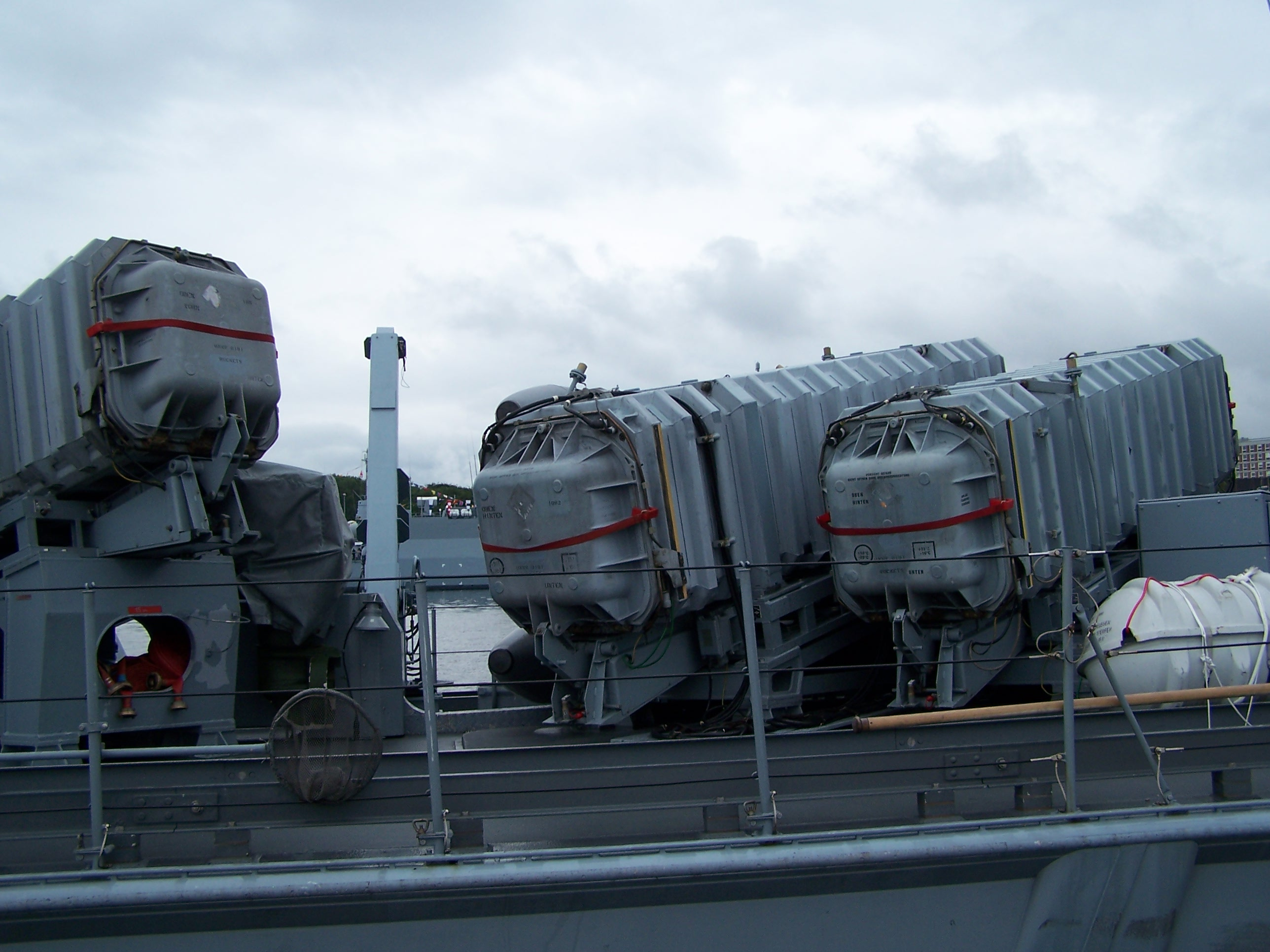
Exocet MM38 missiles

The Perdanas have a length of 47 metres (154 ft 2 in), a beam of 8 metres (26 ft 3 in), and a draught of 2.1 metres (6 ft 11 in). They have a displacement of 265 tons full load and the complement of 30. The armament consists of one Bofors 57 mm gun as the main gun and one Bofors 40 mm gun as the secondary gun. For anti-surface warfare they are armed with four Exocet MM38 missiles. She also completed with the sensors and processing systems, electronic warfare and decoys. In late 2020 the Royal Malaysian Navy confirmed that this class of ship will be upgraded to lengthen the service period of older ships.

== Ships of the class ==
Pennant number	Name	Commission Year
3501	KD Perdana	21 December 1972
3502	KD Serang	31 January 1973
3503	KD Ganas	28 February 1973
3504	KD Ganyang	28 March 1973
