= Pindad Maung =

Indonesian military light utility vehicle

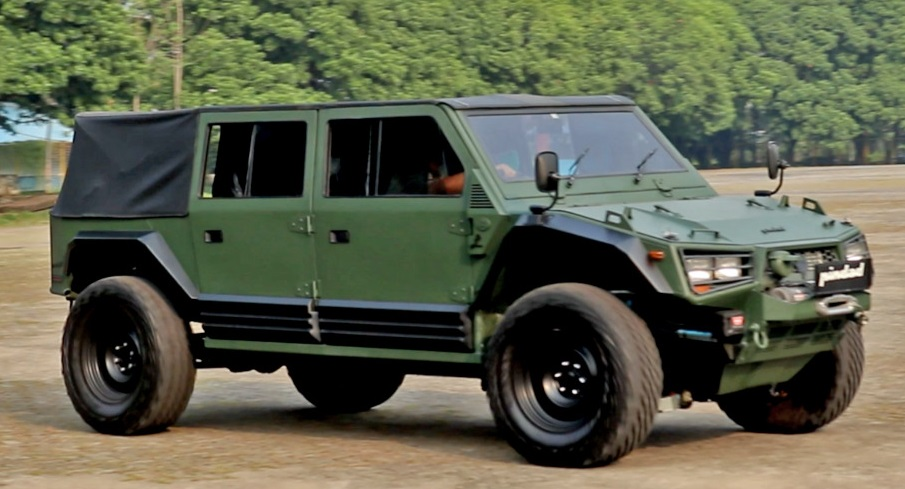
- Soft top variant of the Maung MV1
- Type: Military light utility vehicle
- Place of origin: Indonesia

Service history
- In service: 2021 – present

Production history
- Designer: PT MSA and FAD Works
- Manufacturer: Pindad
- Unit cost: 600 million rupiah (civilian) (42,820 USD in January 2021)
- Produced: 2020 – present

Specifications
- Mass: 2,510 kilograms (5,530 lb) (empty)
- Length: 4,835 mm (190.4 in)
- Width: 2,000 mm (78.7 in)
- Height: 1,890 mm (74.4 in)
- Main armament: 7.62 mm GPMG
- Engine: 2.4 L Toyota 2GD-FTV; 136 hp (138 PS; 101 kW)
- Transmission: Manual (6 forward and 1 reverse)
- Fuel capacity: 80 L (18 imp gal; 21 US gal)
- Operational range: 500 km (310 mi)
- Maximum speed: 120 kilometres per hour (75 mph)

The Pindad Maung is an all-terrain, all-wheel drive light vehicle produced by the Indonesian defense equipment company Pindad. Initially designed as a military light utility-type vehicle, civilian versions are also available. The name Maung means "tiger" in Sundanese.

== Description ==
The Maung is a light tactical all-wheel drive vehicle capable of carrying four personnel in its standard configuration. The vehicle has a four-door configuration (with removable doors), with a side-hinged tailgate onto which a spare wheel/tyre can be mounted. In standard configuration the vehicle is fitted with a removeable soft top. The front windscreen folds forward onto the bonnet.

Overall dimensions are given as 4.9 metres (16 ft) long, 2.4 metres (8 ft) wide and 1.8 metres (6 ft) high. Unladen weight does vary slightly by source but is between 2,160 and 2,270 kilograms (4,760 and 5,000 lb), with gross vehicle weight stated to be 2,910 kilograms (6,420 lb). Maximum road speed is 120 kilometres per hour (75 mph). Gradeability is 60%, side slope capability is 30%, and turning radius is 6.85 metres (22 ft) Fuel tank capacity is 80 litres (18 imp gal; 21 US gal), this giving a cruising range of up to 800 kilometres (497 mi).

The Maung is believed to be powered by a Toyota-sourced 2.4-litre 2GD-FTV four-cylinder turbocharged diesel engine, which develops 149 hp (151 PS; 111 kW) at 3,400 rpm and a maximum torque of 400 N⋅m (40.8 kg⋅m; 295 lb⋅ft) at 1600–2000 rpm. This is coupled to a 6-speed manual gearbox. Suspension is independent for the front axle, leaf springs for the rear. It has been suggested the chassis may be taken from the Toyota Hilux. For the civilian version, the engine may use Isuzu 2.5-litre engine like those used in Isuzu D-Max.

The third version of Maung was named by then Indonesian President Joko Widodo on 18 January 2023. This version has an empty weight of 2,510 kilograms (5,530 lb), 136-horsepower (138 PS; 101 kW) engine power, length of 4.835 mm (0.2 in), width of 2 metres (2,000.0 mm; 78.7 in; 6.6 ft), and a height of 1.89 metres (1,890.0 mm; 74.4 in; 6.2 ft). The interior of the vehicle was taken from Isuzu MU-X, but the engine used is the Toyota Hilux engine.

== Development ==
Development of the Pindad Maung traces back to 2018. At that time the name of the vehicle was Bima M-31, and the originator of the idea was the Commander of the Infantry Armament Center (Danpussenif) Surawahadi. Actual development was carried out by PT Pindad (Persero).

In 2020, then Minister of Defense Prabowo Subianto is understood to have contracted 500 units of the vehicle from PT Pindad. He stated the purchase of vehicles from Pindad was an effort to revive Indonesia's domestic industry. On Wednesday, 13 January 2021, Subianto officially handed over the first 40 units to the Army Chief of Staff, General Andika Perkasa. The handover was witnessed by the Indonesian Air Force Chief of Staff, the Indonesian Navy Chief of Staff, as well as high ranking TNI officials.

The Maung is offered in two versions, military and civilian. On 18 January 2023, the mass production version of Maung was introduced to the public, previously called Morino MV Cruiser at the Indodefence 2022 in November 2022. Morino stands for Motor Rekacipta Indonesia (lit. Indonesian-invented vehicle), but this name is no longer used after being given a new name by Joko Widodo.

== Variants ==
=== Maung MV1 ===
An ultra-light tactical vehicle designed to carry four personnel through extreme off-road conditions. With a maximum speed of 120 km/h, a cruising range of 600 km, a combat weight of 3 tonnes, and a personnel capacity of four, the vehicle has the following dimensions: 5.2 m (L) x 2.1 m (W) x 2 m (H). It boasts a power output of 184 HP and a torque of 420 Nm, and features an automatic transmission. This vehicle is suitable for operational and tactical purposes.

=== Maung MV2 ===
Maung MV2 has the configuration of 4×4 and dimensions (L×W×H): ±5.22 × 2.1 × 1.86 m. With 160 HP engine power at 3,200 rpm, torque: 385 Nm at 1,600-2,600 rpm, automatic transmission, maximum speed 120 km/hour, tour: ±1.000 km, climbing ability: 60%, personnel capacity: 4 people. It has additional features: serep tires, extreme terrain support system.

=== Maung MV3 ===
==== MV3 Tangguh (Spartan) ====
Designed for tactical operations, often doorless for maximum agility in rugged terrain.

==== MV3 Komando ====
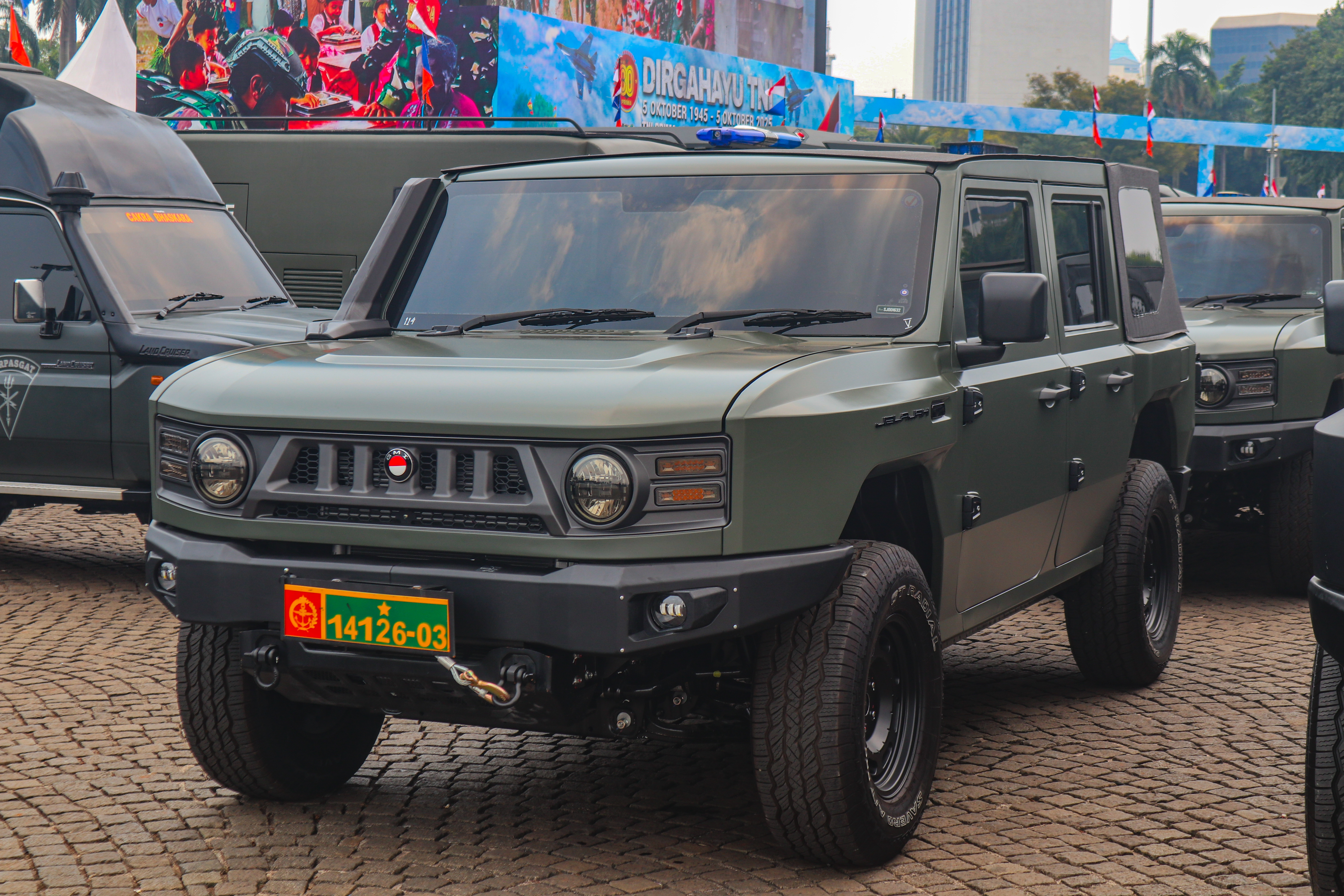
Maung MV3 Jelajah

Equipped with a hard top and full doors, suitable for covert tactical missions.

==== MV3 Jelajah ====
Using a soft top, designed for exploration or field operations.

==== MV3 Garuda (Limousine) ====
A special variant developed for official vehicles of ministers and high-ranking officials (Garuda) and the presidential vehicle (Garuda Limousine) with high security standards.

==== MV3 Tactical EV ====
The MV3 Tactical EV, named Pandu EV, is intended to support TNI operations with tactical capabilities powered by electric power (BEV - NMC battery). Using a 3-in-1 Permanent Magnet Synchronous Motor (PMS), the Pandu EV is capable of a safe speed of 100 km/h and has a range of up to 400 km. It was first introduced at the Indo Defence 2024 Expo & Forum on 11–14 June 2025, at JIExpo Kemayoran, Jakarta.

== User ==
- Indonesia: 5,500 units ordered, 40 units have been delivered to Indonesian Army. Several are ordered by Mobile Brigade Corps of Indonesian Police. As of May 2021, 100 units of the civilian version have been ordered.

== See also ==
- Pindad MV2
- P2 (armoured vehicle)
- Indonesian Light Strike Vehicle

== Similar vehicles ==
- Weststar GK-M1/M2, Malaysian military light vehicle
- Cendana Auto 4x4, Malaysian military light vehicle
- Humvee, US military light vehicle
- Dongfeng EQ2050, Chinese military vehicle
