= Pindad MV2 =

- Type: SUV, Military light utility vehicle
- Place of origin: Indonesia

Production history
- Designer: Pindad
- Manufacturer: Pindad
- Produced: 2021–present

Specifications
- Mass: 2,630 kilograms (5,800 lb) (empty); 3,200 kilograms (7,100 lb) (full)
- Length: 5,220 mm (205.5 in)
- Width: 2,010 mm (79.1 in)
- Height: 1,860 mm (73.2 in)
- Engine: 136 horsepower (101 kW)
- Transmission: Manual (6 forward dan 1 reverse)
- Suspension: Independent double wishbone (front), rigid coilover 4 link (rear)
- Ground clearance: 260 mm
- Operational range: 600 km
- Maximum speed: 120 kilometres per hour (75 mph)

The MV2 is an SUV / light military vehicle developed by the Indonesian defense equipment company Pindad. These vehicles are designed for a variety of uses, from military vehicles to civilian off-road vehicles. MV2 variants that will be developed include pickup trucks, and specialized variants that can be used for military operations.

== Specifications ==
The MV2 4×4 is equipped with a diesel engine with a power of 136 HP at 3,200 rpm and a maximum torque of 385 Nm at 1,600–2,600 rpm. The MV2 is a four-wheel drive (4WD) or 4×4 car with 35×12.50 R17 tires. The transmission used is a manual model with a total of 6 forward and 1 reverse acceleration. Front suspension is independent, double wishbone while the rear four-link with coilover shock. The empty weight of the vehicle is 2,630 kg and can withstand a maximum weight of up to 3,200 kg. The maximum speed is 120 km/h and it has a range of 600 km on a full tank. Ability to climb 60 percent, slope 30 percent, and ford 0.75 m.

Although at first this vehicle was mistaken for another version of the Maung, there are differences between the two. The MV2 is bigger and heavier than the Maung but uses a weaker engine than the Maung. His first prototype used a hard roof (except for the tailgate) unlike Maung which used a soft roof. The MV2's headlights already use LEDs, while the Maung's are halogen. The MV2 doesn't have metal grilles on the headlights like the Maung but has a footrest under the door, which the Maung doesn't have. MV2 is equipped with an LED light bar above the windshield.

== See also ==
- Pindad Maung
