= MMPV =

MMPV may refer to:

- Medium Mine Protected Vehicle
- Marine Multi-purpose Vehicle
