= Cendana Auto =

Malaysian military vehicle manufacturer

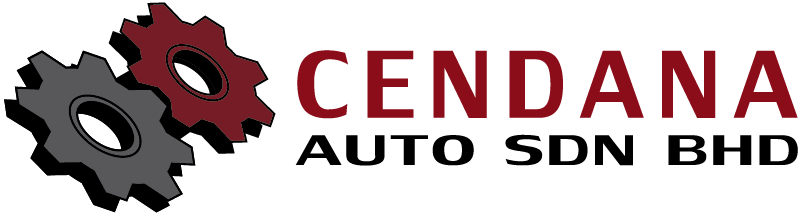
- Company type: Private Limited Company
- Industry: Automotive; Defence
- Founded: 2007
- Headquarters: Malaysia
- Products: Military vehicles Military/law enforcement equipment and maintenance
- Website: cendana-auto.com

Cendana Auto is a Malaysian company involved in the automotive and military vehicle industry. This includes the ability to design, repair and manufacturer civilian and military vehicles. The company was established in 2007 and based in Bandar Baru Bangi, Selangor and has a manufacturing plant in Semenyih, Selangor.

== History ==
Starting with the maintenance, repair and overhaul (MRO) of vehicles belonging to Government agencies, Cendana auto is now moving towards designing and building civilian and military vehicles after gaining experience from the MRO works. Its manufacturing plant has been established in Semenyih Selangor and the first contract to build military vehicles has been obtained from the Malaysian Government to supply over 200 Cendana Auto 4x4 tactical vehicles to the Malaysian army.

Through its success in supplying tactical vehicles to the Malaysian Army, Cendana Auto was entrusted to design and build special operation vehicle (SOV) according to the requirements and specifications outlined by the Malaysian Army. Under this program, the company came out with the Cendana Auto Magatti which is designed and built specially for Malaysian Army special operation force.

Cendana Auto also actively proposed an upgrade program for the Malaysian Armed Forces vehicles. This includes ACV-300 Adnan and K-200 KIFV. To enhanced their ability and trustworthy in this program, Cendana Auto has made a partnership with famous and reliable international defence companies such as Hanwha Aerospace.

== Products ==
- Cendana Auto 4x4
- Cendana Auto Magatti
- Cendana Auto Tornado (Starstreak SAM Carrier)
- Cendana Auto VEX-9 Multi Role Operation Vehicle / Special Operation Vehicle
- Cendana Auto GS Cargo
