= Weststar Defence Industries =

Malaysian defense contractor

Weststar Defence Industries Sdn Bhd
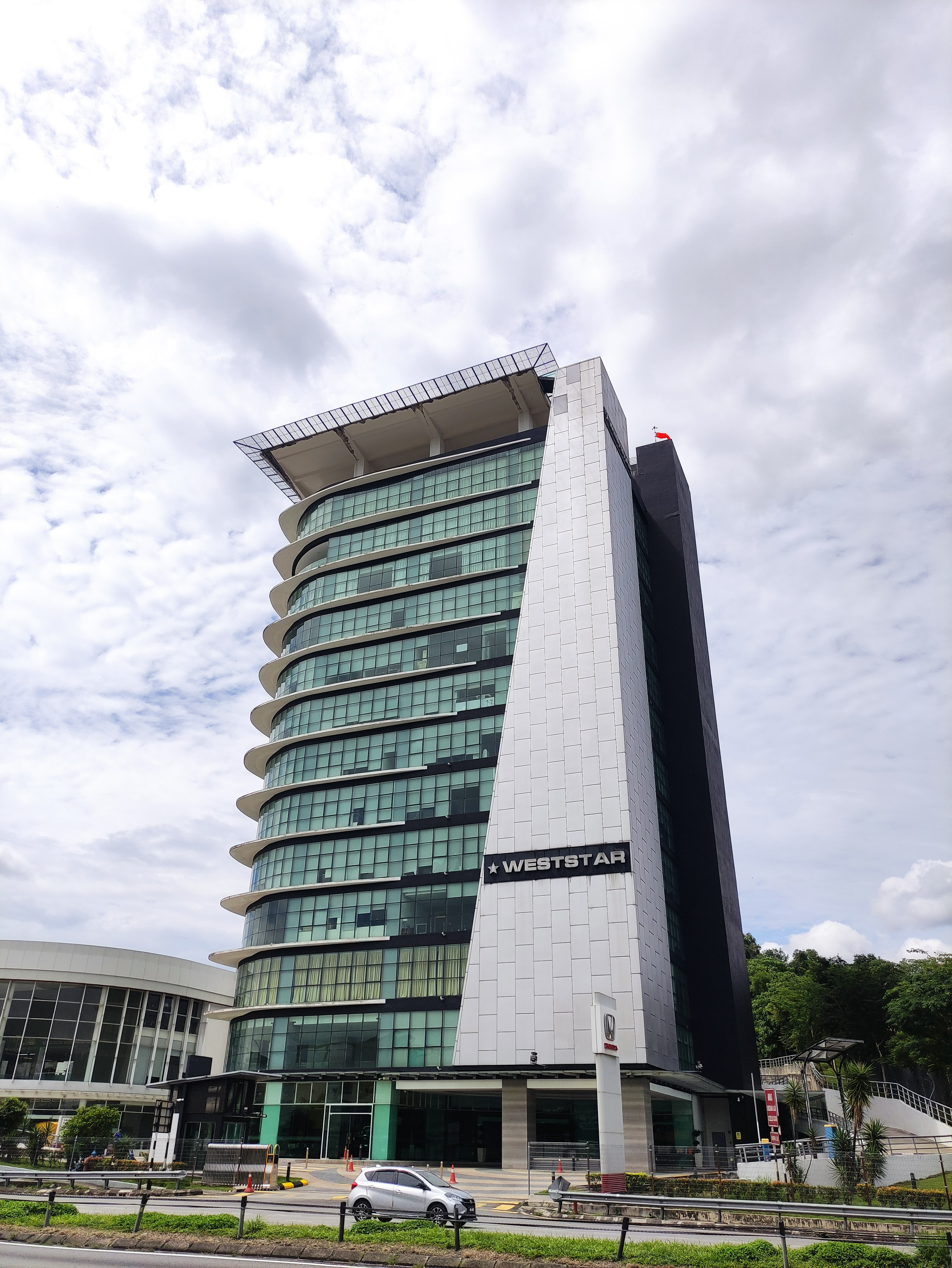
- Company type: Private Limited Company
- Industry: Automotive; Defence
- Founded: 2003
- Headquarters: Malaysia
- Area served: South East Asia
- Products: Military vehicles Military/law enforcement equipment and maintenance Industry/technology consultation
- Parent: Weststar Group
- Subsidiaries: Global Komited
- Website: Weststar Defence Industries; Weststar Global Komited

Weststar Defence Industries Sdn Bhd, also known as Weststar Defense, is a Malaysian defence contractor involved in the development, manufacture and distribution of military and law enforcement vehicles, as well as providing consultancy services.

Through its subsidiary Global Komited, it plays an important role in supplying military equipment to Malaysian Armed Forces.

== History ==
It was established in 2003 as a Ford vehicle dealership before it moved to the defense industry in 2007.

On 6 March 2012, the Malaysian Defense Ministry announced that Weststar would supply the Malaysian Armed Forces with the General Service (GS) cargo trucks. 11 GS cargo trucks were supplied in 2012.

On 16 April 2014, a contract was signed with Thales in order to promote various air defense systems to the Malaysian Armed Forces.

On 10 June 2014, Weststar was awarded a contract to supply the Timor Leste Defence Force with GS cargo trucks. 10 vehicles were to be delivered before the end of the year, and the company claimed that another 40 were to be ordered. The contract was priced at RM11 million (£2 million).

During the Defence & Security Exhibition 2015 convention, Thales which partnered with Weststar subsidiary, Global Komited announced that it had signed a contract to supply the Malaysian Armed Forces with ForceSHIELD to serve as its air defense system. This included Starstreak missiles, Ground Master 200 radar and weapon coordination systems, and Rapid Ranger and Rapid Rover mobile weapon systems.

On 20 April 2016, Weststar received a contract from the Malaysian Armed Forces to equip them with 44 Weststar GK-M1 Rapid Rover vehicles. An additional 44 were also expected to be ordered. They would be installed with the Starstreak very short-range air defence (VSHORAD) missile on a Lightweight Multiple Launcher (LML) system. Prototypes were tested after the contract was announced.

At the Defence Service Asia (DSA) 2016 exhibition, Weststar unveiled the Special Operations Vehicle (SOV) to visitors to showcase it to potential customers.

Weststar through its subsidiary, Global Komited has supplied Malaysian Armed Forces with 12 IAG Guardian in 2017.

In 2023, Weststar supplied Malaysian Armed Forces with CW-25D hybrid VTOL UAS completed with two truck mounted command and control vehicle.

At the Defence Service Asia (DSA) 2024, Weststar stated that they had delivered 50 an updated version of the vehicle called GK-M2 to the Malaysian Armed Forces while another 50 will be delivered in 2025 and another 50 in 2026. At the same exhibition also, Weststar announced that they had received a contract to supply four IAG Guardian to the Royal Malaysia Police.

== Products ==
- Weststar Maxus van
- Ambulance van
- Firefighting vehicle
- Weststar GS cargo pickup
- Weststar SOV
- Weststar GK-M1/M2
- IAG Guardian (partnered with International Armored Group)
- ForceSHIELD air defence system (partnered with Thales)
- CW-007, CW-15, CW-25 UAV/UAS (partnered with JOUAV)
