= CMC Cruiser =

Military light utility vehicle

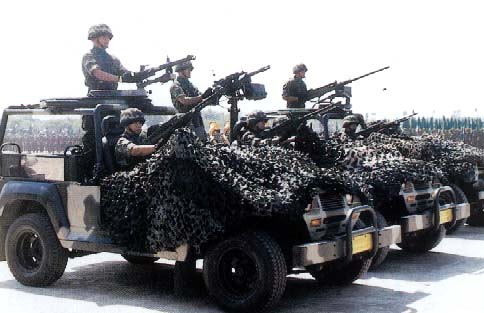
CMC Cruiser

The CMC Cruiser is a standard 1/4-ton military light utility vehicle that has been in use since 1990, formerly made by Columbia Motors Corp. The vehicle was introduced in the Philippines in the mid-90s and produced in unknown, but limited, numbers. It can carry 3 to 5 persons, and mounts two machine guns, of unknown type, one at the front and one at the back.
