= Indonesian Light Strike Vehicle =

Indonesian military light armored vehicle

ILSV
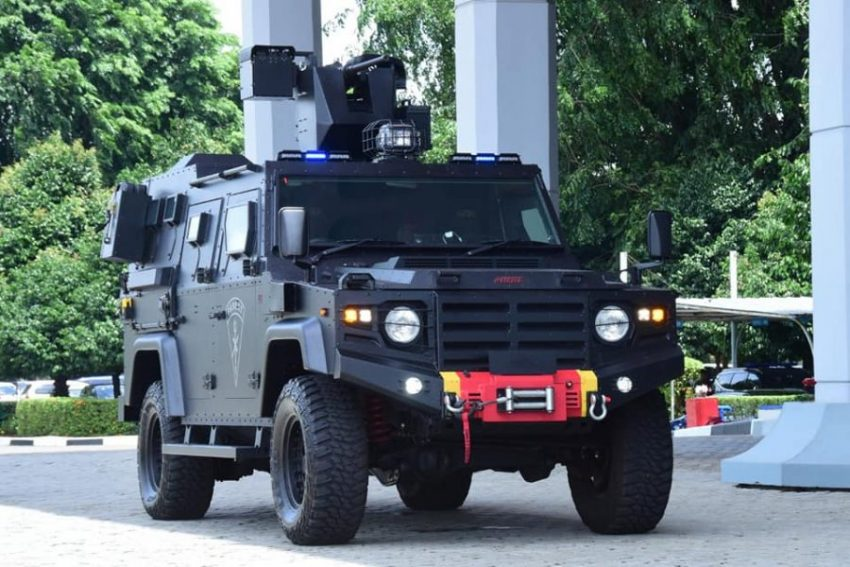
- An ILSV used by Korpaskhas.
- Type: Military light utility vehicle
- Place of origin: Indonesia

Service history
- In service: 2017–present
- Used by: Indonesia

Production history
- Designer: J-Forces and Indonesian Aerospace
- Designed: 2014
- Manufacturer: J-Forces
- Produced: 2014–present

Specifications
- Length: 5,420 mm (213.4 in) (soft top)
- Width: 1,925 mm (75.8 in) (soft top)
- Height: 2,070 mm (81.5 in) (soft top)
- Crew: 2+6 personnel (soft top)
- Armor: High strength steel and aluminium alloy of NIJ level III standard. NIJ level III bulletproof glass.
- Main armament: 7.62 mm machine gun
- Engine: Toyota 2KD-FTV 2.5 L turbodiesel I4 (J-Forces soft top and APC 2.5 Variants); Toyota 1FZ-FE 4.5 L diesel I6 (APC 4.5 variants); 149 metric horsepower (110 kW) (2KD); 212 metric horsepower (156 kW) (1FZ)
- Transmission: 5-speed automatic
- Ground clearance: 284 mm
- Operational range: 870 km (flat roads, 80km/h)
- Maximum speed: 120 kilometres per hour (75 mph)

The Indonesian Light Strike Vehicle (ILSV) is a family of light military vehicles produced by J-Forces, under PT Jala Berikat Nusantara Perkasa. This vehicle was first introduced at Indo Defense 2014.

== Design ==
The ILSV is basically a 4×4 multirole tactical vehicle built from the Toyota Hilux Generation VII chassis. Apart from the chassis, other components taken from the Toyota Hilux are the engine, drivetrain and legs. The legs are only changed as needed, especially in the shock absorber without a suspension lift kit.

With the adoption of engines from existing vehicles, it is considered to make it easier in terms of spare parts and maintenance. Although the chassis adopts existing vehicles, the ILSV is an ideal vehicle to support combat missions. The ILSV has a 5-speed manual transmission.

The chassis and body frame are welded together. The body construction is implanted by being welded without any body rubber and bolts that unite the chassis and body. Essentially this vehicle turned into a monocoque construction. The pillars that form the structure of this vehicle consist of hollow and seamless tubes. The weight of the soft top variant of ILSV is estimated at 3.5 tons.

== History ==
ILSV was first introduced at Indo Defense 2014 by PT Jala Berikat Nusantara Perkasa (PT Jala) and PT Dirgantara Indonesia (PT DI or Indonesian Aerospace—IAe). President Director of PT Jala Berikat Nusantara Perkasa Jhony Tanoto together with the manufacturing engineering team from PT Dirgantara Indonesia (PT DI) Udjang Hasan Subekti have high hopes that in the future Indonesia will be more independent in the defense industry. The type displayed in this exhibition is the soft top type.

ILSV was again displayed at Indo Defense 2016. This time, it featured a bullet-proof variant with NIJ level III standard steel. This variant was developed from the Toyota Hilux and can carry 6 additional passengers. A company representative said that the variant was made in response to demands for an ILSV vehicle with an armored cab.

In 2017, serial production of the GAG (Guerilla Anti Guerilla) variant for Mobile Brigade Corps started. The GAG version can carry 8 troops and equipped with 170 hp, 2,500 cc engine from Hilux with a weight of 4,644 kg.

In 2020 the IMLA (Indonesian Military Landworthiness Authority) of the Kemhan (Kementerian Pertahanan — Ministry of Defense) feasibility center carried out the rantis (kendaraan taktis — tactical vehicle) ILSV J-Forces 2400 cc feasibility certification and ILSV J-Forces Armored 2400 cc Kopaska in the framework of static testing and dynamic testing. The static test was carried out at the PT Jala Berikat Nusantara Perkasa production facility and the dynamic test was carried out for 1 day with a route from PT Jala Berikat Nusantara Perkasa (North Jakarta)–Andara toll road–Sentul City–Gunung Kapur Bogor, in the implementation of activities running smoothly and always comply with the COVID-19 health protocol.

Implementation of the dynamic test includes acceleration test materials from 40 km/h to 60 km/h, deceleration from 60 km/h to 40 km/h, safe speed up to 90 km/h, climbing power test 45%–60%, offroad test through the track (muddy, sandy, rocky, uphill, downhill, and flat road), test crossing parallel beam obstacles. In the implementation of both static and dynamic tests, malfunctions do not occur and are in accordance with the technical specifications in the contract.

== Variants ==
The ILSV consists of two variants:

- ILSV 2.5
- ILSV 4.5

== Users ==
- Indonesia: 24 used by Brimob. Also used by Kopaska and Marinir of TNI AL, and Paskhas. A 4-armored version for the Indonesian Army was delivered on 27 September 2021. More than of 70 units has been produced until 2020.

== Gallery ==
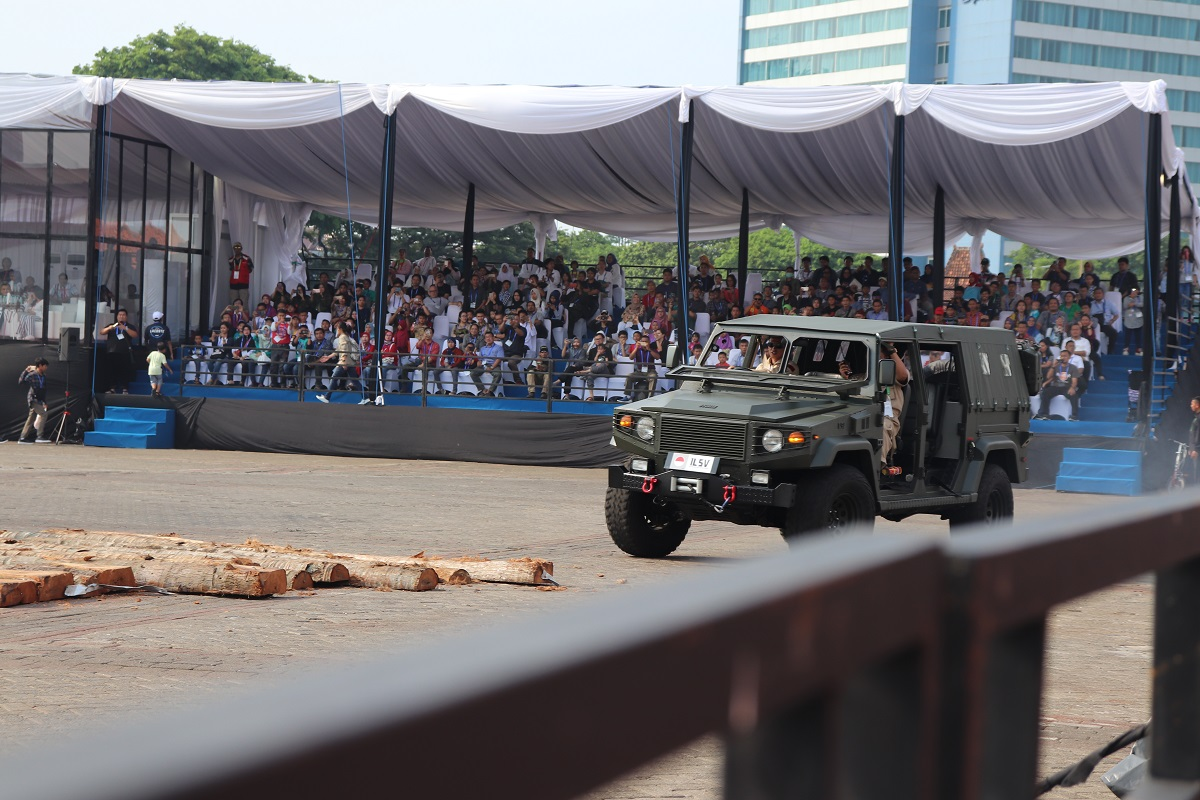
Soft top variant, at the closing of Indo Defence 2018.

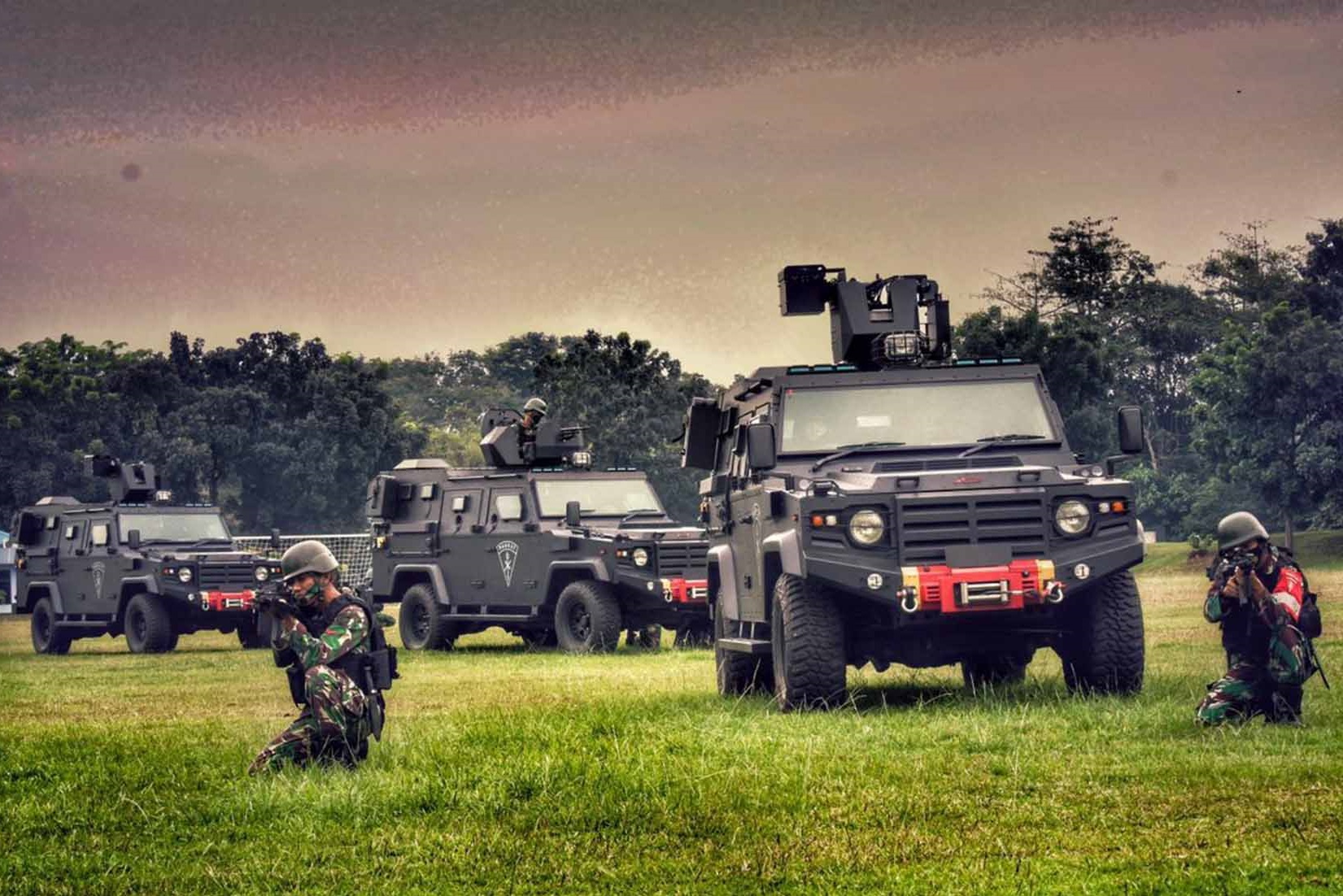
3 ILSV of Paskhas, 2 of them equipped with RCWS.

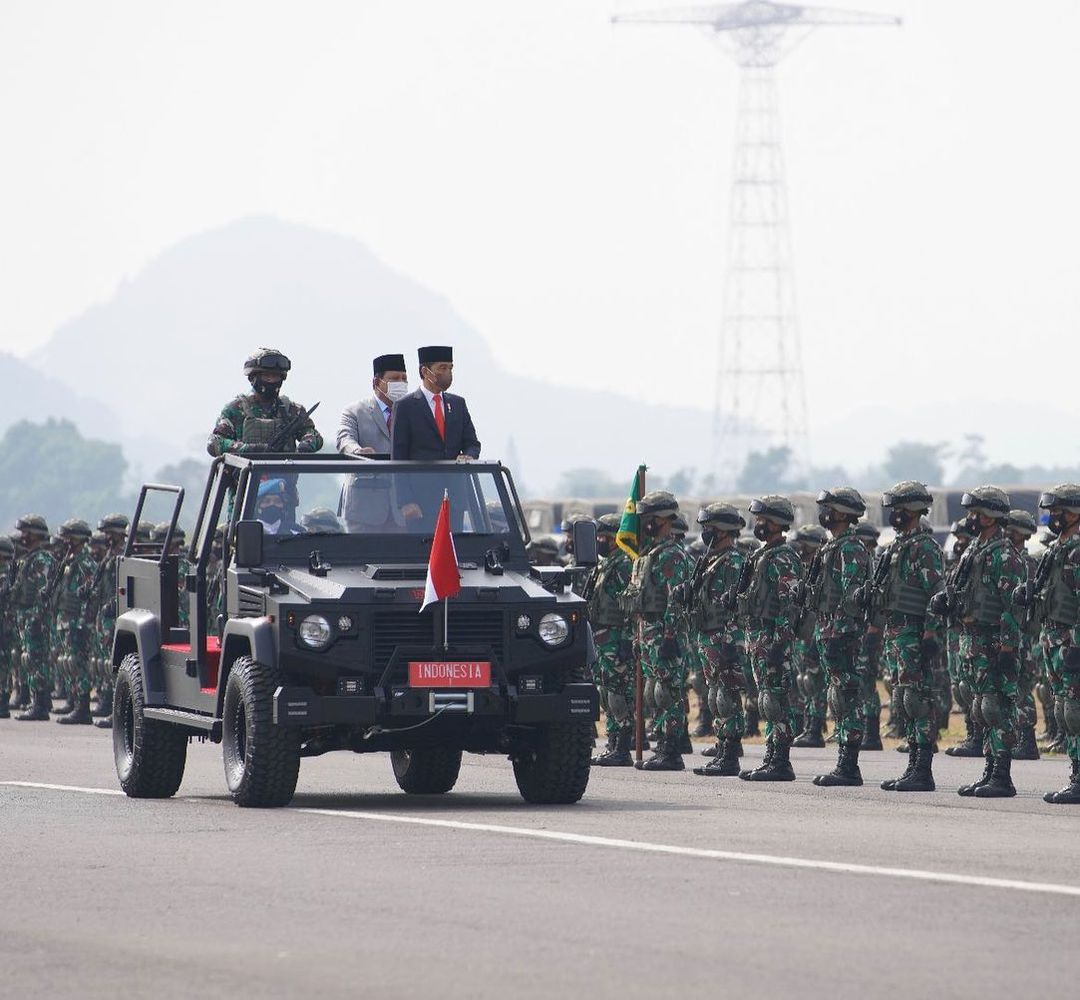
Jokowi and Prabowo inaugurates Komcad (reserve component) in ILSV panji-panji (banners) variant.

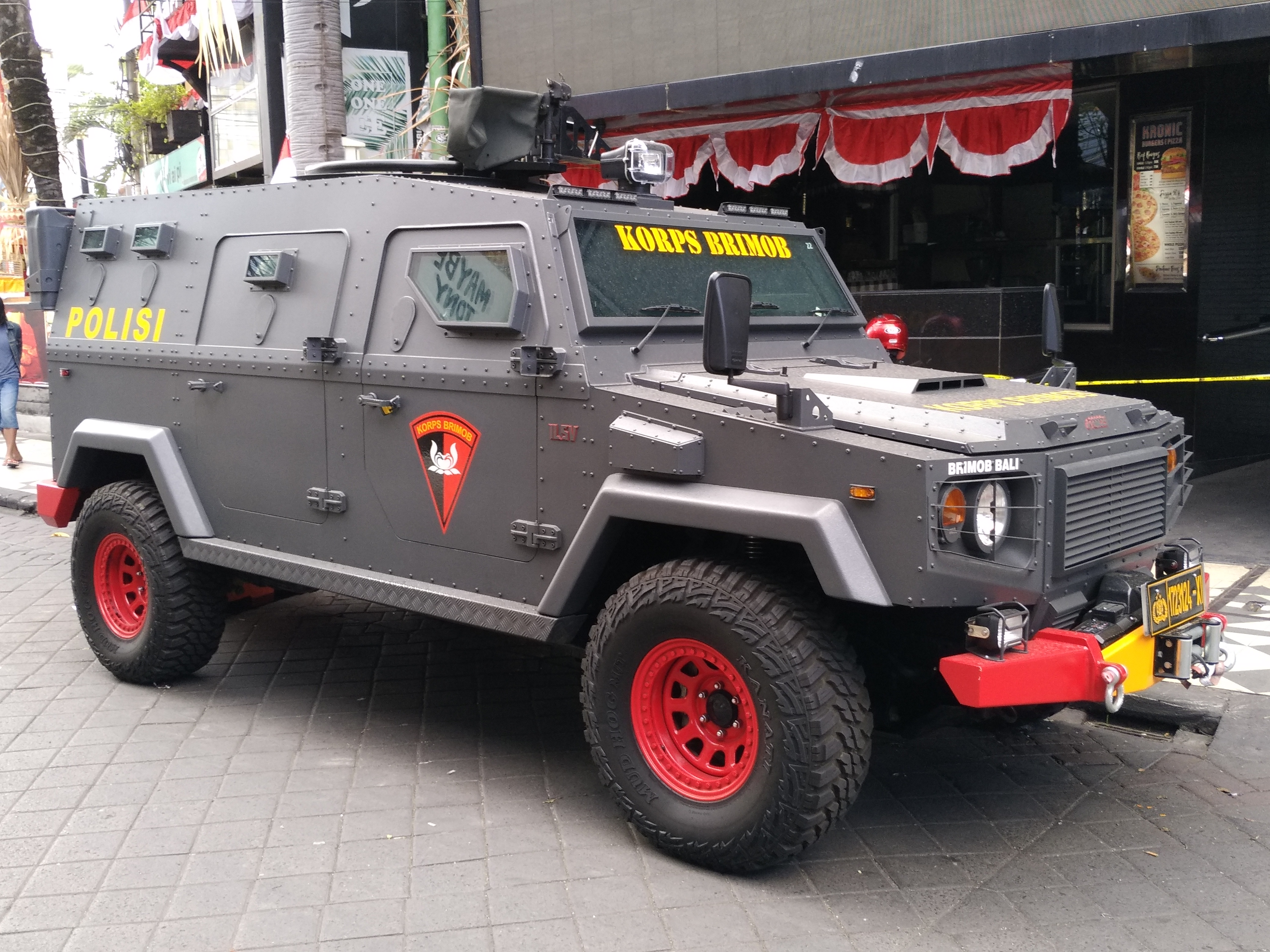
ILSV used by Police Mobile Brigade Corps (Brimob).

== See also ==
- Pindad Maung
- P6 ATAV
