= Cendana Auto Magatti =

Light assault vehicle or special operation vehicle

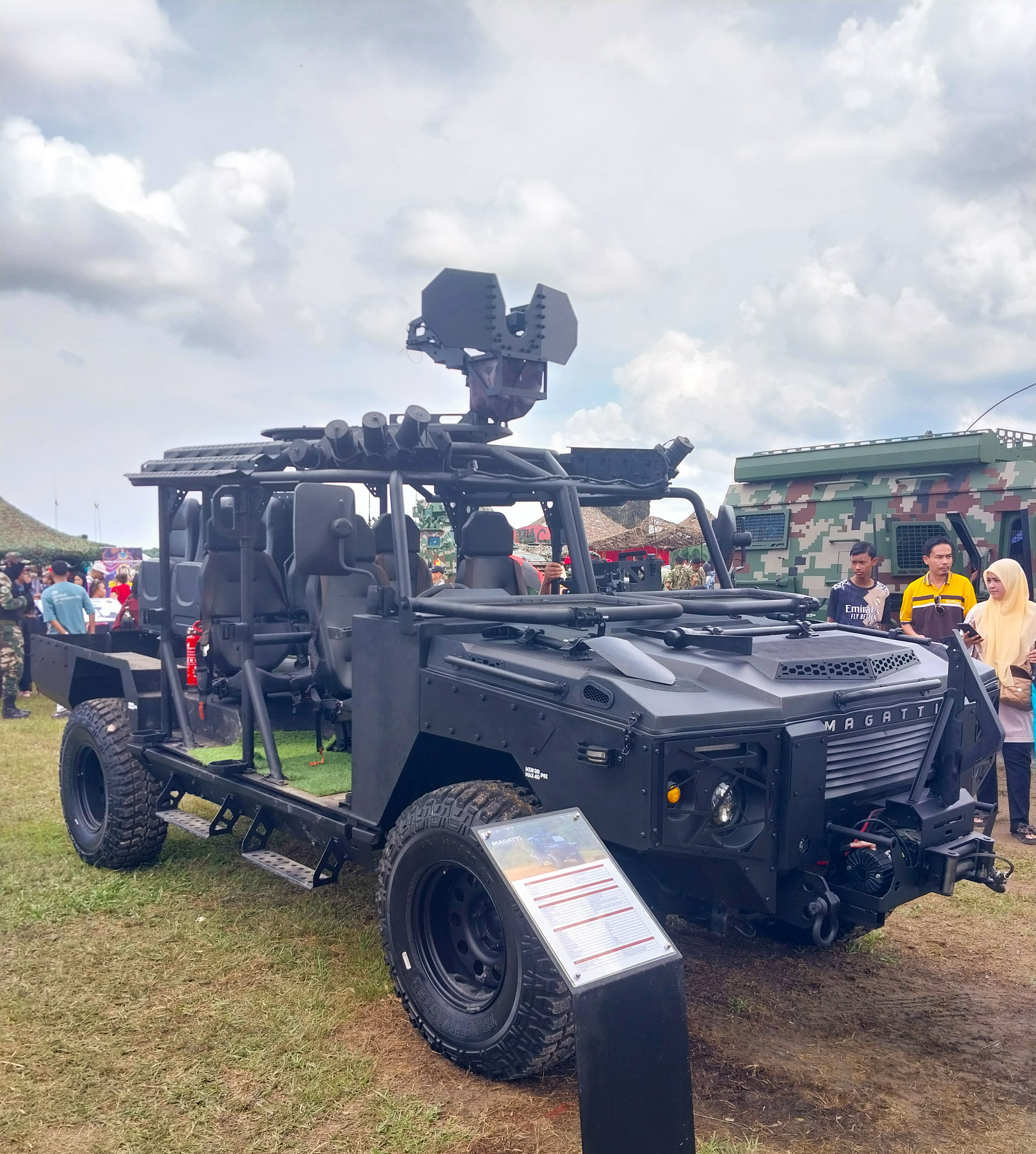
- Cendana Auto Magatti on display at MAF anniversary day
- Type: Light assault vehicle / Special operation vehicle
- Place of origin: Malaysia

Service history
- In service: Malaysia

Production history
- Designed: 2024
- Manufacturer: Cendana Auto

Specifications
- Mass: 4.86
- Length: 5.5 meters
- Width: 2.0 meters
- Height: 2.58 meters
- Main armament: 12.7 mm machine gun and/or grenade launcher
- Secondary armament: 7.62 mm machine gun
- Engine: 2.8 L Turbo Diesel; 204Hp / 3400 RPM
- Payload capacity: 12 crews
- Suspension: 4x4
- Operational range: 600 km
- Maximum speed: 100–150 km/h
- Steering system: Rack and Pinion Hydraulic Power Assist

The Cendana Auto Magatti is a light assault vehicle or special operation vehicle, which is an upgraded and improved version of the Cendana Auto Special Operation Vehicle or SF-21X. It was designed and produced by Malaysian defence company Cendana Auto.

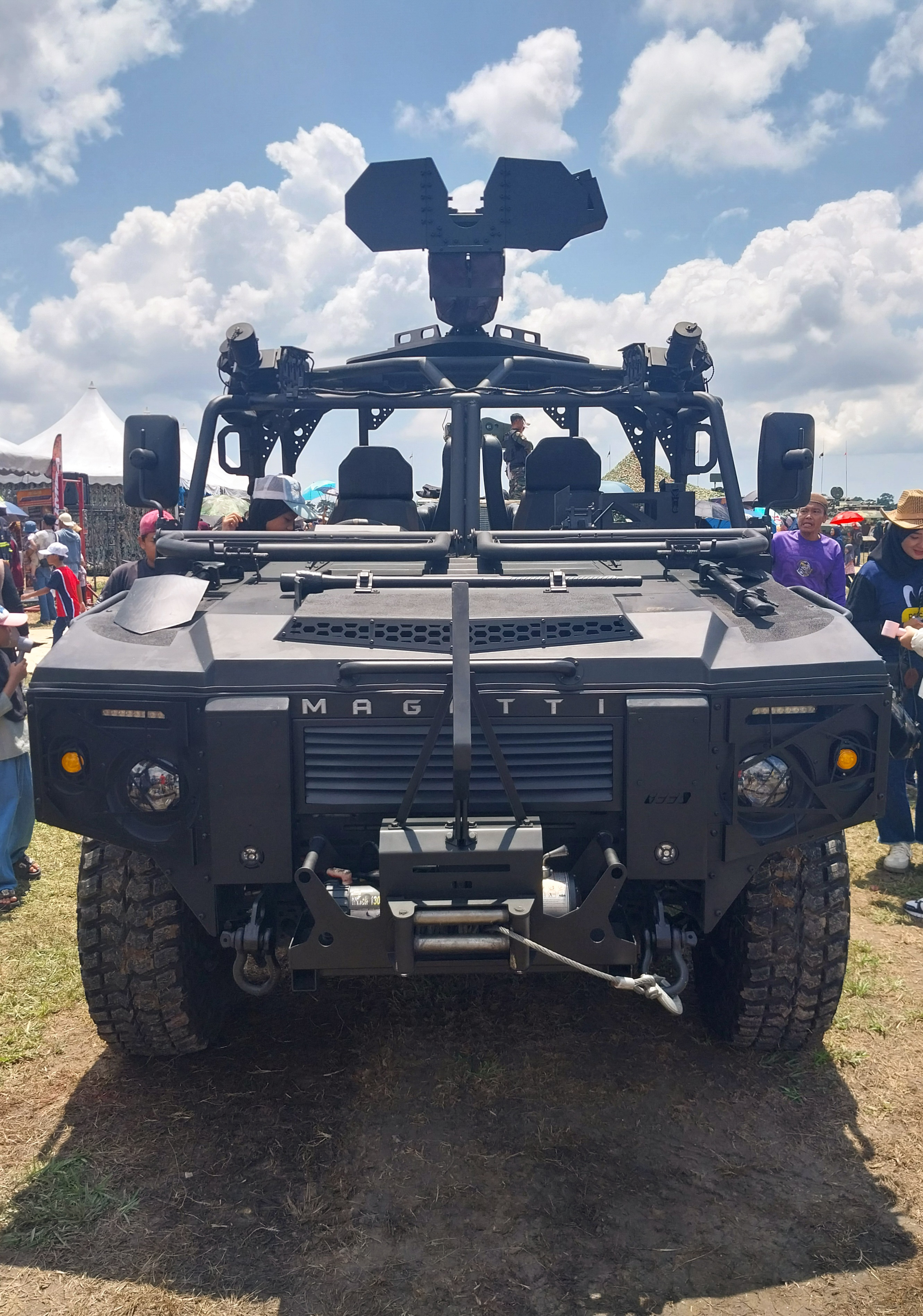
Front view of Magatti

The vehicle was launched in 2024. It was designed to carry up to 12 members including the driver, depending on the seating arrangement and combat load. It can be equipped with general-purpose machine gun and heavy machine gun, as well as heavier weapon such as automatic grenade launcher. 16 smoke grenade launchers also located at the top of the vehicle. Powered by 2.8 liter turbo diesel engine and with the power of 204 horsepower and 3400 revolutions per minute, it can speed up to 150 kilometer per hour and has a range of 600 kilometer.
