= Military light utility vehicle =

Small, light, all-terrain military vehicle

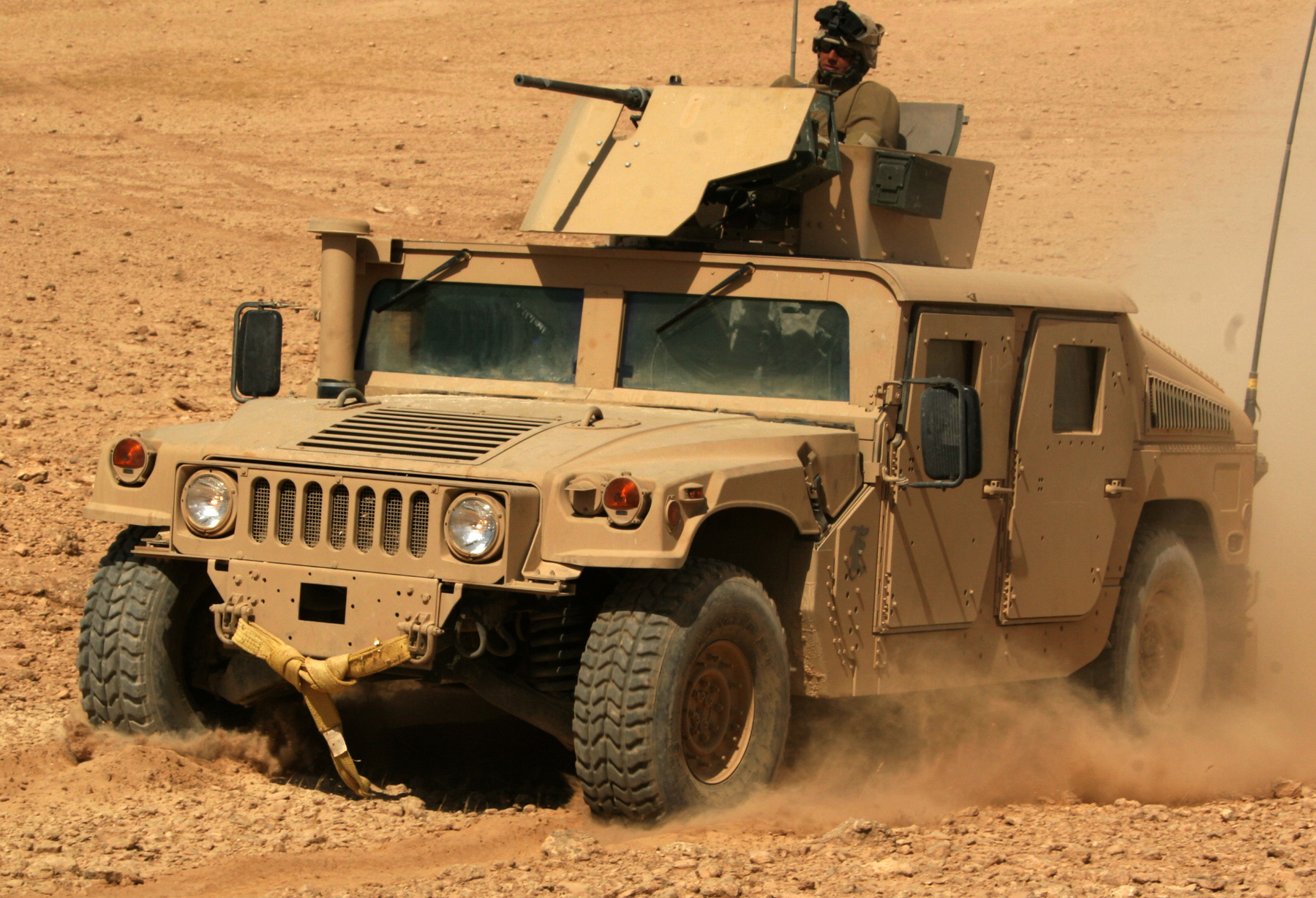
The Humvee has been the U.S. military's main light vehicle platform since the 1980s

Military light utility vehicle, or simply light utility vehicle (LUV), is a term used for the lightest weight class military vehicle category. These are generally Jeep-like four-wheel drive vehicles for military use that are by definition not armoured fighting vehicles, lighter than other military trucks and vehicles, inherently compact and usually with light or no vehicle armour and/or weapons, with short body overhangs for nimble all-terrain mobility, and frequently around four-to-nine passenger capacity.

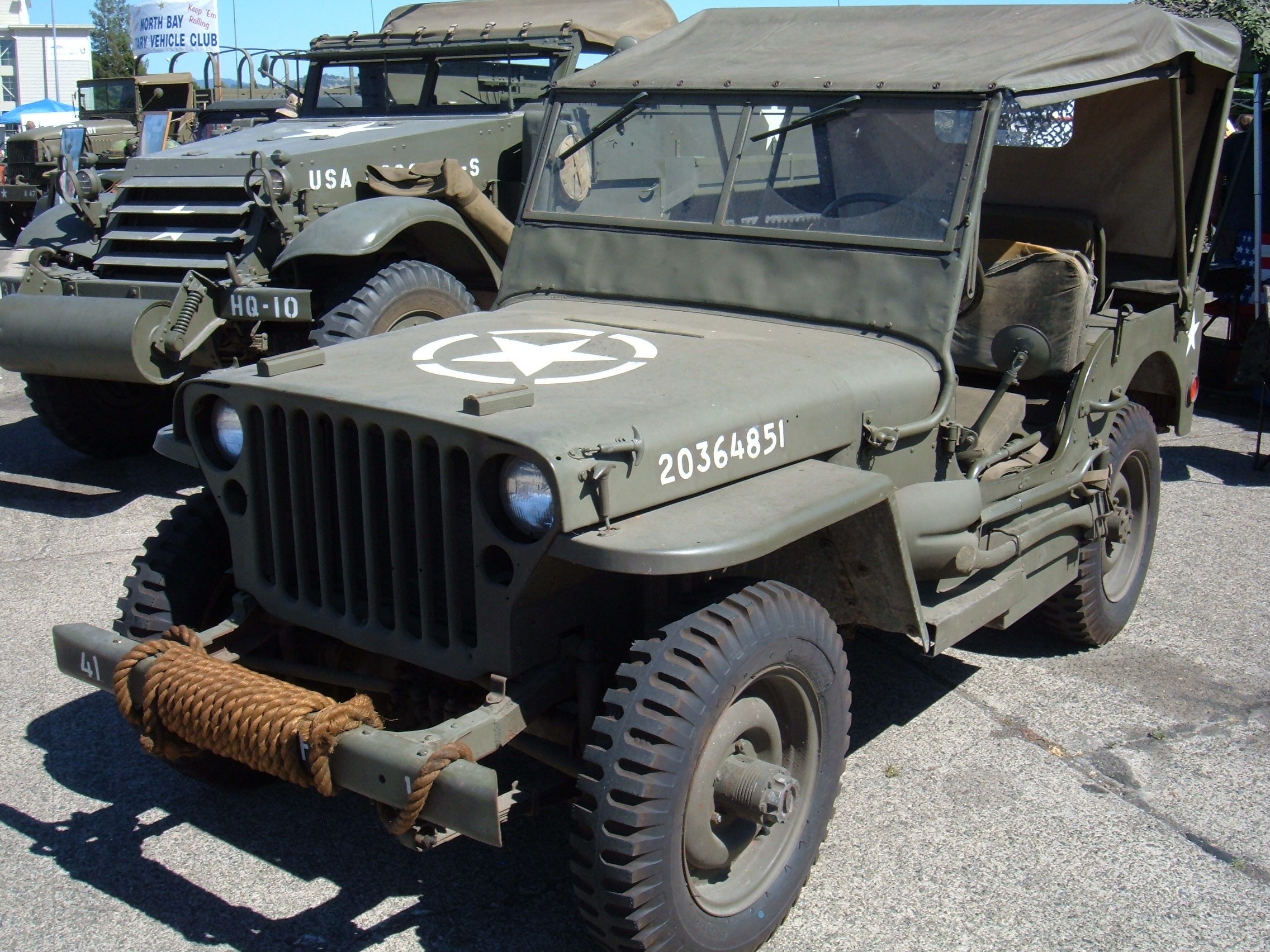
Since World War II, jeeps like this U.S. Army Willys MB became a staple of 20th century armies around the world, and an archetype of light military vehicles

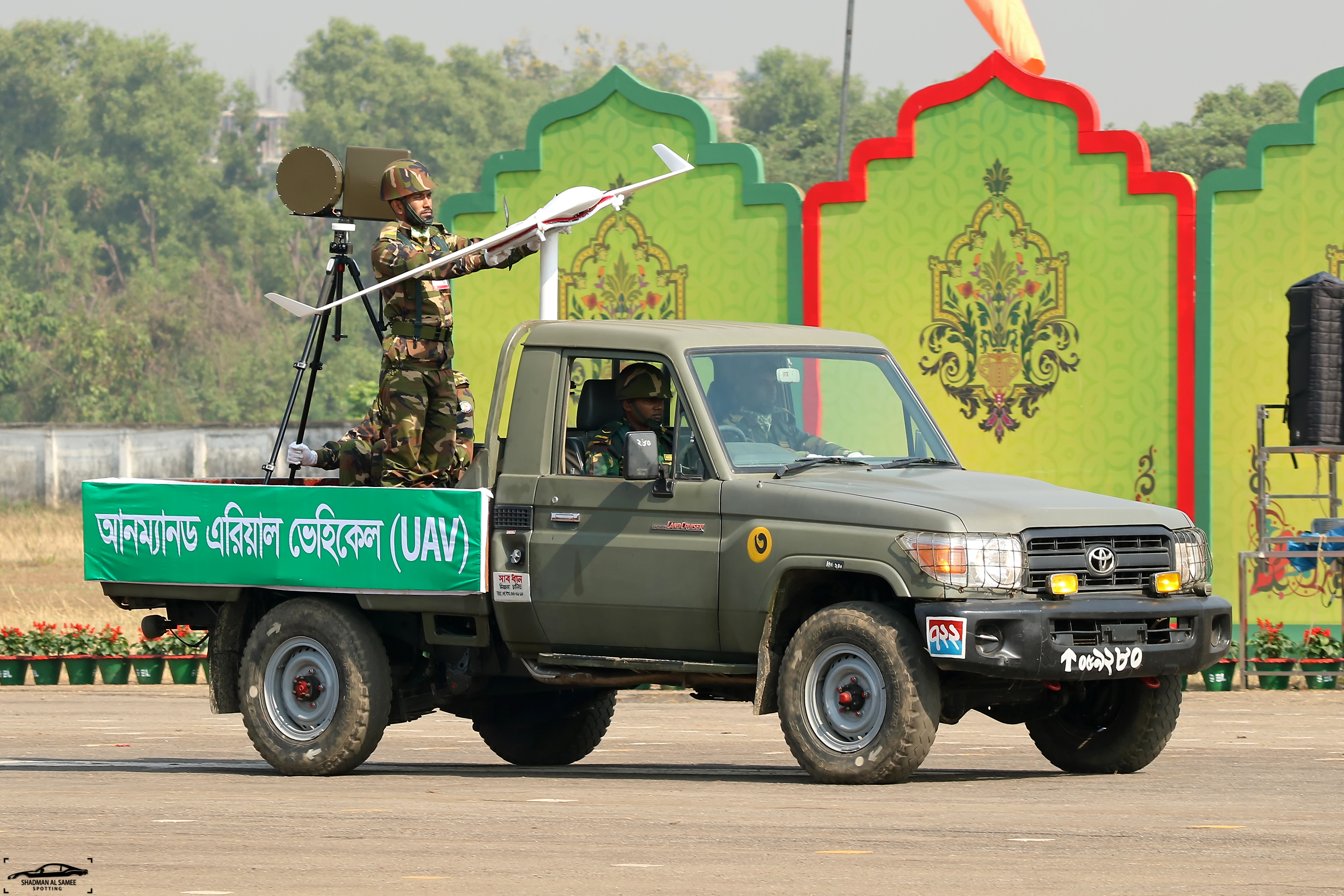
Bangladesh Army Toyota Land Cruiser 70 pickup with Bramor C4EYE UAV

Worldwide, and since the earliest large scale mechanisation of the military, hundreds of different light vehicles have been used for military utility service, ranging from readily available commercial products which were simply repainted in military colors, to purpose-designed tactical vehicles that were specially developed for military applications and operation in forward areas. Light utility vehicles are typically general or multi-purpose, used to carry troops, staff, (mounted) weapons, supplies, evacuate wounded soldiers, and many other diverse roles.

Military light utility vehicles originated in the first half of the twentieth century, when modernisation of armies meant replacing horses and other draft animals through mechanisation, as well as increasing mobility of the infantry, to gain an essential tactical advantage. In 21st century missions, small arms fire and improvised explosive devices (IEDs) continuously pose highly dangerous threats to mobile infantry, and the military's lightest utility vehicles have frequently become heavier and larger, as a result of addition of armour, for the purpose of crew protection. Designs for modern light military vehicle platforms have to balance manoeuvrability, speed, weapons capability, survivability and transportability – all of high importance to ground troops in operations.

Civilian adaptations of the Willys MB and Land Rover were the first sport utility vehicles, and some SUVs such as the Chevrolet Blazer have been used as military light utility vehicles.

The importance of this kind of military vehicle was summed up by General Eisenhower, who wrote that most senior officers regarded the jeep as one of the six most vital U.S. vehicles in World War II. (Note: The others being the bulldozer, the Landing Ship, Tank, the amphibious "Duck" truck, the 2½-ton 6×6 truck, and the C-47 airplane.) Moreover, general George Marshall called the jeep "America's greatest contribution to modern warfare." Similar vehicles are among the most common military vehicles in armies of most nations.

== World War II ==
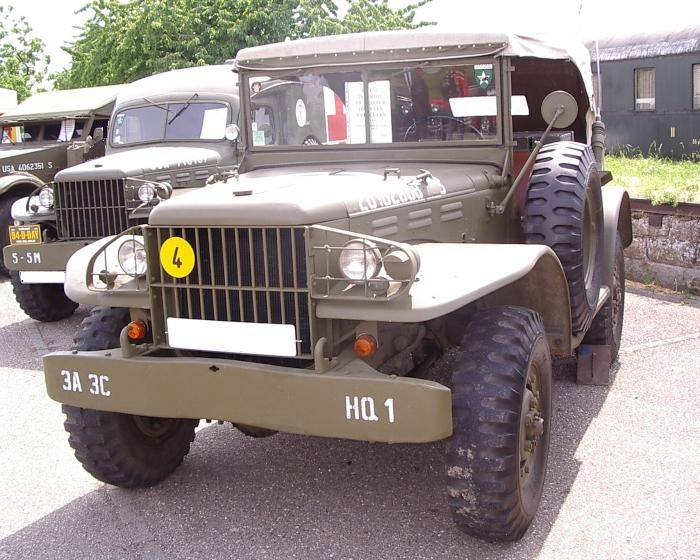
The Dodge WC series was built in some 50 variants. Shown here is a command / radio car with an ambulance behind it.

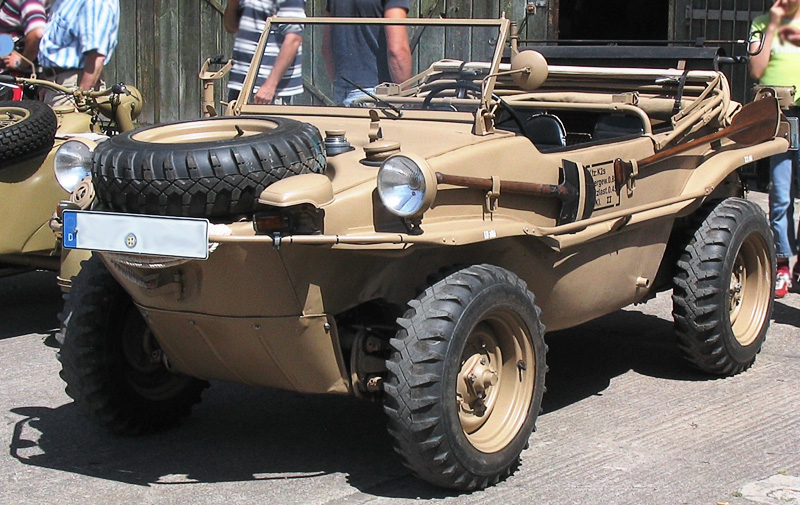
The Schwimmwagen, an amphibious vehicle used by the Wehrmacht

In 1939, the U.S. Army began standardizing its general-purpose trucks by limiting procurement to five chassis payload classes, from 1/2-ton to 7 1/2-ton, but the army was "to use commercial trucks with only a few modifications such as brush guards and towing pintles .." However, in 1940 the categories were revised. A new, lightest chassis, "quarter-ton" class was introduced, at the bottom of the range, and the 1/2-ton category was supplanted by a 3/4-ton chassis – both were classified as "light" trucks; 1 1/2-tonners were considered "medium".

The Willys MB Jeep of World War II used by the U.S. Army is probably the most widely known vehicle of this class. Over 640,000 Jeeps were built for World War II, and they inspired many vehicles similar in layout, or function. Besides the jeep, the U.S. also produced some 330,000 half- and three quarter-ton Dodge WC series trucks, in a wide range of variants. Together, the Willys and Ford jeeps, and Dodge's WC-series trucks made up nearly all of the WW II U.S. light vehicle output of almost a million (~988,000) units.

In World War II, Germany used the Volkswagen Kübelwagen for a similar role. It only had rear-wheel drive, but could take advantage of light weight, a very flat, smooth underbody, rear axle portal geared hubs, and a rear-mounted engine for mobility. Early American dune buggies were also based on the Volkswagen, and the Desert Storm-era Desert Patrol Vehicle evolved from the dune buggy configuration for combat use.

The Volkswagen Schwimmwagen featured a bathtub-like unitary boat-body and propulsion screw. The Jeep was similarly adapted as the Ford GPA "Seep", but was never as successful as the Schwimmwagen, which became the most mass-produced amphibious car in history. Unlike the Kübelwagen, the Schwimmwagen was equipped with four-wheel drive, and with its super-smooth underbody and portal geared hubs front and rear, arguably the most capable light German off-roader in World War II.

The Soviet Union produced the GAZ-64 based largely on the US jeep design, succeeded by the GAZ-67 and GAZ-67B, until ca. 1953.

== Post-war ==
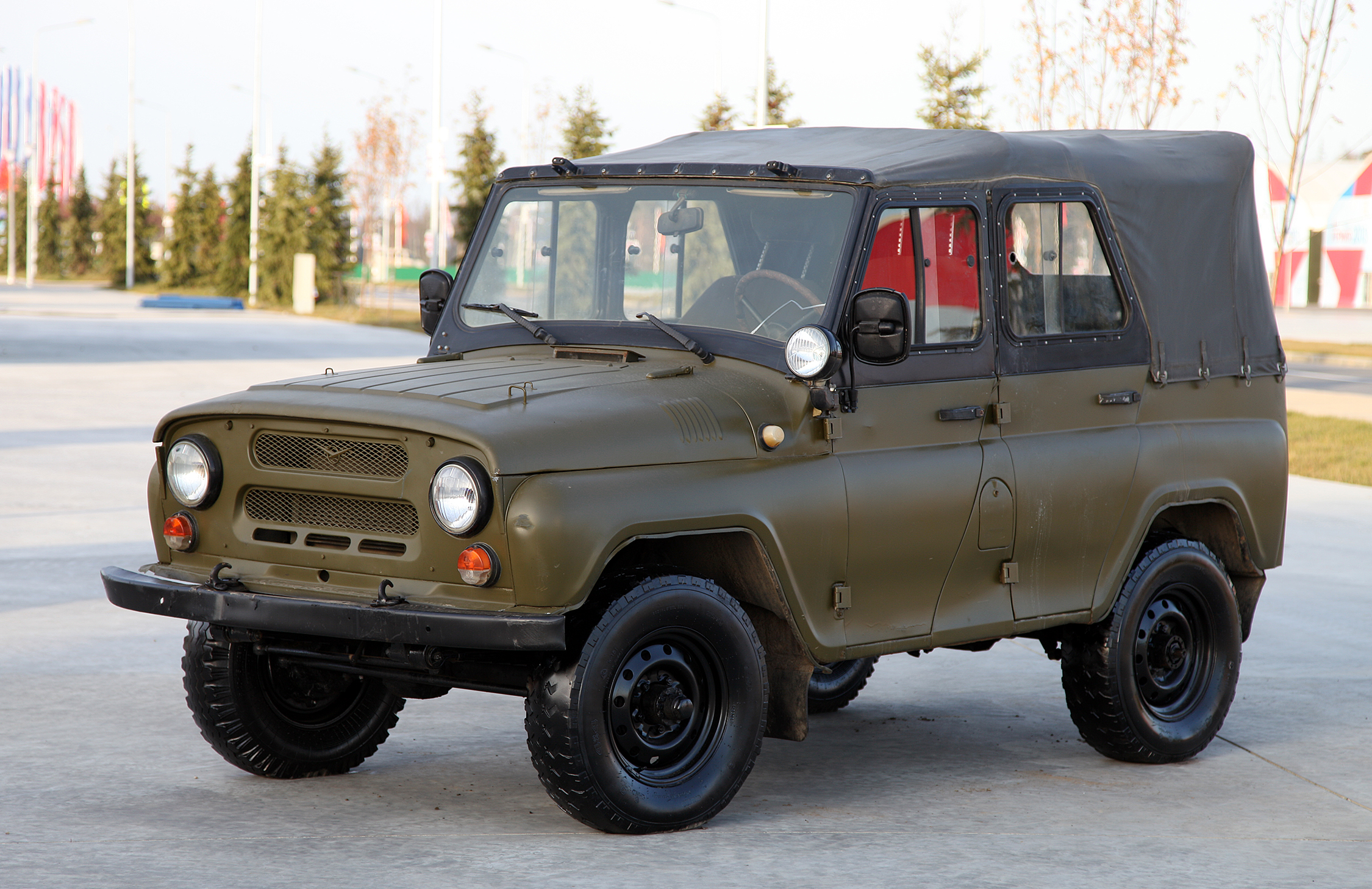
UAZ-469, a Soviet LUV

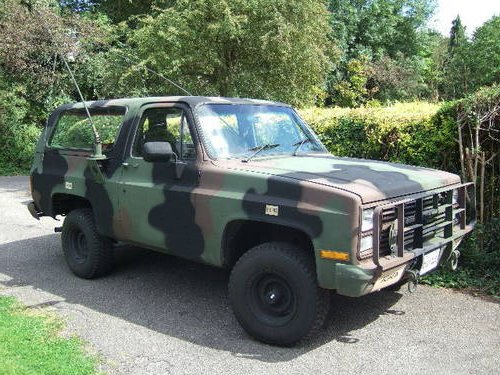
M1009 CUCV, a militarized Chevrolet K5 Blazer

The U.S. revised its jeep into the Willys M38 and M38A1, which was used in the Korean War. It was followed in 1960 by the M151 jeep, which was designed with Ford. By the mid-1980s, this role would be taken over by the larger and heavier Humvee, which would be used as a combat vehicle in Iraq. The United States also purchased Commercial Utility Cargo Vehicles based on commercially available light trucks. U.S. forces are currently defining the Joint Light Tactical Vehicle which would be designed to be armored from the outset, with the smallest 4-person payload capacity class corresponding to the traditional jeep role.

In 1948, the British Land Rover was developed. Originally intended to be a civilian and agricultural successor to the Willys Jeep (the prototype Land Rover was built on the chassis of a Willys and used Willys transmission parts but production vehicles used no Jeep components) the Land Rover was brought into military service in 1949, eventually becoming the standard Light Utility Vehicle for the British Army and many armed forces of the Commonwealth and displacing the purpose built and more expensive Austin Champ. The original Land Rover design evolved into the modern-day Land Rover Defender which is still in military service throughout the world.

About 1953 Russia replaced its GAZ-67B by the GAZ-69, until that series was replaced by the UAZ-469 commander jeep which was introduced in 1971.

In the 1960s, China's Beijing Automobile Works produced its own "jeep", the Beijing BJ212 which was largely a Chinese copy of the Soviet UAZ-469B. Often called the "Beijing Jeep", the BJ121 was widely used in both military and civilian service in China, with over 200,000 produced by end of production in 1983. In May 1983, American Motors Corporation (AMC) agreed to allow the updated BJ2020S to use the 85 hp engine of the XJ Jeep Cherokee. The latest Chinese light utility will be the BJ2022JC 'Brave Warrior', built by Beijing Benz-Daimler Chrysler Automobile Co. Adapted from existing Mercedes Benz designs, the BJ2022JC will carry 0.7 ton, with a wheelbase of 110 inches, and has an independent suspension system with a 101.5 kW 3.2 L turbo-charged inter-cooling diesel engine.

In 2014, Boeing and MSI Design designed the Phantom Badger, in response to the aging Humvee fleet, which was too large for newer aircraft to feasibly carry.

== List of military light utility vehicles ==
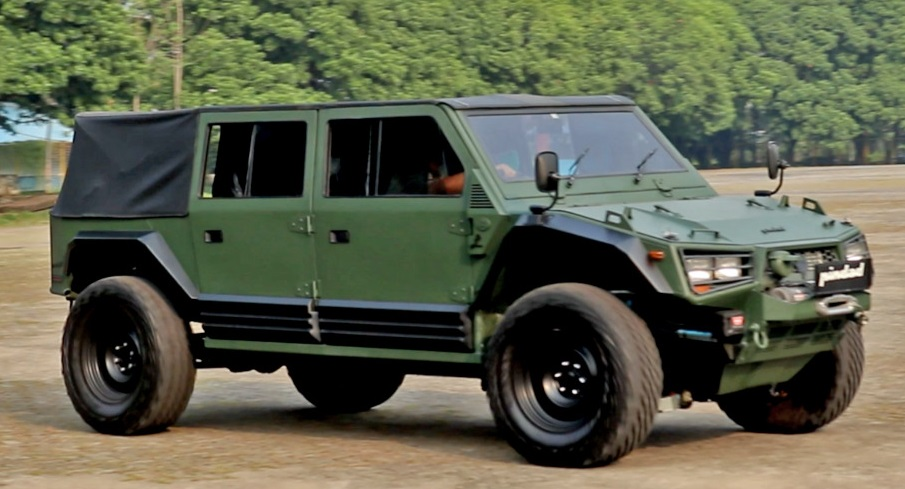
Pindad Maung of the Indonesian Army

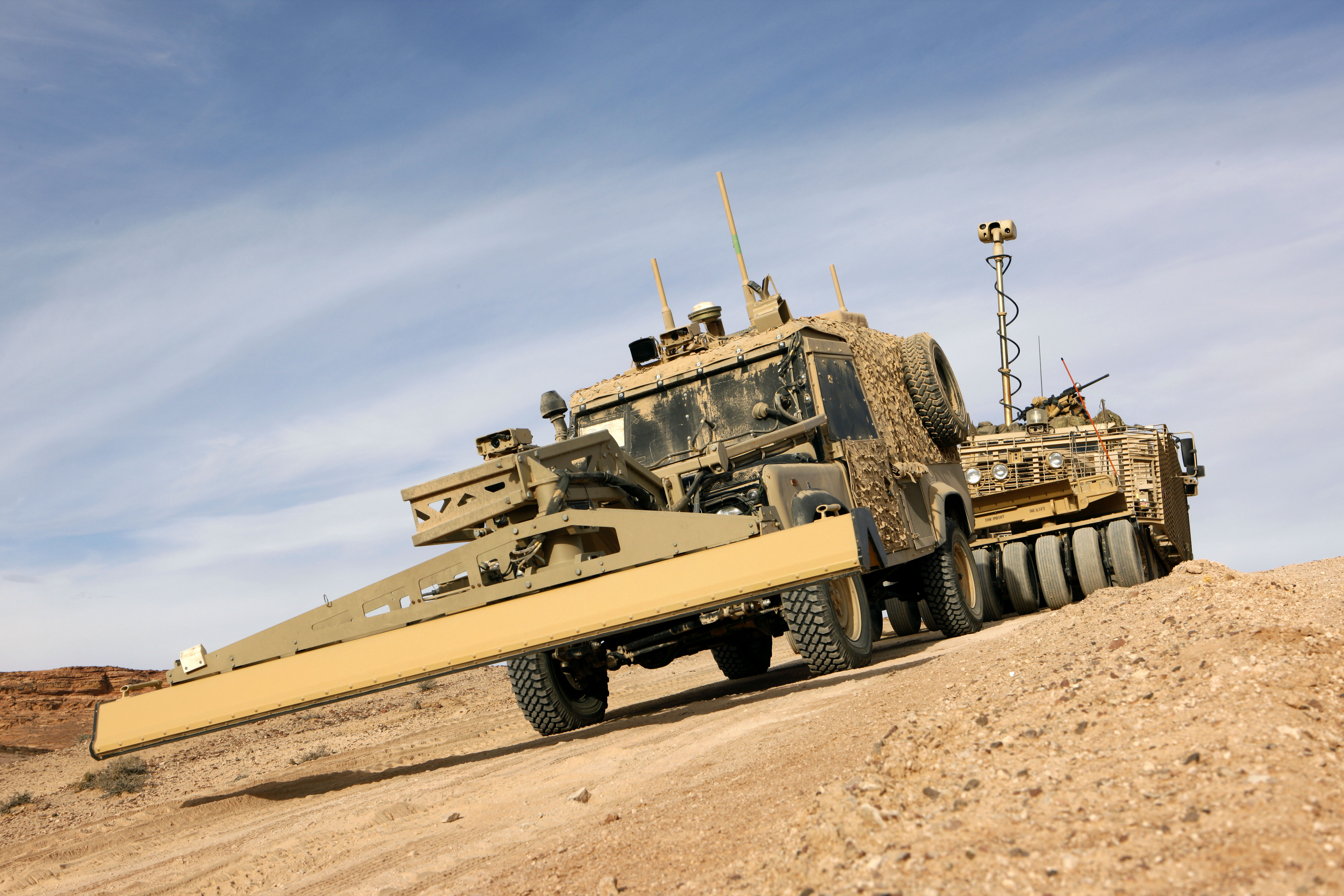
Remote-control "Panama" Land Rover Defender with ground-penetrating radar to find IEDs for the British Army

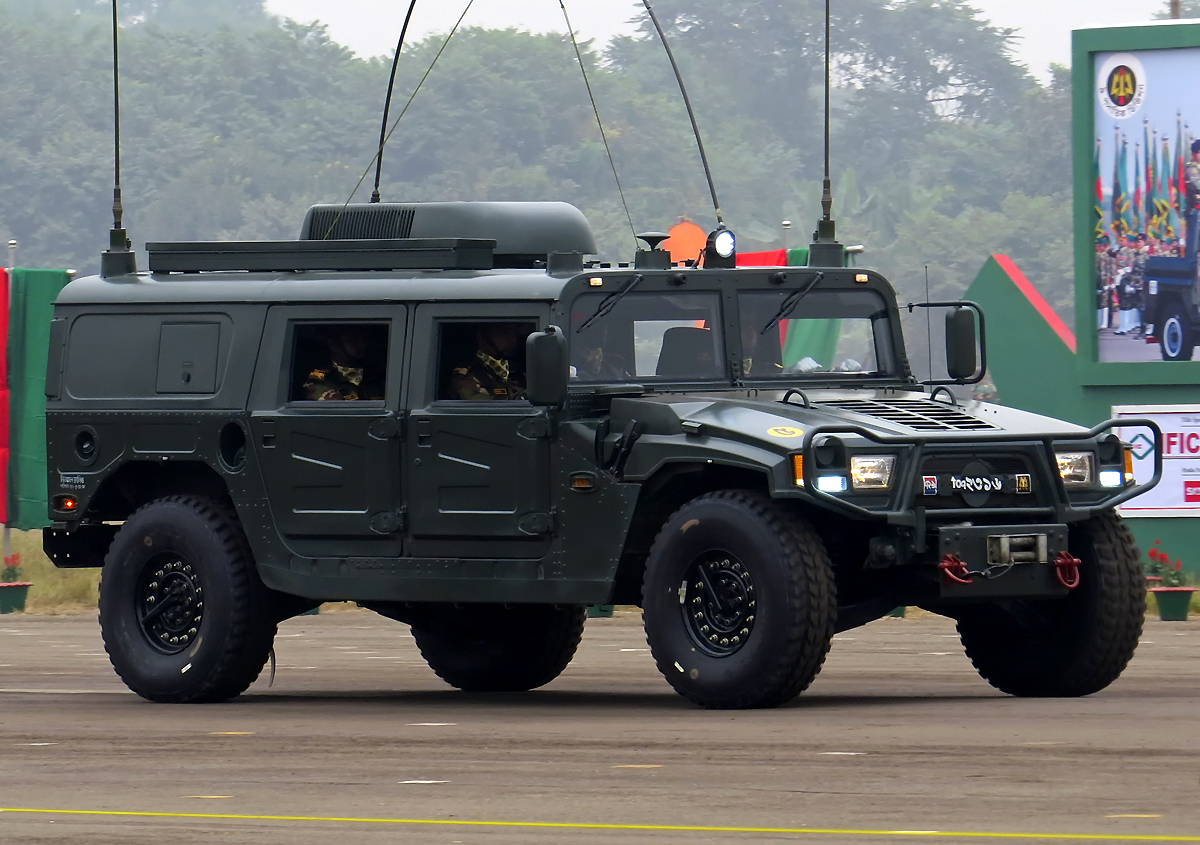
A Bangladeshi army Dongfeng EQ2050 in 2015

- Agrale Marruá
- Cendana Auto Rover
- CMC Cruiser
- Humvee clones in China
- Hawkei
- Indonesian Light Strike Vehicle
- Kia K151 Raycolt
- Land Rover Defender
- Marine Multi-Purpose Vehicle
- MOWAG Eagle
- Renault Sherpa Light
- Thales Australia Hawkei
- Pindad Maung
- Toyota Land Cruiser
- Toyota Mega Cruiser
- Uro VAMTAC
- VLEGA Gaucho
- Weststar GK-M1

== See also ==
- Combat vehicle
- Infantry mobility vehicle

== See also ==
- List of U.S. military jeeps
