= Weststar GK-M1/M2 =

Malaysian light armored car

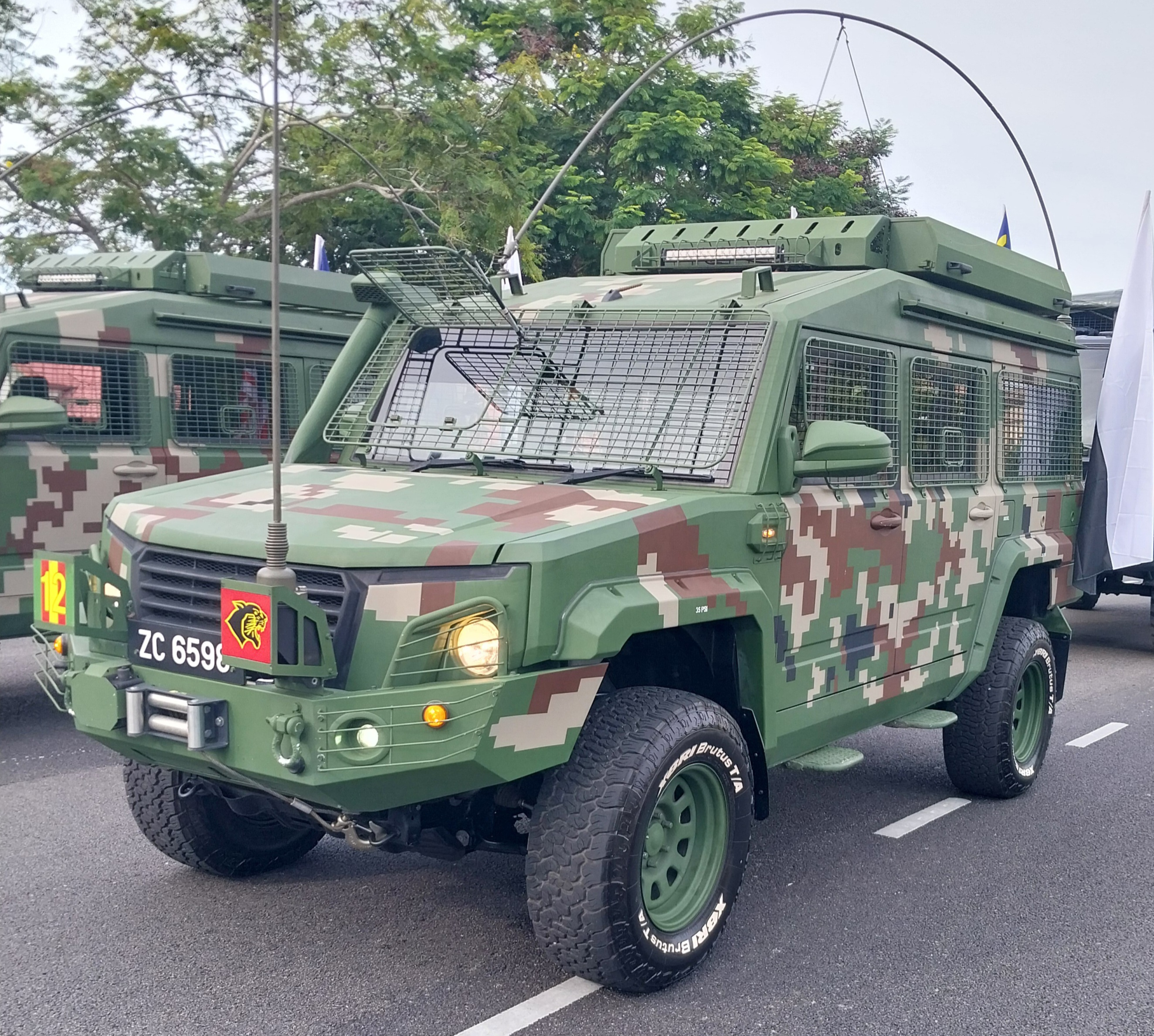
- Weststar GK-M2 FFR variant
- Type: Military light utility vehicle / Light tactical vehicle
- Place of origin: Malaysia

Service history
- In service: Malaysia

Production history
- Designed: 2012
- Manufacturer: Weststar Defence Industries
- Produced: 2015–present

Specifications
- Mass: 4 tonnes
- Length: 5.7 meters
- Width: 1.8 meters
- Height: 2 meters
- Main armament: See variants
- Suspension: 4×4
- Ground clearance: 400mm
- Maximum speed: 110 km/h

The Weststar GK-M1/M2 are Malaysian 4×4 light tactical vehicles (LTV) designed and assembled by Weststar Defence Industries in partnership with Thailand's Thai Rung Union Car. Featuring a wide, angular body design that visually resembles the American Humvee, they are operated by the Malaysian Army in various tactical roles, including command and communications, troop transport, field casualty evacuation, fire support, and mobile air defence. Introduced into service in 2015, the series was procured to progressively replace aging legacy utility fleets, such as the Land Rover Defender, while maintaining lower lifecycle maintenance costs through commercial spare parts availability.

== History ==
The development began through a strategic industrial partnership between Global Komited Sdn Bhd (a subsidiary of Weststar Defence Industries) and Thailand’s Thai Rung Union Car. The collaboration aimed to produce a cost-effective, locally assembled Light Tactical Vehicle (LTV) for the Malaysian Armed Forces.

The prototype GK-M1 made its official public debut at the Defence Services Asia (DSA) exhibition in Kuala Lumpur in April 2014. Weststar delivered an initial, unspecified quantity of GK-M1 vehicles to the military in 2015.

During the Defence & Security 2015 exhibition in Thailand, Thales announced that it had signed a contract to supply the Malaysian Armed Forces with the ForceSHIELD ground-based air defence system, comprising Starstreak surface-to-air missiles, the ControlMaster 200 radar, and a weapon coordination system. This system was integrated onto the Weststar GK-M1 platform. Subsequently, on April 20, 2016, Weststar received a contract from the Malaysian Armed Forces to equip them with 44 GK-M1 Rapid Rover vehicles featuring Lightweight Multiple Launcher (LML) systems, with an additional 44 units planned for follow-on delivery.

Weststar later evolved the vehicle into the GK-M2, featuring an updated body design, improved payload capacity, and modernized electronics suites for tactical C4I integration.

At Defence Services Asia (DSA) 2024, Weststar confirmed that it had delivered an initial batch of 50 GK-M2 Fitted For Radio (FFR) vehicles to the Malaysian Armed Forces under a multi-year procurement agreement, with another 50 units scheduled for delivery in 2025 and a final batch of 50 in 2026.

== Design ==
The GK-M1/M2 are light tactical utility vehicles built on commercial off-the-shelf (COTS) ladder-frame chassis modified for military service. Utilizing a commercial automotive platform provides lower lifecycle maintenance costs and full spare parts compatibility through Toyota's commercial dealership network in Malaysia.

The vehicle's body and structural layout are derived from the Thai Rung Transformer series developed by Thailand's Thai Rung Union Car. The GK-M1 utilizes the TR Transformer I body structure mounted on a 7th-generation Toyota Hilux (Vigo) 4x4 chassis, whereas the GK-M2 adopts the updated TR Transformer II body built on an 8th-generation Toyota Hilux (Revo) chassis. The superstructure consists of a reinforced steel frame with composite panels, heavy-duty steel bumpers, blackout military lighting, front recovery winches, and an upgraded heavy-duty suspension for off-road operations. The GK-M2 redesign introduced a revised front fascia, updated LED lighting, higher payload capacity, and upgraded electrical systems to support command, control, communications, computers, and intelligence (C4I) suites.

The GK-M1 is powered by Toyota 2.5-litre or 3.0-litre D-4D common-rail turbodiesel engines paired with 5-speed manual or automatic transmissions. The GK-M2 uses Toyota GD-series 2.4-litre or 2.8-litre 1GD-FTV turbodiesel engines mated to 6-speed manual or automatic transmissions. Both generations feature selective 4x4 drive with high- and low-range transfer cases. The vehicle has a gross vehicle weight of approximately 4 tonnes, measuring 5.7 m (18 ft 8 in) in length, 1.8 m (5 ft 11 in) in width, and 2.0 m (6 ft 7 in) in height, with a maximum road speed of 110 km/h (68 mph).

== Variants ==
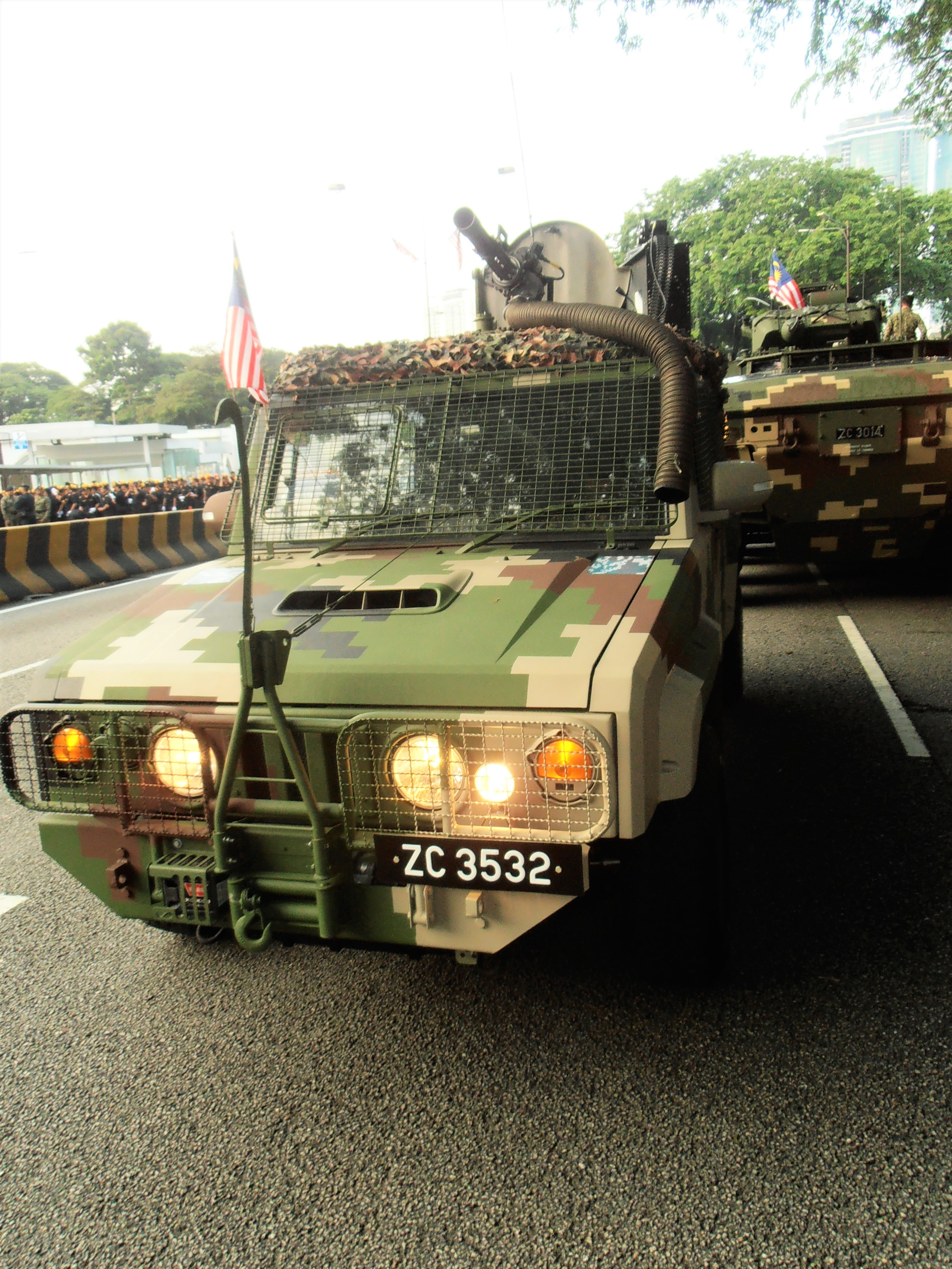
Weststar GK-M1 armed with M134D-H minigun

=== Fitted For Radio ===
Command and communication vehicle to accommodate communications equipment.

=== Special Operation Vehicle ===
An off-road vehicle for special forces units made with COTS parts, unveiled in Defence Service Asia 2016. Offered to the Grup Gerak Khas under the light strike vehicle procurement program.

=== Weapon Carrier ===
A variant equipped with weapons on top of the vehicle. Weapons mounted includes the M134D-H minigun, machine gun and grenade launcher.

=== Ambulance ===
Ambulance vehicle with accommodation of stretchers in the rear compartment.

=== Air Defence ===
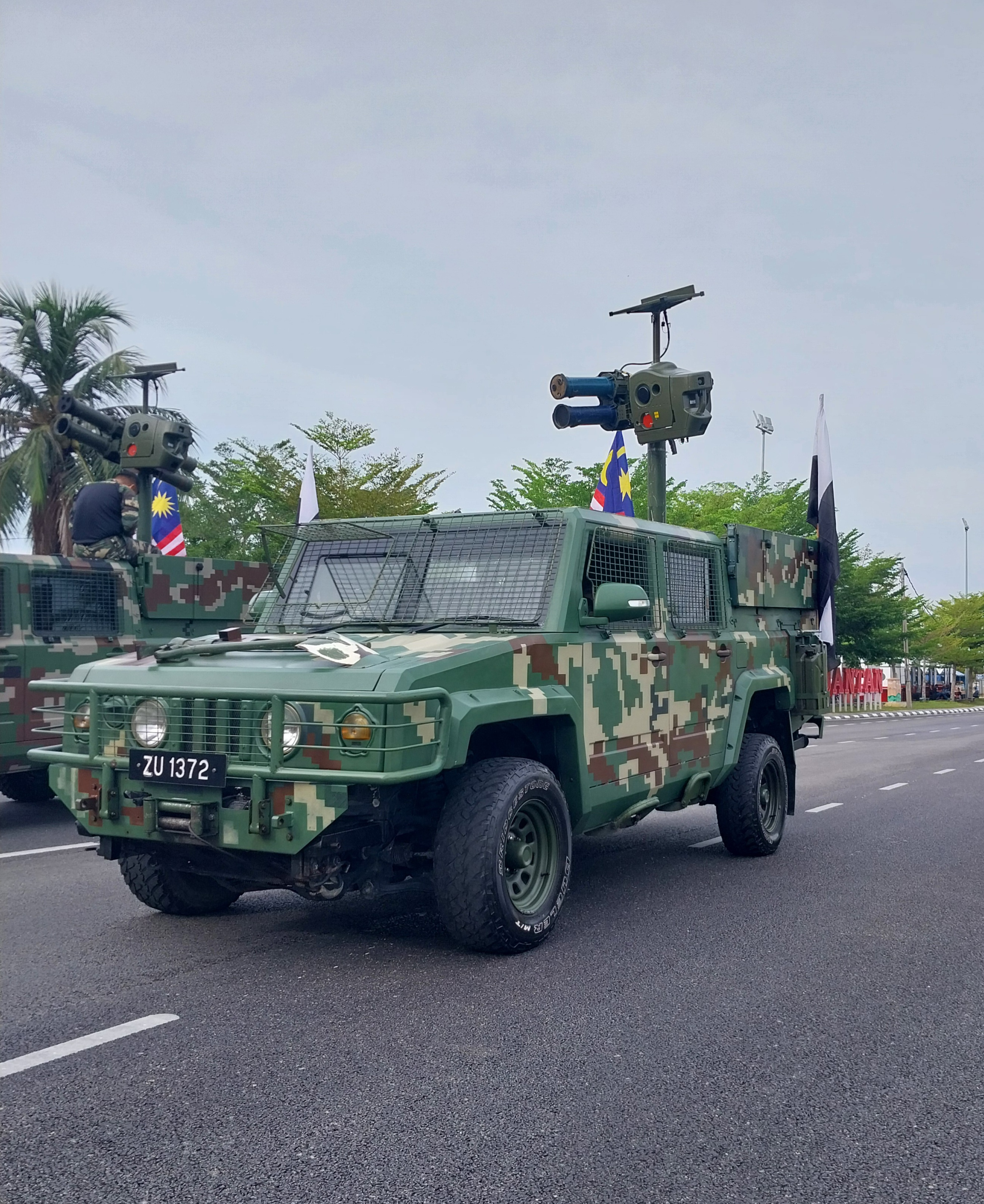
Weststar GK-M1 air defence variant

Air defence variant equipped with Starstreak surface-to-air missiles. They're installed through a Lightweight Multiple Launcher (LML).

== Operators ==
- Malaysia:
  - Malaysian Army - 238 units of all variants (88 GK-M1 and 150 GK-M2).
  - Royal Malaysian Air Force

== See also ==
- Cendana Auto 4x4
