= Cendana Auto 4x4 =

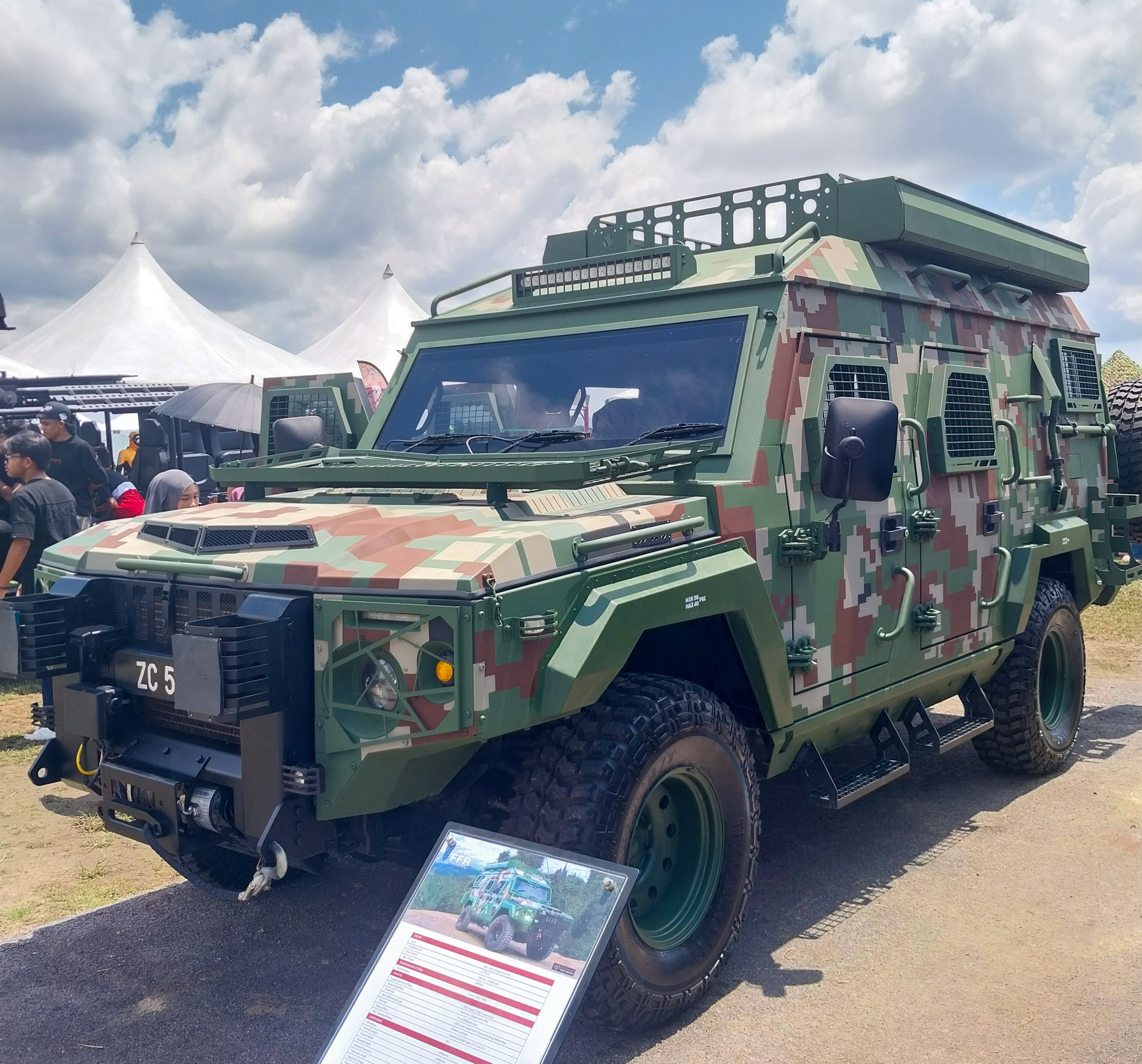
- Cendana Auto FFR variant on display at MAF anniversary day
- Type: Military light utility vehicle / Light tactical vehicle
- Place of origin: Malaysia

Service history
- In service: 2021–present
- Used by: See operators

Production history
- Designed: 2018
- Manufacturer: Cendana Auto
- Produced: 2020–present

Specifications
- Length: 5.2 meters
- Width: 2.1 meters
- Height: 2.3 meters
- Main armament: See variants
- Engine: 2.8 L Turbo Diesel
- Suspension: 4x4
- Maximum speed: 110–180 km/h

The Cendana Auto 4x4 is a Malaysian military light utility vehicle or light tactical vehicle designed and manufactured by a local company Cendana Auto. This vehicles has similarities to the Humvee made by the United States. It is designed to have the ability to be modular for use in various operations hence its consist of various configuration depending on the mission.

== History ==
The development of the vehicle first unveiled by the company in 2018. Its first started with the Special Operation Vehicle (SOV) variant where Cendana Auto introduces its SOV prototype to the public in conjunction of Defence Services Asia (DSA) 2018. According to the company, this SOV prototype was built in response to the Malaysian Army requirement for the light assault vehicle procurement. The SOV variant has a length of 4.95 meters, 1.85 meters high and 1.85 meters wide. Its powered by a single stage turbo diesel engine of 197 horsepower and the speed of the vehicle can reach to a maximum of 170 km/h.

In 2019, the Malaysian Army open a tender to seeks the new light tactical vehicle in various configuration. The variants includes Fitted For Radio Vehicles (FFR), Special Operations Vehicles (SOV), Machine Gun Carriers, Grenade Launcher Carriers and Anti-Tank Guided Missile Vehicles (ATGM). In response to this tender, Cendana Auto announces that they will build the new improved and enlarged version prototype of the vehicle for the testing by the Malaysian Army and ready to be delivering more than 200 units vehicles to the Malaysian Army in various configuration starting 2021.

== Variants ==
=== Fitted For Radio ===
Command and communication variant equipped with communication suite. 70 units ordered by Malaysian Army.

=== Special Operation Vehicle ===
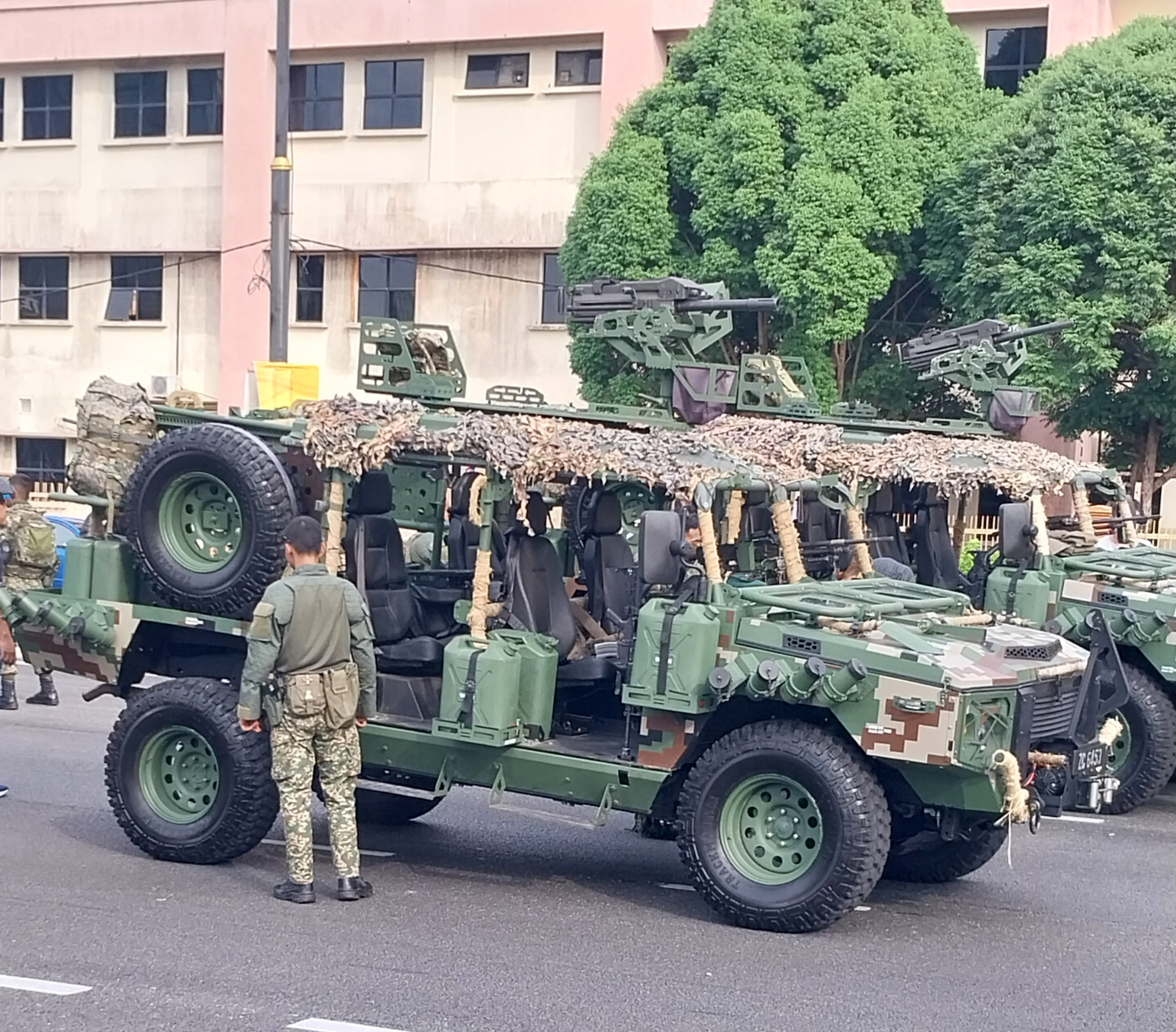
Cendana Auto SF-21X

==== Cendana Auto SF-21X ====
Cendana Auto unveiled the first SOV during Defence Service Asia 2022 (DSA 2022).Officially named as SF-21X. Offered to the Malaysian Army's special forces, Gerup Gerak Khas under the light assault vehicle / light strike vehicle procurement program. 16 units ordered by Malaysian Army.

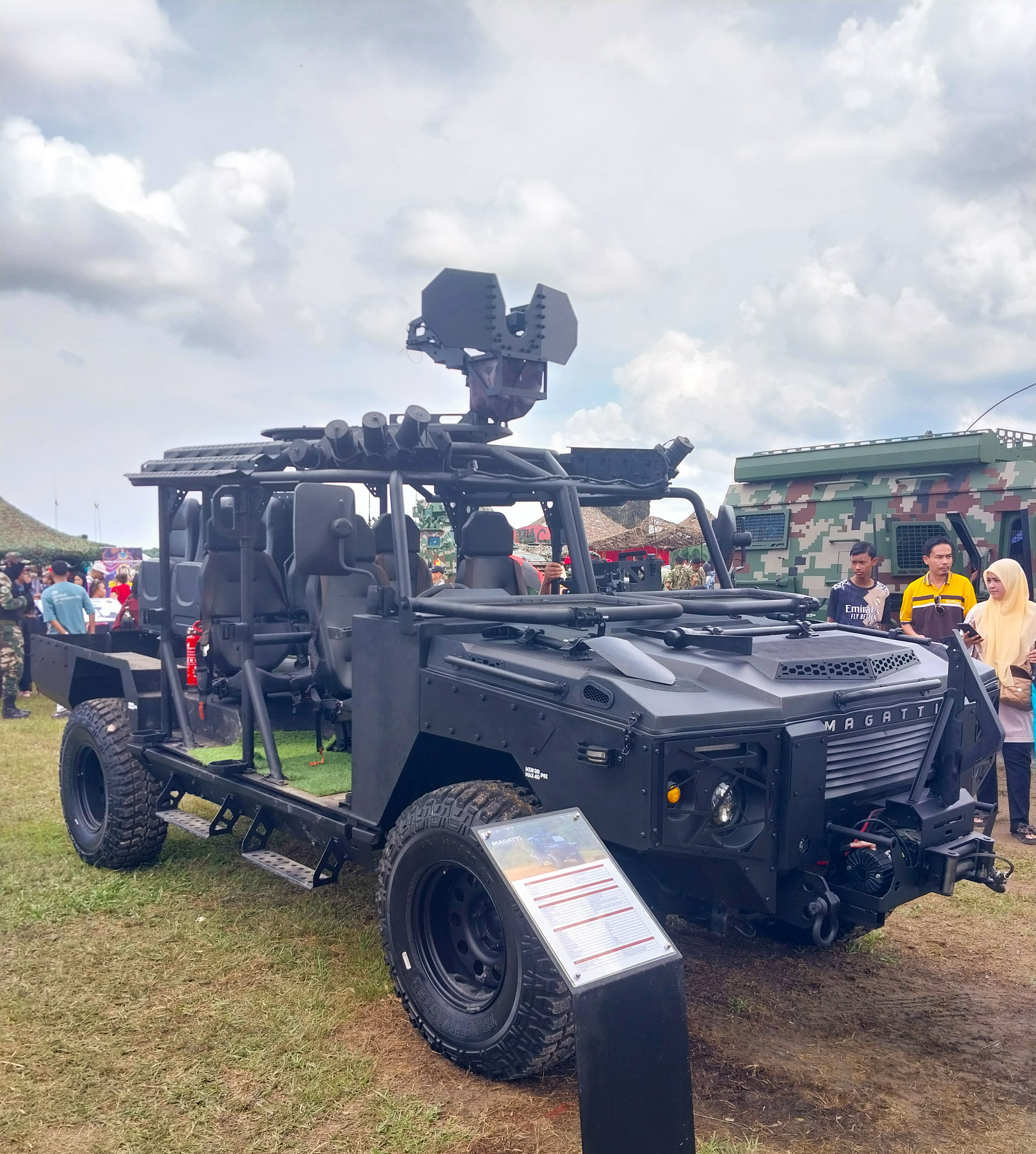
Cendana Auto Magatti

==== Cendana Auto Magatti ====
In Defence Service Asia 2024 (DSA 2024), Cendana Auto unveiled an upgraded version of the vehicle called Magatti. The vehicle powered by a 2.8 litres turbodiesel engine that providing 204 horsepower. It has 5.5 meters long, 2.0 meters wide and 2.5 meters high. The vehicle weighs 4.86 tonnes. It can carry up to 12 operators, two in the front, three in the rear, the machine gunner at the rear, and three per side seated on foldable seats on the side of the rear cargo area. Magatti can be loaded by C-130 Hercules.

=== Weapon Carrier ===
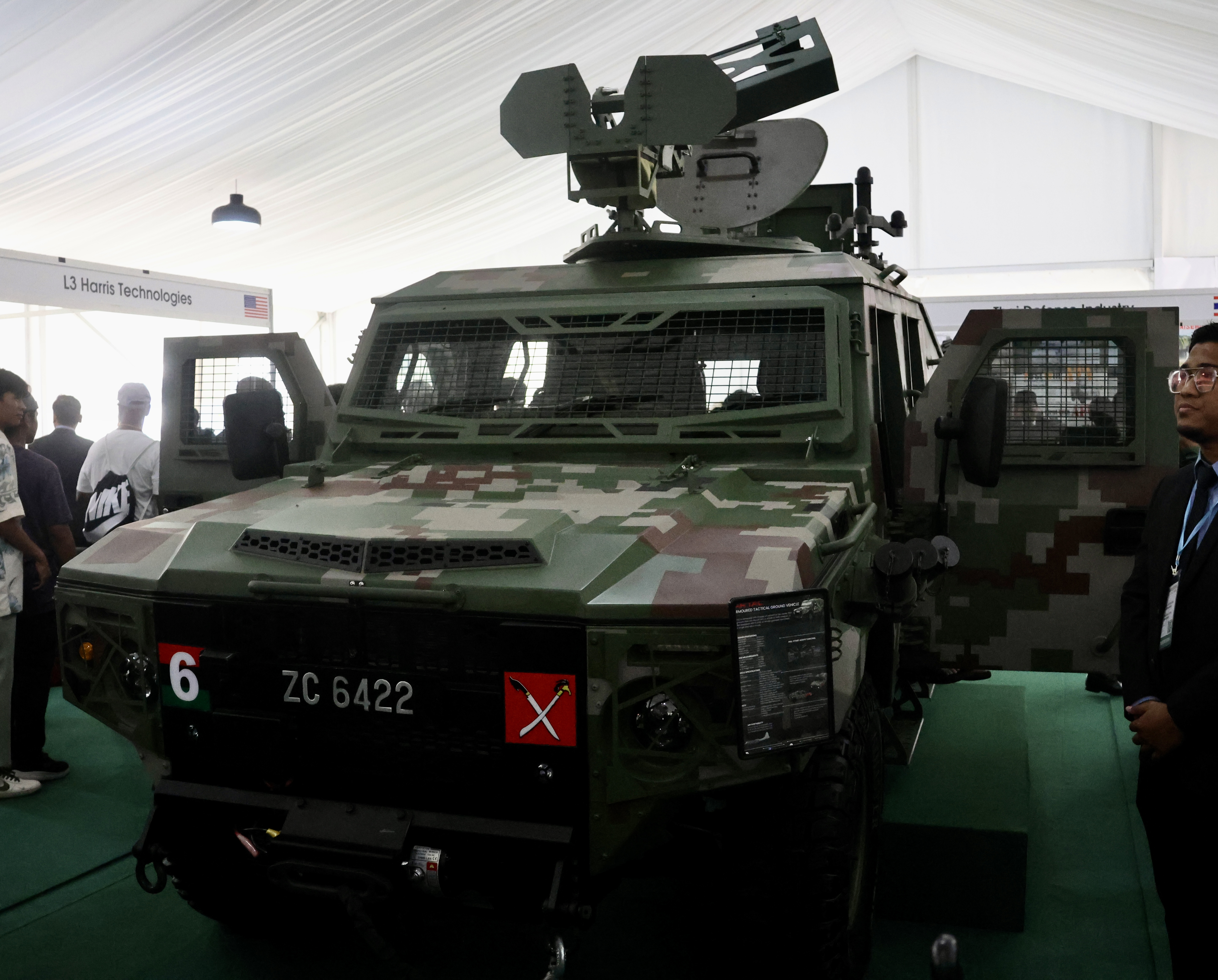
Cendana Auto ARTAC on display at the 2024 RBAF Defexpo

Known as Armed Tactical Ground Vehicles ARTAC. Equipped with weapon such as machine gun, grenade launcher and Karaok ATGM. 49 units ordered by Malaysian Army.

=== Mortar Transporter ===
The MT-815 is equipped with Tecnesis 3000 81mm mortar with the Talos fire control system. Able to carried 90 rounds of ammunition. It can embark a total of six personnel. 72 units ordered by Malaysian Army for the first batch. In 2024, Malaysian Army increased the order to 60 more units bringing the total number of the vehicle to 132 units.

=== Troop Transporter ===
Known as Vextor. The Vextor is 5.6 meters long, 2.05 meters wide and 2.06 high. Powered by Ford 4-cylinder 2.0 litres turbo intercooler diesel which can gives a 139 horsepower. The vehicle can be installed a light remotely controlled weapon station on the roof and the weapon's console would be fitted inside the vehicle.

=== Maritime Surveillance Unit (MSU) Mark III ===
A joint project between Cendana Auto and AMP Corporation (M) Sdn. Bhd. Equipped with 6-meter maritime surveillance radar system and mast, server rack, dual operator tables, lean-to tent and hydraulic stabilizers front and rear for mission-ready deployment.

== Operators ==
- Brunei:
  - Royal Brunei Land Forces - 16 units of ARTAC variant.
- Malaysia:
  - Malaysian Army - 267 units of all variants. (Note: At the beginning; from the total of 207 units of all variant, 72 units were the Mortar Transporter. In 2024, it is confirmed that the army has increased the order from 72 units to 132 units of the Mortar Transporter bringing the total number of 267 units of all variant.)
  - Malaysia Maritime Enforcement Agency - Maritime Surveillance Unit (MSU) Mark III variant. Equipped with AMP Corp mobile maritime surveillance radar.

== See also ==
- Weststar GK-M1/M2
