= Marine Multi-purpose Vehicle =

- Type: Military light utility vehicle
- Place of origin: Philippines

Service history
- In service: Unknown
- Used by: Philippine Marine Corps

Production history
- Manufacturer: Philippine Marine Corps
- Unit cost: 310,000 pesos ($6,312 USD)
- No. built: 8

Specifications
- Armor: Composite Armour
- Main armament: see text
- Engine: 8 Cyl. Diesel; 6.5 L V8 turbo diesel: 190 hp (142 kW) @ 3,400 rpm / 380 lbf·ft (515 N·m) @ 1,700 rpm
- Transmission: 4-speed automatic
- Suspension: Independent 4x4
- Maximum speed: 85 km/h at max gross weight

The Marine Multi-purpose Vehicle or MMPV is a 4x4 utility vehicle built by the Philippine Marine Corps. Similar in concept and appearance to the HMMWV, it was created to replace the M151 jeeps in service, which were becoming difficult to maintain due to a lack of available spare parts.

== Creation ==
The first prototypes of the MMPV are equipped with a 3.5L V6 engine, rated for 141 kW (189 hp/192 ps) and 306 Nm torque. diesel engine and transmission, 4WD and chassis.

== Overview ==
The Marine Multi-purpose Vehicle is built around a tubular-steel frame safety roll-cage which protects the passenger compartment if the vehicle turns over. This cage is covered by a heavy-gauge sheet metal. An electrical winch with a capacity of 5,000 kg (11,023 lb) can be mounted at the front of the vehicle if required, and the windshield can be removed. The passenger compartment is in the center of the vehicle with the driver on the left and two passenger seats to his right. There is space for 0.93 cubic metres (33 cu ft) of cargo behind the passenger seats. A full length skid pan protects the hull and allows the vehicle to slide over obstacles. The transmission is a Mitsubishi A-727 fully automatic with a torque converter, there are 3F and 1R gears - the Marine Multi-purpose Vehicle is in 4 x 4 drive all the time. Limited-slip clutches, in front and rear, and inter-axle differentials automatically distribute more torque to those wheels with the most grip. The independent suspension is of a double 'A' design with a torsion-bar spring and hydraulic telescopic shock absorber at each station. A stabilizer bar is provided for the rear suspension.

The vehicle uses independent suspensions and portal geared hubs similar to portal axles to make for a full 16 inches of ground clearance. The vehicle also has disc brakes on all 4 wheels, and 4-wheel double-wishbone suspension. The brake discs are not mounted at the wheels as on conventional automobiles, but are inboard, attached to the outside of each differential. The front and rear differentials are Torsen type, and the center differential is a regular, lockable type.

The steering is power-assisted and the tubeless tires have a high-pressure tube inner tire which provides a built-in spare for each tube as well as eliminating rim leaks during high speed cornering. The tires are self-cleaning and disc brakes are fitted on all four wheels. The electrical system is 24V DC and two batteries with a capacity of 45 Amp/Hr are provided. The alternator is of the integral rectifier and regulator type. The Marine Multi-purpose Vehicle is proved with a heavy duty towing pintle as well as a trailer wiring harness receptacle. It is air-transportable and can be air-dropped.

== Variants ==
When approval is obtained, the Philippine Marines plan to produce variants of the MMPV, including the following:

Anti-Armour: A recoilless 106 mm rifle mounted above the crew compartment and a total of thirty five rounds of ammunition.

Reconnaissance: Fitted with a ring-mounted .50cal M2HB machine guns with a 360 degree traverse

Convoy Escort/ Security Vehicle: This can be provided with a pintle-mount 5.56mm/7.62 mmCal GPMG's, M174 automatic grenade launcher's and various other similar weapons. These weapons can also be mounted on the reconnaissance model on the ring mount.

The following kits are available for the basic vehicle: Crew compartment armor kit, consisting of a high-hardness steel doors, side body panels, toe panel, firewall, bulletproof windshield and bulletproof side windows. Armored radiator, Armored fuel tank, Top and door kit (waterproof fabric with plastic windows and hinged doors) Various communications installations, High output alternators, 100 and 180 Amp, Litter-carrying kit, Jump seat for two additional passengers., Explosion resistant reticulated foam fuel-tank filler, Radial ply tires or bulletproof foam-filled tires, Extreme climate kits for winterization or desert temperatures, Tool kit and portable fire extinguisher.

Proposed Sub Variants:

- Troop transports
- Armament Carrier, Armored
- Ambulance
- Communications
- Command posts
- Military Police vehicles

== Armament ==
- M40 recoilless rifle
