= 11th Special Service Regiment =

Malaysian Army special operations unit

- Rejimen ke-11 Gerak Khas
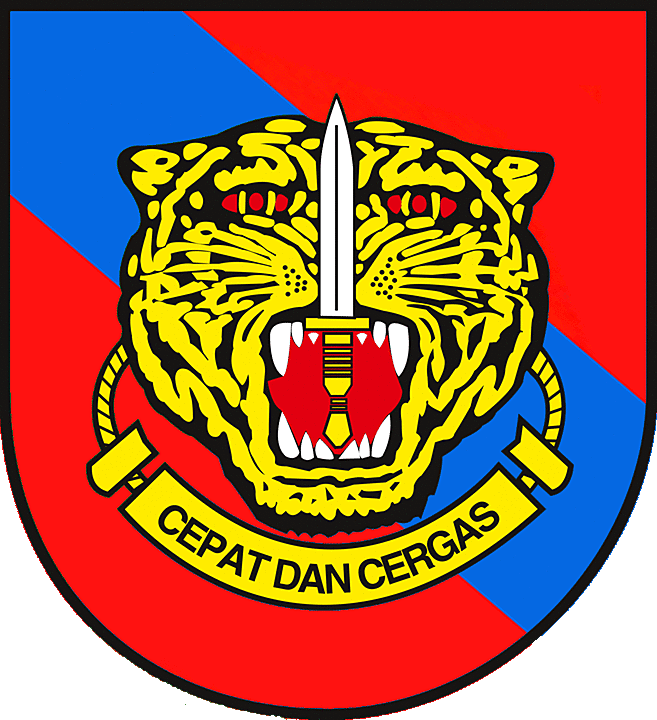
- Founded: 1 April 1981; 45 years ago
- Country: Malaysia
- Branch: Malaysian Army
- Type: Special forces
- Size: 4 squadrons, and 1 headquarters
- Part of: 21st Special Service Group
- Headquarters: Camp Sungai Udang
- Nicknames: Malaysian Special Air Service, Unit Lawan Keganasan (Anti-Terrorism Unit)
- Motto: Tetap Unggul (Still the Superior)

Commanders
- Current commander: Colonel Mohd Khairun Nadzar Abdul Kadir

The 11th Special Service Regiment (Abbr. 11 SSR, Malay: Rejimen ke-11 Gerak Khas (stylised 11 Rejimen Gerak Khas — 11 RGK)), also known as Anti-terrorism Unit (Unit Lawan Keganasan), (Note: The 11 SSRs were not disclosed to the media in the past. Not much is known about the 11 SSR's other specialist squadrons besides the anti-terrorism unit. As a result, all 11 SSRs are referred to as Unit Lawan Keganasan.) is the premier unit of the Malaysian Army's special forces. The 11 SSR is one of the regiments under Gerak Khas, along with the 21st and 22nd Commando Regiment. Their headquarters are currently located at Camp Sungai Udang in Malacca.

The 11 SSR is modelled closely on the British Army's 22nd Special Air Service. Personnel are recruited exclusively from experienced commandos who have already served within other Gerak Khas units.

The regiment is commanded by Colonel Mohd Khairun Nadzar Abdul Kadir, who assumed leadership from Lieutenant Colonel Muhamad Nor Ishak on 7 January 2026.

== History ==
=== Created as a combat intelligence unit for army commandos ===
The Malaysian Intelligence Corps established the 11th Special Service Regiment (abbreviated as 11 SSR) and its sister unit, the 12th Special Service Regiment (abbreviated as 12 SSR), on 1 April 1981, as combat intelligence units for army commandos. They served as specialists in counter-revolutionary warfare for two commando regiments operating under the Malaysian Special Service Group (now recognised as the 21st Special Service Group).

The 11 SSR is embedded into the 21st Para Commando Regiment (now known as the 21st Commando Regiment), while the 12 SSR is embedded with the 22nd Para Commando Regiment (now known as the 22nd Commando Regiment). Much like the SAS during the Troubles in Northern Ireland, their mission encompassed intelligence, surveillance, target acquisition, reconnaissance, and the harassment of the adversary's leadership.

=== The dissolution of the 12th Special Service Regiment ===
In 1983, the Malaysian Special Service Group (MSSG) disbanded the 12 SSR, resulting in the 11 SSR no longer functioning as a sub unit of the 21st Para Commando. The MSSG assimilated it and elevated it to the position of a counter-revolutionary warfare expert for the entire MSSG instead. The remaining members of the 12 SSR were integrated into the 11 SSR. Drawing inspiration from the capabilities of the British 22nd Special Air Service, the 11 SSR developed new specialised skills, including airborne pathfinders and frogmen.

=== Elements of counter-terrorism have been included in the 11 SSR ===
Prior to the official end of the Communist insurgency in Malaysia in 1989, the primary focus of nearly all special forces in Malaysia, including the 11 SSR, was guerrilla warfare and jungle combat. Counter-terrorism was the responsibility of the Royal Malaysian Police's special forces unit, the Special Actions Unit (Malay: Unit Tindakhas). Post-1989, the Malaysian government sought to establish units capable of addressing terrorism, leading to the inclusion of counter-terrorism training for both the Royal Malaysian Police's 69 Commando and the 11 SSR. Under the Nelson Glory Project in 1990, counter-terrorism instructors from the 22 Special Air Service (22 SAS) were dispatched to impart their expertise to the 11 SSR. This initiative resulted in a significant restructuring of the 11 SSR's sabre squadrons, differentiating them from the organisational framework of the 22 SAS. (Note: Each SAS squadron comprises teams with a variety of capabilities, such as Air troops, Mobility troops, Mountain troops, and Boat troops. See Special Air Service#Squadrons.)

Each Sabre squadron under the 11 SSR now distinguishes itself with specific capabilities and specialties, reflecting its individual roles and functions, in contrast to the 22 SAS.

=== Separation of the Special Boat Squadron from the 11th Special Service Regiment ===
In 2009, a significant restructuring occurred within the 21st Special Service Group units, leading to the reorganisation of the 22nd Commando Regiment (22 CDO) to specialise specifically in amphibious warfare. Consequently, the 11 SSR's Special Boat Squadron (Malay: Skuadron Perahu Khas) was integrated with the 22 CDO.

== Organisation ==
As part of the Commonwealth, Malaysia's military system is akin to that of the United Kingdom. The 11th Special Service Regiment is modelled after the British 22nd Special Air Service and the Malayan Scouts. Previously, the 11 SSR had five squadrons; as the 22nd Commando Regiment (22 CDO) became a special forces unit specialising in amphibious operations, the Victor 'V' Squadron from the 11 SSR moved to the 22 CDO. Currently, the 11 SSR operates with four squadrons, along with a headquarters and a family welfare support unit, which are:

=== Current squadrons ===
Unit's name (English)	Unit's name (Bahasa Malaysia)	Nickname(s)	Motto	Unofficial logo	Specialty	Notes
11 SSR's Headquarters	Markas 11 RGK				Administration and other tasks	
Sierra 'S' Squadron	Skuadron Sierra	'Skuadron Tedung' (Cobra's Squadron), 'Skuadron Tinjau Khas Udara' (Airborne Special Recon Squadron)	Mengintip Memusnah		Special reconnaissance (by parachute), direct action and pathfinder	Modelled after the Air Troops of the Special Air Service
Tango 'T' Squadron	Skuadron Tango		Mencari & Memusnah		Special reconnaissance, counter-guerrilla, hunter-killer and direct action.	Modelled after the Mobility Troops of the Special Air Service
Uniform 'U' Squadron	Skuadron Uniform	'Skuadron Lawan Keganasan' (Counter-Terrorism Squadron), 'Black Ghost'	Membunuh Menggeledah		Counter-terrorism, hostage rescue, direct action, and special reconnaissance	Modelled after the Counter Terrorist Wing of the Special Air Service
11 SSR's Logistics Squadron	Skuadron Logistik 11 RGK		Membantu Demi Kejayaan		Military logistics	

==== Family welfare support ====
11 SSR's BAKAT manages the family welfare support for the 11th Special Service Regiment (11 SSR). This organisation, under the leadership of the spouse of the Commander of 11 SSR, operates with the commander serving as its patron. BAKAT plays a crucial role in overseeing the well-being and providing support for the families associated with the regiment, providing a vital network of assistance and resources.

=== National Special Operations Force ===
The National Special Operations Force (NSOF) held the position of Malaysia's top counter-terrorism task force, recruiting exclusively from the finest counter-terrorism units within the country, such as the 11 SSR, the 69 Commando, the Special Actions Unit, PASKAL, PASKAU, and STAR. Operating under the direct authority of the Prime Minister's Office, the NSOF enjoyed increased autonomy, robust support from all federal government agencies, and substantial funding. Selected commandos from the 11 SSR's Uniform Squadron were granted the honour of joining this elite task force. However, the National Special Operations Force was disbanded in July 2018.

=== Defence Special Operations Division ===
The Defence Special Operations Division (DSOD; Malay: Bahagian Operasi Pasukan Khas Pertahanan — BOPKP) is a division of the Ministry of Defence formed by the Malaysian Armed Forces (MAF) in 2018. It takes over the National Special Operations Force, following the MAF's acknowledgement of the importance of joint special operations in the nation's security. The DSOD is a tri-service focused special operations unit that operates directly under the Joint Force Headquarters and draws personnel exclusively from within the MAF formation, unlike that of its predecessor.

== Recruitment, selection and training ==
Given the distinct specialities of each squadron within the 11 SSR, the recruitment process for each squadron varies. To be eligible for selection in the 11 SSR, an applicant must currently serve as a member of any Gerak Khas-related unit (such as the 21st Special Service Group, the Special Warfare Training Centre, or the 91st Intelligence Operations Group), maintain a clean disciplinary record, and have completed more than six years of service in any Gerak Khas-related unit.

According to Major (Retd) Nazar Talib's book "Menjunjung Bere Hijau" (2012), the 11 SSR is more inclined to recruit Malaysian Army commandos with expertise in explosive ordnance disposal.

== Notable missions ==
=== Bosnia and Herzegovina 1992-1996 ===
From its inception, Malaysia actively participated in the United Nations Protection Force (UNPROFOR) in Bosnia and Herzegovina as a dedicated peacekeeping force. Between 1992 and 1996, Malaysia contributed a total of 6085 peacekeepers across nine military contingents to both UNPROFOR (1992–1995) and IFOR (1995–1996) operations. Notably, the 11th Special Service Regiment assumed a central role as the primary special operations unit on the ground. (Note: At that time, Malaysia was the only Muslim country sending special forces for peacekeeping in Bosnia and Herzegovina. The 11th Special Service Regiment was chosen as part of a Combat Rescue Team for the United Nations in that region.) They were frequently called upon to support peacekeeping forces from other nations, particularly during missions in challenging locations like Sniper Alley.
