= JMF Elite Unit =

Elite special-operations unit of the Johor Military Force in Malaysia

- JMF Elite Unit Badge
- Founded: 7 July 2008; 18 years ago
- Country: Malaysia
- Allegiance: Sultan of Johor
- Branch: Royal Johor Military Force
- Type: Special forces
- Role: Special operations; Counterterrorism; Direct action; Executive protection; Hostage rescue
- Garrison/HQ: Istana Besar, Johor Bahru
- Nickname: "Komando JMF" (JMF's Commando)
- Mottos: Pantas, Berani, Setia ('Fast, brave, loyal')

Commanders
- Commanding officer: Major General Tunku Ismail Idris

The JMF Elite Unit, formerly known as the JMF Elite Forces until 2023, is an elite special forces unit under the administration of the Johor Military Force (JMF). The JMF serves as the private army of the state of Johor, located in the southern part of Peninsular Malaysia, just north of Singapore.

The primary mission of the JMF Elite Unit is to provide security and close protection to His Majesty the Sultan of Johor and the Johor Royal Family. The unit is equipped with advanced special operations capabilities, including amphibious reconnaissance, counterterrorism, and hostage rescue crisis management.

In times of armed conflict, the JMF Elite Unit can be attached to the Malaysian Armed Forces, operating as part of the nation’s special forces when needed.

== History ==
=== Establishment as JMF Elite Forces ===
After returning to Johor in December 2007 from his service with the Indian Army, Tunku Ismail Idris, envisioned remodelling the Johor Military Force (JMF) to include roles akin to the Pontifical Swiss Guard. Recognising the need for a specialised unit within the JMF, he established the JMF Elite Forces on 7 July 2008, during his tenure as the JMF’s 2nd Staff Operations and Training Officer.

The formation of this unit aimed to introduce a specific doctrine within the JMF, enhancing its capability to efficiently perform critical tasks while providing close protection for the Johor Royal Family.

To lay a strong foundation for the unit, Tunku Ismail and 20 selected officers and members from the JMF underwent a rigorous counterterrorism selection course facilitated by the Malaysian Army’s 21st Special Service Group (21 SSG), the Malaysian Army’s Special Forces Command. The three-month training at Sri Iskandar Camp, Mersing, Johor, was conducted with the assistance of the Yankee Alpha Squadron of the 22nd Commando Regiment. The course provided essential technical expertise and specialised skills in close protection, counterterrorism, and other critical operational areas needed for their mission.

=== Renaming to JMF Elite Unit ===
In 2023, as part of a broader effort to standardise the naming conventions of all units within the JMF, the JMF Elite Forces was officially renamed the JMF Elite Unit. This change reflected the unit’s evolving structure and its alignment with the modernisation of the Johor Military Force.

== Objectives ==
The establishment of the JMF Elite Unit (formerly known as the JMF Elite Forces) serves several key objectives:

- Selecting the best members to join the Elite Unit of the Johor Military Forces.
- Producing members who are steady and authoritative in carrying out the tasks of the Elite Unit of the Johor Military Forces.
- Instilling discipline and identity within and outside of tasks.
- Fostering a spirit of brotherhood and camaraderie among the members of the Elite Unit of the Johor Military Forces.
- Creating a new generation that is of high quality, disciplined, and has a rational mindset.
- Fostering unwavering loyalty to the Sultan and the State of Johor that is undivided.

These objectives reflect the unit's commitment to operational excellence, professional development, and steadfast allegiance to the royal family and the state.

== Duties and responsibilities ==
The JMF Elite Unit undertakes a specialised range of duties distinct from those of the regular Johor Military Force (JMF), including:

- Close Protection for the Royal Family
  - Ensuring the safety and security of the Johor Royal Family from any threats, with particular emphasis on:
    1. His Majesty the Sultan of Johor
    2. Her Majesty the Sultanah of Johor
    3. His Royal Highness the Crown Prince of Johor (Tunku Mahkota Johor)
    4. Designated royal family members with titles
    5. Individuals specified by royal decree or command
- VIP Escort Duties
  - Providing security escorts for distinguished individuals and dignitaries.
- Event Security
  - Performing security duties for official government events involving the presence or departure of the Johor Royal Family.
- Special Operations
  - Undertaking special assignments as mandated by the unit's leadership.
- Rapid Deployment
  - Remaining on constant standby, prepared for mobilisation at any time.
- Provost Duties
  - Acting as the unit's military police, enforcing discipline and order within JMF.
- Intelligence and Surveillance
  - Serving as the "eyes and ears" of JMF, gathering intelligence to ensure operational security.

== Selection and advanced training ==
Entry into the JMF Elite Unit is exclusively open to active Johor Military Force (JMF) personnel, primarily from the JMF Guards Unit. His Majesty the Sultan of Johor encourages personnel in their early 20s to attempt selection, emphasising the importance of maintaining physical fitness for service in the special forces unit.

The selection process is rigorous, with a high attrition rate of approximately 90%. Candidates must pass two internal Physical Fitness Tests (PFTs) before advancing to the Malaysian Army Special Forces Selection at the Special Warfare Training Centre (SWTC).

=== Physical Fitness Test (PFT) ===
The initial stage is conducted at JMF camps and spans one week. It focuses on testing physical endurance through activities such as obstacle courses and extensive running.

=== Advanced Physical Fitness Test (APFT) ===
This preparatory stage further assesses candidates' mental and physical resilience. It is mandatory for all new candidates and current members of the JMF Elite Unit. Current members are required to pass this stage regularly to maintain their fitness levels in line with unit standards. Failure to meet the standards may result in removal from the unit. Candidates who pass the APFT proceed to the Malaysian Special Forces Selection.

Stages of APFT:

- Camp stage:
  - Obstacle course
  - Fitness training
  - Combat training
  - Unarmed combat training
- City Stage:
  - 30 kilometres (19 mi) daytime run
- Final Stage:
  - 30 kilometres (19 mi) speed march in 40 kilograms (88 lb) of full battle gear, completed within 3 hours

=== Malaysian Special Forces Selection (4+12 Weeks) ===
Successful candidates are attached to the Malaysian Army and undergo training at the SWTC, located in Sungai Udang Camp, Malacca. Training begins with a four-week Warm-up for the Basic Commando Course, followed by the 12-week Basic Commando Course. Upon passing this demanding selection, candidates graduate in accordance with Malaysian Army commando traditions. Graduates are awarded the green beret, light blue lanyard, and the Fairbairn–Sykes commando knife. After graduation, candidates return to the JMF and proceed to further training within the unit.

=== Advanced Training: Special Forces Specialist Course ===
JMF Elite Unit members receive advanced training at Sri Iskandar Camp in Mersing. This Special Forces Specialist Course is conducted by the 22nd Commando Regiment and SWTC, equipping members with skills in:

- Special infiltration and reconnaissance course
- Sniper course
- Close quarters combat
- Combat diving
- Counter-terrorism
- Counter-sniper tactics
- Marksmanship
- Sabotage
- Combat search and rescue
- Fighting in built-up areas
- Hostage rescue
- Military operations on urbanized terrain
- Close protection
- Special demolitions
- Explosive ordnance disposal

== Identities ==
The uniforms of the Johor Military Force (JMF) are standardised across all units, including the JMF Elite Unit. However, members of the elite unit are distinguished from regular personnel by specific accessories and insignias that signify their elite status and specialised training.

JMF Elite Unit Skill badge

The gold JMF Elite Unit skill badge is awarded to members upon successfully completing the Special Forces Specialist Course. This badge is prominently worn on the left breast pocket of their service dress, signifying their elite training and qualification. For combat uniforms, a black and olive version of the badge is used, maintaining its distinctiveness in operational attire.

Light blue lanyard

The light blue lanyard, a symbol of commando training, was originally adopted by the Malaysian Special Service Unit (MSSU), now succeeded by Gerak Khas, from the 40 Commando, Royal Marines. In modern Malaysia, it is prominently worn by commandos of the Malaysian Army's Gerak Khas and the Royal Malaysian Air Force Special Forces, representing their elite status. This lanyard is also awarded to commando-trained Johor Military Force (JMF) soldiers upon completing the rigorous Malaysian Special Forces Selection at the Special Warfare Training Centre (SWTC), marking their inclusion into this distinguished fraternity.

'Elite Forces' shoulder tab

The Elite Forces shoulder tab features the words "Elite Forces" embroidered in yellow on a black background, symbolising the unit's distinction. This version is worn on the left shoulder of the service dress uniform. For combat uniforms, a black-on-olive version of the tab is used, maintaining the unit's identity in operational settings.

== See also ==
- Royal Johor Military Force
- Elite Forces of Malaysia
