= Sabre squadron (disambiguation) =

Sabre squadron, or (in US English) saber squadron, is a military term for an operational unit, as opposed to a headquarters or support unit, at sub-battalion level. "Sabre Squadron" may also refer to:

- a 1966 novel by Simon Raven, The Sabre Squadron;
- US 2nd Squadron, 3rd Armored Cavalry Regiment, a. k. a. "Saber Squadron";
- an expansion pack to the game Hidden & Dangerous 2
- an operational constituent of a UK or Commonwealth SAS Regiment
