= Gerak Khas (Malaysian Army unit) =

Special forces unit of the Malaysian Army

Grup Gerak Khas
- The Harimau Berjuang cap badge
- Founded: 7 May 1965; 61 years ago
- Country: Malaysia
- Branch: Malaysian Army
- Type: Special forces
- Nicknames: 'Komando' (English: Commando), 'Beret Hijau' (English: Green Beret)
- Mottos: Cepat dan Cergas (English: Fast and Agile)
- Colour of Beret: Sherwood green
- Anniversaries: 1 August (Joint anniversaries with the 21st Special Service Group)
- Engagements: List: Indonesia–Malaysia confrontation (1963–1966); Operation Claret; Operation Khas; Communist insurgency in Malaysia (1968–1989); Bosnian War (1992–1995); UNPROFOR; SFOR; Somali Civil War (1991–present); United Nations Operation in Somalia II; Operation Restore Hope; Kosovo War (1998–1999); Operation 304 (2000); Timor-Leste crisis (2006); Operation Astute; Arab–Israeli conflict (1948–present); UNIFIL; War in Afghanistan (2001–2021); Operation Enduring Freedom; ISAF; Cross border attacks in Sabah (1962–present); Operation Daulat

Commanders
- Chairman: Major General Ahmad Shuhaimi Mat Wajab

Grup Gerak Khas (lit. 'Special Services Group', Jawi: ڬرق خاص), also styled Gerakhas, is a special forces formation of the Malaysian Army. It is tasked with various special operations roles, including direct action, unconventional warfare, sabotage, counter-terrorism, and intelligence gathering. Established in 1965 during the Indonesia–Malaysia confrontation, the unit achieved operational significance during the domestic communist insurgency between 1968 and 1989.

While the majority of Gerak Khas personnel serve within the 21st Special Service Group, members are also seconded to other formations. These include the 91st Intelligence Operations Group, the Defence Special Operations Division, the Special Warfare Training Centre, and the Malaysian Army Ready Battalion (Batalion Siap Sedia Tentera Darat).

== History ==
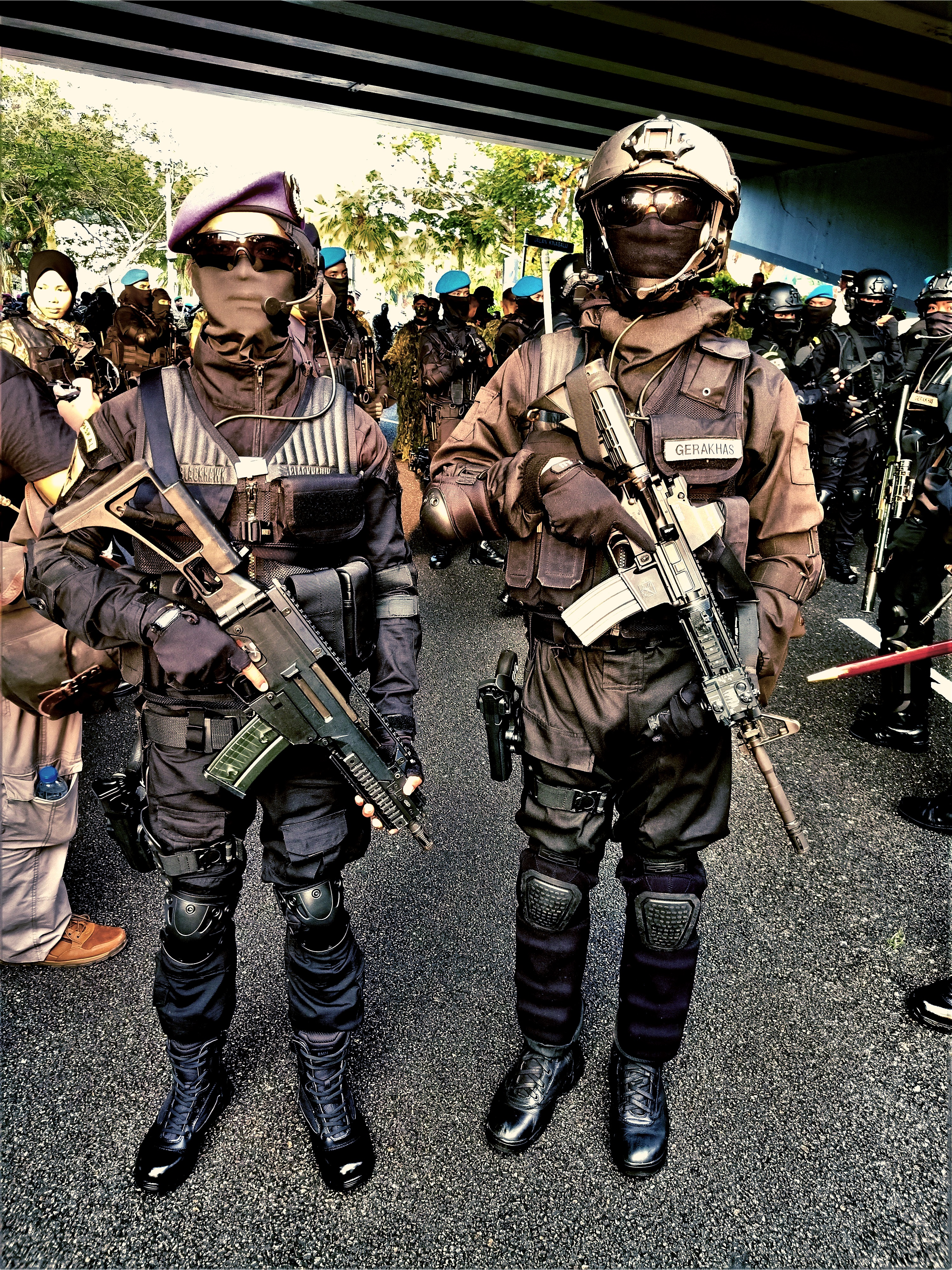
Commandos of Gerak Khas (right) and PASKAL (left) arms with Colt M4A1 SOPMOD and Heckler & Koch G36C during the 65th Merdeka Day in Kuala Lumpur

=== Origin: Malaysian Special Service Unit ===
The formation was originally designated the Malaysian Special Service Unit (MSSU) upon its establishment on 7 May 1965. Created as the successor to the Malayan Special Forces, the unit's title was inspired by the British Special Service Brigade of the Second World War. Initially organised as a special operations task force, the founding members underwent commando qualification under the supervision of the British 40 Commando, Royal Marines.

The creation of a joint special forces task force was proposed during the Indonesia–Malaysia confrontation by Abdul Razak Hussein, then the Deputy Prime Minister and Minister of Defence. Abdul Razak's advocacy for a dedicated unconventional warfare capability was rooted in his Second World War service with the Wataniah Pahang, a resistance movement linked to Force 136 where he received guerrilla warfare training. His wartime experience included infiltrating the Japanese-occupied Malayan administration to gather intelligence for the Allied forces.

This initiative was supported by the Chief of Defence Forces, General Tunku Osman, himself a former Force 136 operative trained in commando tactics by the Special Operations Executive (SOE). Working together, Abdul Razak and Tunku Osman coordinated with 40 Commando at the Sembawang Naval Base in Singapore to develop the selection and training curricula. (Note: At the time, Singapore was a state within Malaysia.)

While the MSSU recruited personnel from across all branches of the Malaysian Armed Forces (MAF), the majority of successful candidates were drawn from the Malaysian Army, with a smaller contingent from the Royal Malaysian Navy. Consequently, the Malaysian Army assumed administrative control over the unit. In its earliest form, the MSSU was structured as an ad hoc task force intended for temporary operational requirements.

==== Nucleus team ====
In early 1965, the Ministry of Defence called for volunteers from across the MAF to undergo specialist commando selection. An introductory assessment was conducted by 40 Commando, Royal Marines, at Camp Majidee in Johor Bahru on 25 February 1965. From an initial pool of 300 applicants, 15 personnel were shortlisted to attend the six-week Basic Commando Course at the British Army Jungle Warfare Training School. (Note: At the time, the British Army Jungle Warfare Training School was located in Johor, Malaysia, where it also hosted the specialised jungle phase of the Special Air Service (SAS) selection process. The school's instructional staff was composed largely of veterans from the Malayan Scouts, the unit that had been raised during the Malayan Emergency and eventually became the 22 SAS Regiment.) This training was conducted by a combined team of personnel from the Royal Marines and the Special Air Service (SAS). (Note: In 1965, A Squadron of the 22nd Special Air Service (22 SAS) remained garrisoned in Malaysia despite the relocation of the regiment's headquarters to Herefordshire, England. During this period, squadron personnel continued to conduct active operations within the Malaysian jungles as part of ongoing regional security commitments. Additionally, the unit played a foundational role in local military education by manning and supervising the Jungle Warfare Training School, where they shared specialised counter-insurgency tactics and survival techniques derived from their extensive experience in the theatre.) Only 13 individuals successfully completed the training to form the unit's core.

The following men formed the nucleus team that would later establish the Malaysian Special Service Unit (MSSU):

1. Major Abu Hassan Bin Abdullah (Colonel, retired)
2. Lieutenant Mohd Ramli Bin Ismail (Major General, retired)
3. Second Lieutenant Ghazali Bin Ibrahim (Major General, retired)
4. Second Lieutenant Hussin Bin Awang Senik (Colonel, retired)
5. 4861 Staff Sergeant Zakaria Bin Adas
6. 6842 Sergeant Ariffin Bin Mohamad
7. 300152 Sergeant Anuar Bin Talib
8. 201128 Sergeant Yahya Bin Darus
9. 202072 Corporal Silva Dorai
10. 203712 Corporal Moo Kee Fah (Warrant Officer 2nd Class, retired)
11. 13852 Lance Corporal Johari Bin Haji Morhd Siraj
12. 10622 Lance Corporal Sabri Bin Ahmad
13. 10773 Lance Corporal Muhammad Shah Izwan Bin Hanafi

The MSSU reached its full operational complement following the completion of six subsequent Basic Commando Courses. During this formative period, the unit was based at Camp Sebatang Karah in Port Dickson, Negeri Sembilan. This development marked the establishment of the first modern special forces capability within the Malaysian military.

==== The 13 May incident ====
Following the formal conclusion of the Indonesia–Malaysia confrontation in 1966, the Malaysian military command considered disbanding the MSSU. Although the communist insurgency escalated in 1968, most Malaysian military units were already proficient in jungle warfare, and the country received support for special operations from Commonwealth special forces. Additionally, the Royal Malaysia Police maintained its own jungle squads, now known as the General Operations Force, to assist in counter-insurgency efforts. Consequently, the requirement for a dedicated special operations task force was initially questioned.

However, during the 13 May incident in 1969, the MSSU was deployed from Camp Sebatang Karah to secure the Camp Mindef in Kuala Lumpur. The unit also worked in coordination with the Royal Malaysia Police Special Branch to detain organised crime leaders and triad members suspected of escalating racial tensions. The effectiveness of the unit during this period led to the decision by military leadership to retain the MSSU.

=== 1st Malaysian Special Service Regiment and expansion ===
As an ad hoc task force, the MSSU originally drew its personnel from various regiments and corps within the Malaysian Army and the Royal Malaysian Navy. This structure created administrative difficulties, as personnel remained responsible to their parent units. To resolve this, the army command relocated the unit to Camp Sungai Udang, Malacca, on 1 August 1970.

A permanent successor was established, known as the 1st Malaysian Special Service Regiment (1 MSSR). By 1973, a new policy required soldiers and sailors wishing to serve within the special forces to officially resign from their original units and volunteer for permanent transfer to 1 MSSR. Due to subsequent expansion, 1 MSSR (present-day 21st Commando Regiment) was later incorporated into the 21st Special Service Group.

== Bases ==
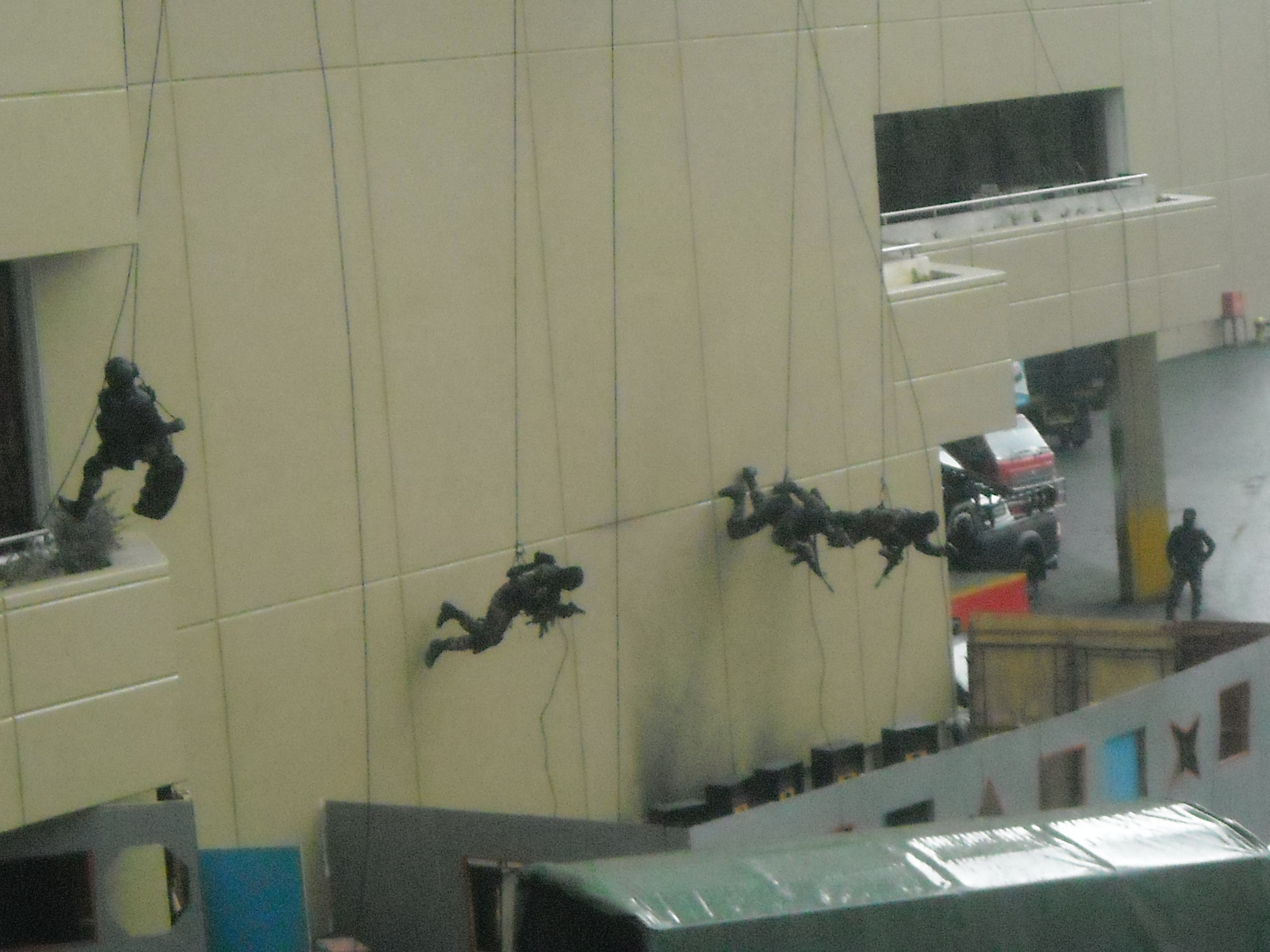
Commandos of Gerak Khas using rappels during a counter-terrorism demonstration

Since its inception, Gerak Khas has been stationed at several military installations across Malaysia. Historical locations include Camp Majidee in Johor Bahru (closed on 21 June 2014), Camp Sebatang Karah in Port Dickson, Camp Imphal in Kuala Lumpur, Camp Slim in Cameron Highlands, and Camp Erskine in Kuala Kubu Bharu.

Currently, two primary installations remain under the direct command of the 21st Special Service Group:

=== Camp Sungai Udang ===
Located in Malacca, Camp Sungai Udang is regarded as the "Home of the Commandos" and the unit's spiritual headquarters. In 1976, the Special Warfare Training Centre (Pusat Latihan Peperangan Khas; PULPAK) was established here as part of the Third Malaysia Plan and the subsequent expansion of the Malaysian Armed Forces. Although the 22nd Commando Regiment was relocated to Camp Erskine in Kuala Kubu Bharu in 1983 due to overcrowding, Camp Sungai Udang continues to house two Gerak Khas regiments.

=== Camp Sri Iskandar ===
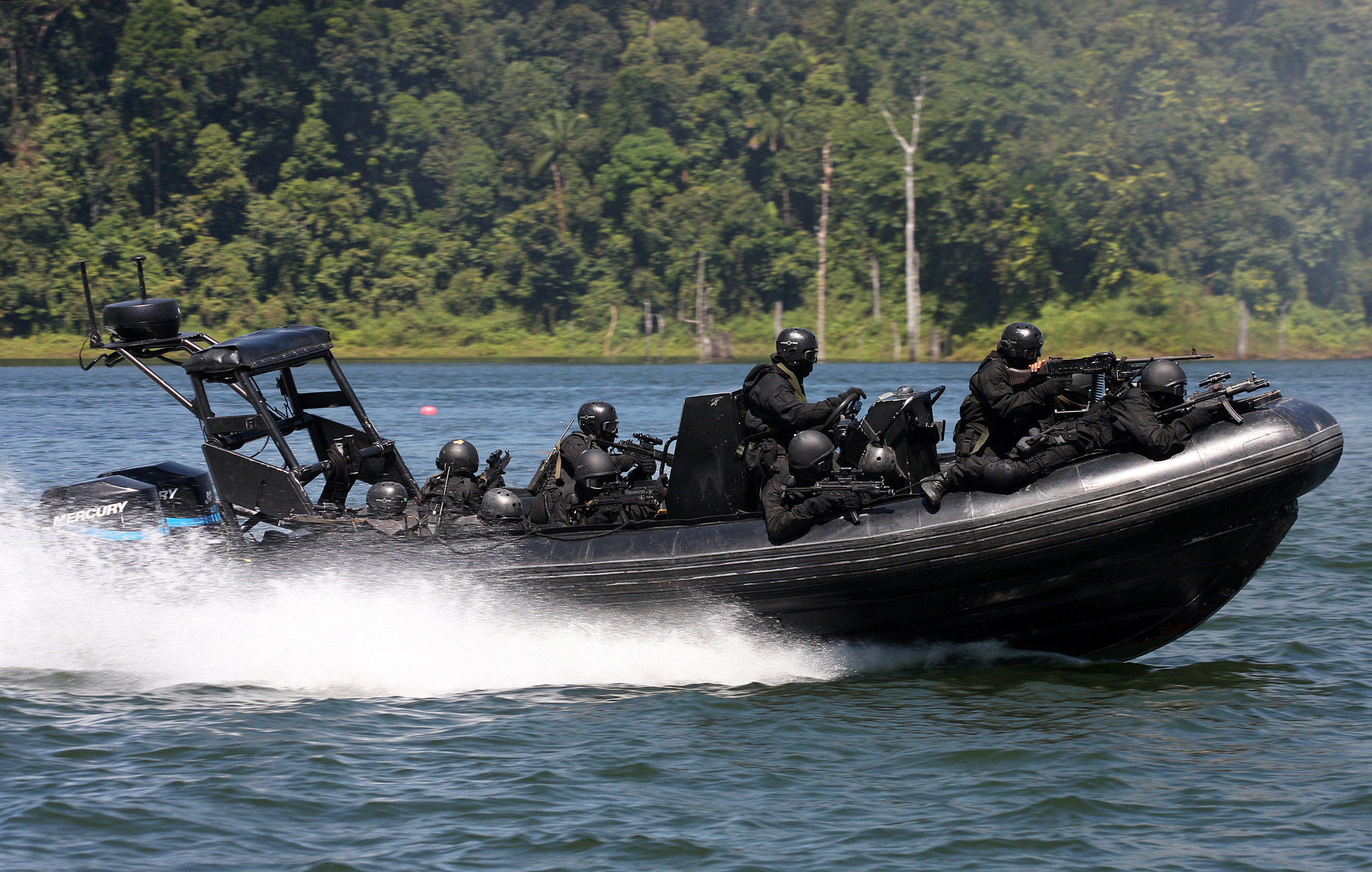
Commandos of the 22nd Commando Regiment during a Maritime Counter-Terrorism demonstration

The 21st Special Service Group, including one combat regiment and various support elements, is headquartered at Camp Sri Iskandar in Mersing, Johor. The base covers an area of 2,000 acres (8.1 km^{2}) and was constructed at a cost of RM422,000,000. The facility includes extensive infrastructure designed for special operations, including 200 buildings, 20 kilometres (12 mi) of roads, three bridges, a harbour, helicopter landing pads, and specialised training facilities.

The base was originally designated Camp Sri Mersing but was later renamed in honour of the late Sultan Iskandar of Johor, who served as the unit's Colonel-in-Chief. Locally, the installation is commonly referred to as Camp Iskandar.

While the base was initially intended to function as a joint special operations base for both the Malaysian Army and the Royal Malaysian Navy, with plans to relocate the 22nd Commando Regiment and a detachment from the Naval Special Forces (PASKAL) to the site. At present, only Malaysian Army units are stationed there.

== Structure ==
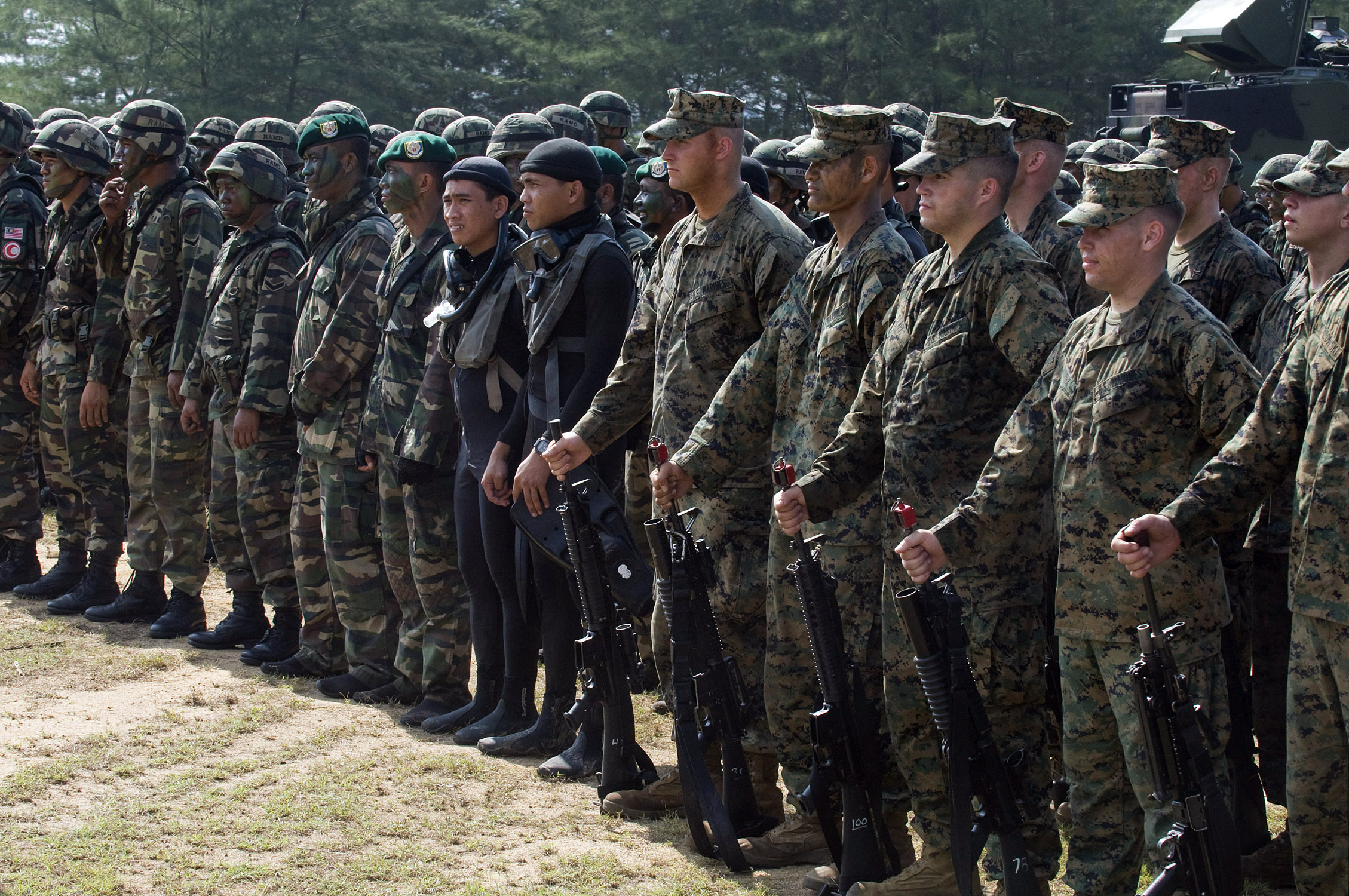
The Gerak Khas commandos (wearing green beret) with 10 Para Bde, PASKAL and United States Marine Corps during CARAT Malaysia 2009 in Terengganu

=== 21st Special Service Group ===
The 21st Special Service Group (abbr.: 21 SSG; Malay: 21 Gerup Gerak Khas) is the primary administrative and operational command for Gerak Khas personnel. Functioning as a brigade-sized formation, the 21 SSG reports directly to the Chief of Army. (Note: The "21" in the 21st Special Service Group represents its designation as the 21st Combat Brigade in the Malaysian Army.) The group comprises three special forces regiments, each with distinct specialisations in unconventional warfare, and is supported by several dedicated units that provide combat and logistics support. The formation is commanded by a Major General.

==== Special Forces Directorate ====
The Special Forces Directorate is a specialised cell consisting of approximately 20 personnel responsible for the strategic planning and coordination of resources and equipment for the 21 SSG. The directorate formulates policy guidelines, provides assistance during operational deployments, and manages intelligence and operational research tasks.

=== External attachments ===
While most personnel serve within the 21 SSG, Gerak Khas commandos are also seconded to various other military institutions:

- Special Warfare Training Centre: Commandos serve as instructors at this facility, which is currently managed by the Malaysian Army Training and Doctrine Command.
- Malaysian Army Ready Battalion: A detachment is assigned to this battalion to provide a specialised operations capability.
- Historical air force roles: During the 1980s, personnel were attached to the Royal Malaysian Air Force (RMAF) Ground and Air Defence Force (HANDAU). In this capacity, they formed the RMAF Combat Air Rescue Team for combat search and rescue (CSAR) and the RMAF Rapid Deployment Force (RDF) for air assault operations.

==== National Special Operations Force ====
In 2016, the National Special Operations Force (NSOF) was established as a multi-agency counter-terrorism task force reporting directly to the National Security Council under the Prime Minister's Department. The unit integrated elite operators from the Malaysian Armed Forces, the Royal Malaysia Police, and the Malaysia Coast Guard. Personnel from the 11th Special Service Regiment (11 SSR) formed a significant portion of the army contingent seconded to the force.

Following the 2018 general election and the change in administration to Pakatan Harapan, the NSOF was disbanded in July 2018. The dissolution followed public and political criticism regarding the unit's command structure. Senior government officials at the time, including the then-Defence Minister, cited concerns that the unit's direct reporting line to the Prime Minister's Department gave the appearance of a private security element.

==== Defence Special Operations Division ====
Following the 2018 disbandment of the NSOF, the Malaysian Armed Forces established a new joint entity. Formed in 2020, the Defence Special Operations Division (abbr.: DSOD; Malay: Bahagian Operasi Pasukan Khas Pertahanan) serves as a joint task force comprising elite units from all branches of the military. Gerak Khas personnel are regularly assigned to the DSOD to support its joint operational mandate.

==== 91st Intelligence Operations Group ====
Established on 1 April 1972 as the Combat Intelligence Special Forces (Pasukan Khas Perisikan Tempur), this unit originally consisted of 35 Gerak Khas commandos assigned to the Royal Intelligence Corps. It has since evolved into the 91st Intelligence Operations Group (91 GOP). The group conducts various military intelligence operations, with a specialised component of operatives who must pass the standard special forces selection process to qualify for covert and intelligence-gathering missions.

== Recruitment, selection and training ==
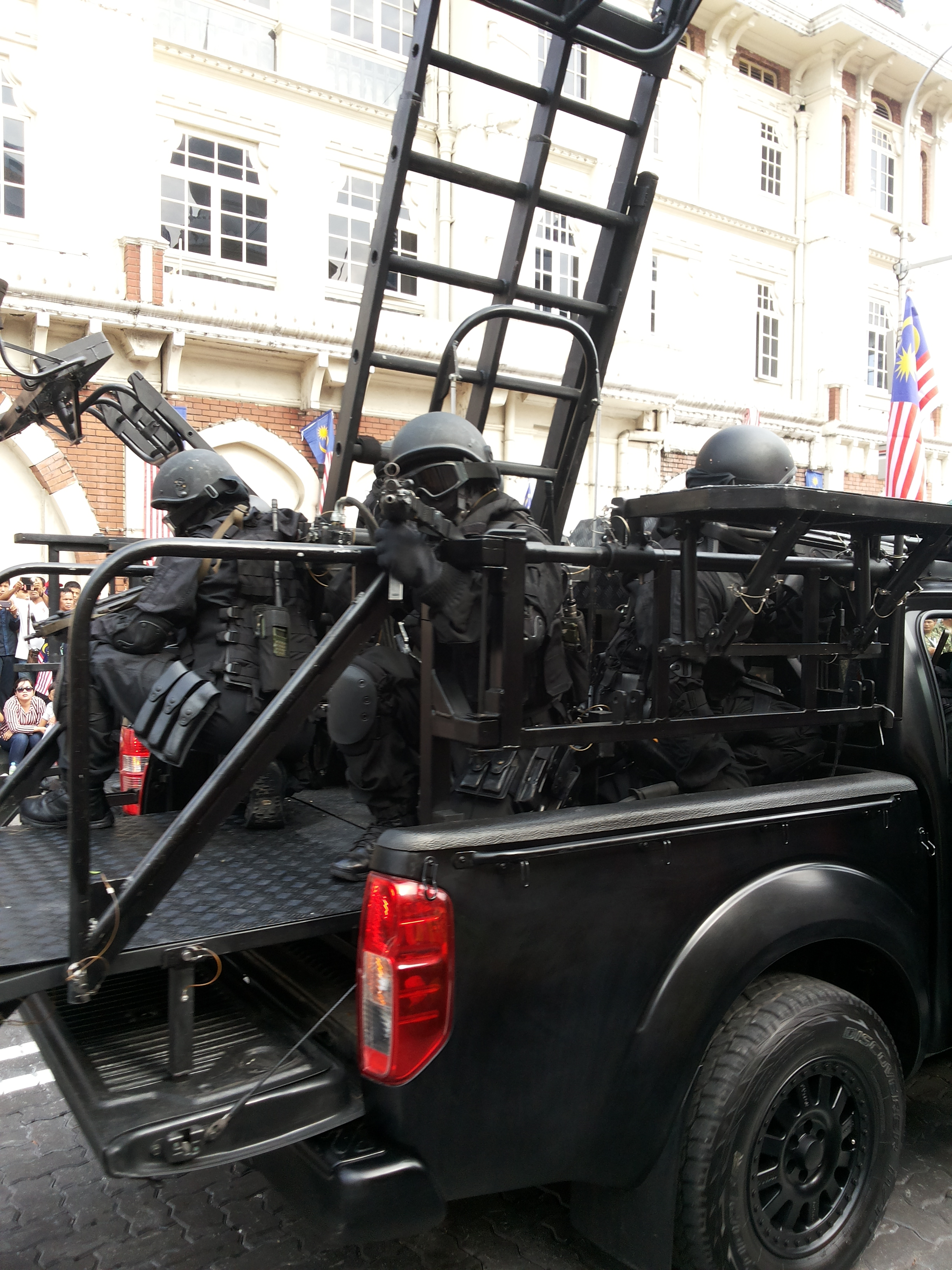
The Gerak Khas with HK MP5A3 in the Rapid Intervention Vehicle during the National Day Parade of 2014

=== Special Warfare Training Centre ===
The Special Warfare Training Centre (abbr.: SWTC; Malay: Pusat Latihan Peperangan Khas) was officially established on 1 August 1976. Prior to its formation, the 1st Malaysian Special Service Regiment held primary responsibility for commando training. The creation of the SWTC allowed for the centralisation and systematisation of special operations instruction.

While the centre currently operates outside the direct command of the 21st Special Service Group, it maintains a close functional relationship with the 21st and 22nd Commando Regiments and the 11th Special Service Regiment, which provide both personnel and subject-matter expertise. The centre is tasked with several core mandates: (Note: In 1995, the SWTC was placed under the Malaysian Army Training and Doctrine Command.)

- Training basic commando candidates for the Army, Navy, and Air Force.
- Providing advanced special operations and supervisor-level instruction for the MAF.
- Conducting unit-level evaluation tests and doctrinal research into unconventional warfare.
- Developing qualified instructors for specialised assignments within the special forces community.

=== Gerak Khas Selection ===
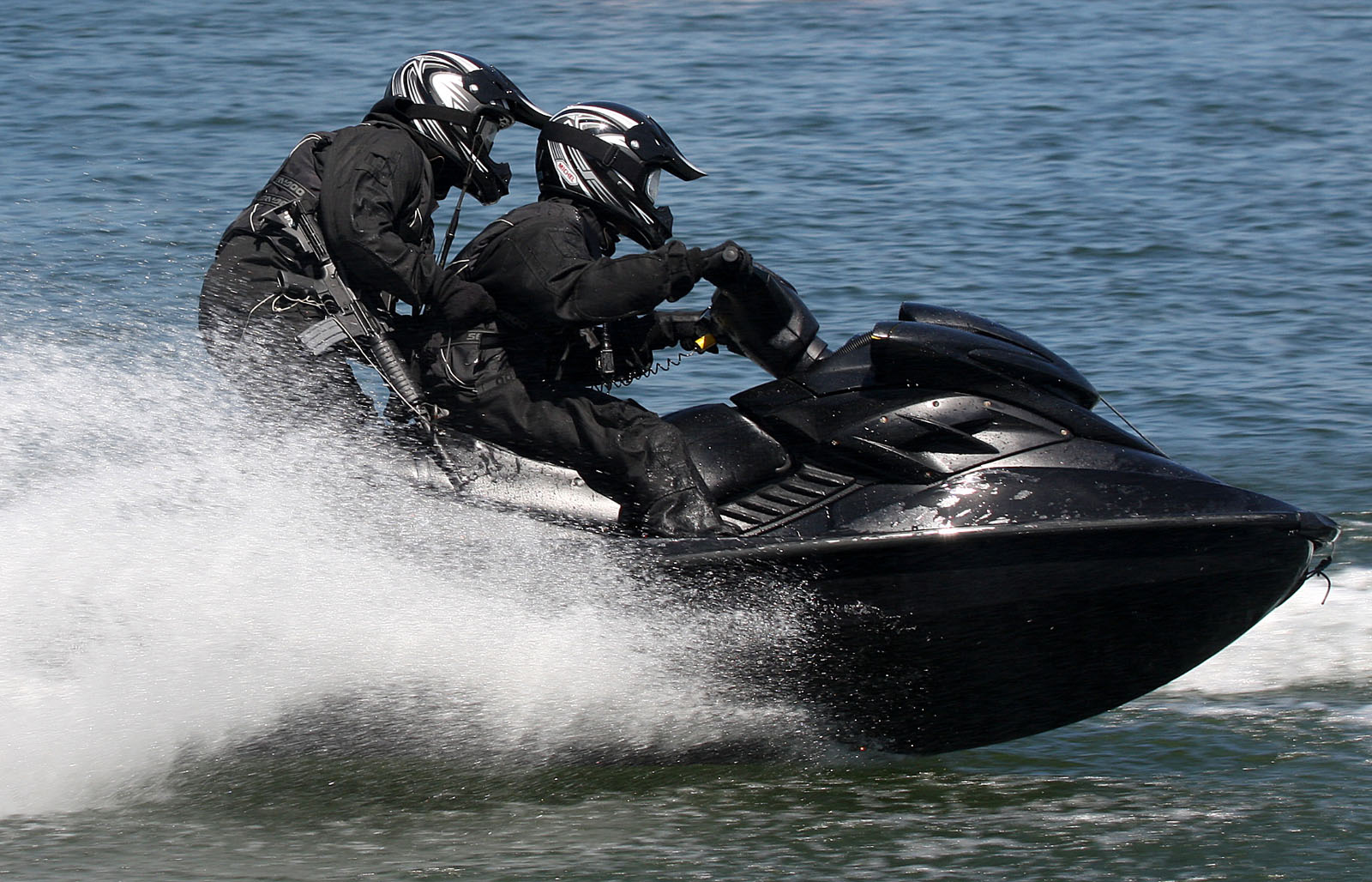
Two commandos of Gerak Khas using jet ski during a demo at Banding Lake, Perak. One of them is armed with a Colt M4A1 assault rifle.

The selection and training pipeline for Gerak Khas is conducted three times annually and is open to both officers and other ranks. Historically, candidates were required to serve at least one year within a conventional military unit before volunteering. Since the early 2020s, this policy has been modified to allow high-performing recruits to be identified during initial recruit training. However, these candidates must still complete their basic military training before entering the selection pipeline.

The process is divided into three primary stages: the Preparatory Course, the Basic Commando Course, and Continuation Training.

==== Preparatory Course (4 weeks) ====
Known in Malay as Pemanasan Kursus Asas Komando (lit. 'Warm-up for the Basic Commando Course'), this 30-day orientation phase focuses on physical conditioning and mental resilience. While the environment is less restrictive than the subsequent phases, candidates must pass rigorous fitness and swimming assessments to qualify for the full Basic Commando Course.

==== Basic Commando Course (12 weeks) ====
The Kursus Asas Komando is held at Camp Sungai Udang, Malacca. Originally a 24-week programme in the 1970s, it was streamlined to 12 weeks during the 1980s and is currently comparable in intensity to a condensed version of the pre-2000 United Kingdom Special Forces selection.

The course is divided into five distinct phases. While primarily for the MAF, it is also attended by members of the Johor Military Forces and personnel from partner nations, including Brunei, the Maldives, and Sri Lanka. (Note: Held three times a year—more frequently than commando schools in other branches, which conduct courses twice annually—the Basic Commando Course at the Malaysian Army Special Warfare Training Centre is also open to Special Forces candidates from other military branches. However, upon graduation, these commandos return to their respective branches to serve in their own Special Forces units.)

==== Graduation ====
Following the successful completion of the final phase, trainees receive a week of rest prior to the green beret presentation ceremony. The graduation typically includes a beach assault demonstration for invited dignitaries and family members. Graduates are awarded the green beret, a light blue lanyard, and a Fairbairn–Sykes fighting knife.

=== Advanced training ===
Qualified commandos may proceed to advanced training, which is provided up to supervisor level at the SWTC. Exceptional personnel may also be selected for overseas specialist schools. Advanced curricula include:

- Sniper
- Mountaineering
- Small unit patrol
- Close-quarters combat
- Parachuting
- High-altitude military parachuting
- Pathfinder
- Parachute rigger
- Small boat operations
- Underwater diving
- Combat swimmer
- Underwater demolition

== Expansions ==
The unit underwent significant expansion during the late 1970s and 1980s. The 2nd Malaysian Special Service Regiment (present-day 22nd Commando Regiment) was established on 1 January 1977 at Camp Sungai Udang, Malacca. By 4 April 1980, a dedicated Special Forces Directorate was formed within the Ministry of Defence, followed by the establishment of the Malaysian Special Service Command headquarters at Camp Imphal, Kuala Lumpur. This period also saw the integration of various combat and service support units into the special forces structure.

The nomenclature of the units evolved alongside these structural changes. The 1st and 2nd Special Service Regiments were initially redesignated as the 21st and 22nd Para Commando Regiments. On 1 April 1981, the 11th and 12th Special Service Regiments were raised to provide additional support. However, the 12th Regiment was soon disbanded during a broader army realignment, with its personnel redistributed to other combat units. Following this, the "Para Commando" designation was simplified to "Commando Regiment". By the late 1980s, the units were formalised into their current designations: the 11th Special Service Regiments, the 21st Commando Regiment, and the 22nd Commando Regiment.

Due to the expansion of the Malaysian Armed Forces and the increasing technical requirements of special operations, Camp Sungai Udang was deemed insufficient for continued growth. The site faced spatial constraints and was increasingly encroached upon by civilian infrastructure and industrial developments, including a major oil refinery, which posed security and logistical challenges.

As part of a strategic relocation, the 21st Special Service Group—along with the Royal Malaysian Navy's Naval Special Forces—began transitioning to a new dedicated special operations base at Camp Sri Iskandar in Mersing. Positioned on the eastern coast of the peninsula, the Mersing base offers direct access to the South China Sea, providing a more suitable environment for maritime and amphibious training compared to the congested shipping lanes of the Straits of Malacca.

Under the leadership of officers such as Lieutenant Colonel Borhan Ahmad, who served as the first administrator of the Special Services Group and later as the Commandant of the Special Warfare Training Centre, the unit enhanced its professional standards through international engagement. Gerak Khas initiated joint training programmes and exchange exercises with partners including the United Kingdom, New Zealand, Australia, and the United States. These collaborations were designed to modernise unit doctrine and provide personnel with experience in diverse operational environments.

== Uniforms, insignia, and identity ==
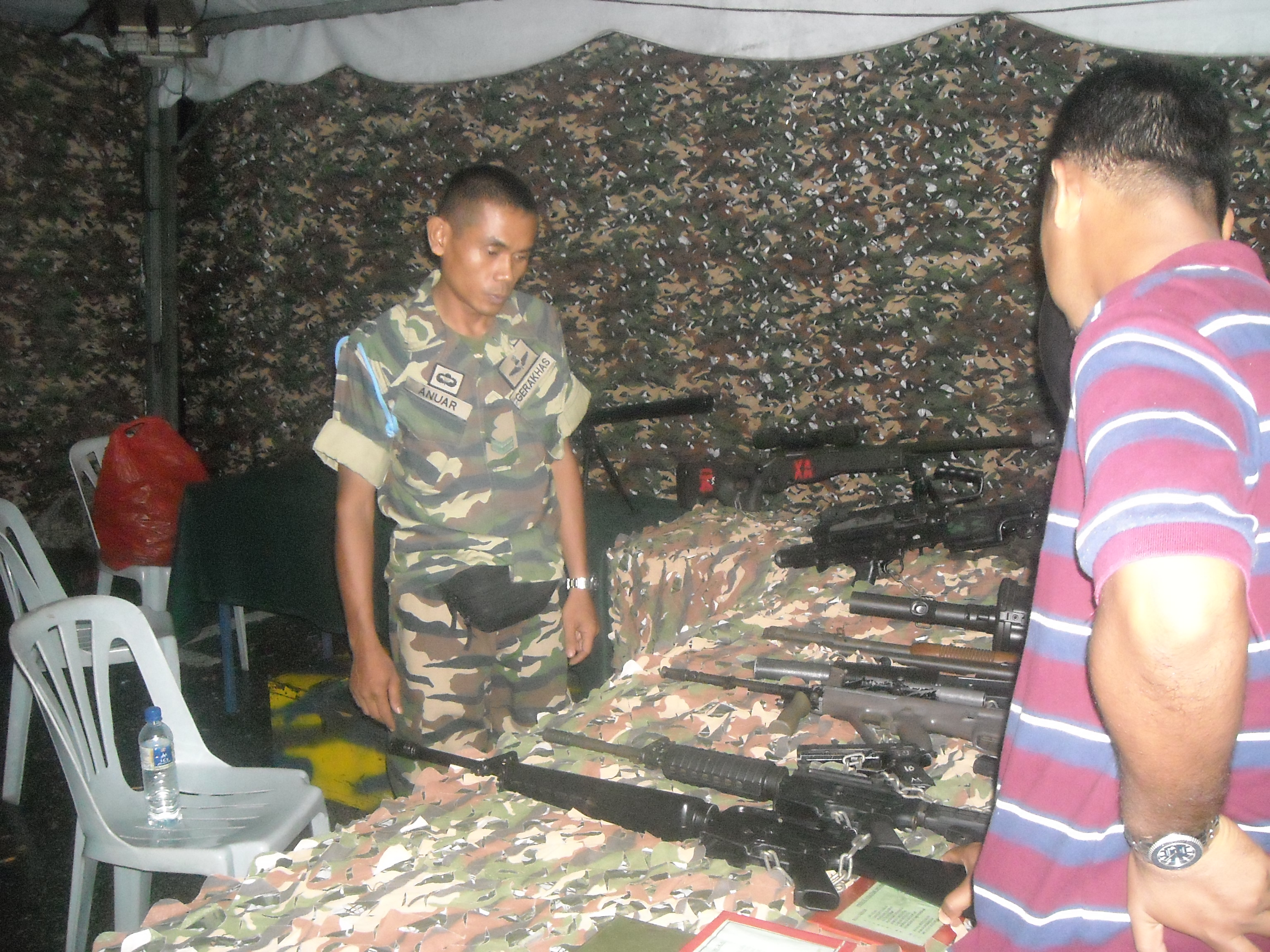
A Gerak Khas corporal serves visitors at a weapon booth. Take note of the light blue lanyard, the green chevron rank, and the sleeve folding style.

Gerak Khas personnel wear the standard combat uniforms issued to the Malaysian Army. Historically, this included the British-influenced brushstroke pattern from the early 1969 until 1994, followed by the "Tiger Stripe" (Harimau Belang) pattern used between 1994 and 2013. Since 2013, the unit has utilised the standard-issue digital camouflage pattern.

Despite the use of standard combat dress, Gerak Khas is distinguished by several specific items of insignia and dress traditions, including the green beret, the Harimau Berjuang cap badge, a light blue lanyard, and the Gerakhas shoulder tab.

The distinctive elements of the uniform are detailed as follows:

=== Green beret and 'Harimau Berjuang' cap badge ===
The Harimau Beruang cap badge

The green beret is the primary international symbol of commando status. Gerak Khas follows the Royal Marines' tradition of positioning the cap badge on the left side of the beret, positioned between the eyebrow and ear (temple). This style was adopted from Royal Marines snipers during the communist insurgency and remains a distinguishing feature of the unit.

The Harimau Berjuang (lit. 'Fighting Tiger') cap badge depicts a roaring tiger behind a commando dagger, framed by an anchor rope with a scroll bearing the motto Cepat dan Cergas (lit. 'Fast and Agile'). The current gold-coloured variant replaced a silver version in the 2010s. The original 1970 design was created by members of the 1st Malaysian Special Service Regiment (1 MSSR) and was informally known as the "Laughing Tiger". (Note: The design was inspired by the "Chap Harimau" (Tiger Brand) cement logo, which was commonly seen around the camp during its renovation.) This early iteration used the Za'aba spelling system, with the motto rendered as Chepat dan Chergas. (Note: The older Za'aba spelling system was gradually phased out after 1972.)

=== Caribbean-blue (Light blue) lanyard ===
Gerak Khas commandos wear a lanyard in a distinctive shade of Caribbean blue. This item is a mark of honour inherited from the unit's founders and original instructors, the 40 Commando, Royal Marines. The tradition was established in 1965 when 40 Commando RM oversaw the training of the MSSU.

Today, the Caribbean blue lanyard is a mandatory component of the uniform for all personnel who successfully qualify at the Special Warfare Training Centre. It serves as a visual link to the unit's historical lineage and its foundational ties to British commando traditions.

=== 'GERAKHAS' shoulder flash ===
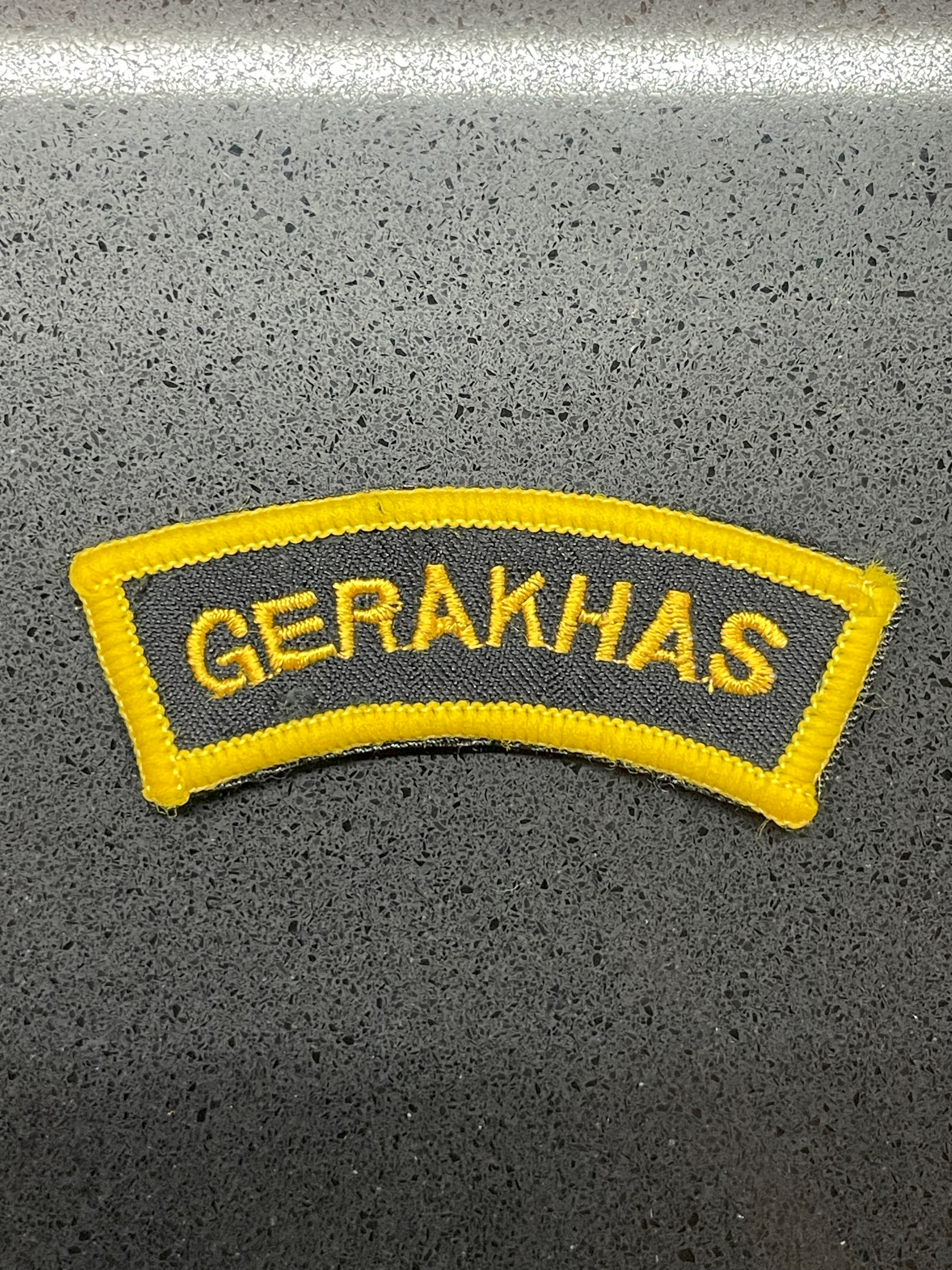
'GERAKHAS' Shoulder Flash

Personnel wear a gold-on-black GERAKHAS shoulder flash on the left sleeve. Similar in function to the United States Army Special Forces Tab, it denotes the wearer's qualification as a special forces operative.

=== Rank insignia and uniform styling ===
Unlike the black inverted chevrons used by regular army units, other ranks (ORs) in Gerak Khas wear green inverted chevrons on their No. 5 combat dress. Furthermore, the unit maintains a unique method of folding uniform sleeves, traditionally referred to as Lipatan Gaya Samseng (lit. 'Thug-style fold'). This style involves rolling the sleeves higher than the standard army regulation to reveal the inner fabric of the uniform, a practice influenced by the Royal Marines' No. 3B Summer Dress and Special Air Service (SAS) customs during the 1968–1989 insurgency.

=== Commando dagger ===
The Fairbairn–Sykes fighting knife is presented to all graduates of the commando course alongside the green beret and lanyard. It serves as both a functional tool and a ceremonial item, worn on the left side of the belt during formal parades. Throughout the unit's history, the daggers have been sourced from several notable manufacturers:

- William Rodgers (Sheffield, England): 1960s–1990s
- Carl Schlieper (Germany): 1990s–2000s
- John Nowill & Sons (Sheffield, England): 2000s–present

== Equipment ==
As an elite unit, there is a broad range of various weapons used by the 21 SSG. The known weapons used by the unit, include handguns, shotguns, submachine guns, assault rifles, machine-guns, sniper rifles, grenade launchers and anti-tanks, are:

Name	Type	Origin	Notes
Beretta 92FS	Semi-automatic pistol	(Italy)	
Colt M1911A1	Semi-automatic pistol	(United States)	
Glock 17	Semi-automatic pistol	(Austria)	
SIG Sauer P226	Semi-automatic pistol	(Switzerland)	
Benelli M1014	Shotgun	(Italy)	
Franchi SPAS-12	Shotgun	(Italy)	
Remington 870 MCS	Shotgun	(United States)	
Heckler & Koch MP5A3 / MP5K-A4 / MP5SD3	SMG	(Germany)	Fitted with various different optics and accessories.
Colt M4A1 Carbine	Assault-rifle	(United States)	Fitted with the M203 grenade launcher, Brügger & Thomet Rotex V suppressor, FAB NFR EX rails, Steiner OTAL-A laser designators, MARS sight and various European-made accessories, similar to SOPMOD accessories.
SIG SG 553LB / SB	Assault-rifle	(Switzerland)	Fitted with the Brügger & Thomet suppressor and Aimpoint CompM4 red-dot optics.
Steyr AUG	Assault-rifle	(Austria)	
Accuracy International Arctic Warfare	Sniper-rifle	(United Kingdom)	
TRG-22	Sniper-rifle	(Finland)	
Barrett M95	Anti-material sniper-rifle	(United States)	
Harris Gun Works M-96	Anti-material sniper-rifle	(United States)	
Heckler & Koch MSG-90A1	DMR	(Germany)	
FN Minimi Mk.II	LMG	(Belgium)	
RPK-74	LMG	(Russia)	
M60E3 GPMG	GPMG	(United States)	
M79	Grenade launcher	(United States)	
M203A1/A2 Grenade Launcher	Grenade launcher	(United States)	
AT4	Anti-tank weapon	(Sweden)	
M72 LAW	Anti-tank weapon	(Norway)	
NLAW	Anti-tank guided missile	(United Kingdom)	

== Deployments and missions ==
=== Indonesia–Malaysia Confrontation (1963–1966) ===
During the Indonesia–Malaysia Confrontation, the Gerak Khas, which was then known as the Malaysian Special Service Unit (MSSU), was established in 1965 to strengthen Malaysia's defence against incursions by Indonesian forces.

The first operational deployment of the MSSU took place in September 1965 during Operation Khas, which formed part of Operation Claret. This operation followed earlier engagements such as the Tebedu Incident in April 1963 and the Battle of Tawau. It was led by British forces and involved personnel from the 22nd Special Air Service Regiment (22 SAS), No. 2 Special Boat Section (now the Special Boat Service), 40 Commando Royal Marines, and the MSSU.

These forces were deployed to Sebatik Island, Tawau, and Semporna, located near the Indonesia–Malaysia border. Their mission was to reinforce the existing defensive line, provide support to forward units, conduct long-range reconnaissance patrols in jungle terrain along the border, and repel Indonesian troops attempting to cross into Malaysian territory by land or sea.

=== 13 May Incident (1969) ===
During the racial riots of May 1969, the MSSU was tasked with securing the Camp Mindef (Kem Kementah) in Kuala Lumpur from potential attacks. Some commandos also collaborated with the Malaysian Police Special Branch, the country's domestic intelligence agency, to apprehend gang leaders and triad members who were fuelling racial tensions behind the scenes.

=== Communist Insurgency (1968–1989) ===
Throughout the communist insurgency, Gerak Khas commandos engaged in counterinsurgency operations, conducting jungle warfare missions against the Malayan Communist Party (MCP) insurgents.

=== Somalia (1993–1995) ===
Malaysia joined the United Nations Operation in Somalia II (UNOSOM II) in 1993, with Gerak Khas commandos assigned as the Quick Reaction Force for the region under Malaysian command.

That same year, Gerak Khas took part in the rescue operations during the infamous Battle of Mogadishu, working alongside the Royal Malay Regiment and the Pakistan Army. Their mission was to extract trapped U.S. Army Rangers and Delta Force operatives amid fierce combat against warlord Mohamed Farah Aidid's forces. One Malaysian soldier, Lance Corporal Mat Aznan Awang of the Royal Malay Regiment, was killed, and several others were wounded during the operation.

In 1994, two Malaysian soldiers were killed in action when their vehicle was ambushed by militants during an intelligence-gathering mission led by the Italian peacekeeping force. The fallen soldiers were Staff Sergeant Azman Mohamad Tahir of the 21st Commando Regiment and Corporal Gani Binjoi of the Royal Ranger Regiment.

=== Bosnia and Herzegovina (1993–1996) ===
Gerak Khas commandos, mainly from the 11th Special Service Regiment, were deployed to Bosnia and Herzegovina as part of the UN Protection Force (UNPROFOR) from 1993 to 1995 and later the Implementation Force (IFOR) from 1995 to 1996. Malaysia was the only Muslim country to deploy special forces as part of its peacekeeping contingent. These commandos were frequently called upon to support peacekeeping operations, particularly in high-risk areas such as Sniper Alley.

=== 16th Commonwealth Games (1998) ===
During the 1998 Commonwealth Games in Kuala Lumpur, Gerak Khas commandos from the 21st Special Service Group (21 SSG) were deployed alongside the Pasukan Gerakan Khas (PGK), the Police Special Operations Command. Their role was to provide security and stand by for hostage rescue operations if necessary.

=== Sauk Siege (2000) ===
Gerak Khas commandos from the 22nd Commando Regiment (22 Cdo) were deployed to Bukit Jenalik, Sauk, near Kuala Kangsar, Perak, to capture 32 Al-Ma'unah militants who had fortified a hill after raiding and stealing weapons from a military camp in Gerik. The operation, codenamed Operation 304, aimed to neutralise the threat and rescue hostages.

During the standoff, two Special Actions Unit police personnel—Sergeant Mohd Shah Ahmad and Detective Corporal Sagadevan Rajoo—along with a civilian, Jaafar Puteh, were taken hostage by the militants. As the operation unfolded, Corporal Matthew anak Medan, a Gerak Khas commando from 22 Cdo, was captured while conducting reconnaissance. He was tortured and later executed after refusing to comply with the militants' demands. Detective Corporal Sagadevan was also killed before the remaining hostages were successfully rescued.

Meanwhile, the 11th Special Service Regiment was deployed to oversee negotiations between the militants and Lieutenant General Zaini Mohamad Said and Assistant Superintendent Abdul Razak Mohd Yusof, who represented the Malaysian government. The standoff ended when the militants surrendered to Malaysian authorities.

=== Timor-Leste (2006) ===
Gerak Khas, under the 21 SSG, was deployed alongside the 10th Parachute Brigade (10 PARA) and the Royal Malaysian Police's PGK as part of Operation Astute, an Australian-led peacekeeping mission to stabilise Timor-Leste.

=== Genting Sempah Incident (2007) ===
In July 2007, Gerak Khas commandos from 22 Cdo, then specialising in mountain warfare, collaborated with the 10 PARA BDE, RMAF Special Forces (PASKAU), PGK, and other Malaysian emergency response units in a search-and-rescue (SAR) operation. The mission aimed to locate six missing Royal Malaysian Air Force (RMAF) crew members after a Sikorsky S-61A-4 Nuri helicopter crashed near Genting Sempah in the Genting Highlands.

On 17 July 2007, the wreckage was discovered approximately 5 kilometres (3.1 mi) from the reported crash site. Tragically, all six crew members were found deceased inside the cabin.

=== MALCON–UNIFIL (2007–Ongoing) ===
Malaysia has been deploying peacekeeping contingents to Lebanon as part of the United Nations Interim Force in Lebanon (MALCON-UNIFIL) since 2007. Gerak Khas commandos from 21 SSG have been deployed alongside 10 PARA, the Naval Special Forces (PASKAL), and PASKAU to serve in peacekeeping operations as part of the Quick Reaction Forces (QRF).

=== MALCON–ISAF (2010–2014) ===
Gerak Khas, along with PASKAU, 10 PARA, and PASKAL, was deployed as part of Malaysia's contingent (MALCON) under the International Security Assistance Force (ISAF) in Afghanistan since 2010. Their mission primarily involved administrative support and humanitarian aid in the Bamiyan District, in coordination with the New Zealand Defence Force.

=== Lahad Datu Standoff (2013) ===
Gerak Khas was mobilised to Lahad Datu, Sabah, during the 2013 standoff against armed Sulu militants. Alongside other Malaysian Special Forces units, they played a crucial role in tracking, engaging, and neutralising the insurgents.

== Died in the line of duty ==
Rank	Name	Unit	YoD	Circumstances
Trooper	Rusli Buang SP	1st Malaysian Special Service Regiment (now 21st Commando Regiment)	1971	He was killed in action (KIA) during a military operation in Chemor, Perak. In recognition of his bravery, he was posthumously awarded the nation's highest gallantry honour, the Grand Knight of Valour (SP), in 1972.
Trooper	Ali	1st Malaysian Special Service Regiment	1974	He was KIA during a military operation in Sarawak.
Lance Corporal	Saimon Tarikat		1983	He was KIA during a military operation in Kuala Kelawang, Negeri Sembilan
Lieutenant Colonel	Ahmad Abdul Rashid PGB	22nd Para Commando Regiment (now 22nd Commando Regiment)	1985	He died in a traffic accident while returning to Camp Erskine from Camp Sungai Udang after attending a routine meeting with the Malaysian Army Special Forces leadership. At the time, he was the commanding officer of the 22nd Para Commando Regiment.
Staff Sergeant	Azman Mohd Tahir	21st Commando Regiment	1994	He and Corporal Gani Binjoi of the Royal Ranger Regiment were KIA during an intelligence-gathering mission led by the Italian peacekeeping force under the UNOSOM II mission in Somalia. Their vehicle was ambushed at the KM4 roundabout in Mogadishu.
Corporal	Mathew Medan PGB	22nd Commando Regiment	2000	He was KIA during Operation 304 in Sauk, Perak. Posthumously promoted to sergeant, he was awarded the nation's second-highest gallantry honour, the Star of the Commander of Valour (PGB).
Corporal	Supin Ghani	21st Commando Regiment	2012	He died during a parachuting exercise at the Kubu Gajah forest reserve in Sungai Buloh, Selangor. On 5 November 2012, he was among a group of 23 Gerak Khas commandos participating in a covert night-time jungle parachute training operation. After failing to report to the designated checkpoint, a search and rescue mission was launched by the armed forces. His body was discovered two days later on 7 November 2012 in a nearby rubber estate, with investigations revealing that his parachute had failed to deploy fully during the descent.
Major	Zahir Armaya	11th Special Service Regiment	2019	He was killed during weapon demonstration in Kota Kinabalu.
Lance Corporal	Edrin Baintim	22nd Commando Regiment	2023	He was drowned during combat diver training after going missing near Undan Island, Malacca. His body was discovered 12 days later near Tanjung Sepat, Selangor, approximately 90 kilometres (49 nmi) from where he was last seen.
Lance Corporal	Mohd Afandi Jahwin	21st Commando Regiment	2024	He was drowned due to a headwater surge while on a nine-man patrol along a river in Banding, Perak, near the Malaysia-Thailand border. The patrol, consisting of commandos from various units within the 21st Special Service Group, was caught in the sudden surge while patrolling near Sungai Merah (lit. 'Merah River'). He and another commando, Lance Corporal Ahmad Zulhilmi Ahmad Tarmizi from the 22nd Commando Regiment, were swept away by the strong currents. His body was later found 3 kilometres (1.9 mi) from where he was last seen, while Ahmad Zulhilmi remains missing.
Corporal	Mohd Haswansir Julnasir	22nd Commando Regiment	2025	According to initial reports, Corporal Mohd Haswansir Julnasir of the 22nd Commando Regiment was reported missing and presumed drowned during a combat diver training exercise near Kuantan Port on 3 July 2025. At approximately 1215 hours, he and three other commandos were conducting a descent to the seabed using SCUBA gear while following a guide rope. However, only the three other divers resurfaced, and Corporal Haswansir failed to return to the surface. A search and rescue (SAR) operation was immediately initiated, but efforts to locate him were unsuccessful. His body was subsequently recovered on 5 July, lodged against a stone breakwater approximately 300 metres (980 ft) from his last known position.

== Notable members ==
Many Gerak Khas commandos have received decorations for bravery and gallantry. Aside from that, some Gerak Khas commandos have done many notable things that have etched their names in history.

- Ahmad Abdul Rashid PGB – Ahmad bin Abdul Rashid (Service number: 410336) was awarded the Star of the Commander of Valour (Malay: Panglima Gagah Berani — PGB), Malaysia's second highest valour award, in 1975 for his role in Operation Murai in 1974. Then a captain, he was the first officer commanding of the Pasukan Khas Perisikan Tempur (Combat Intelligence Special Forces), the predecessor of the 91st Intelligence Operations Group, and led a raid on a communist guerrilla camp in Karak, Pahang. In 1985, while serving as commander of the 22nd Para Commando Regiment (now the 22nd Commando Regiment) with the rank of lieutenant colonel, he died in a traffic accident while returning to Camp Erskine from Camp Sungai Udang.
- Ahmed Abdul Rahman – Ahmed is one of 20 Malaysians who took part in an expedition that made Malaysia the first Asian country to perform a free-fall parachute jump at the North Pole. On 21 April 1998, he and 19 other skydivers, mostly commandos from the Malaysian Armed Forces and the Royal Malaysia Police, jumped out of a plane with a Proton Wira. Gerak Khas was represented by only Ahmed Abdul Rahman (Lieutenant at the time) and Maznan Mat Isa. The expedition is a collaboration between the Malaysian Armed Forces, the Royal Malaysia Police, and a Proton-sponsored adventure club. There is one female skydiver who is a mother of five children, and the youngest skydiver is 21 years old.
- Md Ali Ahmad PGB – Md. Ali bin Ahmad (Service number: 23852) was awarded the PGB in 1974 at the age of 23 for his bravery during Operation Gonzales in Perak, making him the youngest PGB recipient in history. Then a Trooper (the official rank designation for Private in 21 SSG), he received the honour alongside his teammate, Corporal Zaki Nordin. In 1977, he transferred to the Special Investigation Branch of the Royal Military Police Corps, where he served until his retirement in 1991 as a staff sergeant.
- Baharin Abd Jalil PGB – Baharin bin Abd Jalil (Service number: 410560) is one of the PGB recipients. He was awarded the PGB in 1971 for his role in Operation Hentam. He later became a member of Gerak Khas. He was a Major when he retired from the military.
- Borhan Ahmad – He is the only commando in the Malaysian Armed Forces to have attained the highest professional position. He was appointed the 12th chief of Defence Forces on 1 January 1994. He retired from the military with the rank of general in 1995.
- Clarence Tan – Tan is a Singapore army officer who founded the Singapore Armed Forces Commando Formation. In 1960, he volunteered for the Singapore Military Force (the predecessor of the Singapore Armed Forces) and was selected to attend the Officer Cadet Course at Malaysia's Royal Military College, where he was commissioned to second lieutenant. In 1965, he went through commando training with the Royal Marines and joined the Malaysian Special Service Unit. He was a member of the MSSU until 1969, when he was approached by the director of the Singapore Armed Forces Training Institute about forming a commando unit in the Singapore Armed Forces. He was appointed as the first commanding officer of the Singaporean 1st Commando Battalion, but due to slow recruitment to the new commando unit, (Note: At the time, the Singaporean Army was primarily composed of National Service conscripts, who preferred assignments in armour and artillery regiments, making it difficult for the 1st Commando Battalion to recruit new members.) he was temporarily reassigned to the Malaysian Special Service Regiment, where he served in Sabah and Taiping, Perak during Malaysia's Communist insurgency. He returned to the Singapore Armed Forces in 1974 and has remained there ever since. In 1992, he retired from the military with the rank of lieutenant colonel.
- Mahmor Said PGB – Mahmor bin Said (Service number: 14812) is a recipient of the PGB. He received the PGB for his participation in a military operation in Sarawak. He was a Warrant Officer Class II when he retired from the military.
- Mathew Medan PGB – Mathew anak Medan received the PGB posthumously in 2002. During the Al-Mau'nah armed rebellion, he was a member of the 22nd Commando Regiment reconnaissance team at Sauk. While gathering intelligence, he was caught by a member of the rebel forces. Mathew was tortured after his identity was revealed, including being shot at his feet and hanging upside down from a tree before being killed. The rebels, on the other hand, lie to the government, claiming that Mathew has been taken hostage rather than killed. Posthumously, he was promoted to the rank of sergeant.
- Maznan Mat Isa – Maznan is one of 20 Malaysians who took part in an expedition that made Malaysia the first Asian country to perform a free-fall parachute jump at the North Pole. Gerak Khas was represented by only Ahmed Abdul Rahman and Maznan Mat Isa (Warrant Officer Class II at the time).
- Muit Ahmad PGB – Muit bin Ahmad (Service number: 928133) is a PGB recipient. In 1977, he was awarded the PGB for his participation in a military operation in Sarawak. He left the military in 1986 with the rank of colour sergeant.
- Moorthy Maniam – Moorthy was a member of Malaysia's first ten-man expedition, including M. Magendran, to the summit of Mount Everest in 1997. In 1998, he was involved in a military training accident that left the lower half of his body paralysed. He died in 2005 and was promoted to the rank of sergeant posthumously.
- Rasli Buang SP – Rasli bin Buang (Service number: 19151) was posthumously awarded the Grand Knight of Valour (SP), Malaysia's highest valour award. On 6 July 1971, during a jungle patrol in Chemor, Perak, his team was ambushed by communist insurgents. When two teammates were shot, he rushed to their aid but was fatally shot in the neck while trying to rescue them. His sacrifice and bravery were honoured with the nation's highest military recognition and was posthumously promoted from Trooper to Lance Corporal. (Note: His name is also spelt as Rusli Buang and Rasali Buang in some publications.)
- Sigai Nawan PGB – Sigai anak Nawan (Service number: 901370) is a recipient of the PGB. In 1974, he was awarded the PGB for his 1972 mission in Kanowit, Sarawak. Sigai was a member of 5 Troop, Yankee Squadron, which was stationed at Camp Pagar Ruyong in Sibu, Sarawak, and was on standby as a quick reaction force at the time. His squadron received an emergency call to assist two different units under attack, and his troop was dispatched to one of the locations, Ulu Dap in Kanowit. He was involved in two gunfights there and managed to kill two enemies. He concluded his ten years of service with the rank of corporal.
- Zaini Mohamad Said SP – In the year 2000, an extremist group, Al-Mau'nah, led an armed rebellion to overthrow the government. The Malaysian Armed Forces and Royal Malaysia Police are working together to subdue the rebellion that has made Sauk in Perak its base. Zaini was in charge of the military part. The rebel leader, Amin, desired to meet with the commanders of both military and law enforcement forces, so Zaini and Abdul Razak Mohd Yusof, representing the Royal Malaysia Police, agreed to meet with the rebel leader at Sauk. During the meeting, Amin attempts to shoot Zaini, but Zaini quickly pushes the rifle barrel to the side, causing Amin to instantly kill one of his own men, Halim. Both Zaini and Abdul Razak were awarded the Malaysian highest valour award, the Grand Knight of Valour, for their bravery. He retired from the military in 2001 with the rank of lieutenant general.
- Zaki Nordin PGB – Zaki bin Nordin (Service number: 16075) was a PGB recipient. He and Trooper Md Ali Ahmad were both awarded PGB for the same operation, Operation Gonzales in Perak. He was a sergeant when he retired from the army. He died on 10 March 1984.

== In popular culture ==
Books, televisions and movie.

- 2011: "Beret Hijau" is an RTM TV series about a village boy who aspires to be a commando.
- 2011: "Rejimen Gerak Khas: Pasukan Khusus Tentera Darat Malaysia"' is a book about Gerak Khas history was written by Ahmad Ridzuan Wan Chik.
- 2012: "Menjunjung Bere Hijau" is a book written by retired Army Major Nazar Talib. His life as an officer in the 21st Special Service Group was documented in the book.
- 2013: "Majalah Skot" is a 13-part RTM documentary about the Malaysian Army Corps and Regiments. Episode 11 is about the 21st Special Service Group.
- 2013: "Special Forces: Malaysia GGK" is a History Channel Asia documentary about Gerak Khas Selections.
- 2014: "Beret Hijau Musim 2" is an RTM TV series about the life of the season 1 protagonist in the 11th Special Service Regiment.
- 2015: "Bravo 5" is an action film based on true events about the five-man Gerak Khas reconnaissance patrol during the Second Malayan Emergency.
- 2017: "Asia's Special Forces with Terry Schappert" is a four-part History Channel documentary hosted by Terry Schappert about Malaysian Gerak Khas, the Philippines' Marine Recon, Thailand's Marine Recon, the Philippines' Scout Ranger, the Sri Lankan Long Range Reconnaissance Patrol, and Taiwanese Marine Recon.
- 2024: "Toughest Forces on Earth with Dean Scott, Ryan Bates, and Cameron" is an eight-part Netflix docuseries that explores elite military forces around the world. The Malaysian Gerak Khas is featured in episode 4, showcasing their intense training and operational capabilities. Other episodes highlight elite units from various nations, including the Naval Special Operations Command of the Philippine Navy and the Mexican Special Forces.

== See also ==
- Elite Forces of Malaysia
  - Malaysian Army's 10th Parachute Brigade
  - Royal Malaysian Navy's Naval Special Forces (PASKAL)
  - Royal Malaysian Air Force's RMAF Special Forces (PASKAU)
  - Malaysia Coast Guard's Special Task and Rescue (STAR)
  - Royal Malaysia Police's Pasukan Gerakan Khas
