= Operation Khas =

Commonwealth military operation conducted during the Indonesia–Malaysia Confrontation

- Part of Indonesia–Malaysia confrontation and Operation Claret
Date	September 1964–July 1966
Location	Tawau, Sabah, Malaysia 4.276964650116947°N 117.89263019076655°E
Result	Commonwealth victory

Belligerents
Australia; Malaysia; New Zealand; United Kingdom	Indonesia; Communist Party of Indonesia; North Kalimantan Communist Party

Commanders and leaders
(United Kingdom) George Lea, Director of Borneo Operations; (United Kingdom) John Woodhouse; (Australia) John 'Sandy' Thomas; (Malaysia) Abu Hassan Abdullah; (United Kingdom) J.M. Clutterbuck; (United Kingdom) John Davidson; (New Zealand) John M. McNeill	(Indonesia) Sukarno, President of Indonesia; (Indonesia) Hartono Rekso Dharsono; (Indonesia) Sarwo Edhie Wibowo; Wen Ming Chyuan; Lam Wah Kwai

Units involved
Royal Australian Navy; Royal Navy; Royal New Zealand Navy; 1 Ranger Squadron New Zealand Special Air Service; 22nd Special Air Service Regiment; 40 Commando; Malaysian Special Service Unit; No. 2 Special Boat Section; Special Air Service Regiment	Army Para-Commando Regiment; Commando Operations Corps; North Borneo Liberation Army
- Location within Sabah

Operation Khas (lit. 'Operation Special') was a Commonwealth military operation carried out from September 1964 to July 1966 during the Indonesia–Malaysia Confrontation. The operation took place in the Tawau Division and on the Malaysian side of Sebatik Island, both located in Sabah. It was part of the broader Operation Claret and served as a continuation of the Tebedu Incident, which marked Indonesia's first attempt to launch cross-border attacks into East Malaysia by land.

Unlike conventional offensive campaigns, Operation Khas focused primarily on border security, screening, and blocking operations. Its main objective was to prevent Indonesian forces from infiltrating Sabah via land and sea routes through the Tawau district and to avoid a recurrence of incidents such as the Battle of Tawau.

Importantly, the mission was the first military operation involving the Gerak Khas, then known as the Malaysian Special Service Unit, just four months after its formation in May 1965.

The operation was further supported by naval assets from the Royal Navy, Royal Australian Navy, and Royal New Zealand Navy, which patrolled Malaysian waters along the maritime border with Indonesia.

== Geography ==
Tawau Division and is situated on the eastern side of Sabah, along the Malaysian section of the Indonesia–Malaysia border. The land boundary between Indonesia and Malaysia within the Tawau Division spans approximately 130 kilometres (81 mi), while the maritime border in the Celebes Sea extends for an additional 162 nautical miles (300 km).

The district also encompasses the northern portion of Sebatik Island, which has been divided between Malaysia and Indonesia since the 1915 Boundary Treaty Agreement.

Tawau was originally developed into a military base by Imperial Japanese forces during the Second World War but was abandoned following Japan's surrender. Due to renewed tensions during the Indonesia–Malaysia Confrontation, the former military facilities were reactivated in July 1963, and the 10th Gurkha Rifles, along with the 3rd Battalion, Royal Malay Regiment (3 RMR), were stationed there from that time onwards.

== Background ==
Following the Battle of Plaman Mapu, Indonesian forces shifted to guerrilla-style tactics, conducting small-scale skirmishes targeting government infrastructure, police stations, and military camps in East Malaysia. Due to the effectiveness of Operation Claret, the Malaysia–Commonwealth intelligence network became highly reliable in detecting and disrupting Indonesian incursions. This made it increasingly difficult for Indonesia to mount large-scale raids, resulting in a preference for smaller, covert cross-border missions.

=== Intelligence ===
Operation Claret heavily relied on Human Intelligence (HUMINT) to gather information on Indonesian movements. Informants, primarily from the indigenous Dayak communities in Kalimantan, were recruited to report significant military activity within the Indonesian jungle. This intelligence-gathering network was largely made possible by the Royal Malaysia Police's Border Scouts, who employed local indigenous scouts with familial ties across the border. These relatives served as valuable informers. However, the system was not foolproof—movements involving small, dispersed Indonesian units were sometimes able to evade detection.

=== Strategy ===
During the Indonesia–Malaysia Confrontation, the Malaysia–Commonwealth alliance adopted a comprehensive approach to border security in East Malaysia, employing screening, blocking, and territorial denial operations aimed at restricting Indonesian incursions and maintaining control over critical terrain. To support this objective, an extensive network of ad hoc military bases, police field posts, and forward patrol stations was established along key sections of the Indonesia–Malaysia border, particularly within Tawau Division, which presented both land and maritime challenges—necessitating tailored operational strategies.

Land Border Operations

On the land frontier, a principal army base was established in Tawau in 1963, serving as a forward operating hub for British and Malaysian land forces. In support of Operation Claret and other border control measures, additional Commonwealth units were deployed to the region from 1964 onwards. By 1965, the following units were recorded as present:

- 10th Gurkha Rifles
- 3rd Battalion, Royal Malay Regiment (3 RMR)
- 4th Battalion, Royal Australian Regiment (4 RAR)
- 1st Battalion, Royal New Zealand Infantry Regiment (1 RNZIR)
- Special Air Service Regiment (SASR)
- 1 Ranger Squadron New Zealand Special Air Service (NZSAS)
- 22 Special Air Service Regiment (22 SAS)
- 40 Commando
- No. 2 Special Boat Section (2 SBS)
- Malaysian Special Service Unit (MSSU)

Of these, SASR, NZSAS, 22 SAS, and the MSSU were directly involved in Operation Khas land operations, which focused on deep reconnaissance, intelligence gathering, and small-unit jungle patrols along the densely forested frontier to detect and disrupt Indonesian cross-border movements.

In support of these missions, 40 Commando provided light armoured reconnaissance using Ferret Scout Cars, enhancing ground mobility and force protection during patrol and interdiction tasks.

Maritime Operations

In response to the operational complexities posed by the maritime boundary, the Royal Navy established a forward naval outpost at Wallace Bay on Sebatik Island in September 1964, while the Royal Malaysian Navy concurrently constructed a complementary naval base at Semporna. These two facilities served as the principal staging points for coastal and riverine security operations throughout the duration of the Confrontation.

The Wallace Bay outpost hosted a composite force drawn from 40 Commando and No. 2 Special Boat Section (2 SBS). These elements were collectively designated the Tawau Assault Group, which operated in close coordination with Commonwealth naval forces and received continuous fire support and escort coverage from a frigate- or destroyer-class warship. These ships were provided on a rotational basis by the Royal Navy, Royal Australian Navy, and Royal New Zealand Navy, all of which maintained a persistent offshore presence along the Sabah coast.

In addition to Wallace Bay, elements of the Tawau Assault Group, as well as personnel from SASR, NZSAS, 22 SAS, and MSSU, were rotated through the Semporna naval base. These deployments ensured a rapid response capability across both land and maritime sectors, while also safeguarding key infrastructure and lines of communication at the naval facility itself.

The maritime boundary was further secured through sustained patrols conducted by destroyers, minesweepers, and a variety of light naval craft operating from Semporna. These vessels were tasked with monitoring coastal waters and inland waterways, interdicting infiltration attempts, and maintaining persistent maritime domain awareness throughout the operational theatre.

== Battles ==
The majority of armed engagements during Operation Khas consisted of minor guerrilla skirmishes and intermittent cross-border fire. However, the most significant Indonesian incursion occurred on 28 June 1965, when two large Indonesian formations were observed advancing toward the Malaysian side of Sebatik Island. These elements originated from the Commando Operations Corps (KKO) base located on the Indonesian side of Sebatik Island and from an additional base on Nunukan Island.

The movement appeared to be an organised attempt to assault Malaysian–Commonwealth outposts at Wallace Bay and potentially to seize control of the entire island. In response, the Royal Australian Navy frigate HMAS Yarra, then on station off Wallace Bay, conducted a series of shore bombardments against the advancing Indonesian troops, forcing their withdrawal.

Indonesian forces launched further attempts on 5 July and again on 10 July 1965, both of which were similarly repelled by naval gunfire from Yarra. Following these three repulsed incursions, no further large-scale Indonesian raids were attempted against Wallace Bay. According to official reports, Yarra fired a total of 70 rounds in shore bombardment over the course of the three engagements.

== Aftermath ==
Operation Khas concluded in July 1966, following a sustained halt in cross-border attacks by Indonesian forces from Kalimantan into East Malaysia. Although the operation had ended, many of the military bases and facilities established during the Indonesia–Malaysia Confrontation remained in use by Commonwealth armed forces—with the exception of the Wallace Bay base, which was decommissioned.

Post-conflict assessments revealed that the primary Indonesian units involved in cross-border incursions into Sabah were the Commando Operations Corps (now known as the Indonesian Marine Corps), the Army Para-Commando Regiment (present-day Kopassus), and the North Borneo Liberation Army (PARAKU) (Note: Alternatively known as the North Kalimantan People's Army.)—the paramilitary wing of the North Kalimantan Communist Party. Indonesian forces often deployed the less trained and poorly equipped PARAKU units to harass Malaysia–Commonwealth positions while reserving more organised and strategic raids for their professional commando forces.

Although hostilities between Indonesia and Malaysia ceased, a new wave of communist insurgency erupted within Malaysia beginning in 1968, lasting until 1989. Nonetheless, diplomatic relations between Malaysia and Indonesia steadily improved in the post-confrontation era, particularly under the leadership of Indonesia's second president, Suharto.
