= 21st Commando Regiment (Malaysia) =

Malaysian Army special operations regiment

- Rejimen ke-21 Komando ريجيمن ك-٢١ كومندو
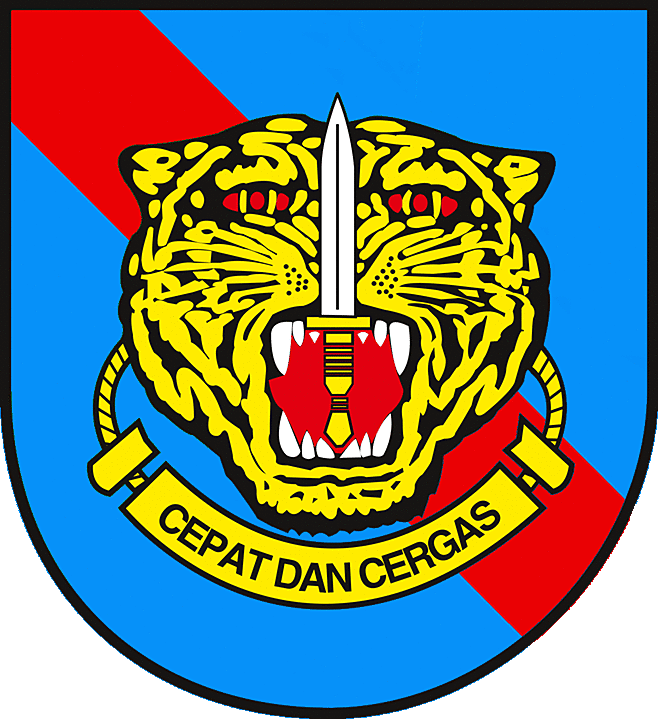
- Founded: 1 August 1970; 56 years ago
- Country: Malaysia
- Branch: Malaysian Army
- Type: Special forces
- Size: 4 squadrons, and 1 headquarters
- Part of: 21st Special Service Group
- Headquarters: Camp Sungai Udang
- Motto: Harimau Satu (The First Tiger)

Commanders
- Current commander: Colonel Razak Akob

The 21st Commando Regiment (Abbr. 21 CDO, Malay: Rejimen ke-21 Komando, stylised as Rejimen 21 Komando — 21 Kdo, Jawi: ريجيمن ك-٢١ كومندو) is a special forces unit of the Malaysian Army. It is one of three regiments under the elite Gerak Khas, alongside the 22nd Commando Regiment and the 11th Special Service Regiment. The regiment is headquartered at Camp Sungai Udang in Malacca.

Originally known as the Malaysian Special Service Regiment, it was later redesignated the 1st Malaysian Special Service Regiment following the formation of a second regiment. The 21 CDO traces its roots back to the Malaysian Special Service Unit—the first special operations task force in the Malaysian Armed Forces. Today, the regiment is a key component of the 21st Special Service Group, continuing its legacy as a cornerstone of Malaysia’s special operations capability.

== History ==
=== Established to replace the Malaysian Special Service Unit ===
The Malaysian Special Service Unit (MSSU) was a special operations task force formed during the Indonesia–Malaysia Confrontation. Although it operated under the authority of the Malaysian Army, its members were drawn from across all branches of the Malaysian Armed Forces—including various army corps and regiments, as well as sailors from the Royal Malaysian Navy. This multi-branch composition created complications, particularly in terms of command structure, as MSSU commandos were still expected to report to their original parent units. (Note: As a task force, the commandos attached to the MSSU are not permanent. Each commando also has their own unit traditions and uniform, which prevents standardisation.)

To resolve these issues, the Malaysian Army established a dedicated special forces regiment—the Malaysian Special Service Regiment (MSSR)—on 1 August 1970. MSSU personnel who wished to continue serving in special operations were required to resign from their original units and voluntarily transfer to the new regiment by 1973.

=== Renamed as the 21st Para Commando Regiment ===
From its formation in 1970, the MSSR served as the sole special operations unit in the Malaysian Armed Forces (MAF) and acted as the central command for all special operations activities. This changed on 1 January 1976, when the 2nd Malaysian Special Service Regiment (2 MSSR) was established, prompting the original MSSR to be renamed the 1st Malaysian Special Service Regiment (1 MSSR).

Later, on 4 April 1980, the Malaysian Army created a new command structure specifically for overseeing special operations—the Malaysian Special Service Command (Malay: Markas Gerak Khas), now known as the 21st Special Service Group. The headquarters was set up at Camp Imphal in Kuala Lumpur, officially separating operational command from the 1 MSSR and solidifying the framework of modern Malaysian special forces.

On 1 April 1981, the 1st Malaysian Special Service Regiment (1 MSSR) was officially renamed the 21st Para Commando Regiment—short for Parachute Commando. At the same time, the 2 MSSR was redesignated as the 22nd Para Commando Regiment. This renaming marked a significant shift in the role and identity of the units, signifying that all commando regiments within the Malaysian Army would now be trained and equipped as airborne forces, capable of parachute insertion and rapid deployment.

=== The 11th Special Service Regiment was separated from the 21st Para Commando Regiment ===
On 1 April 1981, alongside renaming 1 MSSR to the 21st Para Commando Regiment (21 PARA CDO), the Malaysian Army also established a combat intelligence squadron for 21 PARA CDO, known as the 11th Special Service Regiment (11 SSR). However, this unit did not remain under 21 PARA CDO for long. In 1983, the 12th Special Service Regiment, a sister regiment of 11 SSR, was disbanded, and at the same time, 11 SSR was separated from 21 PARA CDO. It became an independent combat intelligence and counter-revolutionary warfare unit reporting directly to the Malaysian Special Service Group (Malay: Gerup Gerak Khas Malaysia; now known as the 21st Special Service Group).

=== Renamed as the 21st Commando Regiment ===
In 1985, the Malaysian Army underwent a major restructuring, which also affected the Malaysian Special Service Group (MSSG) and its subordinate units. The MSSG was renamed the 21st Special Service Group, and the 21st Para Commando Regiment was renamed the 21st Commando Regiment. Similar changes also occurred within the 22nd Para Commando Regiment.

=== Reorganised as a special forces unit specialising in airborne insertion ===
In 2017, the 21st Special Service Group underwent another round of restructuring. As part of this reorganisation, the 22nd Commando Regiment was designated as the specialist unit for amphibious operations, while the 21st Commando Regiment was given the primary role of conducting special operations involving airborne insertion.

Further changes were introduced in March 2025, when the squadrons under the 21 CDO were officially renamed to reflect their specialised capabilities. X-Ray Squadron was renamed Special Operations Squadron 1, Yankee Squadron became Special Operations Squadron 2, and Zulu Squadron was redesignated as the Special Sniper Squadron. This naming convention mirrors that of the 22nd Commando Regiment, which adopted similar squadron titles back in 2017.

== Structures ==
Originally, the 21 CDO had three special operations assault squadrons, one special operations support squadron, and one logistics squadron. Following a restructure in 2017, the support squadrons were abolished, and their functions were absorbed by the other special operations assault squadrons. Today, the 21 CDO comprises the following units:

=== Current squadrons ===
Name	Name (Bahasa Malaysia)	Logo	Original name	Motto
21 CDO Headquarters	Markas 21 Kdo			
Special Operations Squadron 1	Skuadron Operasi Khusus 1		X-Ray 'X' Squadron	Membunuh Terus Membunuh
Special Operations Squadron 2	Skuadron Operasi Khusus 2		Yankee 'Y' Squadron	Maju, Menentang, Membebas
Special Sniper Squadron	Skuadron Sniper Khusus		Zulu 'Z' Squadron	Bertindak Berperang Demi Kejayaan
Logistic Squadron, 21 CDO	Skuadron Logistik 21 Kdo			

=== Family welfare support ===
The 21 CDO's BAKAT oversees the family welfare support for the regiment. The organisation is under the leadership of the spouse of the Commander of 21 CDO, with the commander serving as the patron for this organisation.
