= 22nd Commando Regiment (Malaysia) =

Malaysian Army special operations regiment

- Rejimen ke-22 Komando
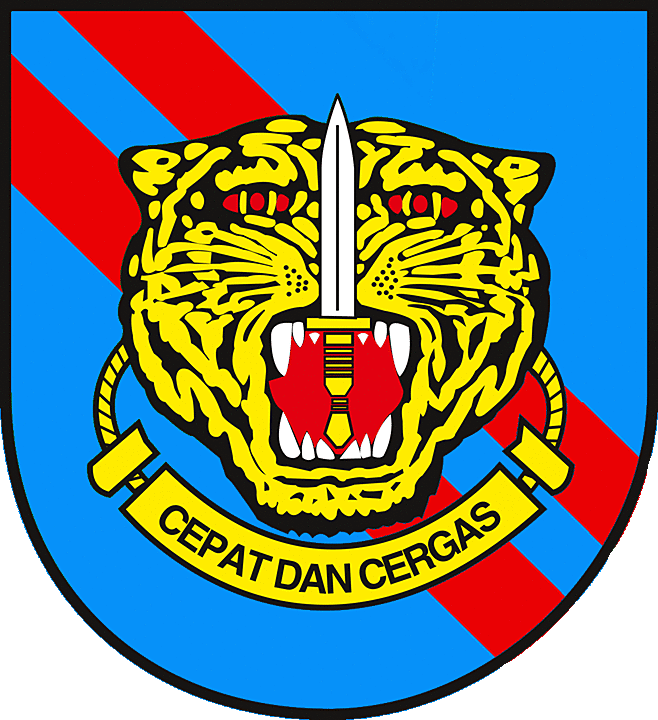
- Founded: 1 January 1976; 50 years ago
- Country: Malaysia
- Branch: Malaysian Army
- Type: Special forces
- Size: 3 squadrons, and 1 headquarters
- Part of: 21st Special Service Group
- Headquarters: Camp Sri Iskandar
- Mottos: Gagah Berani ('Brave and Courageous')
- Anniversaries: 1 January

Commanders
- Commander: Colonel Mohd Musyadi Abdul Mutali
- Assistant commander: Lieutenant Colonel Boselie Christoper Usang
- Command Sergeant Major: Warrant Officer I Mohd Khairul Nizam Sam
- Notable commanders: Ahmad Abdul Rashid PGB

The 22nd Commando Regiment (Abbr.: 22 CDO, Malay: Rejimen ke-22 Komando, stylised as Rejimen 22 Komando — 22 Kdo or unofficially Rejimen 22 Komando (Perahu Khas)), specialised in amphibious operations, is a special forces unit within the Malaysian Army. This regiment is one of the regiments under the Gerak Khas, alongside the 21st Commando Regiment and the 11th Special Service Regiment, with its headquarters located at Camp Sri Iskandar in Johor. Significantly, the 22 CDO serves as one of the combat units within the 21st Special Service Group.

== History ==
=== Established as the 2nd Malaysian Special Service Regiment ===
The 22nd Commando Regiment, initially founded as the 2nd Malaysian Special Service Regiment on 1 January 1976, emerged during the Communist insurgency in Malaysia (1968–1989) at Camp Sungai Udang in Malacca. In the aftermath of the Indonesia-Malaysia confrontation (1963–1966) and subsequent conflicts, the 1st Malaysian Special Service Regiment (now known as the 21st Commando Regiment) faced difficulties countering enemies skilled in guerrilla warfare given their existing capabilities. (Note: The communist guerrillas collaborated with the United Kingdom during World War II. Force 136 agents were sent to train the guerrillas in guerrilla warfare. Alongside other resistance groups, including the communist guerrillas, Force 136 fought against and sabotaged the Japanese Imperial Army in Malaya throughout the war.) As a response, the 2nd Malaysian Special Service Regiment was established to provide additional support and augment their efforts.

Recognising the evolving landscape, on 4 April 1980, the headquarters company of 1st Malaysian Special Service Regiment was restructured and established as the Malaysian Special Service Command (now known as the 21st Special Service Group) at Camp Imphal in Kuala Lumpur. Consequently, all special forces within the Malaysian Army, including the 2nd Malaysian Special Service Regiment, fell under the jurisdiction of the Malaysian Special Service Command.

=== Later named the 22nd Para Commando Regiment ===
On 1 April 1981, the Malaysian Special Service Command underwent a reorganisation and was renamed the Malaysian Special Service Group. Concurrently, all combat units previously under the Malaysian Special Service Command received new designations. Specifically, the 1st Malaysian Special Service Regiment transformed into the 21st Para Commando Regiment, while the 2nd Malaysian Special Service Regiment evolved into the 22nd Para Commando Regiment. This transformation signified a strategic shift, indicating that all special forces within the Malaysian Army would now receive training in airborne operations.

Simultaneously, the Malaysian Intelligence Corps (now known as the Royal Intelligence Corps) established two combat intelligence regiments: the 11th Special Service Regiment and the 12th Special Service Regiment. Initially, these regiments were integrated with both the 21st Para Commando Regiment and the 22nd Para Commando Regiment. However, by 1983, the 12th Special Service Regiment had dissolved from the 22nd Para Commando Regiment. Furthermore, the 11th Special Service Regiment transitioned from its attachment with the 21st Para Commando Regiment to becoming an integral combat unit within the Malaysian Special Service Group.

=== Moved to Camp Erskine and transformed into a mountain warfare-specialised unit ===
In 1983, the 22nd Para Commando Regiment was relocated to Camp Erskine in Kuala Kubu Bharu, Selangor, and simultaneously underwent retraining to specialise in mountain warfare. Camp Erskine, situated at the base of the Titiwangsa Mountain range, was transformed into a mountain warfare school specifically designed for special forces training.

=== Became the 22nd Commando Regiment ===
In 1985, the Malaysian Army underwent a significant organisational transformation. As part of this restructuring, the Malaysian Special Service Group was renamed the 21st Special Service Group. Concurrently, the combat units within the Malaysian Special Service Group also received new designations: the 21st Para Commando Regiment was re-branded as the 21st Commando Regiment, and the 22nd Para Commando Regiment transitioned to become the 22nd Commando Regiment.

=== Moved to Camp Sri Iskandar ===
In 2004, the 22nd Commando Regiment was relocated to the newly constructed Camp Sri Iskandar in Mersing, Johor. During this period, the camp, equipped with state-of-the-art facilities tailored for special forces training, was envisioned as the garrison for two elite special forces units: the 21st Special Service Group from the Malaysian Army and the Naval Special Forces (PASKAL) from the Royal Malaysian Navy. (Note: The Ministry of Defence plans to station a detachment from the Royal Malaysian Navy's Naval Special Forces at Camp Sri Iskandar. Refer to Gerak Khas (Malaysian Army unit)#Expansions for more details) The 22nd Commando Regiment was the inaugural unit to be relocated to this facility. However, as of 2009, the Royal Malaysian Navy had yet to assign a PASKAL detachment to Camp Sri Iskandar. Consequently, the Victor Squadron from the 11th Special Service Regiment, also known as the 11th SSR's Special Boat Squadron, utilised the facilities intended for PASKAL. (Note: There's a jetty within Camp Sri Iskandar designated for use by a unit of the Royal Malaysian Navy's Naval Special Forces.)

=== Reorganised as an amphibious warfare specialised unit ===
In 2009, the Malaysian Army Command restructured the 22nd Commando Regiment to specialise in amphibious warfare and maritime operations. Existing squadrons within the 22nd Commando Regiment underwent retraining specifically tailored for amphibious warfare. Concurrently, the Victor Squadron from the 11th Special Service Regiment was permanently integrated into the 22nd Commando Regiment and formally re-designated as the Special Boat Squadron. Consequently, amphibious insertion capabilities became a prominent strength of the 22nd Commando Regiment.

== Organisation ==
The 22 CDO adopts a structure reminiscent of the British Special Air Service, referring to all its companies as "sabre squadrons". Prior to the 2009 restructure, the 22 CDO comprised five sabre squadrons, aligning with the squadrons of the 21 CDO.

Notably, names like X-ray Alpha Squadron, Yankee Alpha Squadron, and Zulu Alpha Squadron exemplify the designation of an "Alpha" suffix in each squadron within the 22 CDO.

Former squadrons before 2009 restructure:

- X-ray Alpha Squadron (Motto: Memburu Membunuh)
- Yankee Alpha Squadron (Motto: Yakin Menang)
- Zulu Alpha Squadron (Motto: Tegas & Cekal)

However, in 2009, these squadrons were disbanded, and a Combatant Boat Squadron was established in their stead. Additionally, one squadron from the 11th Special Service Regiment was transferred to join the 22 CDO during this restructuring.

=== Current squadrons ===
Unit's name (English)	Unit's name (Bahasa Malaysia)	Logo	Motto	Notes
22 CDO's Headquarters	Markas 22 Kdo			Administration and other tasks
Special Boat Squadron	Skuadron Perahu Khas		Sentiasa Cekal	Originally a part of the 11th Special Service Regiment, it was transferred here in 2009. During its time with the 11th Special Service Regiment, this squadron was modelled after the Boat Troop of the Special Air Service. Trained as frogmen, this squadron acts as the Malaysian Army's equivalent to the US Navy SEALs.
Combatant Boat Squadron	Skuadron Bot Kombatan		Tangkas & Pintas	Also referred to as the Maritime Squadron (Malay: Skuadron Maritim), this unit serves as the Malaysian Army's counterpart to the US Navy Special Warfare Combat Crewmen. The unit equipped with jet skis, RIBs from Sealegs Amphibious Craft, and 11-meter high-performance RIBs from Tornado Boats as of 2021.
Logistics Squadron, 22 CDO	Skuadron Logistik 22 Kdo		Sedia Membantu	Combat service support

=== Family welfare support ===
The family welfare support for the 22nd Commando Regiment (22 CDO) is overseen by the 22 CDO's BAKAT. The spouse of the Commander of 22 CDO leads this organisation, with the commander serving as its patron.
