= Johor Military Forces =

Royal Johor Military Force
- Askar Timbalan Setia Negeri Johor عسكر تيمبلن ستيا نڬري جوهر
- Founded: 11 December 1885; 140 years ago
- Country: Malaysia
- Allegiance: Sultan of Johor
- Type: Private army, Royal guard, Foot guards
- Role: Primary: Protecting HM Sultan of Johor, his royal family and properties.; Secondary: Participating with the Malaysian Armed Forces during an emergency or armed conflict.
- Size: 598
- Garrison/HQ: Sultan Ibrahim Camp, Johor Bahru
- Nicknames: "Sultan's Own Bodyguards" "The Sultan's Troops"
- Patron: Sultan of Johor
- Motto: Taat dengan setia ('Obey faithfully')
- Colours: Unit's: Royal blue and yellow; Beret: Sherwood green
- Anniversaries: 11 May
- Engagements: World War I; Singapore Mutiny; World War II

Commanders
- Commandant: Sultan Ibrahim Ismail, the Sultan of Johor
- Commanding officer: Major General Tunku Ismail Idris, the Crown Prince of Johor
- Second-in-command: Major Ahmad Hamdan Libar

Insignia
- Flag

Aircraft flown
- Helicopter: Sikorsky 76 B

The Royal Johor Military Force (Abbr.: JMF; Malay: Askar Timbalan Setia Negeri Johor — ATSNJ; “Johor State’s Loyal Deputy Army”) (Jawi: عسكر تيمبلن ستيا نڬري جوهر) is an independent military force of the state of Johor and the private royal guard of Sultan of Johor in Malaysia. The JMF is Malaysia's oldest active military unit still in operation and the only military in the Federation that is maintained by a state. The force comes under the control of the Sultan. Its headquarters are located at Sultan Ibrahim Camp, Johor Bahru.

The retention of the army was one of the stipulations in 1946 which Johor made when it participated in the Federation of Malaya. The Ninth Schedule of the Constitution of Malaysia states that the Malaysian federal government is solely responsible for foreign policy and military forces in the country. The JMF will be involved under the Malaysian Armed Forces (MAF) during any kind of emergency and armed conflict as an infantry unit.

== History ==
=== Pre-independence (1886–1957) ===
The JMF was established and raised in 1886 during the reign of the first Sultan of Modern Johor, Sultan Abu Bakar. Johor was the first and only Malay state (the Federated Malay States and the Unfederated Malay States) to have its modern military force. At the time there was no other Malay state with its own army. Its inception was based on the Anglo-Johor Treaty of 1885 signed by Sultan Abu Bakar and Queen Victoria in London, the United Kingdom to uphold peace and protect Johor including Singapore from outside threats then. On the basis of the treaty, Sultan Abu Bakar gave his support to the establishment of a British-controlled police force, namely Pasukan Setia Negeri ('Loyal State Force'), inside Johor. The Johore Constabulary Forces were then established by the Sultan to act as a backup for the British organised police and also to balance the authority given to them. It is later renamed to Timbalan Setia Negeri (TSN; transl. 'Loyal State Deputy').

Initially, the TSN was formed with only 60 Johorean Malays and led by Syed Mohammed Nong Yahya, who was a police officer in the British Police Force. They were tasked to protect the Sultan as bodyguards, and also to work together with the British Police Forces to enforce the law. In the same time, the Sultan also employed 20 Sikh soldiers led by Major Daud Sulaiman as the Istana ('Palace') Guard tasked to protect the royal palaces' surroundings. One year after its establishment, the Sultan upgraded the forces into a military force and changed its name into Angkatan Timbalan Setia Negeri (ATSN; transl. 'Loyal State Deputy Forces'). The Malays members were trained as infantry soldiers while the Sikhs as artillery gunners. An English army officer, Captain Newland was appointed as the Officer commanding (OC) of the unit. Even upgraded into a military unit, the ATSN still entrusted with the roles of protecting public safety and enforcing the law. Their job at this time is similar to the Gendarmerie.

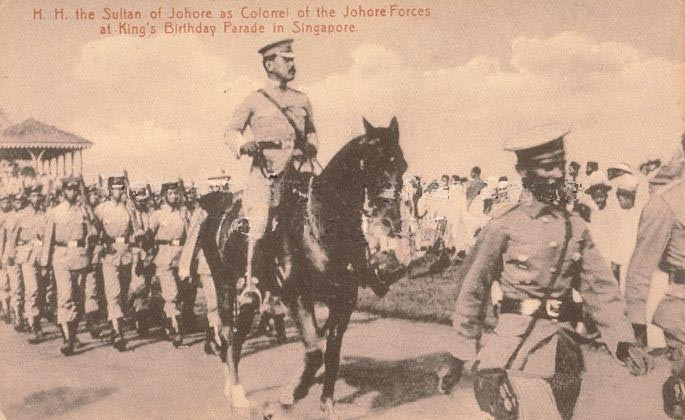
Sultan Ibrahim (reigned 1895–1959) as Colonel of the Johor Military Forces at King's Birthday Parade of George V in Singapore, c. 1920

In 1895, Sultan Ibrahim was appointed as JMF Colonel Commandant and the Force was further strengthened by the formation of the Johor Volunteer Forces (JVF). In the early 1900s, the name was changed to its current title — Askar Timbalan Setia Negeri (ATSN; transl. 'Loyal State Deputy Troops'). The current English name, the Johor Military Forces (JMF), was introduced in 1905 after three of its main unit (Infantry, Artillery and the Istana Guard) were merged into one. The JMF personnel was increased to 576 in 1915: 394 infantry soldiers, 98 artillery soldiers and 84 other personnel. Sultan Ibrahim then appointed Lieutenant Colonel Tompkins and Sergeant Major Claymore to provide training and instruction. Sultan Ibrahim was the first ruler to bestow new Royal Military colours to the JMF during a Presentation of Colours ceremony when the force celebrated its 30th anniversary on 11 May 1916. In 1940 and 1941, Sultan Ibrahim sent a small number of officers to Dehra Dun, India to undergo military training aimed at improving the effectiveness of the Johor military. In 1942, after the Japanese occupation of Malaya, the JMF was disbanded and later been revived back in c. 1948.

=== Post-independence (1957–present) ===
In 1992, during the 1993 constitutional crisis, the federal government under the leadership of Mahathir Mohamad proposed to disband JMF, due to its involvement in the Gomez incident and reports of alleged extortion on members of the public. On 4 July 1994, the government officially tabled the Johore Military Forces (Disbandment and Repeal) Bill 1994 to the Dewan Rakyat, the bill was however withdrawn two days later on 6 July. Despite the withdrawal, the government has on several occasions hinted JMF may still be disbanded in the future. During the crisis, Sultan Iskandar has sought legal advice from the former Lord President of the Supreme Court, Tun Salleh Abas, who opined that JMF is part of the Johor monarch's royal privileges and cannot be deprived without the Sultan's consent under the Federal Constitution. This was concurred by Neil Lawson, a Queen's Counsel who was once involved in the drafting of Malaya's constitution in 1957. The plan to disband JMF did not materialise and the JMF has continued to exist ever since.

== Roles ==
=== Past roles ===
The roles of the JMF have expanded during the history of the Force. Initially, it was established for Johor's safety and the king's protection. They later become a Gendarmerie unit tasked to protect the public safety in Johor. Some of them were assigned as palace Guards, guarding the palaces belonging to the Johor royal family.

JMF is believed to be the oldest military unit in Malaysia with significant historical roles, especially in the suppression of the 1915 Singapore Mutiny and in both World Wars. During World War I, the JMF was loaned to the British military. As the Johor State Forces, it played a significant role in the suppression and capturing the Indian soldiers of 5th Light Infantry who deserted in the "Singapore Mutiny" incident. They were tasked to assist the British as prison guards for the German POW camp (Tanglin Barracks) in Singapore, maintaining the security of government premises in Singapore, and patrol on Pulau Brani and Pulau Belakang Mati (now known as Sentosa Island). Besides that, they also tasked to guard the main road in Mersing, Kluang and Batu Pahat, and the British military airbase in Kluang (now become the HQ of Malaysian Army Aviation).

=== Present-day roles ===
The modern JMF's roles is a second line of defence right after the Malaysian Armed Forces (MAF). Their main roles are to protect Sultan of Johor, his royal family and properties. The JMF troops will be tasked with guard duty at four royal palaces in Johor Bahru. Beside the palaces, they are also tasked to guarding the JMF's camps, military posts, marching band's building, royal dock and royal yachts. They also tasked to become the Guard of honour during official ceremonies and foreign delegations visit to Johor.

Their secondary roles are as a standby infantry unit for the MAF in case of emergency or armed conflict. During an emergency, the JMF will be put under the command of the MAF.

== Ranks and positions ==
=== Commissioned officers ===
The following are rank insignia for commissioned officers for the Johor Military Force.

Rank group	General / flag officers			Senior officers	Junior officers
Royal Johor Military Force								No insignia
Royal Johor Military Force	Komandan	Mejar Jeneral	Brigedier Jeneral	Mejar	Kapten	Leftenan	Leftenan Muda	Pegawai Kadet
Notes:	Honorary only. Now only reserved for the Sultan	Rank for the Commanding officer of JMF. Was reserved for the Sultan only, until 2017	Rank for the Deputy Commanding officer of JMF. Was reserved for the Crown prince only, until 2017	Rank for the Second-in-command of JMF. Most senior non-royal appointments	In charge of company or leader of smaller specialised team such as marching band and special force	In charge of Istana Guards platoons

==== Major general and brigadier general ====
The JMF has complicated ranks for its officers. It has the ranks of major general and brigadier general even though the overall strength of the JMF is more and less of a battalion. The history of the ranks begin in February 1941 when the strength of the JMF is c. 2000 soldiers and the Johor Volunteer Forces (JVF) is c. 1000 soldiers. Sultan Ibrahim as the commandant of both forces combined the forces and promoted the JMF's Second-in-Command of that time, Lieutenant Colonel Dato' Haji Yahya into the rank of colonel. One month later, the Sultan assumed the rank of major-general. After World War II and the establishment of Malayan Union, the strength of JMF was reduced into 100 soldiers. With the Sultan's rank as Major General of the JMF made redundant, the Sultan was instead appointed an honorary major general in the British Army in 1947.

The present-day JMF's rank of major general is an honorary rank reserved only for the Sultan from 1947 until 2017, while the rank of brigadier general is reserved only for the Crown Prince. In March 2017, the Crown Prince or Tunku Mahkota of Johor, Tunku Ismail was promoted to major general for his achievement in modernising the JMF.

=== Other ranks ===
The following are rank insignia for other ranks for the Johor Military Force.

Rank group	Senior NCOs			Junior NCOs		Enlisted
Royal Johor Military Force						No insignia
Royal Johor Military Force	Pegawai Waren/Sarjan Mejar	Staf Sarjan	Sarjan	Korporal	Lans Korporal	Prebet	Rekrut

=== Commandant of JMF ===
There is two commandant post throughout the history of JMF. It is the Commandant Colonel of JMF and the Commandant of JMF. The Commandant Colonel of JMF is reserved only for the Sultan while the Commandant of JMF was the most professional non-royal appointments appointed by the Sultan to lead the force. The first Commandant of JMF is Captain C. N. C. Newland of the 2nd Battalion South Irish Division, Royal Artillery, who was appointed as an instructor and commandant in 1887. The position of Commandant of JMF was abolished in the 1920s and replaced with the position of Military Advisor (the most senior positions for European) and Second-in-Command (the most senior positions for locals). The Sultan assumed the post of Commandant Colonel cum Commanding officer of JMF. The Sultan's post of Commandant Colonel of JMF is later known as the Commandant of JMF.

=== Commanding officer of JMF ===
The Commanding officer (CO) of JMF is the most senior post in the JMF. This post is reserved for the Sultan of Johor's Royal Family to lead the JMF in administration and combat. Historically, this post belongs to the Sultan of Johor. The Commanding officer of JMF holds the rank of major general. The current commanding officer of JMF is Major General Tunku Ismail Idris.

=== Second-in-Command of JMF ===
The Second-in-Command (2IC) of JMF is the most professional position in the JMF. The 2IC of JMF post is the highest positions that any JMF officers can achieve and holds the rank of major. The current 2IC of JMF is Major Ahmad Hamdan Libar, succeeding Captain Jalalludin Hamsan, the previous 2IC that retired on 1 February 2024.

== Uniform ==
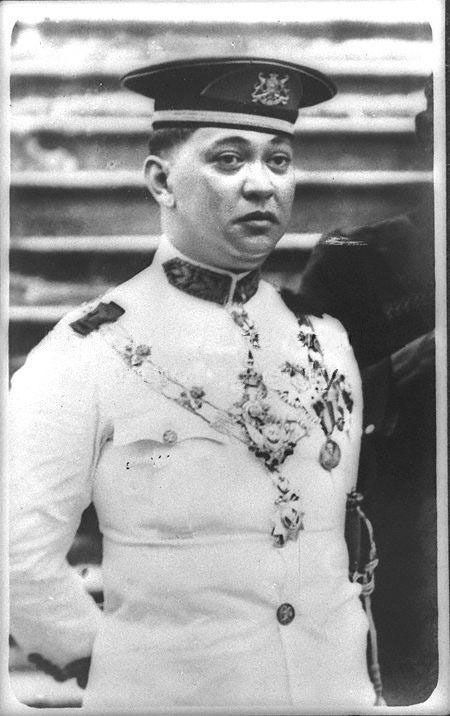
Tunku Ismail, then Tunku Mahkota of Johor, in the 1950s wearing No 1 Uniform with Topi Timbalan.

The uniforms of the JMF have changed throughout its history. In the early years of its establishment, the JMF used the same uniform as the police force (khaki colour uniform) but with red songkoks instead of the black used by the regular policemen. Today, they are known for using:

Topi Timbalan

A black service cap with yellow trims and without a visor is used by the JMF troops during ceremonial duties. Usually matches together with the white JMF's service dress uniform (No 1 Uniform). It was a part of the JMF since the early 20th century for the other ranks troops while the officers used the normal version (see the image above of Sultan Ibrahim during the King's Birthday Parade in Singapore). It later become the unique identity of JMF and is nowadays used even by the Sultan as a part of His Majesty's attires.

Green Beret

It is used by the JMF paired with combat uniform (No 5 Uniform) and Rifle green service dress uniform (No 3 Uniform). The beret has been used by the JMF since the 1940s and originally in rifle green colour to symbolised the JMF's infantry status. The colour later changed to Sherwood green (also known as Commando green) in the early '80s to matching the commando-trained status of Tunku Ibrahim Ismail, who was at the time newly appointed as the Tunku Mahkota of Johor and in the same time as the Deputy Commanding Officer of JMF.

Combat Uniform

In the era of digital camouflage combat uniforms, the JMF retains the first camouflage pattern used by the Malaysian Army. The colour scheme in brush stroke pattern camouflage was introduced to the Malaysian Army at the end of the 1970s. The JMF started using them in the early '80s.

== Formations ==
The formations of the JMF changes a few times throughout its history.

=== Johore Constabulary Forces (1886–1887) ===
*Later renamed to Timbalan Setia Negeri.

- Police and The Sultan Bodyguard unit
- Istana Guards

=== Angkatan Timbalan Setia Negeri (1887–1900s) ===
- Infantry/Gendarmerie forces
- Artillery forces
- ATSN Marching band (Malay: Pasukan Pancaragam Timbalan Setia Negeri)

=== Askar Timbalan Setia Negeri (1900s–present) ===
1900s–1905

- Infantry/Gendarmerie forces
- Istana Guards
- Artillery forces
- ATSN Marching band

1905–1939

The highest strength of JMF is in 1922 with 645 personnel.

- Johor Military Force
  - Infantry/Gendarmerie forces
  - Istana Guards
  - Artillery forces
- ATSN Marching band

1939–1942

The highest strength of JMF by WWII is around 2000 personnel.

- Johor Military Force
  - Infantry/Gendarmerie forces
  - Istana Guards
- Artillery forces (Ceremonial)

Post-WWII–1978

- Johor Military Force
  - Istana Guards

1979–2007

- Johor Military Force
  - Istana Guards
  - JMF Marching Band
  - Administrations unit

==== Current formations ====
The current JMF formations is divided into four units:

===== Istana Guards =====
Also known as the Astana Guards (English pronunciation for 'Istana'), it is the biggest unit in the JMF. It consists of eight infantry platoons. The guards will be on duty for 24 hours non stop. They are entrusted to guarding the four Istanas ('Palaces') that located inside Johor Bahru — the Istana Bukit Serene, Istana Besar, Istana Bukit Pelangi, and Istana Pasir Pelangi. Beside the palaces, they are tasked to guarding the JMF's camps (in Taman Dahlia and Tampoi), military posts (in Straits Views, Skudai and Kolam Air), the marching band's building, royal's dock (in Stulang) and the royal yachts. During guard duty, the guards are equipped with M-16 fixed with a bayonet.

===== Marching Band of the Royal Johor Military Force =====
Established in 1979, this military band is a ceremonial unit that always takes part in ceremonial occasions that involving the Sultan of Johor and his Royal Family. It is the heir and successor of the legacy of the Band of the ATSN (EST. in the early 1900s). It is affiliated to the bands of the Malaysian Army as its bandsmen are trained by conductors and directors of music of Army bands like the Central Band of the Royal Malay Regiment.

===== Administrations unit =====
JMF officers and soldiers that assigned to administration, office work and instructor positions.

===== Elite force platoon =====
Established in 2008, the JMF Elite Unit is a special forces unit placed under the responsibility of the JMF with the mandate of providing security and close protection to the Royal Family of Johor, counter-terrorism and special reconnaissance in any incidents involving the state of Johor. This unit is the latest addition to the JMF and it only recruits its members from the JMF Istana Guards.

== Selection and training ==
The JMF only recruits its members from Malaysians born in Johor, aged between 18 and 23 years old. There is a special criterion which is prioritised to those who know to read and write in Jawi script. This tradition continues since the JMF establishment in 1886.

=== Preliminary stage – At owns district ===
Last only for a day, it is done annually where the JMF staff will visit each district in Johor to recruit the potential trainees. The minimum physical requirement is 168 cm (5.51 ft) for height and 47.5 kg (105 lb) for weight. Potential trainees will go through a series of physical test.

=== Preliminary stage – At JMF's camp ===
Trainees that succeeded the first stage will be brought to the Sultan Ibrahim Camp to face another series of test. The number of trainees here is double the size of the vacant slots. This stage is required to weed out half of its trainees. There are two tests here which is:

- Physical Fitness Test (PFT) – Including 2.4 km (1.5 mi) run under 14 minutes.
- Character and behaviour test – Trainees are tested to make sure their interest is genuine and has the right attitudes and quality as outlined by the JMF — Loyalty, brave and serving with honour.

=== JMF Basic Training (6 months) ===
The trainee who passed all the preliminary stage will be selected as new JMF recruits. They will be trained with basic soldiering and infantry training. The training is not 100% similar to the Malaysian Army Basic Training. As royal guards, the training been through by the JMF recruits also includes protocol training, more precisely, how to interact with the royals. The recruits are required to master the Jawi script as all reports must be written in Jawi.

=== Advanced training ===
There are many opportunities given by the JMF for its members. The sultan also encourages them to try for the JMF Elite Forces in their early 20s so they can stay fit for the special forces unit. The JMF also send their members to receive training at the Malaysia Armed Forces training centres. Some of the advanced training offered are:

- Basic Parachute Course, at Special Warfare Training Centre (PULPAK)
- Section/Platoon Leader Course, at Army Combat Training Centre (PULADA)
- Advanced Firearms Course, at PULADA
- Physical training instructor (PTI) Course, at PULADA
- Army Musician training, at the Army School of Music (PUZIDA) (Bandsmen only)
- Elite forces selection

== Notable members ==
The JMF has produced some of the country's best known leaders and celebrities. Among them are:

- Dato' Abdullah Jaafar – He was a civil servant and the 3rd Chief Minister of Johor.
- Tun Hussein Onn – He was a politician and the 3rd Malaysian Prime Minister. He joined the JMF as an Officer cadet and was granted a scholarship to continue his military education at the Indian Military Academy. Graduating from the academy during WWII, he was commissioned as an officer in the British Indian Army and deployed to the Middle East. After the war, he served as a senior police officer and was employed as an instructor at the Malayan Police Recruiting and Training Centre in Rawalpindi. Later, he was appointed as the Commandant of the Johor Bahru Police Depot. Then he joined the civil service before entering politics.
- General (Rtd) Tun Ibrahim Ismail – He was a senior military officer, secret agent and the 5th Chief of Defence Force of Malaysia. He joined the JMF as Officer cadet and was given the scholarship to continue his military education at the Indian Military Academy. Commissioned as an officer in the British Indian Army and was recruited to the Force 136. Parachuted into the western coast of Terengganu as part of Operation Oatmeal together with another two agents. His team was betrayed and then captured by the Japanese. He agreed to become a double agent for Japanese force after being tortured for a month, but manage to inform Force 136 HQ about the situation. Effectively become a triple agent and gave false information about Operation Zipper to the Japanese force. For his cunning and deception, Ismail was awarded an MBE by the British. He continued to serve with the JMF after the war and later transferred to the Malay Regiment (now known as the Royal Malay Regiment) in 1951. Appointed to the 5th Malaysian Chief of Defence Forces in 1970.
- Dato' Sir Onn Jaafar – He was a politician, the 7th Chief Minister of Johor, and the founding father of UMNO, a political party. He was a civil servant before joining the JMF for two years. He held the rank of lieutenant in JMF and later rejoined the civil service.
- Dato' Ungku Abdul Hamid Ungku Abdul Majid – He was a civil servant and the 6th Chief Minister of Johor. He is the father of Ungku Abdul Aziz, a prominent economist in Malaysia, and the grandfather of Zeti Akhtar Aziz, a former Governor of Bank Negara Malaysia. He joined the JMF in c. 1910 as Officer cadet, and was promoted to 2nd Lieutenant in May 1912 at the same time assigned as the Aide-de-camp to the Sultan. He was promoted to major in August 1923, and was assigned to the Johor Volunteer Forces (JVF) before became the chief minister.
- Zamatul Amri 'Tauke Jambu' Zakaria – A Malaysian comedian and celebrity. He was a part of the Series 1/98 intake. He held the rank of Private before quitting to become a comedian.
- Mohamed Hamzah - Designer of the flag of Malaysia.

== Current development ==
The JMF has continued to exist to date as one of Johor's defences, besides performing mainly ceremonial functions. The JMF Elite Forces (dubbed JMF Commando) was established on 7 July 2008 and has been providing security and close protection to the Royal Family of Johor since 2008. In April 2016, the Sultan suggested that so the JMF roles were widened to include as security forces for state government buildings.

Sultan Ibrahim Ismail stressed the importance of good ties be maintained with clear line of roles drawn between JMF and Malaysian Armed Forces (MAF) as the JMF was not formed and intended to be the country's first line of defence, thus the word 'timbalan' meaning deputy in its Malay name, indicating its task as the second line and roles in assisting MAF.

Timeline

- November 2011 – A new camp for the JMF begins its construction.
- July 2012 – The JMF held a passing-out parade in traditional full dress uniform, to mark the end of training for its 61 recruits, for the first time since 1947.
- 8 April 2016 – The new camp was inaugurated as the Sultan Ibrahim Camp. The JMF troops was relocated from its old camp, The Fort, Bukit Timbalan to the new camp.
- 11 May 2016 – The JMF celebrated its 130th anniversary, new colours were bestowed and granted to the force by the decree of Sultan Ibrahim Ismail. The retirement and presentation of colours ceremony was carried out in Trooping the Colour parade held at the grounds of Istana Besar, Johor Bahru in the presence of the Sultan of Johor.

== Equipment ==
Personnel gears

- SPECTRA helmet
- Blackhawk Tactical Vest Type IV
- Nomex battle dress uniform
- Magnum Stealth II tactical boots

Firearms

Name	Origin	Type	References
Glock 17	Austria	Semi-automatic pistol	
SIG Sauer P226	Switzerland	Semi-automatic pistol	
Remington 870	United States	Shotgun	
CZ Scorpion Evo 3	Czech Republic	Submachine gun	
Heckler & Koch MP5	Germany	Submachine gun	
Brügger & Thomet MP9	Switzerland	Submachine gun	
SIG SG 553 SOW	Switzerland	Assault rifle	
Colt M16A4	United States	Assault rifle	
Accuracy International Arctic Warfare	United Kingdom	Sniper rifle	
Rocket-propelled grenade		Hand-held rocket launcher	

Vehicles

Name	Origin	Type	References
Mildef Ribat	Malaysia	Armoured car	
DefTech Handalan	Malaysia	Transport truck	
Toyota Hilux	Japan	Utility vehicle	

== See also ==
- Malaysian Armed Forces
- 1992 Gomez Incident
