= Sniper Alley =

Street in Sarajevo, Bosnia and Herzegovina

Coordinates: 43.856°N 18.413°E

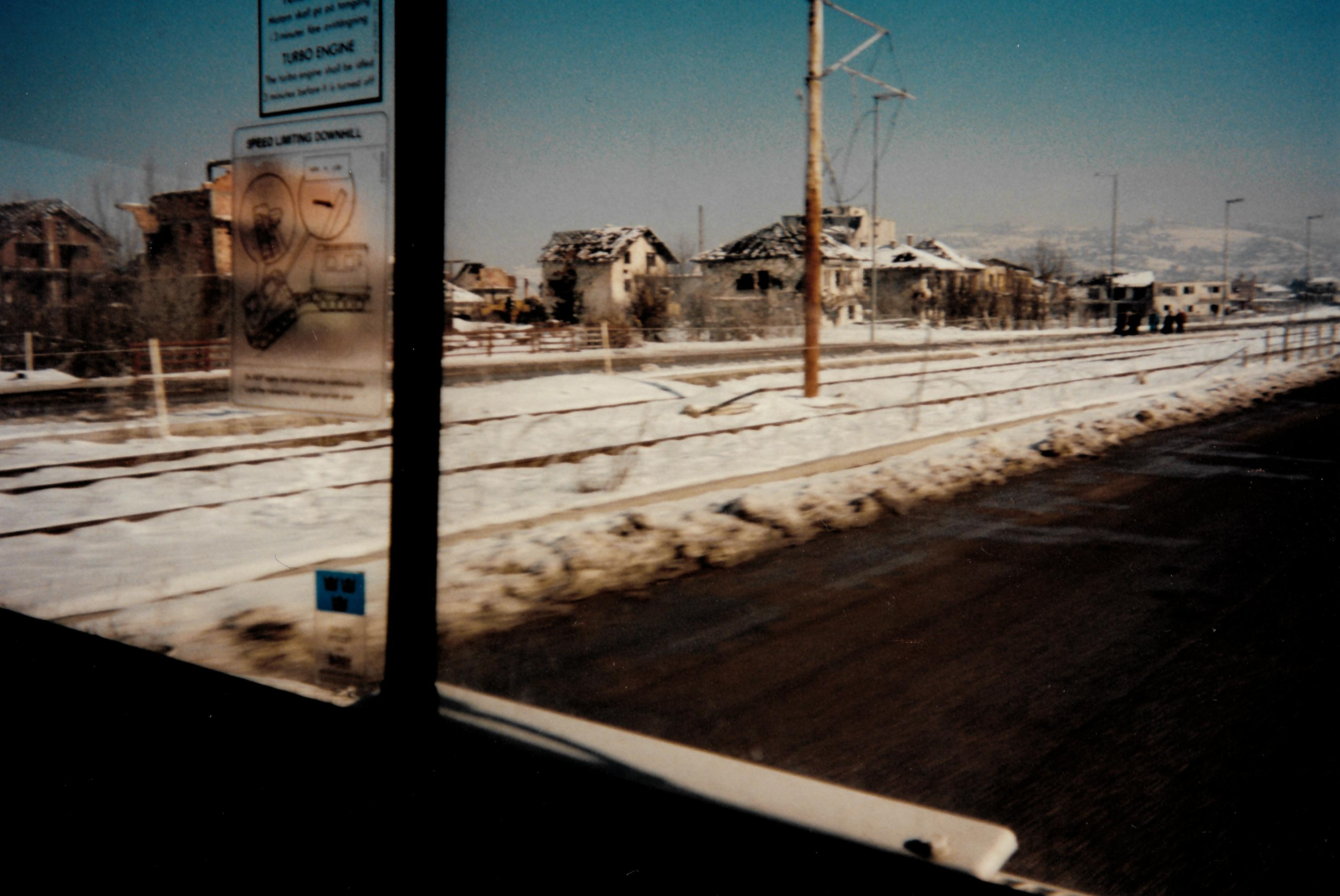
Sniper Alley in 1996, seen from a IFOR vehicle.

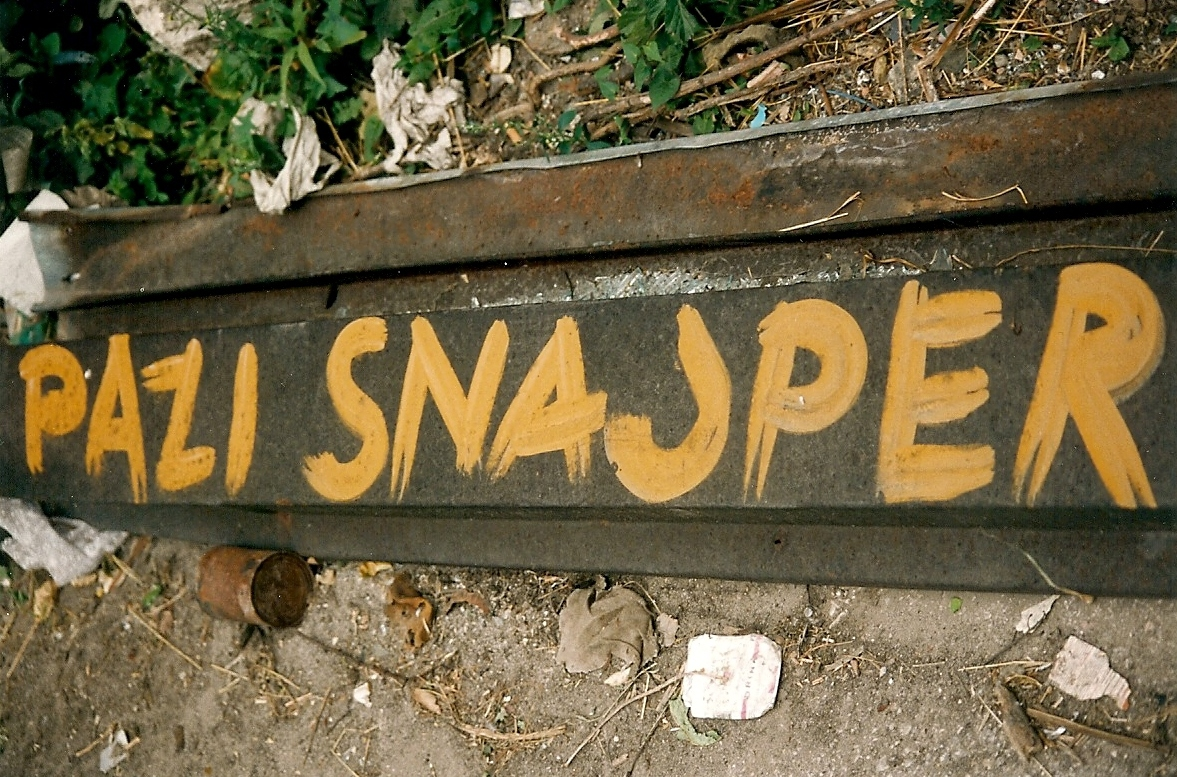
Hand-painted warning sign: "Watch out – Sniper"

"Sniper Alley" (Bosnian: Snajperska aleja / Снајперска алеја) was the informal name primarily for streets such as Ulica Zmaja od Bosne (Dragon of Bosnia Street) and Meša Selimović Boulevard, the main boulevard in Sarajevo which during the Bosnian War was lined with Serbian snipers' posts, and became infamous as a dangerous place for civilians to traverse. The road connects the industrial part of the city (and further on, Sarajevo Airport) to the Old Town's cultural and historic sites. The boulevard itself has many high-rise buildings giving sniper shooters extensive fields of fire.

Mountains surrounding the city were also used for sniper positions, providing a safe distance and giving a view into the city and its traffic. Although the city was under constant Serb siege, its people still had to move about the city in order to survive, thus routinely risking their lives. Signs reading "Pazi – Snajper!" ("Watch out – Sniper!") became common. People would either run fast across the street or would wait for United Nations armored vehicles and walk behind them, using them as protective shields. According to data gathered in 1995, the snipers wounded 1,030 people and killed 225, including 60 children.

In November 2025, the public prosecutor's office in Milan opened an investigation into claims that Italian citizens had paid for "sniper safaris" - where large sums of money had been paid by wealthy individuals with a "passion for weapons" in order to shoot and kill civilians from Serb positions. According to la Repubblica, the "sniper tourists", usually wealthy tourists, paid about €100,000, or $116,000 adjusted for current inflation rates, to join trips to Sarajevo.
