= Sabre squadron =

Type of special operations squadron

A sabre squadron, or (in US English) saber squadron, is a battalion sized unit in some military ground forces.

The term originated in the British Army, and is derived from the sabre traditionally used by soldiers mounted on horses, including cavalry. In British usage, it typically refers to units descended directly from, or influenced by, traditional cavalry regiments, such as armoured or reconnaissance units.

The term has often been used by special forces units. This usage stems largely from the adoption of sabre squadron terminology in the British Special Air Service. The American Delta Force and Australian SASR also use the term.

== See also ==
- Squadron (army)
