= VAT 69 Commando =

Special forces of the Royal Malaysia Police

69 Commando
- 69 Komando ٦٩ كومندو
- The crest of 69 Commando PGK
- Active: 23 October 1969; 56 years ago
- Country: Malaysia
- Branch: Royal Malaysia Police
- Type: Special forces
- Role: Counter-terrorism; Special reconnaissance Intelligence gathering Direct action Search and rescue
- Part of: Special Operations Command
- Garrison/HQ: Camp Sultan Nazrin Shah, Perak
- Nicknames: VAT 69, Komando Polis ("Police Commando"), 69-er, Six-Nine
- Mottos: "Warisan Darah Perwira" (Inheritance of The Blood of Warriors)
- Colors: Regimental: Black, Red and Yellow; Beret: Sand Coloured
- Anniversaries: 20 October
- Engagements: List: Communist insurgency in Malaysia (1968–1989); Operation 304 (2000); Piracy in the Strait of Malacca; Operation MV Paulijing (2005); Timor-Leste crisis (2006); Operation Astute; United Nations Integrated Mission in East Timor (2006–2012); Cross border attacks in Sabah (1962–present); Operation Daulat (2013)

Commanders
- Current commander: SAC Hamzah Hashim
- Notable commanders: A. Navaratnam, Abdul Rashid Harun, Abdul Razak Mohd Yusof SP, Mohd Noor Razak PGB

The 69 Commando (Malay: 69 Komando; Jawi: ٦٩ كومندو), also known as Very Able Troopers 69 (abbreviated as VAT 69), is an elite special forces unit of the Royal Malaysia Police (RMP). The unit is based at Camp Sultan Nazrin Shah in Ulu Kinta, Perak. Along with the Special Actions Unit (Unit Tindakhas; UTK), it forms the Police Special Operations Command (Pasukan Gerakan Khas; PGK). The primary mission of 69 Commando is to conduct high-risk tasks such as counter-terrorism, hostage rescue, intelligence gathering, and counter-insurgency within Malaysian borders.

Before 1989, the primary task of 69 Commando was to conduct operations against communist insurgents in the Malaysian jungle. Many of its operatives were recruited from the Senoi Praaq, an elite tracking unit and masters of the jungle, which is now a component of the RMP General Operations Force (GOF). Today, 69 Commando holds a much wider counter-terrorism and counter-insurgency role, yet it maintains significant expertise in jungle warfare.

== History ==
=== Origins: 1968 Communist insurgency ===
The 69 Commando, originally known as the Task Force, Charlie Force, or the Special Project Team, was established in 1969. The numerical designation "69" refers to its year of founding. The unit was modelled on the British 22nd Special Air Service (22 SAS) Regiment as a small, highly mobile combat unit designed to counter the tactics of communist insurgents. The proposal for an elite paramilitary police unit was initiated by the then Minister of Home Affairs, Tun Dr Ismail Abdul Rahman, to address the escalation of the Second Malayan Emergency, which began in 1968.

In 1968, a pioneer team of 31 police officers from the Police Field Force (Malay: Pasukan Polis Hutan; PPH) was sent to the Malaysian Special Service Unit (MSSU) at Camp Sebatang Karah in Port Dickson for a basic commando course. Only five officers graduated from this initial programme. This team was primarily used to provide insights into the selection process and help the Royal Malaysia Police (RMP) prepare for future recruitment.

In October 1969, approximately 1,600 personnel from the PPH applied for the selection. Following a rigorous pre-selection process, 60 candidates proceeded to the basic commando course. On 23 October 1969, a group of instructors from the British SAS arrived at Fort Kemar in Perak to supervise the basic commando course. Thirty officers successfully completed the course, forming the nucleus of the 69 Commando. At the time, the unit was officially named Pasukan Polis Hutan 69 (PPH 69) and operated as a component of the Police Field Force (present-day General Operations Force).

=== Relationship with the Senoi Praaq ===
During the 1970s, 69 Commando conducted its initial operations against the Malayan National Liberation Army (MNLA). The unit was effective in neutralising insurgents and recovering significant quantities of weapons and equipment. 69 Commando maintained a close operational relationship with the Senoi Praaq Regiment, an elite light infantry unit composed of Orang Asli personnel. Together, they conducted operations against pro-communist "ASAL" groups, which consisted of Orang Asli sympathisers of the communist movement.

=== Expansion and further specialisation ===
In 1977, three additional squadrons were established and trained by the New Zealand Special Air Service (NZSAS). During this period, a dedicated course was also developed to train internal instructors. By 1980, the expansion programme was complete, and 69 Commando became a fully equipped unit with its own logistical support department.

In 1978, 65 personnel from the unit were sent to Hua Hin, Thailand, for airborne training by instructors from the Border Patrol Police of the Royal Thai Police. This month-long course focused on parachuting skills, specifically static line insertion techniques.

=== Modernisation and the Nelson Glory Project ===
Following the formal end of the communist insurgency in 1989, the unit's focus shifted from jungle warfare to modern unconventional threats. The Malaysian government decided to retrain two militarised units, the 69 Commando and the 11th Special Service Regiment of the Malaysian Army, in counter-terrorism to support the existing Special Actions Unit (UTK). This modernisation effort was designated the "Nelson Glory Project". In 1990, instructors from the British 22 SAS were deployed to Malaysia to train both units in urban warfare and counter-terrorism. Since this transition, these three units have served as Malaysia's primary counter-terrorism forces.

=== Integration into Pasukan Gerakan Khas ===
On 20 October 1997, under the administration of Prime Minister Mahathir Mohamad and Inspector-General of Police Tan Sri Rahim Noor, the RMP reorganised its special operations structure. The 69 Commando and the UTK were unified under a single command known as Pasukan Gerakan Khas (PGK), or the Police Special Operations Command. Although they were amalgamated into one directorate, both units remain distinct entities that operate in different tactical environments.

=== New headquarters ===
Since its establishment in 1969, 69 Commando has shared facilities with various other police units. In 2024, a dedicated site in Ulu Kinta, Perak, named the Camp Sultan Nazrin Shah, was officially handed over to the unit to serve as its permanent garrison and headquarters. Prior to this, 69 Commando was based within the General Operations Force Northern Brigade camp, which is also located in Ulu Kinta.

The construction of the new headquarters began in 2018 with an allocation of RM236 million. The complex received its certificate of completion on 14 February 2024, and the unit began moving into the facility in stages. The official handover ceremony took place on 4 May 2024 and was witnessed by Prime Minister Datuk Seri Anwar Ibrahim. The establishment of this dedicated camp is regarded as a significant recognition of the unit's role in national security.

== Functions ==
VAT 69 roles are believed to include:

- Intelligence collection in deep reconnaissance missions and warfare.
- Special operations to support the RMP Special Branch in combating subversive organisations or terrorist activities.
- Counter-terrorism operations inside Malaysian territory in conjunction with armed forces.
- Law enforcement operations in dealing with armed criminals inside Malaysian territory.
- Counter-terrorism operations outside Malaysian territory; including Operation Astute in Timor Leste.
- Search and rescue operations inside or outside Malaysian territory, such as aid operations in the aftermath of the 2004 tsunami in Acheh, Indonesia.
- Support in term of technique and training to the other RMP elite units; namely Ungerin and Tiger platoon

== Identity ==
=== Sand coloured berets ===
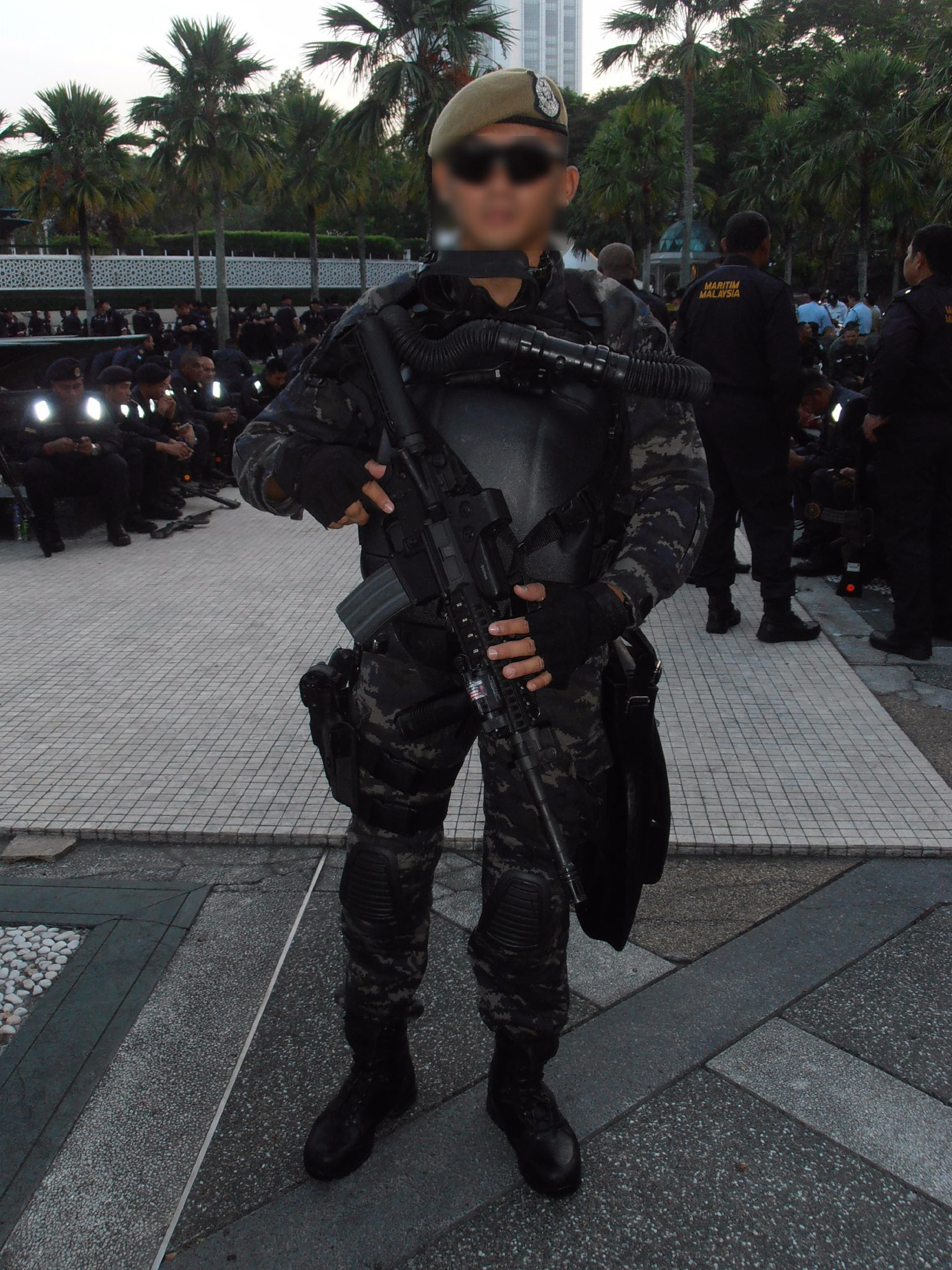
An officer of 69 Commando of Pasukan Gerakan Khas with his Colt M4 APC SOPMOD on standby during the 60th National Day Parade of Malaysia at Merdeka Square, Kuala Lumpur.

The sand coloured beret was bestowed by 22nd Special Air Service when the original VAT 69 troop was founded and trained by SAS instructors. The sand-coloured beret then given back to the VAT 69 after the beret was officially accepted as an official headdress of VAT 69 on 18 December 2004 by the then Inspector-General of Police, Tan Sri Mohd Bakri Omar.

On 14 November 2006, for the first time in the history of Royal Malaysian Police, the maroon and sand-coloured berets of PGK were honoured as Royal Berets by Yang Dipertuan Agong Tuanku Syed Sirajuddin Syed Putera Jamalullail, the then King of Malaysia.

=== Parachute wings ===
These wings, worn on the left arm of the uniform, identify the wearer as a qualified parachutist, airborne unit and air assault operations operator. The parachute wings are mostly worn by operators from Pasukan Gerakan Khas and are awarded on completion of the Basic Tactical Parachuting Course (Malay: Kursus Asas Payung Terjun Taktikal). The wing's design is inspired from the Royal Thai Police Parachute Jump Wings Badge.

=== VAT 69 Commando emblem and insignia ===
Motto
Warisan Darah Perwira (Inheritance of The Blood of Warriors)
Black
Black symbolises the highly secretive nature of VAT 69 operations.
Red
Red symbolises bravery.
Yellow
Yellow symbolises "Loyalty to King and Country" (Malay: Taat Setia kepada Raja dan Negara).
Javelin
Lembing, another traditional weapon used by Malay warriors.
Two pieces of the curved Kerambit dagger.
Arranged to form the number 69, signifying stealth and efficiency.

== Organisation ==
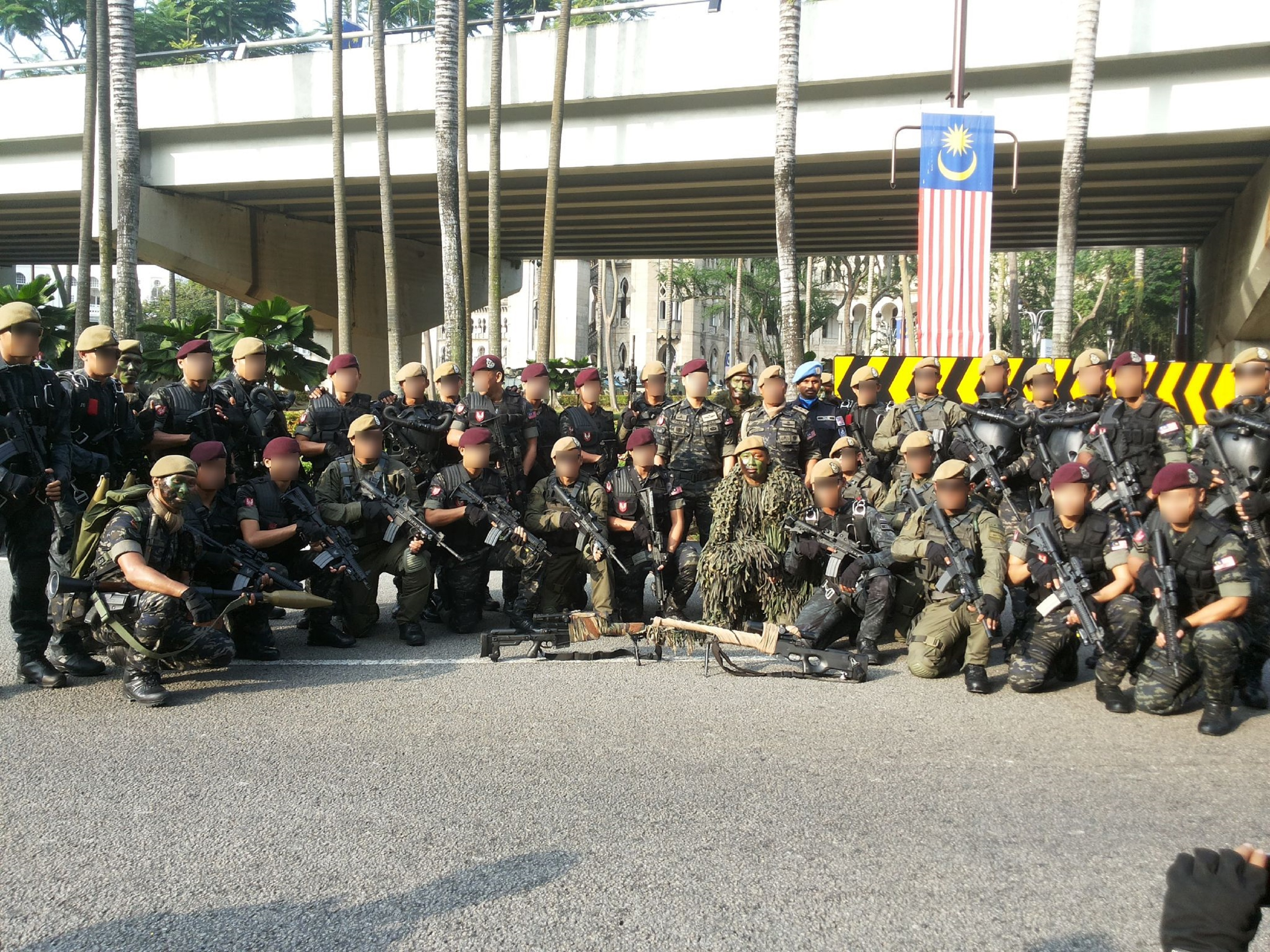
Operators from Special Actions Unit and 69 Commando Battalion of Police SOCOM posing for group photo before the 60th Merdeka Day parade.

There are four infantry squadrons in VAT 69 Commando with its own logistics unit, totalling around 1,900 members. Squadrons are split into patrol teams consisting of six to ten operatives led by a Police Inspector (Insp) or Superintendent of Police (SUPT). Within each patrol, individual members may specialise in sniping, explosive ordnance disposal, demolitions, communications and as field medics.

Previously separate entities, both the VAT 69 and the UTK were amalgamated into the PGK Command on 20 October 1997, when it was launched by the 5th Inspector-General of Police, Tan Sri Rahim Noor. However, VAT 69 and the UTK are still operational as separate units. The UTK is now officially known as Pasukan Gerakan Khas Detachment A and VAT 69 has been deputised to Pasukan Gerakan Khas Detachment B.

Based at the Bukit Aman, Kuala Lumpur, the PGK is under the direct command of the RMP's Internal Security and Public Order (Malay: Keselamatan Dalam Negeri dan Ketenteraman Awam; KDNKA) Director. The unit commander holds the rank of Senior Assistant Commissioner (SAC) and is the deputy director of the Internal Security and Public Order (Special Operations Command).

== Roles ==
Originally established to counter the communist threat during the insurgency years; VAT 69 was raised and trained by the British SAS to specialise in jungle warfare, deep reconnaissance and counter-insurgency. Originally trained by the British SAS, VAT 69 commandos conduct land, sea and air special operation techniques, with a specialty in jungle warfare and deep reconnaissance missions. They execute special operations in support of the Police Special Branch fight against subversive organisations and terrorist activities, conduct offensive operations using special weapons and tactics, counter-terrorism, counter-insurgency, hostage rescue, close protection and supporting the special forces, Rapid Deployment Force (Malay: Pasukan Aturgerak Cepat; PAC) or infantry force of the Malaysian Armed Forces in any security measures.

With the growing threat of terrorism since the 11 September attacks, this unit has increasingly adapted itself to conduct counter-terrorism duties. With the aim of creating teams that are capable of dealing with a broad range of operations (especially counter-terrorism operations), the PGK has forged closer relations with the special forces of the Malaysian Armed Forces, including the 10th Paratrooper Brigade, Grup Gerak Khas, PASKAL and PASKAU, so as to enable them to more effectively enforce security within Malaysia's borders.

VAT 69's and UTK's snipers, technicians and explosive expertise specialists regularly cross-train with foreign special forces including the Special Air Service Regiments of Australia, New Zealand and the United Kingdom, the Royal Thai Border Patrol Police, and a number of U.S. services including the Army Green Berets, Navy SEALs and others.

In 2014, RMP established new elite units (STAFOC, STING and STAGG). UTK and VAT 69 is given another role which is to support these three new units in term of training and technical capabilities.

== Recruitment, selection and training ==
To join 69 Commando, candidates must successfully complete a rigorous selection and training pipeline. The process is open to all personnel within the Royal Malaysia Police (RMP) who are under 30 years of age and possess a clean health record. While members of the RMP General Operations Force (GOF) are often preferred due to their prior exposure to infantry tactics and jungle warfare, this is not a mandatory prerequisite.

The primary requirement for volunteers is a minimum of two years of service within any branch or department of the RMP. This ensures that all operatives possess a comprehensive understanding of law enforcement policies and police procedures. Volunteers from non-infantry backgrounds are required to complete the three-month Kursus Asas Pasukan Gerakan Am (General Operations Force Basic Course) before entering the commando pipeline.

The selection process is divided into four distinct phases:

- Pasukan Gerakan Khas Physical Screening Test
- Pre-Basic Commando Course
- Basic 69 Commando Course (Malay: Kursus Asas 69 Komando)
- Continuation training

=== Pasukan Gerakan Khas Physical Screening Test (1 or 2 days) ===
The screening process typically lasts for two days and is a mandatory requirement for any police officer volunteering for units under the Pasukan Gerakan Khas, including 69 Commando and the Special Actions Unit. Prospective trainees are expected to exceed the minimum standards of the Physical Screening Test (PST) to demonstrate their suitability for special forces. The requirements include:

1. Run 3.2 kilometres (2.0 mi) in 11 minutes or less
2. Swim freestyle stroke for at least 8 to 10 laps
3. Do at least 9 to 13 chin-ups
4. Do at least 30 sit-ups
5. Do at least 60 push-ups
6. Do at least 30 squat thrusts

Candidates who successfully pass this screening are subsequently assigned to a pre-basic course specific to the unit for which they volunteered.

=== Pre-Basic Commando Course (2 weeks) ===
This preparatory phase lasts for two weeks and places a heavy emphasis on the mental and physical conditioning of volunteers before they undertake the formal commando course. During this period, candidates are introduced to basic infantry soldiering skills and small unit tactics. The training also focuses on building camaraderie among the volunteers, as these collective bonds and skills are essential for success in the subsequent phases of the pipeline.

=== Basic 69 Commando Course (20 weeks) ===
The primary distinction between the selection pipelines of 69 Commando and the Special Actions Unit (UTK) lies in this course. While the UTK training focuses predominantly on urban warfare, the 69 Commando course is specifically tailored for jungle and guerrilla operations.

Historically, 69 Commando candidates were required to complete the same 12-week Basic Commando Course currently utilised by the Malaysian Armed Forces special forces. However, the modern curriculum has been adapted to meet the specific operational requirements of the unit. Since July 2019, the duration has been extended to 20 weeks, and the syllabus has been restructured into three distinct phases:

First Phase

In the first phase, candidates are introduced to the four primary environments in which 69 Commando operates: built-up areas, jungle, swamp, and maritime settings. Trainees also study the theoretical and fundamental aspects of special operations, including map reading, infiltration methods, and survival techniques.

Second Phase

This phase places a heavy emphasis on small unit tactics. The syllabus covers several critical disciplines, including:

- Jungle and guerrilla warfare
- Weaponry and explosives
- Manhunt operations
- Field communications
- Field medicine

Third Phase

The final phase, designated as the Final Mission Execution, subjects candidates to comprehensive testing of all skills acquired throughout the preceding months. This stage is comparable to the "Escape and Evasion" phase found in military commando selection, requiring trainees to apply their knowledge under extreme pressure.

=== Continuation training ===
To accomplish its varied mission profiles, the 69 Commando ensures that its members are well trained in the required aspects of special operations. These include:

Insertion Techniques

1. HALO/HAHO
2. Fast roping techniques
3. Helo casting
4. Abseiling
5. Combat diving

Combat Techniques

1. Close Quarters Combat – CQC
2. Counter-insurgency
3. Unconventional warfare
4. Sabotage
5. Close VIP protection
6. Vehicular assault
7. Unarmed combat
8. Knife combat
9. Marksmanship
10. Booby-trap defusal
11. Underwater demolitions

Intelligence Gathering

1. Intelligence
2. Counter-intelligence
3. Special reconnaissance
4. Long-range Combat Patrol

Task Oriented

1. Aircraft Hijackings
2. Car stops
3. Combat, Search and Rescue (CSAR)
4. Coordinate multi-location warrant service
5. Dignitary protection
6. Explosive Ordnance Disposal (EOD)
7. Foreign language
8. Fugitive tracking (in rural environments)
9. Hazmat Disposal
10. High risk arrests (armed and dangerous subjects)
11. Hostage rescue (HR)
12. K9 Handling
13. Operations in WMD environments
14. Site surveys for high visibility events
15. Specialized sniper operations
16. Stronghold assaults (structures requiring specialised breaching equipment that local law enforcement might not have access to)
17. Tubular assaults (aircraft, trains, buses, etc.)

The 69 Commando is known to conduct joint training exercises and participate in exchange programs with Commonwealth special units such as the Australian SAS, New Zealand SAS, British SAS and Singapore Special Tactics and Rescue. The 69 Commando routinely trains with neighbouring nations' tactical teams such as the Indonesian Mobile Brigade and Thailand Border Patrol Police. Occasionally, the 69 Commando trains with Green Berets, Army Special Operations Command Pacific Unit (SOCPAC) of the United States and other international units.

On 10 December 2003, the then Inspector-General of Police, Tan Sri Mohd Bakri Haji Omar, launched the training program between the USSOCPAC and the VAT 69 at the GOF Training Center in Ulu Kinta, Perak. The SOCPAC team were to conduct joint exercise with the PGK, under the code-name Advance Vector Balance Mint for a duration of 2 weeks.

== Equipment ==
69 Commando teams use equipment designed for a variety of specialist situations.

The particular pieces of equipment vary from unit to unit, but there are some consistent trends in what they wear and use.

Much of their equipment is indistinguishable from that supplied to the military, not least because much of it is military surplus.

=== Weapons ===
==== Current ====
Name	Type	Origin	Notes	References
Glock knife	Combat knife	Austria	FM81 variant used; 69 Commando insignia carved at sheath and its blade	
Glock pistol	Semi-automatic pistol	Austria	19 variant used; current standard issue	
SIG Sauer SP2022	Semi-automatic pistol	Switzerland		
Benelli M3	Combat shotgun	Italy		
Remington 1100	Combat shotgun	United States		
CZ Scorpion Evo 3	Submachine gun	Czech Republic	Fitted with various different optics.	
Heckler & Koch MP5	Submachine gun	Germany	A3, A5, K-A3, SD3 variants used; fitted with Surefire underbarrel flashlights (for A3/A5) and EOTech 553 holographic weapon sight optics	
Heckler & Koch MP7	Personal defense weapon	Germany	A1 variant used	
Colt M4 APC	Assault rifle	United States Malaysia	Malaysian-produced P0923 variant used; Fitted with EOTech 553 holographic weapon sight optics.	
Steyr AUG	Assault rifle	Austria	A3 variant in limited use	
Colt M4A1	Assault rifle	United States	Fitted with EOTech 553 holographic weapon sight optics.	
Heckler & Koch HK416	Assault rifle	Germany	Fitted with EOTech 553 holographic weapon sight optics.	
FN SCAR-H	Battle rifle	Belgium	Fitted with EOTech 553 holographic weapon sight optics.	
Accuracy International PM	Sniper rifle	United Kingdom		
Accuracy International AXMC	Sniper rifle	United Kingdom		
Barrett M107A1	Sniper rifle	United States		
Remington 700P	Sniper rifle	United States		
M60 machinegun	General purpose machine gun	United States	E1 variant in use	
M203 grenade launcher	Grenade launcher	United States		
Arsenal ATGL-L	Anti-tank weapon	Bulgaria		

==== Retired ====
Name	Type	Origin	Notes
Browning Hi Power	Semi-automatic pistol	Belgium	
Heckler & Koch P9S	Semi-automatic pistol	West Germany	
Colt M1911A1	Semi-automatic pistol	United States	
L1A1 Self Loading Rifle	Battle rifle	United Kingdom	
Heckler & Koch G3	Battle rifle	West Germany	Used by marksmen in 80's to 90's
M16 rifle	Assault rifle	United States	Currently used in training course and for display
Armalite AR-18	Assault rifle	United States	
Heckler & Koch HK33	Assault rifle	West Germany	
M72 LAW	Grenade launcher	United States	

=== Tactical vehicles ===
As a special forces unit, the 69 Commando employs a number of specialised vehicles to accomplish its missions.

These include the Commando V-150D and the GKN Sankey AT105 armoured personnel carriers equipped with M60s as assault vehicles in urban and jungle terrain.

69 Commando also uses modified police MPV (Mobile Patrol Vehicles), vans, trucks, 4WD and buses for use as tactical vehicles, which included but are not limited to the Land Rover Defender, Ford Ranger RIV and Mitsubishi Pajero.

PGK also employs RHIB assault boats, jet-skis and Marine Subskimmer (DPV) in maritime missions and amphibious insertions.

For its airborne operations, 69 Commando utilises the C-130 Hercules, Cessna 206G, Cessna 208 Caravan 1 and Pilatus Porter PC-6 aircraft as well as the E-Squirrel AS-355 F2/AS-355N helicopter.

=== Development and acquisitions ===
On 25 October 2007, the US Joint Interagency Task Force (JIATF) West funded RM2 million state-of-the-art shooting house for the VAT 69 Commando battalion was opened.

69 Commando will get their own base after 47 years sharing base with the General Operations Force Northern Brigade. The new base estimated to be fully operational in 2017.

== Killed in the line of duty ==
Rank/Service No.	Name	Date	Circumstances
Insp I/3427 ("Task Force")	Mohd Zabri Abdul Hamid SP	4 September 1975	He was fatally injured after stepping on a booby trap while intercepting and tracking communist guerrillas responsible for the murder of four Extra Police Constables in Grik, Perak. Following his death, he was posthumously promoted to the rank of Assistant Superintendent of Police. In recognition of his bravery and leadership, he was awarded the Grand Knight of Valour (SP), which is Malaysia's highest and most prestigious gallantry decoration.
PC 62209	Mandi s/o Itam Tambo	29 August 1978	He was killed in action (KIA) during Operations Hentam Sedar 4 in Kulim, Kedah.
PC 62195	Bah Tradel s/o Din	9 October 1978	He was KIA during Operations Setia 21/78 in Tapah, Bidor.
PC 71933	Yub bin Gedu	28 January 1980	He was KIA during the Operation Setia 2/80 at Tanah Hitam, Chemor, Perak.
PC 67574 ("Task Force")	Zainuddin Hassan	9 September 1984	They were KIA by a communist sniper while assisting a Police Field Force unit that had been trapped in an ambush by communist guerrillas in the Ulu Kinta jungle, Perak.
Cpl 52260	Mansor Zainuddin	9 September 1984	They were KIA by a communist sniper while assisting a Police Field Force unit that had been trapped in an ambush by communist guerrillas in the Ulu Kinta jungle, Perak.
Corporal	Ismail Ibrahim	2000	They were killed in a fatal parachuting accident during a basic training course at the Pasukan Gerak Khas "B" Training Facility in Ulu Kinta, Perak.
Cpl 110992	Idrus Johar	2000	They were killed in a fatal parachuting accident during a basic training course at the Pasukan Gerak Khas "B" Training Facility in Ulu Kinta, Perak.
Insp G/17992	Zulkifli Mamat	1 March 2013	They were KIA during an ambush by Sulu terrorists while hunting down a terrorist group in Lahad Datu, Sabah.
Cpl 113088	Sabaruddin Daud	1 March 2013	They were KIA during an ambush by Sulu terrorists while hunting down a terrorist group in Lahad Datu, Sabah.
Inspector	Khairil Azhar Kamaruddin	22 January 2026	He drowned during an underwater combat diving training exercise in Semporna, Sabah.

== Missions ==
=== Operation Dawn ===
Its first counter-terrorism mission, which is one of the most well-known and which established the unit's reputation as an elite unit, was an operation known as "Operasi Subuh"/"Operasi Khas 304" (Operations Dawn/Special Operation 304). It was carried out on 3 July 2000 against the militants of Al-Ma'unah who had stolen ninety-seven M16 rifles, two Steyr AUG rifles, four General Purpose Machine Guns (GPMG), six light machine guns (LMG), five M203 grenade launchers, twenty-six bayonet daggers and thousands of ammunition rounds from two control posts of the Territorial Army (Askar Wataniah) camp in Kuala Rui, Perak and captured two police officers, one army special forces soldier and one villager as hostages and planned to commit treason against a democratically elected government.

In the dawn of 5 July 2000, police and military units created a distraction, while members of the PGK led by 69 Commando Battalion leader ASP Abd Razak Mohd Yusof, accompanied by the 21st Special Service Group led by Malaysian Army senior officer Lt. Gen. (Ret.) Zaini Mohamad Said, were sent to Sauk to negotiate with the Al-Ma'unah leader, Mohamed Amin Mohamed Razali.

Amin, along with his comrades, were persuaded to drop their arms and surrender to the security forces. Although most of the group initially surrendered, negotiations eventually broke down and a bloody gunfight ensued. In these incidents, 2 of the 4 hostages were killed before the group finally surrendered. The security forces suffered two casualties – police Special Branch officer Detective Corporal R. Sanghadevan and Trooper Matthew anak Medan from the 22nd Commando Regiment were tortured before they were killed and was buried by 2 other hostages, Sergeant (R) Mohd Shah Ahmad and civilian Jaafar Puteh, in the jungle before they were both rescued by the security forces. Abdul Halim Ali @ Ahmad, a member of the militant group, was shot dead in the firefight and five others were injured, including two seriously. The other 22 were taken into police custody. Mohamed Amin, Zahit Muslim, Jemari Jusoh and Jamaludin Darus were later sentenced to death and the other 16 were sentenced to life imprisonment. 10 more comrades, Megat Mohamed Hanafi Ilias, Muhamad Nukhshah Bandi Che Mansor, Riduan Berahim, Azlan Abdul Ghani, Shahidi Ali and Khairul Anuar Mohamed Ariffin, were sentenced by the High Court to ten years in jail each after pleading guilty to an alternative charge under Section 122 for preparing to wage war against the King of Malaysia after they pleaded guilty to the lesser charge.

=== Publicly known missions ===
- 1970s: 69 Commandos led by ASP Zabri Abd Hamid together with Indonesian Army KOSTRAD combated the PARAKU in Kalimantan jungles.
- 1994: One of the Philippine MNLF organisations, Rizal Aleh and his father escaped from the Philippines and hid in a village of Sabah where he started piracy activities. 69 Commandos led by DSP Mohd Noor Razak within operations code-named Ops Rambo II was sent to Sabah to infiltrate him. Mohd Noor was shot by Rizal at his leg during a struggle with him. Both were successfully captured and sentenced by the National Court after pleading guilty for his criminal activities in Sabah. Later, both Rizal and his father were sent back to the Philippines Government.
- 1998: The Pasukan Gerakan Khas and the Grup Gerak Khas were deployed to provide security and were on standby for hostage rescue, close protection and counter-terrorism duties during the 1998 Commonwealth Games held at National Stadium, Bukit Jalil, Kuala Lumpur on 11 to 21 September 1998.
- 20 September 1998: In the twilight hours, by orders from the then Prime Minister to the Inspector-General of Police, Tan Sri Rahim Noor, 69th Commando PGK operatives led by Inspector Mazlan arrested the ex-Deputy Prime Minister Dato' Sri Anwar Ibrahim in his home 18 days after his ejection from the Cabinet, for inciting anti-Mahathir reforms in Kuala Lumpur. He was initially arrested under the Internal Security Act and was subsequently charged with, and convicted of, corruption and sodomy. 6 years later in 2004 when he was serving his jail sentence for sodomy after completing his sentence for corruption, he was released when his sodomy conviction was overturned by the Federal Court in the case of Dato' Seri Anwar b. Ibrahim & Sukma Darmawan Sasmitaat Madja Lwn. Pendakwa Raya.
- 5 July 2000: The militant group Al-Ma'unah stole thousands of military firearms and planned to commit treason against a democratically elected government. The members of 69 Commando and the 22nd GGK stormed the group's camp at Sauk, Malaysia and rescued two hostages while two other hostages were killed.
- 12 September 2002: Ahmad Mohd Arshad or Mat Komando, 37, the leader of Gang 13, then No. 1 on the Malaysian Most-Wanted-Criminal list for 52 armed robberies involving about RM2.5 million, armed assault and illegal possession of firearms (among others), was known to be hiding in a Kampung Hujung Keton, the village in the state of Kedah on the west coast of the Malay Peninsula. Armed with intelligence gathered from surveillance and villagers, 10 police officers from 69 Commando anti-terror police, supported by the GOF paramilitary police, cordoned off the area and stormed a hut in the village for the takedown. Sensing the presence of law enforcement officials in dawn 12, 6 September.30 am, Mat Komando opened fire and in the ensuing shoot-out, was shot in the head and left ribs and was killed. The police seized a Colt .45 pistol with three rounds of ammunition and a S&W Model 617 .22 revolver with two rounds of ammunition, two bullet shells from the deceased criminal. The then Malaysian Inspector-General of Police, Tan Sri Norian Mai (Retired), said that Mat Komando was the fourth member of the Gang 13 members to be killed in shoot-outs against police while the remaining nine members had been arrested.
- Participated in hostage rescue operations against Abu Sayyaf in Sipadan Island (Pulau Sipadan) and Ligitan Island (Pulau Ligitan), Sabah with support from GOF, the Malaysian Armed Forces and Philippine Armed Forces.
- 2003: Arrested six Jemaah Islamiyah suspect terrorists, Mohd Khaider Kadran (JI leader), Wan Amin Wan Hamat, Sulaiman Suramin, Sufian Salih, Ahmad Muaz Al Bakry and Hasim Talib.
- 16 October 2003/17 October 2003: Involved in VVIP protection of the Islamic leaders during the 10th Organisation of the Islamic Conference (OIC) in Putrajaya.
- 16 December 2004: Participated in the search and rescue mission for the lost Indonesian BRIMOB, in which 700 personnel from the POLRI special operations force units went missing in Acheh after the tsunami incident.
- 23 August 2005: Five officers and 32 members of the 69 Commandos of PGK counter-terrorist operatives flown to Kukup, Pontian for the intercept operations of a ship seized the Panama-registered 567-tonne vessel MV Natris which was renamed MV Paulijing, laden with soybeans and vinegar, believed to run off Batam waters, Indonesia. The ship was detected by the Marine Operations Force in the Malacca Straits after reported missing in 2003. This operation was named Operation MV Paulijing. The operation also involves members of the SWAT units of the Marine Operations Force which resulting arrested 20 Chinese crews including the captain when they refused to heed to the order by the police authorities.
- 2006: Deployed as part of the United Nations (U.N.) INTERFET to support the Operation Astute. It consisted of Malaysian U.N. 10 Paratrooper Brigade, Grup Gerak Khas, Australian and New Zealand U.N Armed Forces in Timor Leste.
- July 2007: Deployed in a search and rescue operation after a Sikorsky S61 Nuri helicopter of the RMAF went down along with a crew of six near Genting Sempah, Genting Highlands. The SAR team, which consisted of the U.S. Navy Air Fleet from U.S.S. Jarrett, 10 Paratrooper Brigade, the 22nd GGK, PASKAU, the Police's General Operations Force Senoi Praaq, Police Air Wing, Fire and Rescue Department, Forestry Department rangers, Civil Defense Department (JPA3) and the villagers, located the wreckage of the helicopter at 1324 hrs on 17 July 2007 with its rotor blades detached. The bodies of all crew members were found in the cabin of the stricken aircraft.
- 2010: Intercepted the Sultan of Kelantan's motorcade (escorts) 30m outside of the Kelantan Royal Palace as they were heading for the Sultan Ismail Petra Airport to depart for Singapore pending further treatment at Mount Elizabeth Hospital. The team then brought the Sultan, himself not willingly, to the nearby hospital (HUSM) somewhere 200m from the Palace.
- 2013: Deployed in Lahad Datu, Sabah during the Lahad Datu conflict. The 69 Commando members were involved in hunting down a terrorist group, numbering approximately 200 in strength, from the self-styled "Royal Security Forces of the Sultanate of Sulu and North Borneo," while UTK members were deployed in urban and populated areas to defend them. The commandos were the main assault team during the early stage of the conflict. Two officers were gunned down and three more wounded in an unexpected "white flag" ambush by the Sulu terrorists, while 12 of the terrorists were shot to death in retaliation and three other terrorists were fatally wounded.
- 2 March 2013: Officers and members of the 69 Commandos who were deployed to Lahad Datu as reinforcements rescued police officers who were trapped in an ambush by less than ten Sulu terrorists in Kampung Seri Jaya Siminul, Semporna. The terrorists, armed with AK-47 and M16 rifles, had ambushed the officers during a surveillance operation. In the ambush, six officers were downed, while six terrorists also killed after the officers launched the counter-attack.
- 19 May 2015: A team of roughly 300 operators from the 69 Commandos were deployed to the Malaysia–Thailand border to search and curb the human trafficking activities in the region.

== Notable members ==
Many VAT 69 commandos have received decorations for bravery and gallantry. Aside from that, some VAT 69 commandos have done many notable things that have etched their names in history.

- A. Navaratnam PJN – Datuk Navaratnam Appadurai is a retired senior police officer distinguished for his leadership as a commanding officer of VAT 69 and as the inaugural commander of the Special Actions Unit (UTK). One of the original pioneers of VAT 69, he completed the unit's foundational commando course under the instruction of the British SAS in 1969. Throughout his career, he participated in several high-profile operations, including the 1985 Memali incident and the hostage crises at Pudu Prison in 1986 and Kuantan Prison in 1987. He retired in 1988 at the rank of Senior Assistant Commissioner of Police. For his contributions toward the 1989 Hat Yai Peace Agreement, which concluded the Communist insurgency in Malaysia, he was appointed a Commander of the Order of Meritorious Service (PJN) by the King of Malaysia in 2012, carrying the title of Datuk.
- Abdul Rashid Harun – Dato' Abdul Rashid bin Harun is a retired senior police officer distinguished for his leadership during the 2013 Lahad Datu standoff, also known as Operation Daulat, in Sabah. As the commanding officer of the Pasukan Gerak Khas during the conflict, he was directly involved in field-level reconnaissance and occasionally disguised himself as a lower-ranking officer to gather intelligence. He retired in 2017 at the rank of Commissioner of Police, a three-star appointment, and holds the distinction of being the highest-ranking officer from the 69 Commando unit in the history of the Royal Malaysia Police. He is the inspiration for the character SAC Datuk Mizan, portrayed by actor Riezman Khuzaimi in the 2024 film Takluk: Lahad Datu.
- Abdul Razak Mohd Yusof SP – Dato' Abdul Razak bin Mohd Yusof (Service number: G/10958) is a retired senior officer of the VAT 69 commando unit and a recipient of the Grand Knight of Valour (SP), Malaysia's highest gallantry award. He was honoured in 2001 for his pivotal role in Operation Dawn, or Ops Subuh, which addressed the al-Ma'unah arms heist. During the operation, then-ASP Abdul Razak and his team infiltrated the group's stronghold, where he successfully persuaded the leader, Mohamed Amin Mohamed Razali, to surrender without further bloodshed. He concluded his career in 2023 at the rank of Deputy Commissioner of Police (DCP), a two-star appointment, making him one of the most highly decorated police officers in the nation's history.
- Ada Kulim PGB – Ada bin Kulim is a member of the VAT 69 Commando unit of Orang Asli descent. On 26 March 1998, he and members of his squadron were tasked with escorting a Royal Malaysia Police Federal Reserve Unit (FRU) convoy transporting illegal immigrants from Aceh to an immigration detention depot in Semenyih, Selangor. Following a riot at the facility, several FRU members were taken hostage by the detainees. Despite possessing limited riot control equipment, Ada, then a Lance Corporal, entered the depot with his team and successfully rescued the captured personnel. During the operation, he sustained severe head injuries. For his bravery during the hostage rescue, he was awarded the Star of the Commander of Valour (PGB) in 1998. He currently holds the rank of Sergeant Major and serves within the 3rd (Senoi Praaq) Battalion of the General Operations Force.
- Apot Saad PGB – Apot anak Saad was a renowned tracker and law enforcement officer who served in both the Senoi Praaq and the 69 Commando units. Throughout the Malayan Emergency and the Second Communist Insurgency, his expertise led to his attachment to various elite Commonwealth units, including the British Royal Marines, the Australian SASR, and the New Zealand SAS. For his exceptional service and contributions to national security, he was decorated with the Star of the Commander of Valour (PGB), the nation's second-highest gallantry award. He retired at the rank of Sergeant Major and died on 14 September 2024 due to pneumonia.
- Halim Ishak – Dato' Seri Halim bin Ishak is a former VAT 69 combat diver who participated in the cross-border operation to arrest the wanted Filipino suspect Rizal Aleh on 21 July 1994. In 2017, he served as a member of the negotiating team that engaged with Nur Misuari and sub-leaders of the Abu Sayyaf group in the Philippines to secure the release of Malaysian hostages. Following his retirement from the Royal Malaysia Police, Halim founded the Malaysian Community Care Foundation. Through this non-governmental organisation, he remains an active advocate for various social and national issues, including illegal immigration, economic stability, and the fight against corruption.
- Mohd Noor Razak PGB – Mohd Noor bin Razak is a former 69 Commando operative who was awarded the Star of the Commander of Valour (PGB) in 1996 for his actions during Operation Rambo II. On 21 July 1994, in Sandakan, Sabah, he played a key role in the arrest of the wanted Filipino suspect Rizal Aleh, who had previously led the siege of Cawa-Cawa Camp in Zamboanga City. He retired at the rank of Deputy Commissioner of Police (DCP) and currently serves as the president of the 69 Commando Veterans Association, representing the interests of retired members of the unit.
- Mohd Zabri Abdul Hamid SP– Mohd Zabri bin Abdul Hamid (Service number: G/3427) was a member of the pioneer 69 Commando team and served as the officer commanding the 3rd Platoon, Task Force, during the Communist insurgency. In 1975, he was fatally wounded by a booby trap during a manhunt mission in Grik, Perak. Despite his injuries, he continued to issue orders to ensure the safety of his personnel, including two team members who had been wounded earlier in the operation. For his leadership and selfless conduct, he was posthumously promoted to Assistant Superintendent of Police (ASP). In 2014, he was further honoured with the posthumous award of the Grand Knight of Valour (SP), Malaysia's highest gallantry decoration.

== In popular culture ==
Books, television & film .

- 2001: "The Spear and the Kerambit: The Exploits of VAT 69, Malaysia's Elite Fighting Force, 1968-1989" is a historical account written by Datuk Navaratnam Appadurai, a former commanding officer of the unit. Published by Utusan Publications, the book chronicles the history of VAT 69 and the author's personal experiences during the Communist insurgency in Malaysia.
- 2005: "VAT 69 - Warisan Darah Perwira" is a docudrama by Astro and directed by late Senator, Dato' Jins Shamsuddin. It is about tactics and professionalism of VAT 69.
- 2010: "VAT 69: Malaysia's Very Able Troopers " is a documentary by History Channel Asia about VAT 69 history and early formations.
- 2011: "Wira Padang Pasir" is a TV drama by Astro, about an ex-VAT 69 turn UTK operator now working as a Malaysian Embassy bodyguard in Cairo, Egypt.
- 2024: "Takluk: Lahad Datu" is a police action film directed by Zulkarnain Azhar. The film is about VAT 69 involved based on 2013 Lahad Datu standoff.

== See also ==
- Elite Forces of Malaysia
  - Gerak Khas – Special Forces of the Malaysian Army
  - Naval Special Forces – Special Forces of the Royal Malaysian Navy
  - RMAF Special Forces – Special Forces of the Royal Malaysian Air Force
  - Special Tasks and Rescue Team – Special Forces of the Malaysia Coast Guard
  - 10th Parachute Brigade – Malaysian Army Special Operations Infantry
- Pasukan Gerakan Khas
  - Special Actions Unit – 69 Commando's sister unit specialised in urban warfare. One of Special Forces unit of the Royal Malaysia Police
- Border Patrol Police Aerial Reinforcement Unit – Thailand elite police unit specialised in unconventional warfare, airborne, and jungle operations
- Comandos Jungla – The premier counter-narcotics unit of the Colombian National Police, specialised in airmobile operations and jungle warfare
- Commando Battalion for Resolute Action – A specialised unit of the Indian Central Reserve Police Force (CRPF) trained in guerrilla and jungle warfare
- Special Action Force – An elite tactical paramilitary unit of the Philippine National Police trained in both jungle and urban warfare
