= Sauk Siege =

2000 Malaysian coup attempt

- Part of the Operation Dawn (Malaysia) or Operations 304 (Ops Subuh or Operasi Khas 304) and Terrorism in Malaysia
Date	5 July 2000
Location	Bukit Jenalik, Sauk, Perak, Malaysia
Result	Malaysia security forces victory: Militant failure; Arrest and execution of Al-Maunah's leaders

Belligerents
Al Ma'unah terrorist group	Malaysia: Malaysian Army; Royal Malaysia Police

Commanders and leaders
Muhammad Amin Mohamed Razali (executed); Zahit Muslim (executed); Jamaludin Darus (executed)	Lt. General Zaini Mohd Said; ASP Abdul Razak Mohd Yusof

Strength
Al-Ma'unah terrorist: 32	Malaysian Army: 59: Kor Armor DiRaja: 4; 22nd GGK: 43; Police: unknown: VAT-69 PGK: 20; GOF: unknown

Casualties and losses
KIA: 1 dead WIA: 5 Detainees: 22	Coalition: 2 hostages killed (Army GGK: 1, Police: 1); Rescuer: 2 hostages (Police: 1 and Civilian: 1)
- Civilian casualties No consensus on the figure of civilian casualties.

The Sauk Siege (Malay: Pengepungan Sauk) was a military standoff that happened on 3-5 July 2000. It was an attempted coup d'état against the Yang di-Pertuan Agong and Malaysian Government by Al-Ma'unah led by Muhammad Amin Mohamed Razali.

The group was made famous by their audacious raid on 2 July 2000 on a camp of Malaysian Army Reserve in the early hours of the morning and stealing weapons from the armoury. The group was later cornered in the village of Sauk, Kuala Kangsar, Perak and was involved in a stand-off against the Malaysian Army and Royal Malaysian Police forces. The siege was ended when Malaysian security forces, including the army 22nd Grup Gerak Khas (22nd GGK) and police VAT 69 Pasukan Gerakan Khas, stormed the camp in Operation Dawn (Operasi Subuh & Operasi 304,305).

== Event ==
Mohamed Amin Mohamed Razali led a band of 29 Al-Ma'unah members in a mission to overthrow the Malaysian government. The group included a serving Major in the Royal Malaysian Air Force. They dressed up in uniforms of senior army officers and claimed to be making a surprise inspection of the 304th Malaysian Army Reserve (Rejimen Askar Wataniah) camp at the Temenggor Dam in Gerik, Perak. The group tricked their way through and raided the armouries.

They had previously obtained military fatigues from various outlets and securing three units of Mitsubishi Pajero four-wheel-drive vehicles. The Pajero, of similar make to that used by the Malaysian Army was painted green and given false number plate at a house rented in the town of Kati, for the specific use as a transit point for the group.

In the early hours of 2 July 2000, 20 members of the Al-Maunah group got into three Pajero vehicles and proceeded to Post 2 Kuala Rhui Camp at 2.50 a.m. and then to Camp Bn 304 Rejimen Askar Wataniah at 4.15 a.m.

They talked their way into the Camps by feigning a surprise inspection, to conduct emergency spot checks of all the weapons and ammunition stored at both camps. Impressed by the manner in Amin and the others conducted themselves and assured by the presence of the three Pajero vehicles bearing the military registration numbers beginning with the letter 'Z', the military personnel at the two army camps were duped into allowing the group to take possession of all but one of the various army weapons, ammunition and other army equipment including communication equipment and some even helped the group to carry the weapons into the three Pajeros. They took away a huge cache of firearms and ammunition, including 97 M16 assault rifles, two Steyr AUG rifles, four GPMGs, six light machine guns, five grenade launchers, 182 M16 magazines, eight extra barrels of GPMGs, three extra barrel of LMGs, 26 bayonets, 9,095 rounds of 5.56mm and 60 rounds of 40mm ammunition.

27 of them hid themselves in the jungle in Bukit Jenalik, Sauk, near Kuala Kangsar, in Perak. Amin then distributed the seized arms to his members for practice. The unusual sounds of firearms alerted local inhabitants who alerted the Police. The group made preparations for the operation, including collecting food supplies and taking them to their base in Bukit Jenalik. The food dumps were to keep the base going for about three weeks. They collected weapons such as parang (machete) and cross bows for the purpose of their mission.

Police threw a containment cordon on Bukit Jenalik. A number of security personnel were deployed to penetrate the Al-Ma'unah's camp. However, two of the police personnel Sergeant (Sarjan) Mohd Shah Ahmad and Detective Corporal Raju Saghadevan, as well as civilian Jaafar Puteh and an army personnel, Corporal Matthew anak Medan, were taken hostage by Al-Ma'unah. In a radio communication with the authorities, the group stated their intention to cordon off Kuala Lumpur if their demand for Prime Minister Mahathir Mohamad to resign in 24 hours was unmet. Jaafar Puteh was a civilian who wandered into their camp while looking for durian fruit.

Mohd Shah Ahmad related during the trial that over the four days, the security personnel were abused and tortured. They were made to dig trenches along the sides of Bukit Jenalik to serve as a defence in the event of an attack on the camp. At night, they were tied to a durian tree. It was that Mohd Shah and Sanghadevan buried Corporal Matthew in one of these trenches. Trooper Matthews was apprehended by Jemari Jusoh and when Amin realised the identity of Corporal Matthew, Amin tortured Matthew by shooting his leg. Amin then ordered the Jemari Jusoh to shoot Matthew in cold blood.

On the morning of 5 July 2000, a member of Al Ma'unah, Abu Bakar Ismail was shot by the security forces. In retaliation, Amin and his followers returned fire against the security forces. During this cross fire, Saghadevan was shot dead (Mohd Shah claimed that Amin shot Saghadevan in the head twice). Saghadevan was buried next to Trooper Matthews by Mohd Shah and Jaafar Puteh.

== Surrender ==
Al-Ma'unah later surrendered, and the leaders brought to trial for "waging war upon the King." The Malaysian Government acted against the Al-Ma'unah group only after giving it every chance to surrender and retained public support by giving the Al-Ma'unah members fair trials and re-integrating them into society.

Mohamed Amin Mohamed Razali was the last to surrender. Just before doing so, he grabbed the Malaysian Army Field Commander, Lieutenant General Zaini Mohd Said by his shirt and tried to shoot him at point-blank range. The General flicked the barrel of Amin's assault rifle and the bullet hit one of the militants. Zaini was later awarded the Seri Pahlawan Gagah Perkasa (S.P.) award for his bravery and contribution in ending the siege without further loss of life.

Lieutenant General Zaini Mohamad Said went up the hill with 43 Army Commando personnel in four armoured personnel carriers followed by 16 infantrymen after Deputy Superintendent of Police, Abd Razak bin Mohd Yusoff, and his VAT 69 Commando team spent two odd hours negotiated and persuaded Amin to surrender. Later, DSP Abd Razak bin Mohd Yusoff informed Zaini that the Al-Ma'unah's group leader has agreed to surrender. When they reached there, about 15 Al-Ma'unah members surrendered the stolen weapons, but refused to give up their parangs which they claimed to be inscribed with Quran verses until relented later. Abd Razak bin Mohd Yusoff was also awarded the Seri Pahlawan Gagah Perkasa for his bravery as a role of mediator in the incident. Razak was the officer-in-charge of the Parachute Branch, Pasukan Gerakan Khas, Royal Malaysian Police.

== Deaths ==
Three people were killed before the group finally surrendered. Detective Corporal R. Saghadevan of the Special Branch was killed, some claimed he was executed, during the siege. The group also killed an Army commando, Corporal Mathew anak Medan, who was shot by Jemari Jusoh. Both were tortured before they were killed. The third person killed was a group member who was shot and killed when he refused to retreat.

== Grenade attacks ==
Mohamed Amin Mohamed Razali also sent members to bomb the Anchor and Carlsberg breweries in Petaling Jaya and Shah Alam near Kuala Lumpur and the Hindu temple in Batu Caves. Only minor damage was done. Members of the group, Shahidi and Roslan, later admitted to attacking the Carlsberg brewery on the outskirts of Kuala Lumpur with M203 grenade launcher grenade launchers stolen from the army camps, according Shahidi and Roslan during trial court when ask by Deputy Public Prosecutor.

== Trial and sentence ==
Mohamed Amin and his group were brought to trial for charges of " war against the King," and became the first people convicted of such offence in Malaysia. Amin and his two men, Zahit Muslim (ex-police VAT-69 commando) and Jamaluddin Darus, were sentenced to death. Sixteen others were given life sentences. In June 2003, the Federal Court turned down Mohamed Amin's appeal for life imprisonment and confirmed the death sentence on him for waging war against the King.

Megat Mohamed Hanafi Ilias, Muhamad Nukhshah Bandi Che Mansor, Riduan Berahim, Azlan Abdul Ghani, Shahidi Ali and Khairul Anuar Mohamed Ariffin, were sentenced by the High Court to ten years in jail after pleading guilty to treason, a lesser charge. They were originally charged with waging war against the King, an offence that carries the death penalty or life imprisonment. Instead, they accepted a guilty plea in a reduced charge of preparing to wage war against the King, which refers to collecting or attempting to collect men, arms or ammunition with the intention of waging war.

15 Al-Mau'nah detainees were released from the detention of the Internal Security Act (ISA) on 24 November 2003, however the release came with a string of conditions which included restricted residence to a particular district, the need to report to police weekly, and a 9 pm to 6 pm curfew.

== Execution of Mohamed Amin Mohamed Razali ==
Mohamed Amin Mohamed Razali, as the ringleader of a militant group, was hanged at the Sungai Buloh Prison in Selangor on 4 August 2006, as reported by Bernama news agency. Zahit Muslim, Jamaluddin Darus, and Jemari Jusoh were hanged a week earlier.

== Pardon ==
On 31 August 2020, the 63rd Merdeka day, Yang di-Pertuan Agong Sultan Abdullah announced that he has granted pardon to 13 Al-Maunah convicts who were sentenced to life imprisonment on the grounds of their good behaviour in prison. In a statement, he wished that the 13 convicts will "reflect on their mistakes, repent and evaluate their relationship with God, their families and society".

One pardoned Al-Maunah convict, Mohd Ramli Mahmood, also known by the nickname "Abang Li" or "Abe Li", expressed his gratitude to the King's pardon. He revealed that he was first placed in Sungai Buloh Prison, then Kajang Prison, then Pengkalan Chepa Prison, and finally in Machang Moral Rehabilitation Centre before being released. During his imprisonment, he studied religion, learnt sewing skill and gave religious lessons to new inmates. After release, he said all he wants now is to spend quality time with his wife and eight children, and to take care of his mother, Fatimah Ab Rahman, who is already 98 years old in 2020, to try and make up for the time lost.

In an interview with Bernama in 2024, Mohd Ramli Mahmood claimed that when he joined Al-Maunah at the age of 47 upon the invitation of his friend, he thought the group was only about learning traditional healing and silat. He hope that youngsters will not be easily influenced by the trend of teachings or new movements that can destroy the harmony of the country.

Another pardoned convict, by the pseudonym "Ahmad", is also grateful to the King's pardon. He is glad that his and his mother's prayer for his release has been answered. Ahmad has served his life sentence for 1 year in Sungai Buloh Prison, then for 10 years in Kajang Prison, then for 8 years in Pengkalan Chepa Prison, and transferred back to Kajang Prison again for 42 days before being finally released. During his time in prison, he has further his studies on Islam and the Quran, and learning the art of making man and woman’s clothing in 2002. After being released in 2020, Ahmad planned to provide tailoring service from home as his income source and to support his mother, who has become bedridden since 2017.

Another pardoned inmate, also by the fictional name "Ahmad", in an interview with Bernama after his release in 2020, recounts his shock with the significant change in technology and the surroundings of his hometown in Kuala Berang after 20 years, and also the emotional moment when he was instructed by the prison officers to read his pardon letter. He was imprisoned in Sungai Buloh Prison since 2000, then in Kajang Prison for 8 years, then finally for another 12 years in Marang Prison from 2008 until his release. He also learnt how to make furniture during his prison times. When questioned about his immediate future plan, he stated that he has received a job offer but has yet to make a decision, as he wish to take a rest at the moment and to repay the favor of his family, especially his elder sister who supported and visited him when he was in prison. Ahmad also said one of the first things he did after his release was visiting his parents' graves, as they died while he was in prison.

== See also ==
- Capital punishment in Malaysia
