= Mohd Zabri Abdul Hamid =

Mohd Zabri Abdul Hamid SP PPT
- Born: 15 August 1937; Tapah, Perak, Federated Malay States, British Malaya
- Died: 4 September 1975 (aged 38); Grik, Perak, Malaysia
- Burial place: Tapah, Perak
- Spouse: Che Manis @ Latifah Binte Abdullah
- Military career
- Allegiance: Malaysia
- Branch: Royal Malaysia Police
- Service years: 1963–1975
- Rank: Assistant Superintendent of Police
- Service number: G/3427
- Unit: Task Force (VAT 69)
- Commands: 3rd Platoon, 69 Commando
- Conflicts: Communist insurgency in Malaysia
- Awards: Seri Pahlawan Gagah Perkasa (S.P.)

Mohd Zabri Bin Abdul Hamid was a police officer most remembered as a member and officer of the Royal Malaysia Police 69 Commandos of the Pasukan Gerakan Khas.

== Background ==
Mohd Zabri was born in Tapah, Perak on 15 August 1937 and was the second child of nine siblings from the couple Abdul Hamid and Mahiyah binti Mohd Shah. He received his early education from Tapah Malay School and then continued his studies at the English Government School, Tapah until he completed Senior Cambridge. After passing the Cambridge Senior examination, he began his early career as a teacher in Slim River in 1958.

In 1959, he worked as a junior officer in the Rubber Research Department, Kuala Lumpur. After completing a course at the Rubber Research Institute, Sungai Buloh, he was then assigned to Masjid Tanah, Melaka before being transferred back to Taiping, Perak.

== Police career ==
Mohd Zabri started his career as a police officer on 1 June 1963 as a Probationary Inspector. After passed the training at PULAPOL on Semarak Street, he was assigned as an Investigating Officer at Sentral Police Station, Penang. Here he is responsible for the eradication of gambling, burglary, and theft. He was reassigned to Nibong Tebal Police Station, Penang. Later, he was posted to 3rd Battalion of Police Field Force (now General Operations Force) on 29 March 1965 as Platoon commander. On 1 June 1966, he was promoted to Inspector and continued his duties as Platoon Commander by participating in operations and also as a trainer at the Police Field Force Training School in Kroh, Perak. In July 1970, Zabri joined the VAT 69 Commando and he passed the selection after being trained in five months. Later, he was appointed as a Commando Chief Instructor from April to August 1971 to be trained with new officers and men joining the team which is known as the 3rd 69 Commando Platoon, which was located in Legap Fort, Perak.

Zabri also was committed in an operation which was known as the Ops Jemput Tiga, which jointly operated with the Malaysian Special Branch and the Indonesian Army (TNI-AD) which had special intelligence for hunting down the North Kalimantan Communist Party (PARAKU) which was located at the Sarawak-Kalimantan border. In an operation which was joined by a comprising team which included the 69 Commandos and Kostrad (Strategy Commando Army Proposal) TNI-AD and taken in five months in which both teams had a successful attack on both strongholds of PARAKU's group, the 69 Commandos, which were led by Zabri in the battle, sparked and toppled a few members of the PARAKU on the Indonesian security team.

Besides the Ops Jemput Tiga, Zabri also led the three platoons to Hulu Perak in August 1975 to intercept the communist who was involved in the murder case of four Extra Police Constable members from the Grik Police Station where the four officers were killed. On 3 September 1975, his units succeeded in detecting the enemy camp positions near the Grik and the occurrence of a clash between the 69 Commandos leaderships by Zabri with the communists, which possessed membership of as many as 30 to 40 before the terrorists retreat. In the battle, two officers, Corporal Sheikh Ismail and Corporal Aziz Idris, were wounded during the shootout and the reinforcement to the Tek Tapong Unit from a communications message had been requested. His units then had an outcome of spot-checking on an abandoned communist camp after the battle, in which they seized six filled backpacks of food, clothes, two mortars, 18 explosives, 15 food supply boxes, medicines and a few other goods. Besides, they also re-seized the three service shotguns which were believed that were owned by the four killed Extra Police Constable members.

== Death ==
On 4 September 1975, Zabri was killed when he stepped on a booby-trap which was set up by the communist while taking two wounded members to an extraction point area after an operation of hunting down the communist who killed extra policemen who were sent to the hospital. His right leg was broken and suffered serious wounds, leading to blood loss. He died while giving a message to his team members. His last words were: "In war, there is no room for pity. Either kill or be killed". He was buried in Tapah, Perak.

To commemorate his service, he was promoted as an Assistant Superintendent rank and a 69 Commando training camp in Tasik Banding was named after him.

== Honours ==
In June 2014, Zabri received the Seri Pahlawan Gagah Perkasa (S.P.), the highest and most distinguished Federal award.

- Malaysia :
  - Recipient of the Grand Knight of Valour (S.P.) (2014 - posthumously)
- Perak :
  - Recipient of the Distinguished Conduct Medal (PPT) (1972)

== In media ==
The ASP Zabri's final mission is shown in a documentary by History Channel Asia titled "VAT 69: Malaysia's Very Able Troopers".
