= 21st Special Service Group =

Malaysian Army special operations command

21st Special Services Group
- 21 Grup Gerak Khas ٢١ ڬروڤ ڬرق خاص
- The 21st Special Service Group's beret backing.
- Founded: 1 August 1970; 56 years ago
- Country: Malaysia
- Branch: Malaysian Army
- Type: Special forces command
- Part of: Malaysian Armed Forces
- Headquarters: Camp Sri Iskandar, Johor
- Nicknames: "21 GGK", "GGK", "Grup Gerak Khas", "21st Special Forces Group", "Malaysian Army Special Forces Command"
- Colours: Jungle Green and Caribbean Blue
- March: Gerak Khas
- Mascot: Malayan tiger
- Anniversaries: 1 August
- Engagements: List: Communist insurgency in Malaysia (1968–1989); Bosnian War (1992–1995); UNPROFOR; SFOR; Somali Civil War (1991–Ongoing); United Nations Operation in Somalia II; Operation Restore Hope; Kosovo War (1998–1999); Operation 304; Timor-Leste crisis (2006); Operation Astute; Arab–Israeli conflict (1948–Ongoing); UNIFIL; War in Afghanistan (2001–2021); Operation Enduring Freedom; ISAF; Cross border attacks in Sabah (1962–Ongoing); Operation Daulat

Commanders
- Current commander: Major General Dato' Ahmad Shuhaimi Mat Wajab
- Colonel-in-chief: Sultan Ibrahim Ismail of Johor
- Notable commanders: Borhan Ahmad, Zaini Mohd Said SP, Awie Suboh, Adi Ridzwan Abdullah

Insignia
- Tactical formation patches

The 21st Grup Gerak Khas (Abbr.: 21 GGK, Malay: 21 Gerup Gerak Khas, Jawi: ٢١ ڬروڤ ڬرق خاص), also known as the 21st Special Services Group, serves as the command for the Malaysian Army's special forces, the Grup Gerak Khas. Since 1985, 21 SSG has also been considered the 21st combat brigade within the Malaysian Army, which is reflected in its designation. Operating independently under the Malaysian Army, the unit reports directly to the Chief of Army. (Note: Did not fall under the command of either the eastern or western field commands.) The headquarters of the 21 SSG are located at Camp Sri Iskandar in Mersing, Johor.

On 10 May 2024, Major General Ahmad Shuhaimi Mat Wajab assumed command of the 21 SSG, succeeding Major General Mohd Adi Ridzwan.

== History ==
The 21st Special Service Group, formerly known as Rejimen Pertama Gerak Khas Malaysia or the 1st Malaysian Special Service Regiment, was founded on 1 August 1970, at Camp Sungai Udang in Malacca. (Note: The Malaysian Special Service Unit (MSSU) was a temporary special operations task force, not a permanent unit within the Malaysian Armed Forces. Established in 1965 at Camp Majidee, Johor, the MSSU was later replaced by a permanent unit, the 1st Special Service Regiment, founded in 1970 at Camp Sungai Udang, Malacca.) This unit directly succeeded the Malaysian Army's special operations task force, the Malaysian Special Service Unit (MSSU), and served as the spiritual successor to Malaysia's first modern special forces unit, the Malayan Special Forces. (Note: Several early modern special forces units, such as the Ferret Force and the Malayan Scouts, were established in the region now known as Malaysia. However, these units were created by the British de facto protectorate government, while post-independence Malaya formed its own Malayan Special Forces.)

=== Background ===
Following the conclusion of the Indonesia-Malaysia confrontation in 1966, the army command contemplated disbanding the MSSU. The MSSU, stationed at Camp Sebatang Karah in Negeri Sembilan, was a task force whose members were all commando-trained but belonged to their respective regiments or corps, including some sailors from the Royal Malaysian Navy.

In 1969, the 13 May incident prompted the MSSU's deployment to Kuala Lumpur to secure the weapons depot at Camp Mindef (Malay: Kem Kementah). The unit also worked alongside the Royal Malaysia Police's Special Branch, the country's domestic intelligence agency, to apprehend gang and triad leaders suspected of orchestrating the violence behind the scenes. Due to the MSSU's effectiveness in handling the crisis, military leadership decided against its disbandment.

=== Establishment of the 1st Malaysian Special Service Regiment ===
On 1 August 1970, the Malaysian Army established the 1st Malaysian Special Service Regiment (1 MSSR) to succeed the MSSU. Initially, MSSU personnel remained attached to their original regiments, corps, and branch while operating as a task force. To streamline the unit's structure, by 1973, MSSU personnel who wished to continue serving in special forces had to formally resign from their parent units and enlist in 1 MSSR as full-time members.

On 1 January 1976, in response to the expansion of Malaysia's special forces, the 2nd Malaysian Special Service Regiment (2 MSSR) was formed. Additionally, on 1 August 1976, the Special Warfare Training Centre (SWTC) was established to provide commando and special operations training for Gerak Khas. Given its seniority, 1 MSSR personnel were selected as instructors at SWTC. Around this time, the 1 MSSR headquarters company was also tasked with overseeing and commanding all special forces operations within the Malaysian Army.

=== Reorganisation and separation from 1 MSSR ===
On 4 April 1980, the Malaysian Army separated the command structure of special forces from 1 MSSR by establishing the Malaysian Special Service Command (Malay: Markas Pemerintahan Gerak Khas) at Camp Imphal in Kuala Lumpur. (Note: The official name in Bahasa Melayu is Markas Pemerintahan Gerak Khas, but it is commonly shortened to Markas Gerak Khas.) The majority of leadership from the 1 MSSR headquarters company was transferred to the new command, while 1 MSSR and 2 MSSR continued to operate as combat units.

Subsequently, on 1 April 1981, the Malaysian Army renamed the Malaysian Special Service Command to the Malaysian Special Service Group (MSSG). At the same time, 1 MSSR was redesignated as the 21st Para Commando Regiment, and 2 MSSR became the 22nd Para Commando Regiment.

Simultaneously, two new counter-revolutionary warfare and military intelligence units were formed: the 11th Special Service Regiment (11 SSR) and the 12th Special Service Regiment (12 SSR), with the purpose of providing specialised support to the Para Commando regiments. In December 1981, numerous support units were established to provide additional combat support to the combat units under MSSG. However, in 1983, the 12 SSR was disbanded, and the 11 SSR was no longer exclusively assigned to the 21st Para Commando Regiment.

=== Renaming to the 21st Special Service Group ===
In 1985, MSSG was rebranded as the 21st Special Service Group (21 SSG) as part of the Malaysian Army's efforts to standardise unit designations and formally recognise it as the 21st brigade within the army. This restructuring also led to the renaming of its combat units: the 21st Para Commando Regiment became the 21st Commando Regiment (21 CDO), and the 22nd Para Commando Regiment became the 22nd Commando Regiment (22 CDO).

Additionally, in 1986, the 21st Engineering Squadron of 21 SSG, now known as the 10th Squadron (Parachute), Royal Army Engineer, was transferred to the Malaysian Army's 3rd Infantry Division. In 1995, the Special Warfare Training Centre was placed under the Malaysian Army Training and Doctrine Command.

=== Relocation to Camp Sri Iskandar ===
Camp Sri Iskandar, originally known as Camp Sri Mersing, was purpose-built as a special forces base in Johor. Locally, it is commonly referred to as Camp Iskandar or Kem Iskandar, without the Sri prefix. Located 15 kilometres (9.3 mi) south of Mersing, the camp spans 920 hectares (9.2 km^{2}) and features extensive infrastructure, including 200 buildings, 20 kilometres (12 mi) of roads, three bridges, a harbour, helicopter landing pads, parade squares, and other facilities designed to support special operations and begin its construction in 2001. Construction of the base began in 2001.

The 22nd Commando Regiment was the first unit to relocate to the new base in 2004, moving from Camp Erskine in Kuala Kubu Bharu, Selangor. Since then, 21 SSG has gradually transferred its headquarters from Camp Sungai Udang to Camp Sri Iskandar, with the relocation completed in 2009.

Originally named Camp Sri Mersing, the base was later renamed Camp Sri Iskandar in honour of the late Sultan Iskandar of Johor, a strong supporter of Gerak Khas and its former Colonel-in-Chief.

== Structures ==
As a nation that is part of the Commonwealth, the Malaysian military adheres to the traditions of the British Armed Forces. In the case of the 21st Special Service Group, they have adopted the structure of the British Special Air Service, employing the term 'sabre squadron' instead of 'company', unlike other units within the Malaysian Army.

=== 1970–2017 ===
1970–1980

- 1st Malaysian Special Service Regiment (Note: The 1st Malaysian Special Service Regiment also serves as the Malaysian Army's special operations command at the time.)
- 2nd Malaysian Special Service Regiment
- Special Warfare Training Centre

1980–1981

- Malaysian Special Service Command
  - 1st Malaysian Special Service Regiment
  - 2nd Malaysian Special Service Regiment
  - Special Warfare Training Centre

1981–1983

- Malaysian Special Service Group
  - Garrison Command
  - 21st Para Commando Regiment
    - 11th Special Service Regiment, Malaysian Intelligence Corps
  - 22nd Para Commando Regiment
    - 12th Special Service Regiment, Malaysian Intelligence Corps
  - 21st Signals Squadron, Malaysian Signals Regiment
  - 21st Engineering Squadron, Malaysian Army Engineers Regiment
  - 21st Composite Company, Malaysian Logistic Corps
  - 21st Ordnance Company, Malaysian Ordnance Corps
  - 21st Military Police Company, Malaysian Military Police Corps
  - 21st Workshop Company, Malaysian Corps of Electrical & Mechanical Engineers
  - Armed Forces Payroll Affairs Company, Malaysian General Service Corps
  - Special Warfare Training Centre

1983–1985

- Malaysian Special Service Group
  - Garrison Command
  - 11th Special Service Regiment
  - 21st Para Commando Regiment
  - 22nd Para Commando Regiment
  - 21st Signals Squadron, Malaysian Signals Regiment
  - 21st Composite Company, Malaysian Service Corps
  - 21st Ordnance Company, Malaysian Ordnance Corps
  - 21st Military Police Company, Malaysian Military Police Corps
  - 21st Workshop Company, Malaysian Corps of Electrical & Mechanical Engineers
  - Armed Forces Payroll Affairs Company, Malaysian General Service Corps
  - Special Warfare Training Centre

1985–2017

- 21st Special Service Group
  - Garrison Command
  - 11th Special Service Regiment
  - 21st Commando Regiment
  - 22nd Commando Regiment
  - 21st Signal Squadron, Royal Signals
  - 21st Composite Company, Royal Logistics
  - 21st Ordnance Company, Royal Ordnance
  - 21st Military Police Company, Royal Military Police
  - 21st Workshop Squadron, Royal Electrical & Mechanical Engineers
  - Armed Forces Payroll Affairs Company, General Service Corps

=== Current structures ===
21 SSG's Current Organisational Structure

21st Special Service Group
Unit's name (English)	Unit's name (Bahasa Malaysia)	Abbreviation	Beret backing	Headquarters	Specialty and purpose
Garrison Headquarters	Markas Garison	MK GARISSON		Camp Sri Iskandar	The MK GARISSON is a company-sized unit that provides administrative support to assist the 21 SSG in its administration.
11th Special Service Regiment	11 Rejimen Gerak Khas	11 SSR		Camp Sungai Udang	The 11th Special Service Regiment stands as a top-tier special forces unit within the Malaysian Army and is one of the three combat units under the 21 SSG. Referred to as the 11 Unit Lawan Keganasan (Abbr.: 11 ULK), or the 11th Counter Terrorism Unit in English, its duties encompass counter-terrorism, hostage rescue, close protection, and special reconnaissance.
21st Commando Regiment	Rejimen 21 Komando	21 CDO		Camp Sungai Udang	The 21st Commando Regiment (21 CDO) is one of the three combat units within the 21 SSG. Specialising in traditional special forces roles, the 21 CDO distinguishes itself by emphasising airborne operations, in contrast to the 22nd Commando Regiment. Its capabilities encompass unconventional warfare, direct action, counter-insurgency and special reconnaissance.
22nd Commando Regiment	Rejimen 22 Komando	22 CDO		Camp Sri Iskandar	The 22nd Commando Regiment is among the three combat units within the 21 SSG. After undergoing a restructuring in 2009, the 22 CDO now places a greater emphasis on amphibious operations compared to its previous specialisation in mountain warfare. Like the 21 CDO, its responsibilities encompass unconventional warfare, direct action, counter-insurgency, and special reconnaissance. Additionally, it has taken on a new role of anti-piracy.
21st Logistic Group	21 Kumpulan Logistik	21 KUMP LOG		Camp Sri Iskandar	The 21 KUMP LOG is a specialised unit that supports combat operations for the 21 SSG by providing services like military logistics. Formed in 2017, it is one of the newest units alongside the 21 MEDIC. Merging service support companies from the 21 SSG created the 21 KUMP LOG, resulting in three squadrons: 21st Materials Squadron, Royal Ordnance; Logistics Service Squadron, Royal Logistics; 21st Workshop Squadron REME
21st (Special Forces) Signal Squadron, Royal Signals	21 Skuadron Semboyan Gerak Khas	21 SSD		Camp Sri Iskandar	The 21 SSD is a special operations combat support unit tasked with providing communication support to all units under the command of the 21 SSG.
21st (Special Forces) Medic Squadron, Royal Medicals	21 Skuadron Medik Gerak Khas	21 MEDIC		Camp Sri Iskandar	The 21 MEDIC is a special operations support unit assigned to provide medical support to all units under the command of the 21 SSG. Alongside the 21st Logistics Group, established in 2017, these are the newest units of the 21 SSG. Its duties include supplying special operations combat medics and delivering medical care to all special forces members and their families at army camps occupied by the 21 SSG.
21st (Special Forces) Company, Royal Military Police	21 Kompeni Polis Tentera Diraja	21 KPTD		Camp Sri Iskandar	The 21 KPTD is a military police unit responsible for law enforcement within the 21 SSG and Camp Sri Iskandar.
21 SSG Intelligence Cell, Royal Intelligence	Sel Risik 21 GGK			Camp Sri Iskandar	This unit manages military intelligence operations, overseeing the careful dissemination of information within the 21 SSG to avoid leaks.

=== Family welfare support ===
The 21 SSG's BAKAT manages family welfare support for the 21st Special Service Group. The spouse of the Commander of 21 SSG leads the organisation, with the commander serving as its patron.

== Uniforms and insignia ==
=== Green beret ===
Members of Gerak Khas inherit the green beret and Fairbairn–Sykes fighting knife as a symbol of commando qualification, a tradition adopted from the Royal Marines Commando. This practice originated when the initial group underwent commando training at the British Army Jungle Warfare Training School with the 40 Commando Royal Marines in 1965. (Note: The British Army Jungle Warfare Training School was located in Johor at the time.)

In terms of exclusivity, the Gerak Khas green beret is less restricted compared to the maroon beret of the 10th Parachute Brigade (10 PARA BDE). Any Malaysian Army personnel attached to 21 SSG are permitted to wear the green beret, even if they have not completed the Malaysian Army Special Forces Selection. However, members who successfully complete the Special Forces Selection have the distinction of wearing their unit's beret backing (the Malaysian equivalent of the U.S. military beret flash) to signify their commando qualification. This differs from the British Armed Forces and the U.S. Army, where only those who complete the Royal Marines selection or the United States Army Special Forces selection are authorised to wear the green beret. (Note: Non-commando qualified Royal Marines wear a dark blue beret, whereas non-commando qualified British Army soldiers wear their original unit headdress.) (Note: Soldiers assigned to the U.S. Army Special Forces who are not Special Forces-qualified wear a maroon beret. This is because the 1st Special Forces Command (Airborne) is also designated as an airborne unit.) Likewise, the maroon beret of 10 PARA BDE is exclusively worn by those who graduate from the Rapid Deployment Force pipeline.

In 2023, during the tenure of Major General Adi Ridzwan Abdullah as Commanding Officer of 21 SSG, an effort was made to increase the exclusivity of the green beret. During his command, only those who passed the Special Forces Selection were permitted to wear it, while others within 21 SSG who had not yet completed selection continued wearing their original unit berets. However, after his tenure ended, the policy was reverted to its previous state.

=== Shoulder sleeve insignia ===
Shoulder sleeve insignia of the 21st Special Service Group. Worn from the 1980s to the present. The motto reads "Fast and Fit"

==== Number 5 uniform (Combat uniform) ====
The insignia, alternatively referred to as a tactical formation patch (Malay: Lencana formasi taktikal), is affixed to the combat uniform and bears olive and black colours. The patch prominently showcases a roaring tiger's head with a commando dagger positioned at the centre.

==== Number 2 uniform (Bush jacket) ====
The personnel of the 21 SSG don their command insignia on the left shoulder sleeve of their number 2 uniform. The 21 SSG shoulder sleeve insignia closely resembles the beret backing but incorporates a distinct black outline. This current design draws inspiration from the insignia of the Malaysian Special Service Unit, featuring a striking depiction of a roaring tiger's head with a commando dagger at the centre. The background is a fusion of jungle green and Caribbean blue, where jungle green signifies commando specialities and serves as a representation of the colour of Islam, while Caribbean blue pays homage to the founder, 40 Commando Royal Marines.

=== Stable belt ===
Members of the 21 SSG don the number 3 uniform (work dress) paired with a green and light blue stable belt.

== Future plans ==
=== New camouflage uniform ===
The 21st Special Service Group (21 SSG) and its subordinate units are expected to adopt a distinct camouflage uniform pattern to differentiate themselves from other formations within the Malaysian Army. The selected design is the MultiCam pattern, developed by Crye Precision and widely used by the United States Army.

This initiative aligns with the long-standing practice within the Malaysian Armed Forces, whereby each special forces unit is issued a unique camouflage pattern exclusive to that formation. For instance, the Royal Malaysian Navy's Naval Special Forces utilises the US Navy SEALs woodland pattern, symbolising their lineage from the SEALs, while the RMAF Special Forces dons Malaysian Army tiger stripe pattern (corak Belang Harimau), reflecting their historical ties with Gerak Khas and their role as an air force ground unit. Similarly, the Royal Malaysia Police's 69 Commando and Special Actions Unit, along with the Malaysian Coast Guard's STAR team, each employ distinct camouflage patterns tailored to their operational environments and identities.

Plans for a new camouflage uniform for the 21 SSG were first mooted in 2019, when the Malaysian Armed Forces proposed the adoption of a standardised camouflage pattern across all tri-service special forces. The proposed design, while inspired by the original MultiCam pattern, incorporated distinctive horizontal elements. A demonstration version of the uniform was first showcased by First Admiral Dato' Anuar Alias PGB, then Commanding Officer of the Naval Special Forces, during the 2019 Navy Fleet Open Day. However, there have been no further official updates regarding the status of that standardisation initiative.

The decision to proceed with the original Crye Precision MultiCam pattern for 21 SSG is believed to be influenced by the unit's close working relationship with the United States Army's 1st Special Forces Group, which is based in Okinawa, Japan. The tender for the new camouflage uniform closed on 6 June 2025, and the 21 SSG is expected to begin wearing the new pattern in the near future.

== Commanders ==
Since the establishment of the Malaysian Special Service Unit in 1965, 22 individuals have served as the Commander of Gerak Khas, also known as the Panglima Gerak Khas (lit. 'Commander of Special Forces') in Malay. Out of these 22 individuals, 17 have held the position of the Commander of the 21st Special Service Group (Malay: Panglima 21 Gerup Gerak Khas), which was created after 1981.

=== Commander of the 21st Special Service Group ===
The position begins after the Malaysian Special Service Command was renamed to the Malaysian Special Service Group on 1 April 1981.

No.	Portrait	Commander of the 21 SSG	Took office	Left office	Time in office	Ref.
1	Dato' Harun Taib	Brigadier General; Dato' Harun Taib	1 January 1980	31 December 1983	3 years, 364 days	He retired as a Brigadier General; he previously held the position of the Commander of the 21 SSG
2	Dato' Borhan Ahmad	Brigadier General; Dato' Borhan Ahmad	1 January 1984	18 December 1985	1 year, 351 days	He retired as a General; he previously held the position of the 12th Chief of Defence Forces
3	Datuk Hasbullah Yusof	Brigadier General; Datuk Hasbullah Yusof	19 December 1985	30 June 1989	3 years, 193 days	While in service, he met a tragic end in a helicopter crash on 8 December 1989. At the time, he held the rank of Brigadier General and served as the Commander of the 3rd Infantry Brigade
4	Dato’ Mohd Ramli Ismail	Brigadier General; Dato’ Mohd Ramli Ismail	1 July 1989	2 March 1993	3 years, 244 days	He retired as a Major General; he previously held the position of the Commander of the Malaysian Army Training and Doctrine Command. Died on 6 December 2011
5	Dato’ Ghazali Ibrahim	Brigadier General; Dato’ Ghazali Ibrahim	3 March 1993	2 November 1995	2 years, 243 days	He retired as a Major General; he previously held the position of the Commander of the Malaysian Army Training and Doctrine Command
6	Dato' Daud Ariffin	Brigadier General; Dato' Daud Ariffin	3 November 1995	-	-	He retired as a Brigadier General; he previously held the position of the Commander of the 21 SSG
7	Dato' Ahmad Rodi Zakaria	Brigadier General; Dato' Ahmad Rodi Zakaria	-	-	-	He retired as a Major General; he previously held the position of the Commander of the Malaysian Army Training and Doctrine Command
8	Dato' Awie Suboh	Brigadier General; Dato' Awie Suboh	1 September 2006	28 July 2009	2 years, 330 days	He retired as a Lieutenant General; he previously held the position of the Commander of the 1st Infantry Division
9	Dato' Abdul Samad Yaacob	Brigadier General; Dato' Abdul Samad Yaacob	29 July 2009	2012	-	He retired as a Major General; he previously held the position of the Assistant Chief-of-Staff of Malaysian Army Planning and Development
10	Dato' Harun Hitam	Brigadier General; Dato' Harun Hitam	2012	-	-	He retired as a Brigadier General; he previously held the position of the Commander of the 21 SSG
11	Dato' Affendy Abd Karim	Brigadier General; Dato' Affendy Abd Karim	-	14 December 2016	-	He retired as a Brigadier General; he previously held the position of the Commander of the 21 SSG
12	Datuk Zolkopli Hashim	Major General; Datuk Zolkopli Hashim	15 December 2016	22 November 2017	342 days	He retired as a Major General; he previously held the position of the Commander of the 21 SSG
13	Datuk Hasan Ali	Lieutenant General; Datuk Hasan Ali	23 November 2017	19 July 2020	2 years, 239 days	He retired as a Lieutenant General; he previously held the position of the Commander of the 21 SSG
14	Datuk Jamaluddin Jambi	Major General; Datuk Jamaluddin Jambi	20 July 2020	5 September 2021	1 year, 47 days	He retired as a Major General; he previously held the position of the Commander of the 21 SSG
15	Nubli Hashim	Major General; Nubli Hashim	6 September 2021	14 May 2023	1 year, 250 days	He retired as a Major General; he previously held the position of the Commander of the 21 SSG
16	Mohd Adi Ridzwan Abdullah	Major General; Mohd Adi Ridzwan Abdullah	15 May 2023	10 May 2024	361 days	He retired as a Major General; he previously held the position of the Commander of the 21 SSG
17	Dato' Ahmad Shuhaimi Mat Wajab	Major General; Dato' Ahmad Shuhaimi Mat Wajab	11 May 2024	Incumbent	2 years, 192 days	

== Lineage ==
1960	1965	1970	1980 Separated	1981 Name changes	1985 Name changes
Malayan Special Forces	Malaysian Special Service Unit	1st Malaysian Special Service Regiment	Malaysian Special Service Command	Malaysian Special Service Group	21st Special Service Group
Malayan Special Forces	Malaysian Special Service Unit	1st Malaysian Special Service Regiment	1st Malaysian Special Service Regiment	21st Para Commando Regiment	21st Commando Regiment

== See also ==
- Elite Forces of Malaysia
  - Royal Malaysian Navy Naval Special Forces (PASKAL)
  - Royal Malaysian Air Force RMAF Special Forces (PASKAU)
  - Malaysia Coast Guard Special Task and Rescue – Coast guard special operations command
  - Royal Malaysia Police Pasukan Gerakan Khas – Police special operations command
  - Malaysian Army 10th Parachute Brigade – Army special operations capable force
