= Zaini Mohd Said =

Retired Malaysian Army general officer

Yang Berbahagia Lieutenant General (B) Dato' Seri Panglima Zaini Mohd Said SP SPMJ SPTS PSAT DPMJ DSAP DMSM DPNS PAT JSD KMN AK BSK BGP PIS PPA PPM
- Born: Ulu Lenggeng, Negeri Sembilan, Malaysia
- Military career
- Allegiance: Malaysia; Yang di-Pertuan Agong
- Branch: Malaysian Army
- Service years: 1963–2001
- Rank: Lieutenant General (Malay: Leftenan Jeneral)
- Units: Royal Malay Regiment (1964–1966); Grup Gerak Khas (1966–2001)
- Commands: Army field commander Panglima medan tentera darat
- Conflicts: Indonesian-Malaysian Confrontation Communist insurgency in Malaysia (1968–89); Al-Ma'unah
- Awards: Seri Pahlawan Gagah Perkasa (SP), Darjah Seri Panglima Taming Sari
- Other work: Corporate director

Zaini bin Mohd Said is a retired Malaysian Army general officer. His last rank was lieutenant general (Malay: leftenan jeneral) and his last position was as the Malaysian Army's field commander. Zaini is well known for his role in the surrender of Mohamed Amin Mohamed Razali, the leader of the Al-Mau'nah group that staged the arms heist at Battalion 304 Rejimen Askar Wataniah and the subsequent siege of the group at Bukit Jenalik, Sauk in Perak. Zaini was awarded the Seri Pahlawan Gagah Perkasa (SP), Malaysia's highest gallantry award, for his role during the Al Mau'nah siege.

== Early life ==
Zaini was born in Ulu Lenggeng, Negeri Sembilan. He had his early education in Kuala Lumpur during his father serve with Royal Malaysia Police as instructor drill.

== Army service ==
Zaini joined the Army as a cadet officer in 1963. He had held many appointments throughout his career in the Malaysian Army and spent about 25 of his 35 years of service with the Malaysian Army and its special forces.

He was vastly experienced in the command of elite and regular army formations. He was deputy commander of the 21 Gerup Gerak Khas, later commander of the 10 Parachute Brigade and later appointed the general officer commanding (GOC) of the 3rd Infantry Division based in Peninsular Malaysia.

He attended the US Marine Corps Command and Staff College course in 1978–79, and later the Malaysian Armed Forces Defence College course in Kuala Lumpur in 1985. He was a graduate of the National Defence College course in Pakistan. In 1997, he attended the Asian Institute of Management Top Management Course in Phuket, Thailand. In 2000, he participated in the seminar program for senior executive in national and international security in Harvard University, USA.

His last posting was as army field commander (Malay: panglima medan). He retired from the Army in August 2001 with the rank lieutenant general (Malay: leftenan jeneral).

== Al Mau'nah Siege ==
Mohamed Amin Mohamed Razali led a band of 29 Al-Mau'nah men in a mission to overthrow the Malaysian government. The group included a serving Mejar in the Malaysian Army. They dressed up as senior army officers making a surprise inspection of the Battalion 304 Rejimen Askar Wataniah camp at the Temenggor Dam in Gerik, Perak. The group raided the armouries and took away 97 M16 assault rifles, four GPMGs, five grenade launchers, 9,095 rounds of 5.56 mm, 60 rounds of 40 mm ammunition and communication equipment. They then retreated to their prepared positions at Bukit Jenalik, Sauk in Perak.

As the Army corps commander, Zaini was the most senior Army personnel on the scene. Amin wanted to meet Zaini Together with Assistant Superintendent Police Abdul Razak Mohd Yusof, he tried to negotiate with the Al-Ma'unah members to lay down their arms and surrender. Amin was about to shoot Zaini when the latter warded off the gun which was then fired by Amin. The burst of gunfire hit one of Amin's followers, Halim, killing him instantly." (NST 7 July 2000 front-page story)

== Sauk incident ==
Bernama reported that Zaini was disappointed about allegations that the Sauk Incident was stage managed to discredit parti Islam Se Malaysia, the Islam-based opposition party. The allegation was made despite the shooting to death of commando Mathew anak Medan and police detective Sarjan R. Sagadevan and the gunshot wounds incurred by Sarjan Ukoon anak Pungkok. Zaini claimed the allegations were made by groups with a political agenda. He claimed the allegations had belittled the sacrifices of the security forces and was most disgusting and humiliating to the security forces whose achievements and devotion to duty had received world recognition.

== Post military life ==
Zaini was appointed a director of Opcom Holdings Berhad on 12 September 2003 and made chairman of the Audit Committee. He is also a director of a public listed company, AV Ventures Corporation Berhad (formerly known as Autoindustries Ventures Berhad). He is the chairman of RMS Technology Sdn. Bhd.

Zaini was quoted by the Agence France Presse, 3 February 2002 as saying that a military conflict may break out if the issue of water supply between Singapore and Malaysia is not resolved properly. "In this context, it is crucial the issue of water is addressed with caution by the leaders and the governments of the two countries. A military conflict must be avoided because it will only hurt both countries," he was quoted as saying in the Mingguan Malaysia.

== Honours ==
- Malaysia
  - Recipient of the Grand Knight of Valour (SP) (2001)
  - Companion of the Order of Loyalty to the Royal Family of Malaysia (JSD) (1986)
  - Officer of the Order of the Defender of the Realm (KMN) (1985)
  - Recipient of the General Service Medal (PPA)
  - Recipient of the Malaysian Commemorative Medal (Bronze) (PPM) (1965)
  - Recipient of the 8th Yang di-Pertuan Agong Installation Medal
- Malaysian Armed Forces
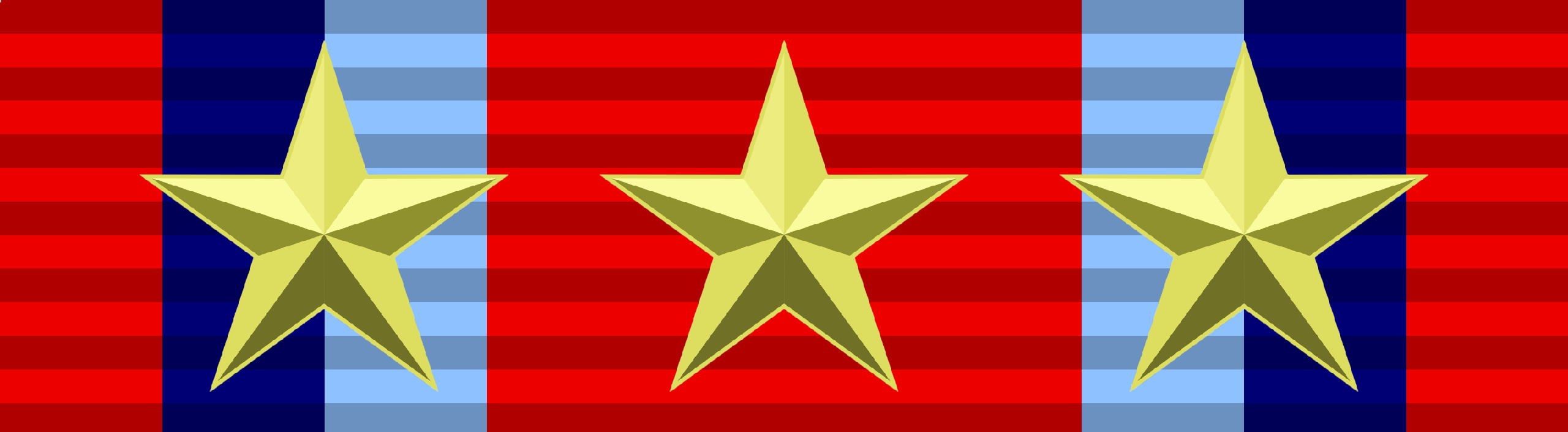
  - Loyal Commander of the Most Gallant Order of Military Service (PSAT)
  - Warrior of the Most Gallant Order of Military Service (PAT)
- Johor
  - Knight Grand Commander of the Order of the Crown of Johor (SPMJ) – Dato' (2000)
  - Knight Commander of the Order of the Crown of Johor (DPMJ) – Dato' (1998)
  - Second Class of the Sultan Ibrahim Medal (PIS II) (1983)
- Kelantan
  - Recipient of the Ahli Kelantan Decoration (AK)
- Malacca
  - Companion Class I of the Exalted Order of Malacca (DMSM) – Datuk (1996)
  - Recipient of the Supreme Gallantry Star (BGP) (2000)
- Negeri Sembilan
  - Knight Commander of the Order of Loyalty to Negeri Sembilan (DPNS) – Dato' (2012)
- Pahang
  - Knight Companion of the Order of Sultan Ahmad Shah of Pahang (DSAP) – Dato' (1998)
- Perak
  - Knight Grand Commander of the Order of Taming Sari (SPTS) – Dato' Seri Panglima (2000)
- Sabah
  - Grand Star of the Order of Kinabalu (BSK)
