= Small unit tactics =

Application of US military doctrine

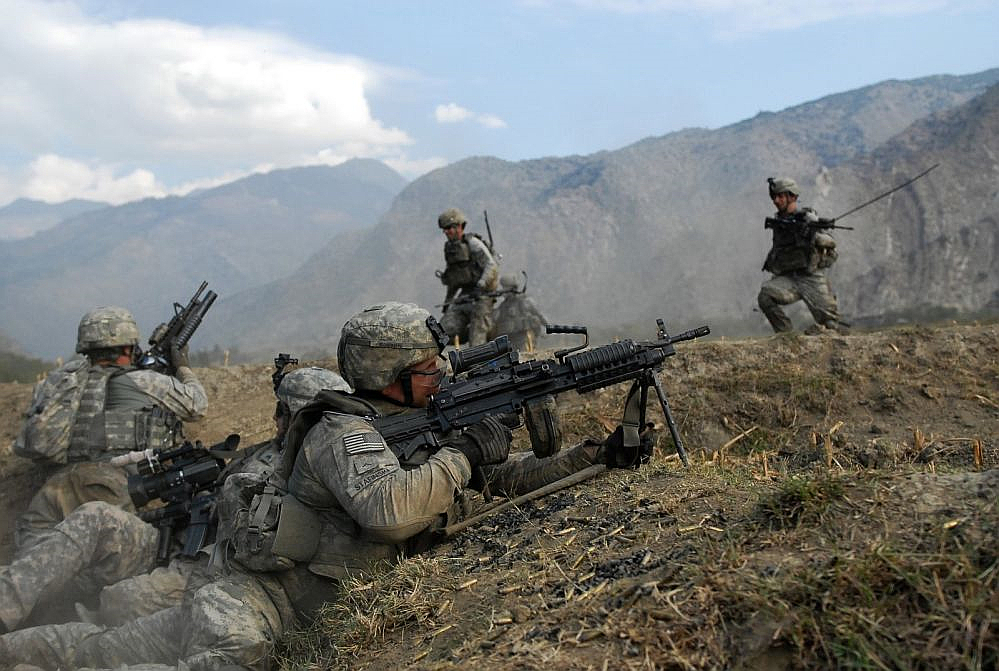
4th Infantry Division in Afghanistan

Small unit tactics is the application of US Army military doctrine for the combat deployment of platoons and smaller units in a particular strategic and logistic environment. The composition of a United States Army squad falls into three broad categories: classical, balanced and combined.

== Classical ==
United States Army 'classical' squads are composed of three elements; a command and support element, a base of fire element, and a maneuver element. The command and support element could include a squad leader, an assistant squad leader, a medic, a forward observer and a radio operator or it could be limited to a squad leader. The fire element consists of a machine gunner and one or two personnel who act as loaders and barrel changers for the gun and porters for its ammunition and ancillary components. The maneuver element is composed of troops armed with assault rifles, entrenching tools, grenades and additional ammunition for the machine gun and tasked with the role of enabling the safe movement of the fire element by scouting ahead and providing a security detail.

== Balanced ==
Balanced squads are composed of two or three fire teams coupled with a command and support element. The fire teams could either be standard base of fire elements organized around a machine gun and protected by assault rifle or submachine gun wielding ammunition porters or the fire teams could be organized as 'storm' units composed of a handful of personnel armed with assault rifles reinforced with a squad automatic weapon and grenade launchers.

== Combined ==
The combined squad is composed of dissimilar fire teams; an RPG team, a fire team and a sniper team. The RPG team consists of two personnel; one armed with an RPG launcher and the other porting extra RPGs and providing protection with an assault rifle. The fire team is composed of two personnel; one carrying a machine gun and the other porting its ammunition. The sniper team consists of one or two persons, one deploying the weapon, often a semi-automatic designated marksman rifle as opposed to a true sniper rifle, and the other acting as spotter and providing close protection.

== Combat Strategy and Phases ==
=== Assault ===
The two major techniques of squad assault are bounded fire and advancing under the cover of suppressive fire of supporting units. Bounded fire entails having one element of the squad provide covering fire and field obscuration while the second element maneuvers forward to provide covering fire that allows the first element to leapfrog forward. This process is repeated until the maneuver element is in grenade range of the enemy positions. Advancing under the cover of supporting units requires the squad to stealthily advance towards the enemy position from a weakly held sector after the enemy has been suppressed by overwhelming fire. Once the squad has closed with the enemy it uses grenades and squad automatic fire to engage the enemy. This allows sufficient disruption of the enemy's control of their defensive front to allow other squads to advance unopposed. United States Marines squads are arranged into "Buddy Pairs" and will assault in "Buddy Rushes", ensuring that one Marine is firing at the enemy while the other is maneuvering.

=== Interim ===
In this phase the squad consolidates its position by entrenchment, construction of fortifications, creation of passageways between structures and forward reconnaissance of surrounding areas. Minor chemical decontamination will commence as seals, respirators and masks are checked for damage. Body armor will be examined to replace damaged ceramic plates. Casualties will be treated, evacuated and/or replaced. The squad will use this period to familiarise itself with its surroundings, dig in to defensible positions, recharge itself, repair any damage to itself and prepare either for the next offensive movement, or go on the defensive against a counterattack.

=== Defensive ===
On the defensive, an isolated squad will allow a small element to hold a weak and easily evacuated position behind a remote detonated mine, flanked by a machine gun. As the enemy advances, the small forward element will pull back. When its former position is overrun the mine will be detonated to distract the attackers, and then the machine gun will open fire on the attacker's flank. The machine gun will then switch to engage and suppress the tail of the enemy assault as the rest of the squad maneuvers against its dislocated and exposed flanks, which have been pulled forward from their defensive line to support the head of the assault. On the defensive, a squad with a secure means of communication will fix the enemy into interlocked fields of fire and call in fire support from supporting units.
