= Royal Marines selection and training =

Royal Marines recruit training is the longest basic modern infantry training programme of any Commonwealth, or North Atlantic Treaty Organization (NATO) combat troops. The Royal Marines are the only part of the British Armed Forces where officers and other ranks are trained at the same location, the Commando Training Centre Royal Marines (CTCRM) at Lympstone, Devon. Much of the basic training is carried out on the rugged terrain of Dartmoor and Woodbury Common with a significant proportion taking place at night.

== Selection ==
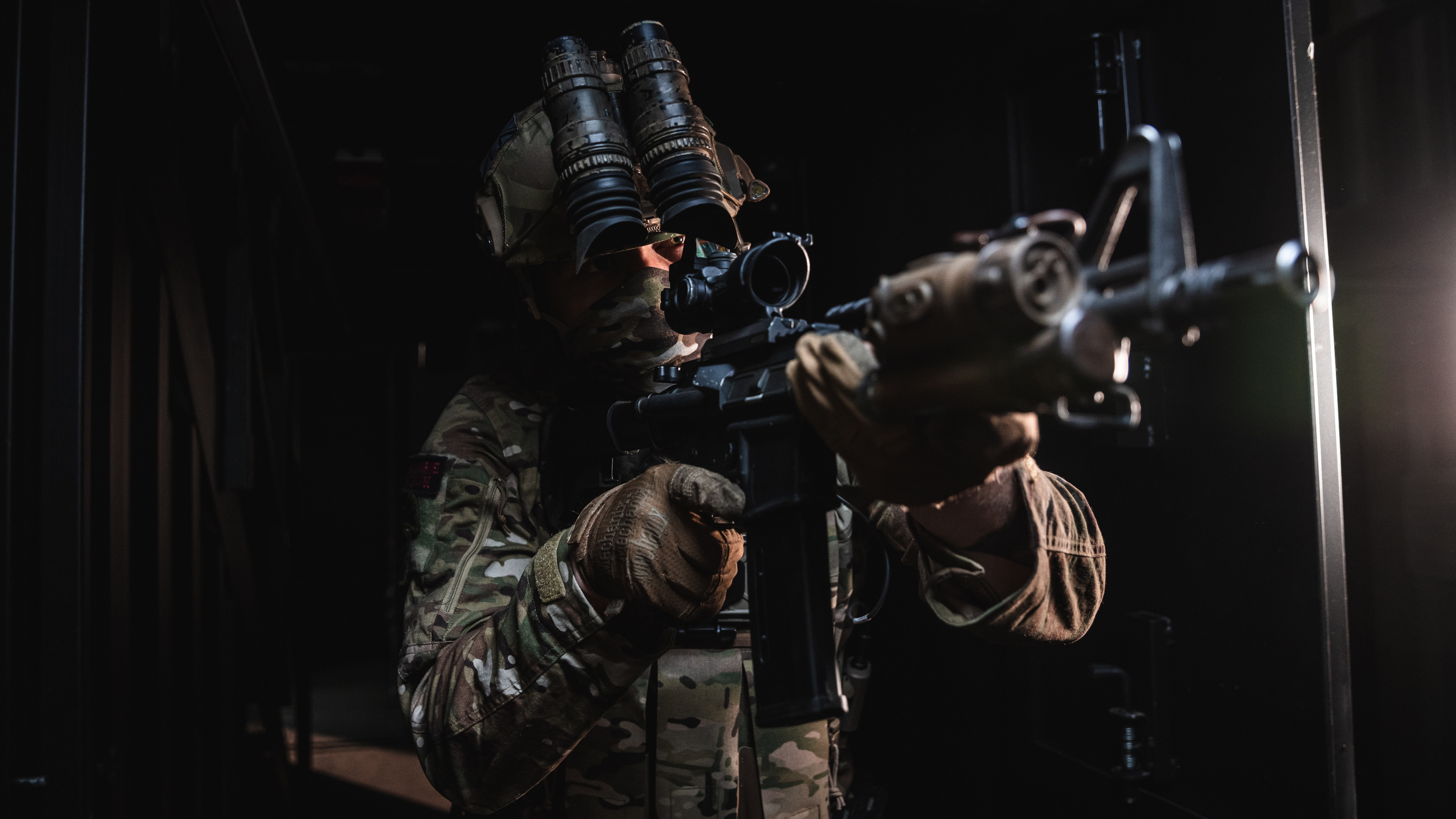
Royal Marines Commando in Future Commando Force uniform

All potential recruits take a Defence Aptitude Assessment and are interviewed at the Armed Forces Careers Office (AFCO) to assess their suitability. A series of physical assessments are conducted including a sight test and medical examination. Then the Pre-Joining Fitness Test Plus (PJFT+). The PJFT+ is a circuit assessment. Potential recruits have to complete the circuit three times, with each requiring the completion of 20 burpees, 30 sit ups, 20 press ups and a one-minute plank. On completion of the three circuits, recruits are required to perform a set of five pull ups.

Royal Marines recruits must be aged 16 to 32 (they must be in Recruit Training before their 33rd birthday). Due to the July 2016 lifting on the ban on women in Ground Close Combat roles, females are now permitted to join all British military infantry units, including the Royal Marines Commandos.

The final selection assessment for potential recruits is either the Candidate Preparation Course (CPC) for ratings candidates, or the Officer Selection Course (OSC) and Admiralty Interview Board for officer candidates. CPC and OSC last three days and assess physical ability and intellectual capacity to undertake the recruit training. Potential Officers must be aged 18 to 25.

== Training ==
=== Royal Marines Commando Training ===
Royal Marines Commando Training is one of the world's longest and most arduous training programmes. The programme is intended to train recruits in all skills required to become an amphibious soldier with the Marines.

Once through the recruiting process, candidates are given a date to start Initial Training at Commando Training Centre Royal Marines (CTCRM), Lympstone. Initial training is a five-stage process, with only successful candidates progressing to the next stage.

The first of these stages is a 4-week Recruit Orientation Phase (ROP). This stage provides an introduction to life as a marine and includes Physical Training (PT) and swimming sessions and testing, drill and personal administration, weapon handling, close combat training and basic fieldcraft. ROP culminates in a three-day field exercise and fitness assessment. Recruits have two attempts to pass this assessment. If successful, they move on to spend a further 32 weeks in training.

Young officer (YO) training begins with Phase 1 which teaches the officers how to be Royal Marines.

=== Training Phases ===
Recruit Orientation Phase (ROP) – 4 weeks

Phase 1 – 10 weeks

Individual skills

If recruits successfully pass the ROP, they continue training by learning and developing individual skills. This phase will see them continue with: PT gym sessions, swimming sessions, drill, weapon handling and fieldcraft. They also develop map reading and navigation skills, live firing experience and marksmanship training.

This culminates in a fitness assessment and the field exercise 'Baptist Run'.

Phase 2 – 13 weeks

Team and Section Skills (weeks 11 to 15)

At this stage training progresses to learning skills that include: Reconnaissance and Surveillance (RS), small team tactics, tactical navigation and signalling, medic training and section tactics. PT and swimming sessions continue.

Troop and Urban Skills (weeks 16 to 23)

In this final stage of the initial training recruits progress to more targeted combat training, comprising: General Purpose Machine Gun (GPMG), pistol handling and live firing, troop tactics, tactical night navigation, Royal Marines close combat training, close quarter battle training and Strike Operations (Strike Ops) training.

This phase will also see skills consolidated, Bottom Field Pass Out and a test exercise take place.

Commando Phase – 8 weeks

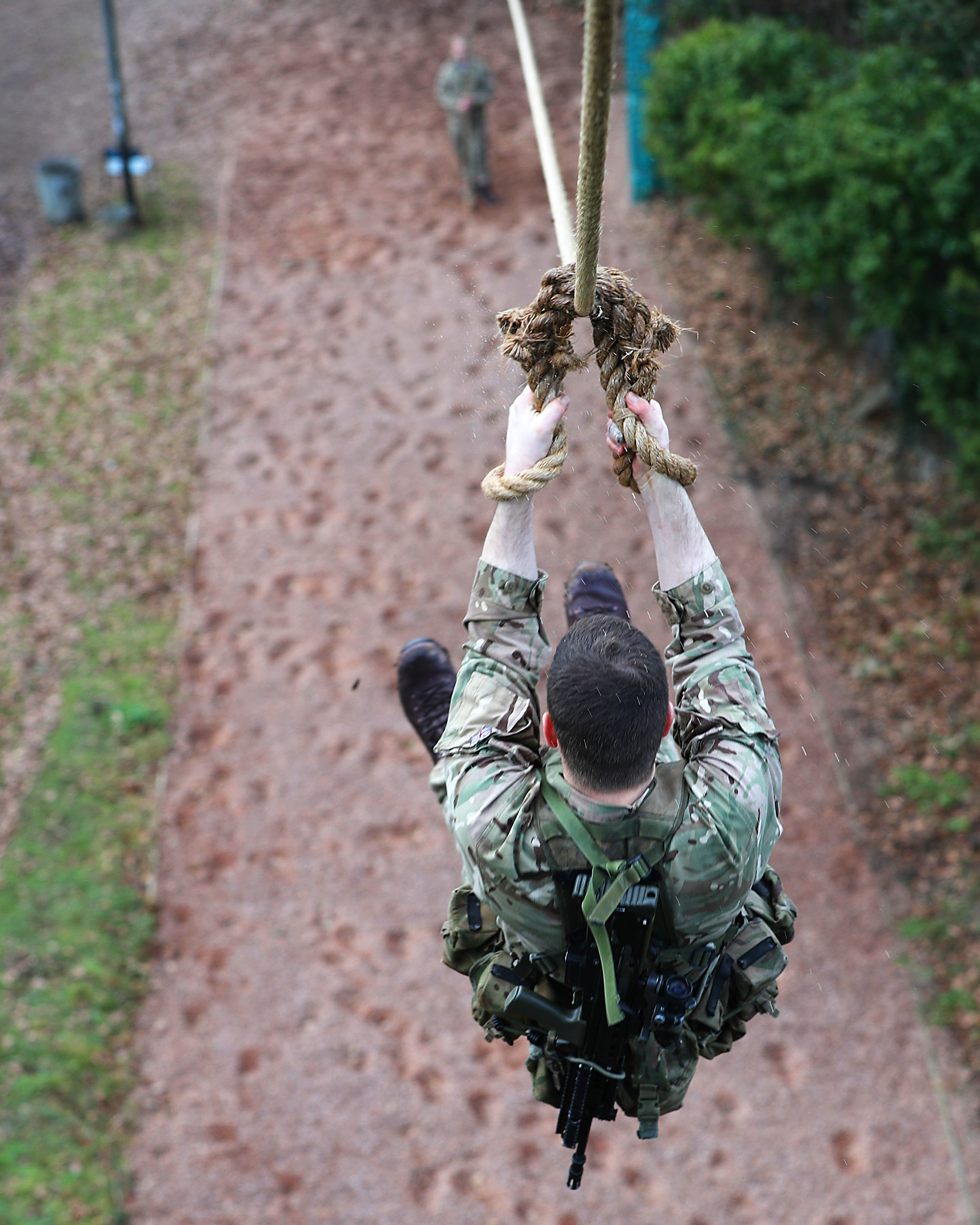
A recruit, at the start of the 'Tarzan Assault Course slides down the death slide (known as the Commando Slide).

If successful in the first stages of training, recruits progress to introductory Commando training. This will see them undertake: Live firing tactical training - at section and troop level, day and night manoeuvre training and amphibious foundation training. A final exercise and four Commando tests will follow:

1. The endurance course: Two miles of tunnels, pools, streams, bogs and woods, followed by a four-mile run back to camp where recruits will need to achieve six out of ten in a shooting test.
2. The nine-mile speed march: This needs to be completed in 90 minutes, as a unified squad, while carrying 30lbs of equipment and rifle.
3. The Tarzan assault course: This is an aerial assault course which needs to be completed in 13 minutes, while carrying 30lbs of equipment and rifle.
4. The 30-mile march: This is a march across Dartmoor, through mixed terrain, which needs to be completed in less than eight hours, carrying 40lbs of equipment and a rifle.

Kings Squad – 1 week

The 'Kings Squad' is the culmination of 32 weeks Royal Marines Commando Training and a tradition that has been in place since His Majesty King George V granted the honour in 1918. At pass out the successful recruits become Royal marine Commandos and are awarded the coveted Green Beret

=== YO (Young Officer) Training Modules ===
Phase 1: Initial Training

This 16-week training course will introduce the YO's to the core skills they need to be a Royal Marine, and assess their abilities in an intensive and progressive environment.

Phase 2: Tactics and Doctrine Training

For the next 12 weeks the training will switch focus to Section and Troop level tactical development. Using what the YO's have already learnt, they will spend time preparing, delivering and receiving orders. This phase will incorporate a mixture of academic study and advanced physical training.

Phase 3 – Defensive, Fibua, Special to Arms, and Commando Course Phase

This six-week phase will hone the YO's defensive skills, teaching the principles of transitional operations, and introduce the YO's to the tactics of Fighting In Built Up Areas (FIBUA).

Phase 4 – Advanced Military Management Training

This phase is designed to broaden the YO's experience and military knowledge. They will complete a two-week range qualification course, before further academic study at BRNC Dartmouth. Additional exercises will take place during a deployment to the United States.

Phase 5 – Unit Management, Exercise Planning and Final Exercise.

This phase will provide the YO's with the essential ability to administrate and manage their men. Topics that they will cover, include:

Military law

Report writing

Unit documentation

Strategic studies

A planning exercise in Normandy

=== Training exercises ===
Throughout basic training, recruits must undertake field exercises which provide training and test application of learning.

Phase 1

- Dark Night
- Quick cover
- Marshall star
- Hunter's moon
- Baptist run

Phase 2

- Shadow man
- Running man
- Early warning
- Light strike
- Second empire
- Urban warrior
- Chameleon
- Violent entry

Commando Phase

- Direct action
- Final exercise

=== YO Training exercises ===
Throughout YO training, Young Officers must undergo many exercises testing what they have learnt up to that point.

Phase 1

- First Stop – This is designed to introduce them to life in the field, teaching them how to look after themselves and navigate by day and night
- Tenderfoot – Here they will put the skills they have developed into practice, progressing to basic fieldcraft
- Lost Tribe – This is a day and night navigation exercise on Dartmoor. They'll need to be able to cope with unfamiliar terrain and remain calm under pressure
- Eye Opener – Another navigation exercise, this will also test their day and night navigation skills. It takes place over a longer period of time, so they will need stamina to be successful
- Quickdraw I – This is a firing range exercise, which is designed to bring their marksmanship skills up to standard. At the end of the exercise, they will take the Annual Combat Marksmanship Test (ACMT)
- Softly Softly – Here they will be introduced to low-level soldiering skills and basic operating procedures, at the same time as developing an understanding of the Estimate and Orders process

Phase 2

- Quickdraw II – They will make the transition from the firing range to live field firing, starting with Close Quarter Battle (CQB), before progressing to team firing and manoeuvres
- Long Night – Over the course of a week they will develop your tactical knowledge, and the ability to take the lead in different scenarios
- Eagle Eye – they will be taught to establish and run surface and sub-surface observation points
- Jagged Edge – This will teach them all about Troop level battle procedures and offensive operations
- Dragon Storm – Drawing on everything they've learned about offensive operations, they will complete a test exercise
- Quickdraw III – Tactical live firing training

Phase 3

- Open Door – This exercise will focus on conducting FIBUA operations up to Troop level
- Special To Arms Week – Here they will have an introduction to the specialist weapons and equipment that they'll use throughout their career
- Endurance Course – they will need to complete this in less than 71 minutes
- A 9-mile Speed March – they will need to complete this uphill route in less than 90 minutes
- Tarzan Assault Course – This ropes and ladders course will need to be completed in less than 12 minutes
- The 30 Miler – they will have 7 hours to complete this cross-terrain challenge, unlike recruits they must navigate it themselves

Phase 4

- Stone Post – they will conduct a number of visits that focus on the Army's land capabilities. This will broaden their Service knowledge
- Special To Arms Week – Here they will have an introduction to the specialist weapons and equipment that they'll use throughout their career
- Deep Blue – Similar to Stone Post, this exercise will provide them with an insight into the capabilities of the Royal Navy
- Virginia Tempest – This is a three-week deployment to the US, where they will forge closer links with the United States Marine Corps, and complete a number field exercises

Phase 5 Final Exercise consists of:

- Wet Raider – Taking place on the West Coast of Scotland, this is where their amphibious training will conclude
- Counter Insurgency – This is one of the most realistic experiences in training, replicating a full-scale riot
- Final Nail – they will be integrated with trained marines and use VIKING vehicles
- Otter's Run – Use of a series of hypothetical scenarios to hone their decision-making skills

=== The Commando course ===
The culmination of training is the Commando course. Following the Royal Marines taking on responsibility for the Commando role with the disbandment of the Army Commandos at the end of World War II, all Royal Marines, except those in the Royal Marines Band Service, complete the Commando course as part of their training (see below). Key aspects of the course include climbing and ropework techniques, patrolling and amphibious warfare operations.

This intense phase ends with a series of tests which have remained virtually unchanged since World War II. Again, these tests are done in full fighting order of 32 lb (14.5 kg) of equipment.

The Commando tests are taken on consecutive days and all four tests must be successfully completed within a seven-day period; they include;

- A nine mile (14.5 km) speed march, carrying full fighting order, to be completed in 90 minutes; the pace is thus 10 minutes per mile (9.6 km/h or 6 mph).
- The Endurance course is a six-mile (9.65 km) course which begins with a two-mile (3.22 km) run across rough moorland and woodland terrain at Woodbury Common near Lympstone, which includes tunnels, pipes, wading pools, and an underwater culvert. The course ends with a four-mile (6 km) run back to CTCRM. Followed by a marksmanship test, where the recruit must hit 6 out of 10 shots at a 25m target simulating 200 m. To be completed in 73 minutes (71 minutes for Royal Marine officers). Originally 72 minutes, these times were recently increased by one minute as the route of the course was altered.
- The Tarzan Assault Course. This is an assault course combined with an aerial confidence test. It starts with a death slide (now known as the Commando Slide) and ends with a rope climb up a thirty-foot near-vertical wall. It must be completed with full fighting order in 13 minutes, 12 minutes for officers. The Potential Officers Course also includes confidence tests from the Tarzan Assault Course, although not with equipment.
- The 30 miler. This is a 30-mile (48-km) march across upland Dartmoor, wearing full fighting order, and additional safety equipment carried by the recruit in a daysack. It must be completed in eight hours for recruits and seven hours for Royal Marine officers, who must also navigate the route themselves, rather than following a DS (a trained Royal Marine) with the rest of a syndicate and carry their own equipment.

After the 30-mile (48 km) march, any who failed any of the tests may attempt to retake them up until the seven-day window expires. If a recruit fails two or more of the tests, however, it is unlikely that a chance to re-attempt them will be offered.

Normally the seven- to eight-day schedule for the Commando Tests is as follows:

- Saturday – Endurance Course
- Sunday – Rest
- Monday – Nine Mile Speed March
- Tuesday – Tarzan Assault Course
- Wednesday – 30 Miler
- Thursday – Failed test re-runs
- Friday – Failed test re-runs
- Saturday – 30 Miler re-run if required

Completing the Commando course successfully entitles the recruit or officer to wear the green beret but does not mean that the Royal Marine has finished his training. That decision will be made by the troop or batch training team and will depend on the recruit's or young officer's overall performance. Furthermore, officer training consists of many more months. Training to be a Royal Marine takes 32 weeks. The last week is spent mainly on administration and preparing for the pass out parade. Recruits in their final week of training are known as the King's Squad and have their own section of the recruits' galley at Lympstone. After basic and commando training, a Royal Marine Commando will normally join a unit of 3 Commando Brigade. There are four Royal Marines Commando infantry units in the Brigade: 40 Commando located at Norton Manor Camp near Taunton in Somerset; 42 Commando at Bickleigh Barracks, near Plymouth, Devon; 43 Commando FPGRM at HMNB Clyde near Glasgow; and 45 Commando at RM Condor, Arbroath on the coast of Angus.

Non-Royal Marine volunteers for Commando training undertake the All Arms Commando Course. There is also a Reserve Commando Course run for members of the Royal Marines Reserve and Commando units of the Army Reserve.

=== YO Exams/Qualifications ===
- Map reading exam
- Signals exam
- Military Law exam
- Operations other than war exam
- Nuclear, Biological and Chemical Defence exam
- Strategic studies exam
- Part 1, Part 2 and end of course final exams
- The Commando tests
- Infantry range supervisor's qualification
- Helicopter Underwater Escape Training
- One-day Sea Survival Course
- Information Technology Level 2
- Defence Instructional Technique

=== Specialist training ===
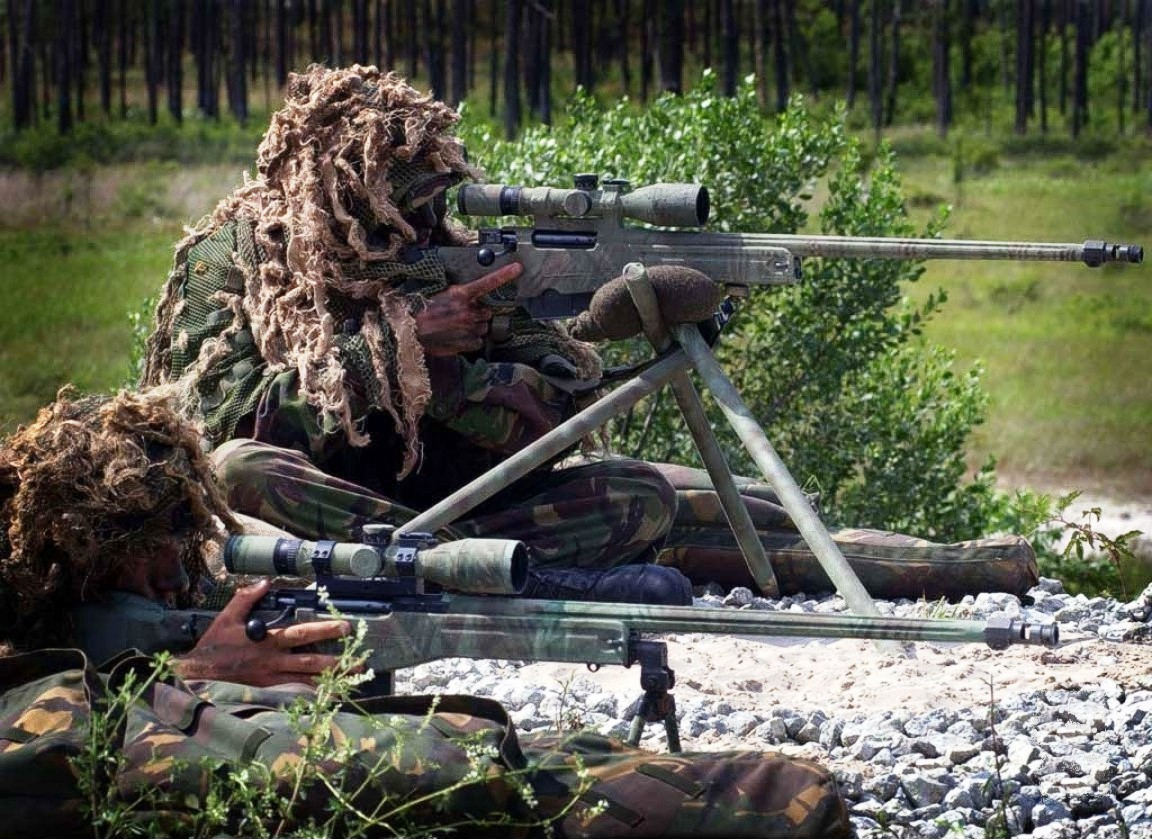
Royal Marine snipers with L115A1 sniper rifles

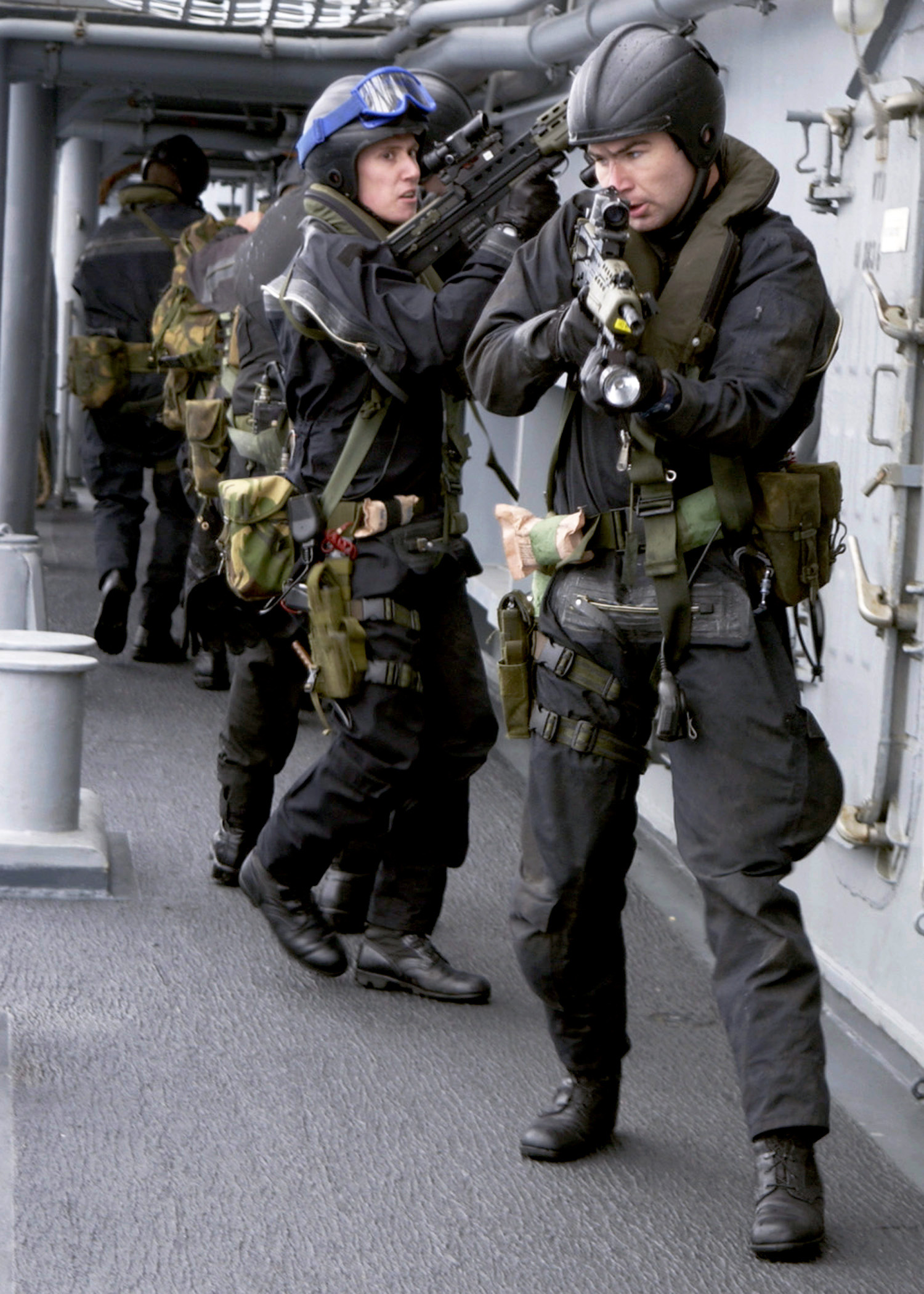
A Royal Marines team boards US Navy destroyer USS O'Bannon during training

Upon completion of training, Royal Marine recruits spend a period of time as a General Duties Rifleman. They are assigned to one of the three Commando battalions or a Fleet Standby Rifle Troop on board a Royal Navy ship for up to two years before being sent for specialist training.

Commandos may then go on to undertake specialist training in a variety of skills:

Recruit Specialisations

- Aircrewman
- Assault Engineer
- Viking Squadron (Viking)
- Armourer
- Clerk
- Combat Intelligence
- Communications Technician
- Drill Instructor
- Driver
- Heavy Weapons – Air Defence
- Heavy Weapons – Anti-Tank
- Heavy Weapons – Mortars
- Information Systems
- Landing Craft Coxswain
- Medical Assistant
- Metalsmith
- Military Police
- Mountain Leader
- Platoon Weapons Instructor
- Physical Training Instructor (PTI)
- Reconnaissance Operator
- Signaller
- Special Forces Communicator
- Swimmer Canoeist
- Stores Accountant
- Telecommunications Technician (Tels Tech)
- Vehicle Mechanic (VM)
- Yeoman of Signals

Officer specialisations (recently decreased from 7 to 3)

- Landing Craft Officer
- Mountain Leader
- Signals Officer

Training for these specialisations may be undertaken at CTCRM or in a tri-service training centre such as the Defence School of Transport at Leconfield, the Defence School of Electronic and Mechanical Engineering (DSEME) at MOD Lyneham, Wiltshire, Defence Helicopter Flying School (pilots/aircrew) or the Defence School of Policing and Guarding.

Some marines are trained in military parachuting to allow flexibility of insertion methods for all force elements. Marines complete this training at RAF Brize Norton but are not required to undergo Pre-Parachute Selection Course (P-Company) training due to the arduous nature of the commando course they have already completed.

== See also ==
- Royal Marines
- P company
- Special Boat Service
