= Abdul Razak Mohd Yusof =

Malaysian police officer (born 1963)

Yang Berbahagia Dato' Abdul Razak Mohd Yusof SP DIMP BMS SDK PKT BKT
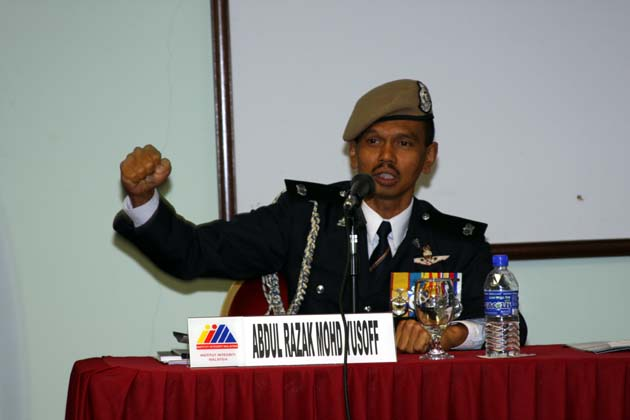
- Razak in 2025 after retired on Dec 2023
- Born: 10 February 1963 (age 63); Telok Mas, Malacca, Federation of Malaya
- Spouse: Datin Hjh Nazirah Bidin
- Children: five
- Military career
- Allegiance: Malaysia
- Branch: Royal Malaysia Police
- Service years: 1986–2023
- Rank: Deputy Commissioner of Police
- Nicknames: Pak Ndak Razak ,Tokndak
- Service number: G/10958
- Unit: VAT 69 Commando
- Conflicts: Second Malayan Emergency; Operations 304
- Awards: Seri Pahlawan Gagah Perkasa; Star of Order of Loyalty to Sultan Abdul Halim Mu'adzam Shah; Conspicuous Gallantry Medal; Commendable Service Star; Order of the Crown of Pahang
- Other work: Martial arts of Silat practitioner

Abdul Razak bin Mohd Yusof (born 10 February 1963) is a former senior police officer, martial artist and one of the national heroes from the Royal Malaysia Police 69 Commando of the Pasukan Gerakan Khas (English: Police Special Operations Command). He is a recipient of the Grand Knight of Valour (S.P.) award, the highest federal award of Malaysia.

== Early life ==
Born on 10 February 1963 in Batu 6, Telok Mas, Malacca and growing up in Langgar, Alor Setar, Kedah, Razak is the son of former police sergeant 26969 Haji Mohd Yusoff Bin Haji Salleh and a housewife, Hajjah Bashah Binti Din. He was very interested in religious knowledge and the Silat Melayu. At the age of 9 years, he learned Silat Melayu and managed to memorise a number of verses of the Quran and Hadith.

His dedication in studying religious books and learning about Islamic studies at religious school around the Kedah and also his attitude for staying neutral for any political party has made him respected and revered in places he grew up (at Langgar Limbong). According to Abdul Razak, he was inspired by his Tassawuf teacher known as "Abah Anom", Principal of the Suryalaya Religious School, at Tasek Malaya, Indonesia. He then completed his studies up to the STPM level at the Sultan Abdul Hamid College with Five Principles achievement and later continued his study at the National Defence University of Malaysia in Advanced Diploma – Strategic Defence and expected to be complete in June 2010.

== Police career ==
He joined the police force on 14 September 1986 as Probationary Inspector and underwent Kursus Asas Pasukan Polis Hutan (English: Police Field Force Basic Course) in Ulu Kinta, Perak. After completion of training, he was assigned to the 69 Commando Unit, Police Field Force (Malay: Unit Komando 69, Pasukan Polis Hutan).

Based on the desire for more challenging task, Abdul Razak voluntarily following the 69 Commando Initial Selection and subsequently the Basic 69 Commando Unit Course, Police Field Force; now known as 69 Commando of Pasukan Gerakan Khas after the separation of the 69 Commando Unit from the Police Field Force (now General Operations Force) in 1997. He passed successfully and was recognised as a member of the Commandos on 18 July 1987. Razak was promotion by field by the Inspector-General of Police on 3 August 2000 due his bravely at Sauk siege. Razak was promoted to Deputy Commissioner of Police and served as Pahang Deputy Police Chief on 23 August 2022.

To complement his skills, he attended a series of training courses, including: –

1. Rappelling course and abseiling,
2. Basic Airborne Course and Free Airborne,
3. Platoon Commander Course, organised by General Operations Force Training Centre (GOFTC), Ulu Kinta,
4. Pathfinder, organised by PULPAK, Malaysian Armed Forces at Sungai Udang, Malacca,
5. Escort Security/Bodyguard,
6. Counter-terrorist Team,
7. Tactical Diving Courses,
8. Disaster Management at the Police College Kuala Kubu Baru,
9. Mines Defusing Course, organised by GOFTC,
10. Special Operations Techniques, organised by US Army SOCPAC,
11. Staff Paper Writing Workshop, organised by the Senior Police College,
12. Negotiation Skills Workshop, hosted by Senior Police College,
13. Hostage Negotiation Skills, organised by the Anti-terrorist Assistance Program at the Louisiana State Police Academy, United States,
14. Critical Incident Management Course, organised by the Anti-terrorist Assistance Program at the Louisiana State Police Academy, USA,
15. Hostage Crisis Negotiation Skills and organised by the RMP with the New Scotland Yard Metropolitan Police Service in Kuala Lumpur,
16. Counter Maritime Interdiction Course, organised by the Naval Special Warfare – 1st Unit, United States Navy SEALs,
17. Company Commander; the highest course, organised by the GOFTC, and
18. Incident Response Training for Crisis Management, organised by the Senior Police Officers College, Cheras.

=== Appointments held ===
Over 20 years task in 69 Commando, he was tasked to the Squadrons and the various branches, including:

1. Commanding officer, 5th Troop, Bravo Squadron from 21 September 1987
2. Commanding officer, 14th Troop, Delta Squadron from 18 September 1988
3. Commanding officer, 1st Troop, Alpha Squadron from 11 April 1994
4. Commanding officer, 11th Troops, also the 2nd IC of Charlie Squadron from 20 October 1997
5. Commanding officer, Training Branch from 1 August 2000
6. Commander, Bravo Squadron from 16 March 2006
7. Deputy commander of 69 Commando, Pasukan Gerakan Khas from 2011
8. Commander of 69 Commando, Pasukan Gerakan Khas from 2018
9. Pahang deputy police chief from 23 August 2022 until 10 February 2023

=== Operations involved ===
During the duties in the 69 Commando, he was involved with various operations in the jungle, in the city, on the borders and territorial waters, including:

1. Ops Bersih IV – Search and defusing not less than 73 mines in the border of Malaysia – Thailand.
2. Ops Ulang Zabri – Search and find remnants of the Communist bandits in the middle of the jungle between the Perak and Kelantan.
3. Ops Tayang – Patrol task at Sabah waters and the Philippines to combating pirates after the pirates captured the town of Semporna.
4. Ops Topeng – Leading his team defeated three armed robbers who robbed a jewelry store in Ipoh and successfully recovered the jewelry at about RM 1 million valued.
5. Ops Kerbau – Managed himself has to capture the armed robber a life who must wanted by the Special Branch at Padang Besar, Perlis.
6. Ops Bubut – Hunting, fighting pirates and gather intelligence after the Abu Sayyaf kidnapped 23 tourists and the peoples of this country at Sipadan Island.
7. Operation 304 – He managed to infiltrate enemy stronghold and negotiate with the leader of Al-Ma'unah for over two hours to get the enemy ready to surrender without bloodshed.
8. Beside the duties against criminals, he also often involved in the close protections the Prime Minister and other national dignitaries who came during the sitting of the G-15, APEC, SUKOM, NAM, and others.
9. He is also involved in search and rescue operations, among them: finding the body, arms, a proofs at an underwater, finding the plane crash in the deep jungle, such as 'Ops. Piper' in April 2004; in which he led the team managed to find the missing pilot found in Genting Bidai, Pahang,
10. Besides the formal operations, during training dive in Pangkor Island, he was requested to help Pangkor Police Chief to capture an individual who often terrorise and intimidate the population with long knives. Unarmed, he managed to arrest the man who was feared by concerned without any injury at all.

== Operation 304 ==
The operations that forever synonyms with Abdul Razak is the suppression of the Al-Ma'unah militants led by Mohammed Amin Bin Razali without bloodshed. He led 20 members of 69 Commando unit that were initially ordered to fire tear gas into the Al-Ma'unah hideout in the forest at Sauk, Perak and managed to infiltrate the hideout and held talks with Mohammed Amin and ordered him and his men to surrender to the government. After more than two hours of negotiation, finally Abdul Razak manage to persuade Mohamed Amin (through the use of his knowledge of the religion and theology) to surrender without bloodshed.

== Honours for valor ==
In recognition of Abdul Razak conspicuous gallantry and intrepidity at the risk of his life above and beyond the call of duty in Operation 304, Razak was awarded the highest Federal award for bravery, The Grand Knight of Valour by His Majesty the late Sultan Salahuddin Abdul Aziz Shah in 2001. Abduk Razak actions are in keeping with the highest traditions of policing and reflect great credit upon himself, his unit, and Royal Malaysia Police. Among the other medals received for his service and devotion were:

- Malaysia
  - Recipient of the Grand Knight of Valour (SP) (2001)
- Kedah
  - Companion of the Order of Loyalty to the Royal House of Kedah (SDK) (2016)
  - Star of the Order of Loyalty to Sultan Abdul Halim Mu'adzam Shah (BMS) (2003)
- Malacca
  - Recipient of the Commendable Service Star (BKT) (2000)
- Pahang
  - Knight Companion of the Order of the Crown of Pahang (DIMP) – Dato' (2021)
- Selangor
  - Recipient of the Conspicuous Gallantry Medal (PKT)

== Family ==
Razak is the fifth of the eight siblings and the Bayu family. His brothers is Latif and Rahim, an A Class Bumiputera contractors who are experienced and successful in the Sabah and Selangor. His third sister in the family that Sabariah is a government official in Bangi Selangor. Roslah is a post-graduate teachers in Kemaman, Terengganu. His younger sister is Rozita (also a Masters graduate teachers in Puncak Alam, Selangor) and Rohayati a homemaker. While his youngest brother, Hisham (regional program manager, at one multinational company) settled in Kulim, Kedah.

He has ended his bachelor days by registering the name as the first bride who jumped from the aircraft using a parachute to the wedding ceremony and presented the flowers to be brought down to his wife Nazirah Binti Bidin, a teacher at the 19 November 1994 and has five children's:

1. Kautsar Binti Abdul Razak; 19 June 1996 (age 30)
2. Muhammad Faqih Bin Abdul Razak; 30 November 1997 (age 28)
3. Tasnim Binti Abdul Razak; 4 January 1999 (age 27)
4. Salsabila Binti Abdul Razak; 13 September 2006 (age 20)
5. Afnaane Binti Abdul Razak; 20 July 2008 (age 18)

== Management, Sports and branching into other fields ==
In the area of administration, he restructured the Training Branch of the store, handle not less than eight courses parachute either, rappelling / abseiling, boat handling and diving every year. Sending an officers and members to the course at Thailand Police Airborne School in Hua Hin, manage parachuting purchases paperwork, diving and boat handling. He's also contributed his creativity to create Gayung Perang as the identity of the 69 Commando unit. Razak also received not less than 30 Letter of Appreciation from the State dignitaries, national and carnivals and sports promoters.

In the field of sports, he was involved: –

1. Represent North Brigade in the sport of rugby in 1990 and 1996.
2. Represent North Brigade in sports art Silat Police, manager and coach from 1993 to 1999. Police emerged champions in 1999.
3. Representing the 69 Commando in Tae Kwan Do Championships (ITF) Silver open. Overall champion three times in a row in 1991 and 1993.
4. Appointed as the Rugby 69 Commando from 1993 until now.
5. Appointed as vice-president of the Karate Association of Perak in 1994 and 1996.
6. This is a referee who is recognised by the Federal Aeronautics Airborne Internationale in sports.
7. It is a coach, referee and judges who are recognised by the Federal Silat National (PESAKA).
8. As the Officer in Charge of the Training Branch, he has successfully guided the police team into national champions in the sport of parachuting, whether in the event Accuracy, Formation Skydiving and Canopy Formation.
9. Many involved in the demonstration as participants and technical officials of martial arts and parachute across the country and overseas to Bali, Jakarta, Saudi Arabia, China and the United Arab Emirates.
10. One of the country jumpers parachuting expedition in the South Pole.
11. Represents squadrons/branches in football and sepak takraw.

== Social Responsibility ==
In the social field, he has been involved in:

1. Chairman of the Islamic Religious Affairs 69 Commando from 1993 to 1999.
2. Identity Advisory Dr. Burharuddin School, Taiping Perak in 1992 and 1993.
3. Death Benefit Plan Representative Northern Brigade in 1994.
4. Wajadiri Advisory Teachers College Ipoh from 1992 to 1999.
5. Advisory Jatidari / Wajadiri REAL Public Housing Plan, Ulu Kinta in 2000/2001.
6. Chairman of the Family Fitness Child Care Centre Ash-Syakirin Islam in 2002/2005.
