= Al-Ma'unah =

Islamic sect focused on spirituality and militancy based in Malaysia

Al-Ma'unah is an Islamic sect and spiritual militant group based in Malaysia. The group was made famous by their audacious raid on 2 July 2000 on a camp of Malaysian Army Reserve mobilised in the early hours of the morning and stealing weapons from the armory. The group was later cornered in the village of Sauk, Kuala Kangsar, Perak and was involved in a stand-off against the Malaysian Army and Royal Malaysian Police forces. The stand-off, known as the Sauk Siege, ended when Malaysian security forces, including the army 22nd Grup Gerak Khas (22nd GGK) and police VAT 69 Pasukan Gerakan Khas, stormed the camp in Operation Dawn.

== Description ==
The group's full name was Persaudaraan Ilmu Dalam Al-Ma’unah (Brotherhood of Inner Power) or Al-Ma'unah in short. The group had a website which explained that Al-Ma'unah was an organisation "involved in the teaching of martial arts particularly the development of one’s inner power and the practice of Islamic traditional medicine". The term "Ma’unah" supposedly means something extraordinary (paranormal) that happens to an ordinary Muslim individual. The group claimed membership of 1000 Ikhwan spread throughout Malaysia, Brunei, Singapore, Egypt and Saudi Arabia. Their motto is Berilmu, Beramal, Beriman, Bertaqwa or in Arabic: العليم والمؤمن والخيري والتقوى. The motto symbolises their supreme power over the Muslim brotherhood throughout the country and their spirit to defend Islam. Nowadays, it is usually found at the religious school mottos. The sect has been identified as part of the Salafi Movement.

== Impact ==
=== Social impact ===
Al-Ma'unah is characterised as a sect by the Malaysian authorities and not as a rebel or terrorist group like Jemaah Islamiah. But for all the slickness of the two arms heists, the group's previous actions amounted to taking a few potshots at a Hindu temple at Batu Caves, breweries on the outskirts of Kuala Lumpur, and a power company's electric tower. The Al-Ma'unah case is regarded as an isolated episode in Malaysia.

The leader of the group, Mohamed Amin, was a former army private, but also arrested among the 26 in the Sauk siege included a Royal Malaysian Air Force (RMAF) major, an analyst, an insurance agent, a Malaysia France Institute lecturer and an executive with Proton. "It shows that how religion is used and manipulated is still a real problem in Malaysia," says Kamarulnizam Abdullah, coordinator of the Strategic and Security Studies Unit at the Universiti Kebangsaan Malaysia (National University of Malaysia). "The government has to do something". The Malaysian authorities clamped down hard on deviant activities as a result of the Al Ma'unah tragedy.

Police also tightened laws on the sale of police and military uniforms. Those who wanted to trade and produce police and military uniforms and insignias would need a police permit, a condition introduced following the Al-Maunah incident.

=== Political impact ===
Some people believed that the Sauk incident was stage managed by the Government of Malaysia under then Prime Minister Mahathir Mohamad. This belief was because of the apparent ease that the Al Ma'unah Group talked their way through the army guards into allowing them into the camp and seizing the arms and ammunition.

This ease projected a "shocking laxity in military discipline and security whereby vast cache of high-calibre weaponry could be robbed from two military camps, as it involves an unacceptable degree of military irresponsibility and negligence", according to then opposition leader Lim Kit Siang. Kit Siang also questioned the death of the third person, Abdul Halim Ali, one of the gang members.

Lim Kit Siang questioned the Government's action in using the Internal Security Act to detain the 27 Al-Ma’unah members arrested at Bukit Jenalik instead of charging them for their corresponding criminal offences. Lim alleges that it is a major and multiple blow to the reputation and credibility of the police, the Attorney-General, the Deputy Prime Minister and the Prime Minister as the use of the Internal Security Act gives signs of a “cover-up” operation and will undermine public confidence in the White Paper on the Al-Ma’unah arms heists and atrocities, according to Lim.

The Pan-Malaysian Islamic Party (PAS), through its Secretary-General, Nasharudin Mat Isa, reiterated their belief while refusing to apologise for the accusation of the United Malays National Organisation (UMNO) for stage managing the tragedy.

The Al Ma'unah group was later charged under Section 121 of the Penal Code, conviction under which carries with it two penalties in the alternative, death or life imprisonment, and a third sentence that if the death penalty is not pronounced, a convicted person shall also be liable to a fine.

== See also ==
- Sauk Siege
- Capital punishment in Malaysia
- Memali incident
- Terrorism in Malaysia
