= RMAF Ground Defence Force =

Unit of the Royal Malaysian Air Force

- Pasukan Pertahanan Darat TUDM
- Active: 1 April 1980–17 March 1999; 1 June 2020–present
- Country: Malaysia
- Branch: Royal Malaysian Air Force
- Type: Air force ground forces
- Role: Security forces; Airbase security; Ground combat; Rapid intervention; Air-mobile operations
- Size: 10 squadrons and 4 flights
- Part of: RMAF Regiment
- Headquarters: RMAF Jugra Air Base
- Nicknames: "RMAF HANDAU", "HANDAU"
- Anniversaries: 1 April
- Engagements: Communist insurgency in Malaysia (1968–1989)

The Royal Malaysian Air Force Ground Defence Force (RMAF GDF; Malay: Pasukan Pertahanan Darat TUDM), commonly known by its historical acronym HANDAU, is a ground defence formation of the Royal Malaysian Air Force (RMAF). Operating under the RMAF Regiment, the unit provides ground defence and base security across RMAF airfields and installations.

HANDAU was formed in 1980 in response to communist insurgent attacks against RMAF installations, taking over airbase security duties from the Malaysian Army's Royal Military Police Corps. The unit's evolution is closely linked with the development of the RMAF's ground combat and special operations capabilities.

After a period in which its squadrons were reassigned as RMAF Provost units, the formation was reactivated as the RMAF Ground Defence Force in 2020. Alongside its primary role in airbase security, the reactivated force assumed expanded ground defence responsibilities. Official training includes tactical marksmanship, tracking, Military Operations on Urbanised Terrain (MOUT), force down operations, Fly Away Security (FAS), and quick-reaction counter-sabotage tactics.

HANDAU also participates in airfield seizure and recapture exercises, utilising tactical insertion via RMAF transport aircraft to support broader air operations.

== History ==
=== Created as Security Forces ===
Initially, the Royal Malaysian Air Force (RMAF) relied on the Malaysian Army's Malaysian Military Police Corps, now known as the Royal Military Police Corps, for security at its air bases. However, in 1974, a mortar attack by Malayan Communist Party members on the RMAF Kuala Lumpur Air Base caused some damage. In 1979, another mortar attack at the same base caused more serious damage, destroying an RMAF DHC-4 Caribou transport aircraft.

The 1974 incident prompted the Air Force Headquarters to revise its standard operating procedures for air base security. By the end of 1976, a team led by Group Captain Abdul Kadir Abu Bakar, Squadron Leader Lai Kiat Meng, and Flight Lieutenant Mior Rosli proposed establishing a dedicated security unit under the RMAF, modelled after the Royal Air Force's RAF Regiment. The proposal was approved, and an experimental unit was formed under Flight Lieutenant Mior Rosli's leadership. Corporal Mahazir became the first RMAF airman to receive commando training at the Special Warfare Training Centre in Malacca, followed by more airmen undergoing similar training. A year after the 1979 mortar attack, a squadron from this unit was ready for duty.

On 1 April 1980, the unit was officially established as the Royal Malaysian Air Force Ground and Air Defence Force (Malay: Pasukan Pertahanan Darat dan Udara), taking over security responsibilities from the Malaysian Military Police Corps at the RMAF Kuala Lumpur Air Base. The unit became popularly known by its Malay abbreviation, HANDAU, and it was placed under the RMAF Security Regiment, which is now known as the RMAF Regiment. (Note: 'HANDAU' abbreviated from Pasukan PertaHAN DArat dan Udara)

=== Restructured as Military Police ===
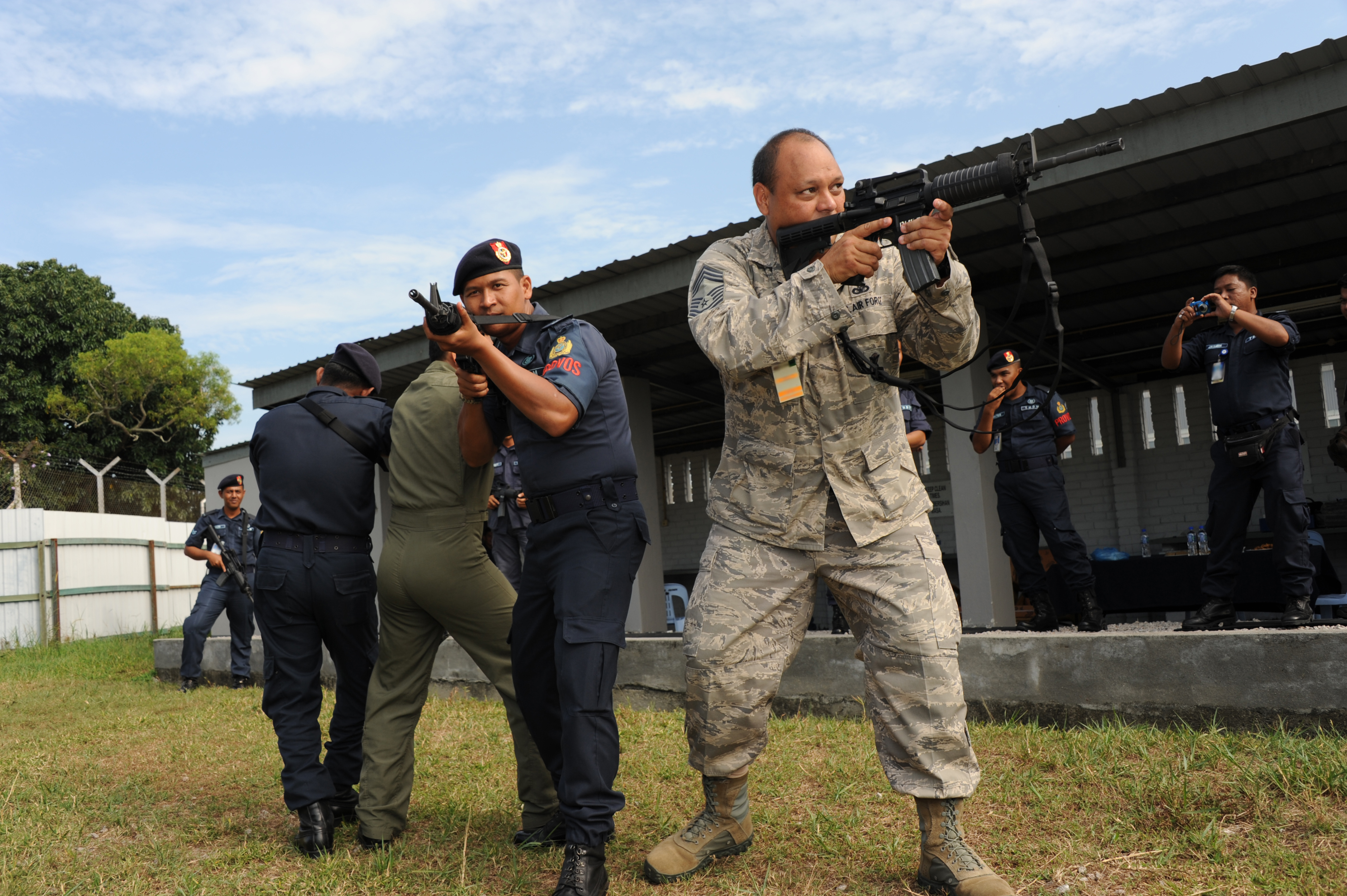
Members of the RMAF Provost participated in Military Operations in Urban Terrain (MOUT) training alongside the U.S. Air Force during the 2012 Cope Taufan exercise.

In 1983, HANDAU underwent a restructuring. HANDAU incorporated additional military police roles after completely taking over the responsibilities from the Malaysian Military Police Corps. In addition to security forces and military police roles, a detachment of Malaysian Army commandos was attached to HANDAU, forming two special operations sections specialising in search and rescue and air assault roles. These sections were known as the Combat Air Rescue Team (Malay: Tim Penyelamat Tempur Udara) and the Rapid Deployment Force (Malay: Pasukan Gerak Cepat).

Around 1993, HANDAU's official name was changed to RMAF Provost to reflect the shift in its primary responsibilities from security forces to military police while still retaining its security forces capabilities. In 1995, Air Force Command transferred the role of air defence from the RMAF Provost to the RMAF Ground Base Air Defence. The RMAF Ground Base Air Defence, an artillery formation responsible for air defence, operates under the command of the air bases where they are stationed.

=== Separated from RMAF Regiment ===
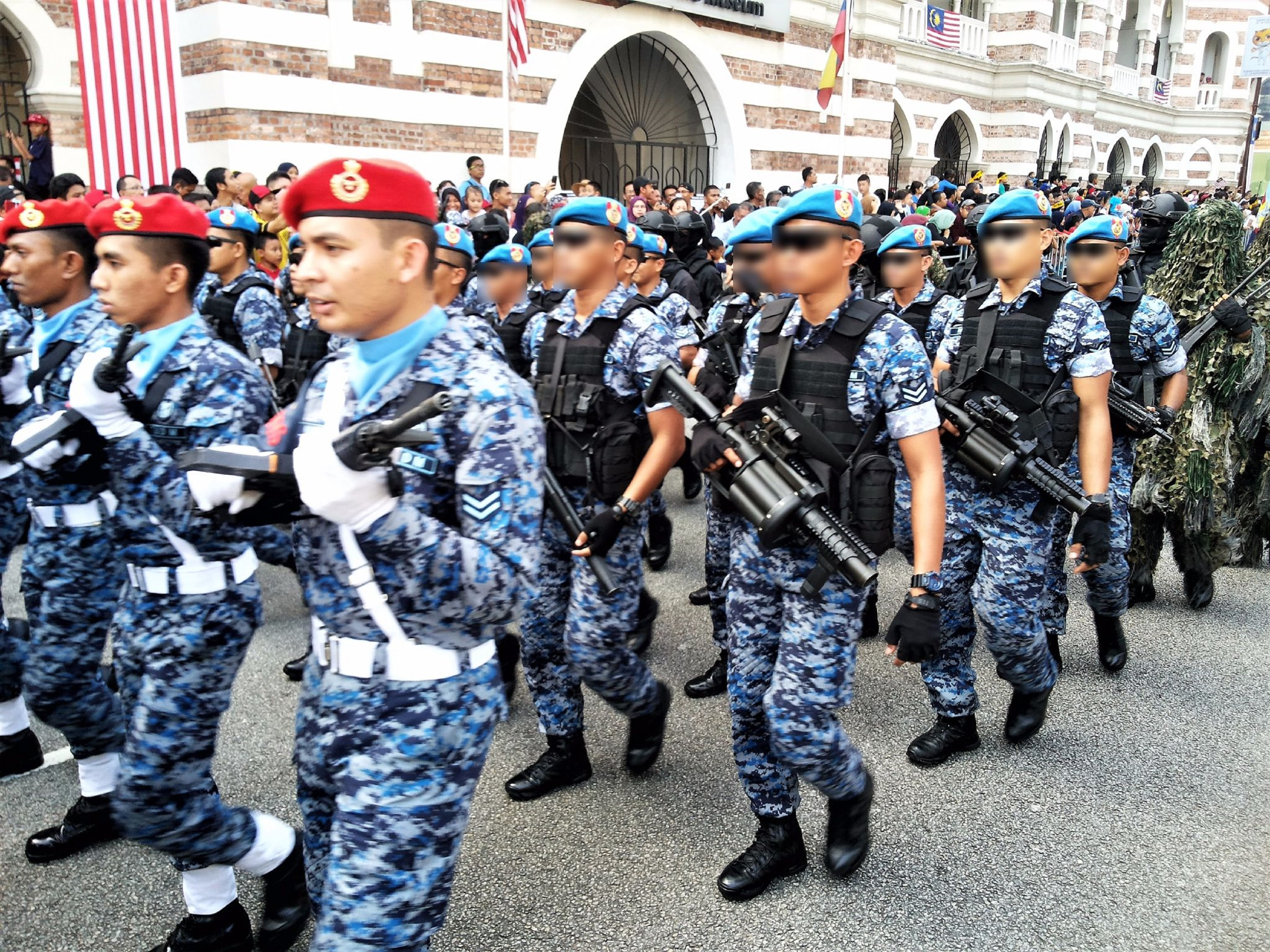
RMAF Provost airmen wearing their red berets marched alongside RMAF Special Forces commandos during the 2017 Merdeka Day Parade.

On 17 March 1999, Air Force Headquarters detached the RMAF Provost Squadrons from the RMAF Regiment. This left the regiment comprised solely of special operations elements (the precursor to the modern RMAF Special Forces, PASKAU). Concurrently, the RMAF Regiment relocated to a new garrison at RMAF Jugra Air Base in Banting, Selangor. The provost squadrons were placed under the newly created RMAF Provost Marshal Department to oversee all military police functions within the service. The department was initially headquartered at RMAF Kuala Lumpur Air Base.

Following the decommissioning of RMAF Kuala Lumpur Air Base in 2018, the RMAF Provost Marshal Department headquarters moved to RMAF Sendayan Air Base.

=== Reactivation ===
On 1 June 2020, HANDAU was reactivated as the RMAF Ground Defence Force under the RMAF's Capability Development 55 (CAP55) roadmap.

This restructuring followed a realignment of the RMAF's ground-based air defence architecture, which saw air defence assets transferred to dedicated RMAF Ground Base Air Defence units. Concurrently, several personnel from the RMAF Provost branch were reassigned to staff the reactivated HANDAU squadrons.

Assigned once again to the RMAF Regiment, the formation retained its original HANDAU moniker. While resuming its primary base protection role, its operational mandate was expanded to include specialised ground combat and tactical operations.

== Roles and capabilities ==
=== Airbase security and defence ===
HANDAU's primary role is the ground defence and security of RMAF air bases, installations, and assets. Its personnel safeguard airfield infrastructure, aircraft, equipment, and service members against armed assault, intrusion, sabotage, and other security threats. Airbase protection forms the core function of HANDAU, distinguishing it from the RMAF Special Forces (PASKAU).

=== Ground combat ===
Beyond static perimeter security, HANDAU performs active ground combat and light infantry missions. Personnel receive training to operate outside fixed defensive positions, track hostiles, and counter armed threats in the areas surrounding RMAF installations. The unit's syllabus covers tactical marksmanship, tracking, Military Operations in Urban Terrain (MOUT), rapid intervention, and infantry tactics. These skills allow HANDAU to conduct mobile ground defence operations and conventional airbase protection tasks.

MOUT training prepares personnel for tactical operations in built-up areas and urban battlefields. HANDAU units were seen conducting urban combat training, demonstrating their ability to deploy beyond base perimeters.

Training also incorporates small unmanned aerial systems (sUAS) for tactical support. These platforms supply real-time reconnaissance and surveillance, with specific systems configured for strike roles. Integrating sUAS grants HANDAU teams enhanced situational awareness and organic aerial support during ground actions.

=== Quick reaction and specialised tasks ===
Selected personnel within HANDAU squadrons are assigned to the Rapid Intervention Team (Malay: Tim Atur Cepat, TAC), which provides immediate armed response to security breaches. The TAC is trained in advanced combat marksmanship, urban combat, counter-infiltration, and Valuable and Strategic Assets in Transit (VSAIT) escort operations.

HANDAU units also provide specialised support functions across two key areas:

- Force Down Operations: Securing aircraft, aircrews, and surrounding perimeters following forced landings, emergency diversions, or security incidents at unsecured locations.
- Fly Away Security (FAS): Deploying specialised security detachments onboard RMAF aircraft to safeguard personnel, cargo, and assets when operating at civilian airfields or austere overseas locations lacking organic RMAF force protection.

=== Air-mobile operations ===
HANDAU participates in exercise scenarios involving airfield capture and recapture operations. During the 89th Malaysian Armed Forces Day demonstration in Kuantan Airbase, HANDAU personnel executed a tactical airfield assault following insertion from an RMAF C-130 Hercules transport aircraft using Tactical Air Landing Operations (TALO) procedures.

== Structure ==
=== During communist insurgency in Malaysia (1968–1989) ===
RMAF Regiment
  - No. 102 Squadron HANDAU, based at RMAF Kuala Lumpur Air Base
  - No. 103 Squadron HANDAU, based at RMAF Kuantan Air Base
  - No. 104 Squadron HANDAU, based at RMAF Butterworth Air Base
  - No. 105 Squadron HANDAU, based at RMAF Kuching Air Base
  - No. 106 Squadron HANDAU, based at RMAF Labuan Air Base
  - No. 107 Squadron HANDAU, based at RMAF Alor Setar Air Base
  - No. 109 Squadron HANDAU, based at RMAF Aircraft Overhaul Depot (DEBKAT) in Subang
  - No. 201 Squadron HANDAU, based at RMAF Jugra Air Base
  - No. 202 Squadron HANDAU, based at RMAF Ipoh Air Base
  - No. 204 Squadron HANDAU, based at RMAF Kluang Air Base (present-day Kluang Airport)
  - No. 208 Squadron HANDAU, based at RMAF Subang Air Base
  - Combat Air Rescue Team (combat search and rescue), based at RMAF Kuala Lumpur Air Base
  - Rapid Deployment Force (special operations), based at RMAF Kuala Lumpur Air Base

=== Current structure ===
==== Squadrons and flights ====
| Name (English) | Name (Bahasa Melayu) | Garrison |
|---|---|---|
| No. 211 Squadron HANDAU | Skuadron 211 HANDAU | RMAF Subang Air Base |
| No. 212 Squadron HANDAU | Skuadron 212 HANDAU | RMAF Gong Kedak Air Base |
| No. 213 Squadron HANDAU | Skuadron 213 HANDAU | RMAF Kuantan Air Base |
| No. 214 Squadron HANDAU | Skuadron 214 HANDAU | RMAF Butterworth Air Base |
| No. 215 Squadron HANDAU | Skuadron 215 HANDAU | RMAF Kuching Air Base |
| No. 216 Squadron HANDAU | Skuadron 216 HANDAU | RMAF Labuan Air Base |
| No. 217 Squadron HANDAU | Skuadron 217 HANDAU | RMAF Jugra Air Base |
| No. 221 Squadron HANDAU | Skuadron 221 HANDAU | RMAF Sendayan Air Base |
| No. 222 Squadron HANDAU | Skuadron 222 HANDAU | RMAF Alor Setar Air Base |
| No. 223 Squadron HANDAU | Skuadron 223 HANDAU | RMAF Ipoh Air Base |
| No. 231 Flight HANDAU | Flait 231 HANDAU | RMAF Bukit Lunchu Air Force Base |
| No. 232 Flight HANDAU | Flait 232 HANDAU | RMAF Kota Samarahan Air Force Base |
| No. 233 Flight HANDAU | Flait 233 HANDAU | RMAF Bukit Ibam Air Force Base |
| No. 234 Flight HANDAU | Flait 234 HANDAU | RMAF Kinrara Air Force Base |

==== Rapid Intervention Team ====
The Rapid Intervention Team (RIT; Malay: Tim Atur Cepat, TAC) serves as the primary rapid response element within HANDAU squadrons. Operating as a high-readiness tactical unit, TAC personnel undergo specialised training in combat marksmanship and immediate-intervention tactics to counter active threats, including base intrusions, sabotage, and high-risk security breaches.

== Uniforms and insignia ==
=== 'HANDAU' Shoulder Flash ===
The RAF Regiment's mudguard.

Members of the RMAF Ground and Air Defence Force have worn the 'HANDAU' shoulder flash on their combat uniforms since the unit's establishment in 1980. The tab, which is an abbreviation of the Malay name for the RMAF Ground and Air Defence Force, was inspired by the RAF Regiment's "Mudguards" shoulder flash.

Even after the HANDAU squadrons were restructured into military police, the special forces element of the unit continued to use the 'HANDAU' shoulder flash until 2002, when they adopted the 'PASKAU' shoulder flash following a name change.

When the HANDAU squadrons were reactivated in 2020, the RMAF Ground Defence Force resumed the tradition of wearing the 'HANDAU' shoulder flash.

=== RMAF Ground Defence Insignia ===
The RMAF Ground Defence insignia is a badge worn on the front left pocket of any uniform. The insignia features a crossed tekpi with a triangle in the centre, containing an owl inside the triangle. This design is set against the RMAF Regiment colours and is shaped like a shield with a castle wall design on top.

=== RMAF Blue Digital Camouflage Combat Uniform ===
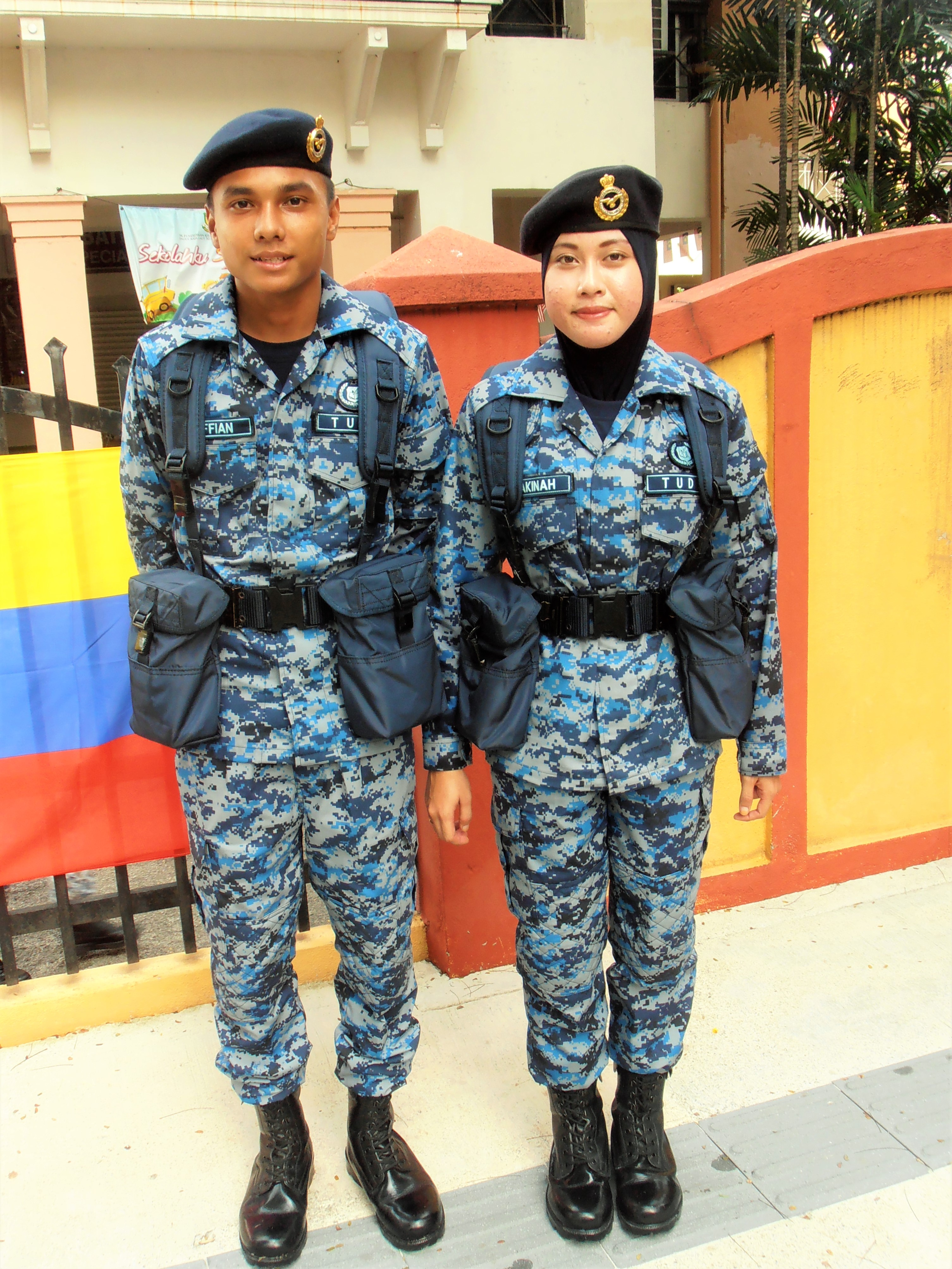
Two airmen and airwomen are seen wearing the RMAF No.4 Digital Camouflage Combat Uniform, which was introduced around 2016.

The RMAF Ground Defence Force is the only ground-based combat unit that wears the new RMAF blue digital camouflage combat uniform. Other ground-based combat units, such as the RMAF Special Forces and the RMAF Ground Base Air Defence, use green tiger-striped combat uniforms.

=== Navy Blue Beret with RMAF Regiment Beret Backing ===
As part of the RMAF Regiment, members of the RMAF Ground Defence Force don the RMAF's navy blue beret with the red RMAF Regiment beret backing.

== Selection and training ==
The selection and training for the RMAF Ground Defence Force are open to all ranks within the RMAF. However, officers' responsibilities are limited to administrative roles. For other ranks, airmen or recruits must choose the 'Auxiliary Defence Technician' trade (Malay: Ketukangan Pembantu Tahan) before they can proceed to the RMAF Ground Defence Force pipeline. This pipeline is conducted by instructors from the RMAF Combat Training School.

=== RMAF Ground Defence Course (4 weeks) ===
This 4-week course, known as Kursus Pertahanan Darat TUDM in Malay, consists of three modules designed to expose candidates to the full spectrum of tasks they will face upon graduating from the course. The modules are as follows:

Deployment Tasks Module

Known as Modul Penugasan Atur Gerak in Malay, this module trains airmen in ground combat skills such as small arms handling and tactics, marksmanship, basic tracker, basic close-quarters combat, and an introduction to urban warfare.

Passive Ground Defence Module

Known as Modul Pertahanan Darat Pasif in Malay, this module teaches candidates how to camouflage large-scale facilities, such as air bases or radar installations, from aerial detection.

Active Ground Defence Module

Known as Modul Pertahanan Darat Aktif in Malay, this module trains candidates to create a ground defence area that can be patrolled, cleared of obstacles and cover, protected with detection systems, and guarded by defence forces. Essentially, candidates learn how to fortify and guard military facilities.

=== Graduation ===
At the end of the RMAF Ground Defence Course, graduates are awarded the RMAF Ground Defence Insignia by senior officers in a simple graduation ceremony.

== Lineage ==
| 1980 | 1993 Separated | 2020 CAP 55 |
|---|---|---|
| RMAF Air and Ground Defence Force | RMAF Provost | RMAF Ground Defence Force |
| RMAF Air and Ground Defence Force | RMAF Provost | RMAF Provost |
| RMAF Air and Ground Defence Force | RMAF Special Air Service | RMAF Special Forces (Note: In 2002, this unit underwent a name change from Pasukan Khas Udara, or Special Air Service in English, to Pasukan Khas TUDM, abbreviated as PASKAU, or RMAF Special Forces in English.) |

== See also ==
- United States Air Force Security Forces
- RMAF Special Forces
- RMAF Ground Base Air Defence
- RMAF Provost
- 10th Parachute Brigade – Air-mobile unit.
- 18th Battalion (Parachute), Royal Malay Regiment – Air assault-focused unit in the Malaysian Armed Forces.
