= RMAF Jugra Air Base =

Royal Malaysian Air Force's heliport and ground regiment headquarters

Jugra Air Base
- Pangkalan Udara Jugra
- Jugra; Near Banting in Malaysia

Site information
- Type: Air Force Base
- Owner: Ministry of Defence
- Operator: Royal Malaysian Air Force
- Controlled by: RMAF Regiment

Location
- Coordinates: 2.823°N 101.453°E

Site history
- Built: 1971

Garrison information
- Garrison: RMAF Special Forces HQ; RMAF Ground Defence Force HQ
- Occupants: Hostage Rescue Team; Maritime Para Rescue Squadron; 217th HANDAU Squadron; Parachute Training Flight

Airfield information
- Identifiers: ICAO: WMBJ
Helipads
Number	Length and surface
	20 metres (66 ft) Concrete

The Jugra Air Base (Malay: Pangkalan Udara Jugra), a heliport and military installation under the Royal Malaysian Air Force, is situated approximately 20 kilometres (12 mi) from Klang and just 5 kilometres (3.1 mi) from the Straits of Malacca. Also known as RMAF Jugra, Kem Jugra (Camp Jugra) and Rejimen TUDM Jugra, this base serves as the home for both the Royal Malaysian Air Force (RMAF) special forces and infantry units.

Although it is officially a heliport, it has not functioned as one since the 2016 Sikorsky S-61A-4 Nuri crash. Today, it serves as the headquarters for the RMAF Regiment. The air base may resume functioning as a heliport once they introduce a replacement for the Sikorsky S-61A-4 Nuri helicopter.

As of 2019, a CAC Sabre is reported to be on display at the base.

== History ==
=== Pre-WWII: Planned to be established as an airfield ===
Jugra boasts a rich history as a naturally defensible location. In the 19th century, Bukit Jugra (lit. 'Jugra Hill' or 'Mount Jugra') (Note: Western societies do not name lower elevated places as 'Hill'; instead, they refer to such locations as 'Mount'. For example, Mont-Saint-Michel in France and Mount Manisty in England are lower, elevated places named "Mount". Thus, this place can be known as Mount Jugra in English.) was fortified as a fort by the 4th Sultan of Selangor, Sultan Abdul Samad. In 1940, the Royal Navy purchased a piece of land approximately 2 kilometres (1.2 mi) from today's Jugra Air Base with the intention of establishing it as an airfield for Royal Naval Air Service (RNAS) use. The base was named RNAS Morib, but construction never commenced due to the Japanese Imperial Army's attacks on Malaya, which began in November 1941.

=== Established as a radar site and air defence centre ===
In 1971, the Air Force Command officially established a radar site at the peak of Bukit Jugra and named it TUDM Bukit Jugra, or RMAF Bukit Jugra Air Force Base in English. The RMAF installed a Marconi S600 radar at the site, making the base the second air defence centre in Malaysia. On 21 December 1972, the centre was officially inaugurated.

=== Relocated to a new location and designated as a heliport ===
On 27 August 1987, the Air Force Command relocated RMAF Bukit Jugra Air Force Base to a site approximately 3 kilometres (1.9 mi) from the radar site, naming it Pangkalan Udara Jugra or Jugra Air Base in English. The base was designed as a heliport, with one of its primary functions being the conduct of search and rescue missions in the Straits of Malacca region. A squadron of the RMAF Air and Ground Defence Force, popularly known as the RMAF HANDAU, was established here to serve as the security force for this air base. This squadron is designated as the 201st HANDAU Squadron.

In 1993, the radar site and air defence centre located at the peak of Bukit Jugra was officially closed down as the 310 Squadron Sector Operation Center 1 at Butterworth Air Base took over the responsibility of the air defence centre from Jugra Air Base. The equipment from Bukit Jugra was transferred to Sarawak, to what is now known as Kota Samarahan Air Force Base.

=== The RMAF Regiment relocated here ===
On 17 March 1999, the Air Force Command relocated the RMAF Regiment and its associated units from Kuala Lumpur Air Base to this location. With this move, Jugra Air Base, besides serving as a heliport, also became a garrison for special forces, and special forces selection began to take place here. The helicopters stationed at Jugra Air Base were also tasked with assisting the special forces in missions and training activities.

=== Ceased functioning as a heliport ===
On 4 October 2016, an RMAF Sikorsky S-61A-4 Nuri helicopter crashed at a school in Tawau, Sabah. The crash resulted in injuries to 22 people, including 13 RMAF personnel, 8 schoolchildren, and 1 school staff member. Following this incident, all 24 Sikorsky S-61A-4 Nuri helicopters in Malaysia were grounded. While a few helicopters were later permitted to fly again after upgrades, they were ultimately phased out due to maintenance costs and the unavailability of service parts. Consequently, since the 2016 incident, Jugra Air Base has ceased to function as a heliport.

=== Stopped conducting special forces selection ===
After the establishment of the RMAF Combat Training School on 1 March 2018 at Bukit Ibam Air Force Base, the Jugra Air Base ceased to conduct special forces selection. The RMAF Combat Training School, situated within the Air Education and Training Command, serves as a training centre for ground combat training of air force personnel. It employs instructors from various units within the RMAF Regiment. However, advanced courses such as parachute and free-fall training are still conducted at Jugra Air Base by the Parachute Training Flight of the RMAF Combat Training School.

=== A new ground force squadron was established here ===
Under Capability Development 55 (CAP55), a plan aimed at restructuring and modernising the RMAF from 2018 to 2055, the Air Force Command reactivated the RMAF HANDAU on 1 June 2020. Air Force Command reassigned the RMAF HANDAU squadrons to the RMAF Regiment. As a result, the 217th HANDAU Squadron was garrisoned here at Jugra Air Base.

== Tenant units ==
Among the units garrisoned at Jugra Air Base are:

Combat Units:

RMAF Regiment Headquarters
  - RMAF Special Forces Headquarters
    - Maritime Para Rescue Squadron
    - Force Protection Squadron
      - Hostage Rescue Team
  - RMAF Ground Defence Force Headquarters
    - 217th HANDAU Squadron

Training:

RMAF Combat Training School
  - Parachute Training Flight
