= RMAF Regiment =

Royal Malaysian Air Force's ground and special forces regiment

- Rejimen TUDM
- Founded: 1 April 1980; 45 years ago
- Country: Malaysia
- Branch: Royal Malaysian Air Force
- Type: Air force ground forces and special forces formation
- Part of: Air Operations Command
- Headquarters: RMAF Jugra Air Base
- Colors: (Amaranth Red, Maya Blue, Navy Blue and Air force Golden Yellow)
- Anniversaries: 1 April

Commanders
- Current commander: Brigadier General Mohd Zairul Hisham Muhamad Ibrahim RMAF
- Colonel-in-chief: Sultan Abdullah of Pahang

Insignia
- Cap badge backing

The Royal Malaysian Air Force Regiment (Abbr.: RMAF Regiment, Malay: Rejimen Tentera Udara Diraja Malaysia – Rejimen TUDM, Jawi: ريجيمن تنترا اودارا دراج مليسيا) is a ground-based formation that is part of the Royal Malaysian Air Force. It comprises units that serve as special forces, air force infantry, security forces, and ground combat instructors. The regiment's headquarters are located at RMAF Jugra Air Base in Banting, Selangor.

Brigadier General Mohd Zairul Hisham Muhamad Ibrahim RMAF is the current commander of the RMAF Regiment, having succeeded Brigadier General Meor Ahmad Kamal Meor Termizi RMAF on 24 April 2024.

== History ==
=== RMAF Security Regiment ===
The Royal Malaysian Air Force (RMAF) established the RMAF Security Regiment on 1 April 1980, at RMAF Kuala Lumpur Air Base as a command for the Royal Malaysian Air Force Air and Ground Defence Force (RMAF HANDAU) squadrons. RMAF HANDAU, the security forces of the RMAF, later expanded to 11 squadrons spread throughout Malaysia.

=== Renamed to RMAF Regiment ===
In June 1983, the RMAF underwent a restructuring that moved the RMAF Security Regiment from Air Force Command (Malay: Markas Tentera Udara) to Air Operations High Command (Malay: Markas Besar Operasi Udara—MABES, now known as Air Operations Command). During this restructuring, the RMAF Security Regiment was renamed the RMAF Regiment. Additionally, the RMAF Regiment established two special operations units under its authority: the Combat Air Rescue Team and the Rapid Deployment Force.

On 1 June 1993, the RMAF HANDAU squadrons under the regiment were renamed the RMAF Provost squadrons. Concurrently, the RMAF Regiment combined both special operations units into a new entity called Pasukan Khas Udara (PKU) (Note: This directly translates to Special Air Service in English.) in Malay, which has been known as the RMAF Special Forces (PASKAU) since 2002.

=== Relocated to RMAF Jugra Air Base; Provost squadrons separated from the RMAF Regiment ===
On 17 March 1999, the Air Force Command separated the RMAF Provost squadrons from the RMAF Regiment, leaving only the special forces elements under the RMAF Regiment. At the same time, the RMAF Regiment relocated to a new garrison, RMAF Jugra Air Base, located in Banting, Selangor.

=== Colonel-in-Chief ===
On 24 January 2008, Sultan Ahmad Shah of Pahang was appointed Colonel-in-chief of the regiment. His Royal Highness was honoured with the blue beret of RMAF Special Forces by the then Chief of Air Force, General Azizan Ariffin RMAF, during a ceremony at the RMAF Jugra Air Base in Banting, Selangor.

=== RMAF Combat Training School established ===
On 1 March 2018, the RMAF Combat Training School officially began operations. The school, which falls under the Air Education and Training Command, employed instructors from units within the RMAF Regiment. Consequently, the RMAF Regiment is no longer responsible for conducting special forces selections.

=== HANDAU units were reactivated and reattached to the RMAF Regiment ===
Under the Capability Development 55 (CAP55), a plan to restructure and modernise the RMAF from 2018 to 2055, the Air Force Command reactivated RMAF HANDAU on 1 June 2020. Some personnel from the existing RMAF Provost squadrons were retrained as RMAF HANDAU squadrons. As a result, the RMAF Provost was split and solely tasked with military police duties, while the RMAF HANDAU assumed roles such as air force infantry and security forces. The Air Force Command reattached the RMAF HANDAU squadrons to the RMAF Regiment.

== Structure ==
The RMAF Regiment, previously known as the RMAF Security Regiment, has undergone multiple restructurings since its establishment in 1980. The following are the various structures the RMAF Regiment has had:

=== 1980–2020 ===
1980–1993

RMAF Security Regiment
  - Royal Malaysian Air Force Air and Ground Defence Force (RMAF HANDAU)
    - HANDAU squadrons (x11 squadrons)
    - Air Rescue Team
    - Rapid Deployment Force

1993–1999

RMAF Regiment
  - RMAF Provost Squadrons
  - Pasukan Khas Udara (RMAF Special Air Service)
    - Rapid Deployment Force
    - Combat Air Rescue Team

1999–2002

RMAF Regiment
  - RMAF Jugra Air Base
  - RMAF Special Air Service

2002–2020

RMAF Regiment
  - RMAF Jugra Air Base
  - RMAF Special Forces (PASKAU)

=== Current structure ===
The RMAF Regiment's organisational structure, as updated in 2020

At present, the RMAF Regiment comprises two combat units, an air base, and an education detachment. Although it serves as a ground combat formation within the Royal Malaysian Air Force, not all ground combat formations fall under its purview. For instance, the RMAF Ground Base Air Defence (RMAF GBAD) operates independently of the RMAF Regiment. (Note: The RMAF GBAD is an artillery formation within the Royal Malaysian Air Force, responsible for delivering short-range and medium-range air defence for the Royal Malaysian Air Force's air bases.)

RMAF Regiment structure as of 2020
Insignia	Units Name (English)	Units Name (Bahasa Melayu)	Abbr.	EST.	Notes/Roles
	RMAF Ground Defence Force	Pasukan Pertahanan Darat TUDM	HANDAU	1980	Initially created to provide security for RMAF air bases, this unit evolved into the military police for the RMAF. By 2020, it underwent restructuring to become a combat unit within the RMAF, resuming its original security forces duties while also assuming new responsibilities as air force infantry.
	RMAF Special Forces	Pasukan Khas TUDM	PASKAU	1993	Formed in 1993 by merging special operations units under HANDAU, this unit serves as the special forces of the RMAF. Its roles include hostage rescue, forward air control, combat search and rescue, and other special operations-related tasks.
	RMAF Jugra Air Base	Pangkalan Udara TUDM Jugra	PU Jugra	1999	The RMAF Regiment fully controls this air base, also known as Rejimen TUDM Jugra and Camp Jugra. The headquarters of the RMAF Regiment is located here.

In addition to the mentioned units, there is also a flight of RMAF Regiment personnel attached to the RMAF Combat Training School in Rompin, Pahang. They serve as ground combat instructors and provide training support roles within the school.
