= Air force ground forces =

Land warfare units of an air force

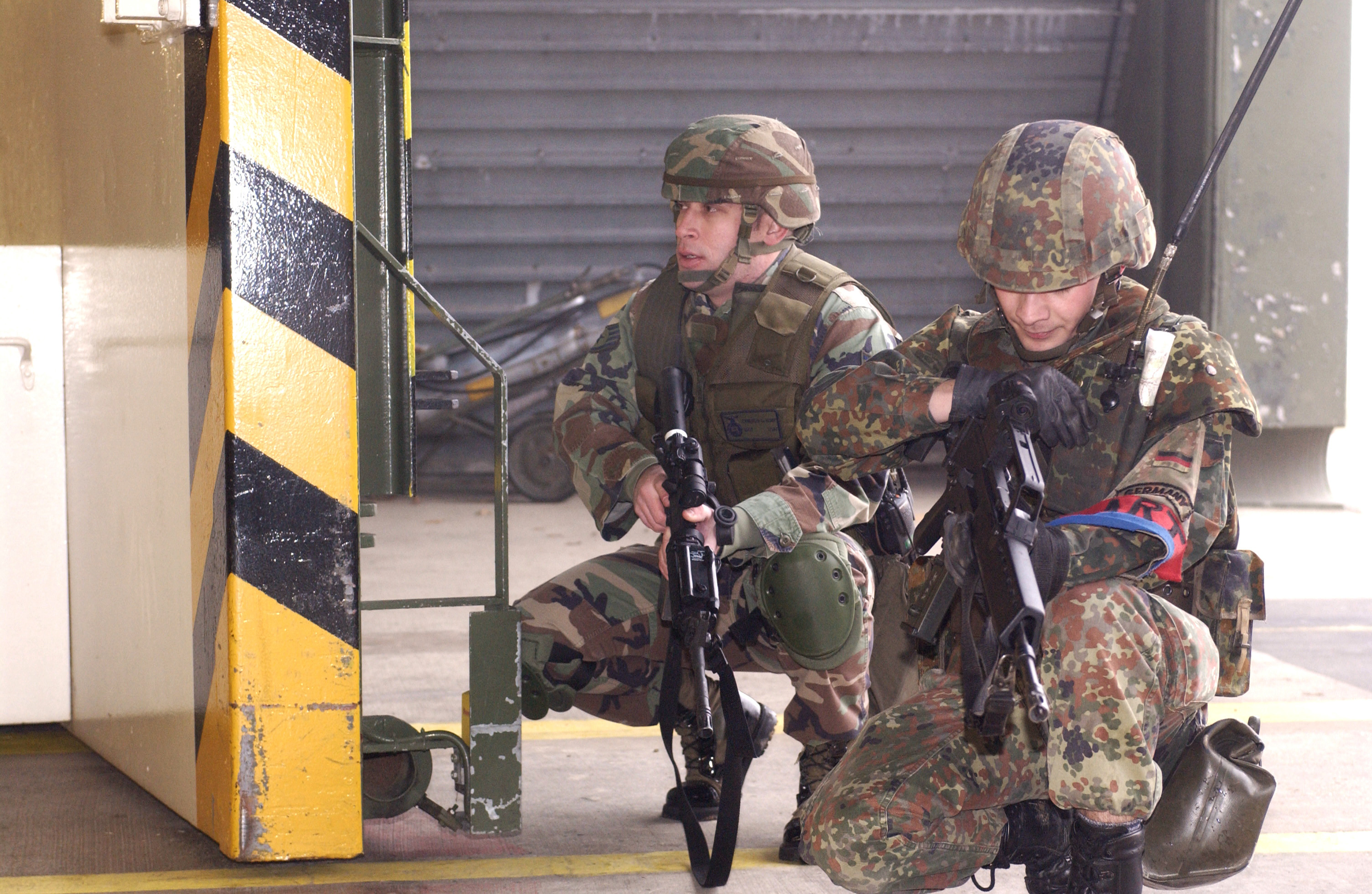
An airman of the German Air Force Regiment (right) together with a United States Air Force Security Forces airman during a counterterrorism exercise at Büchel Air Base in Germany, 2007.

Air force ground forces are the land warfare forces of an air force. They may include special forces, infantry, security forces, military police. Airmen assigned to such units may be trained, armed and equipped for ground combat and special operations.

== Rationale ==
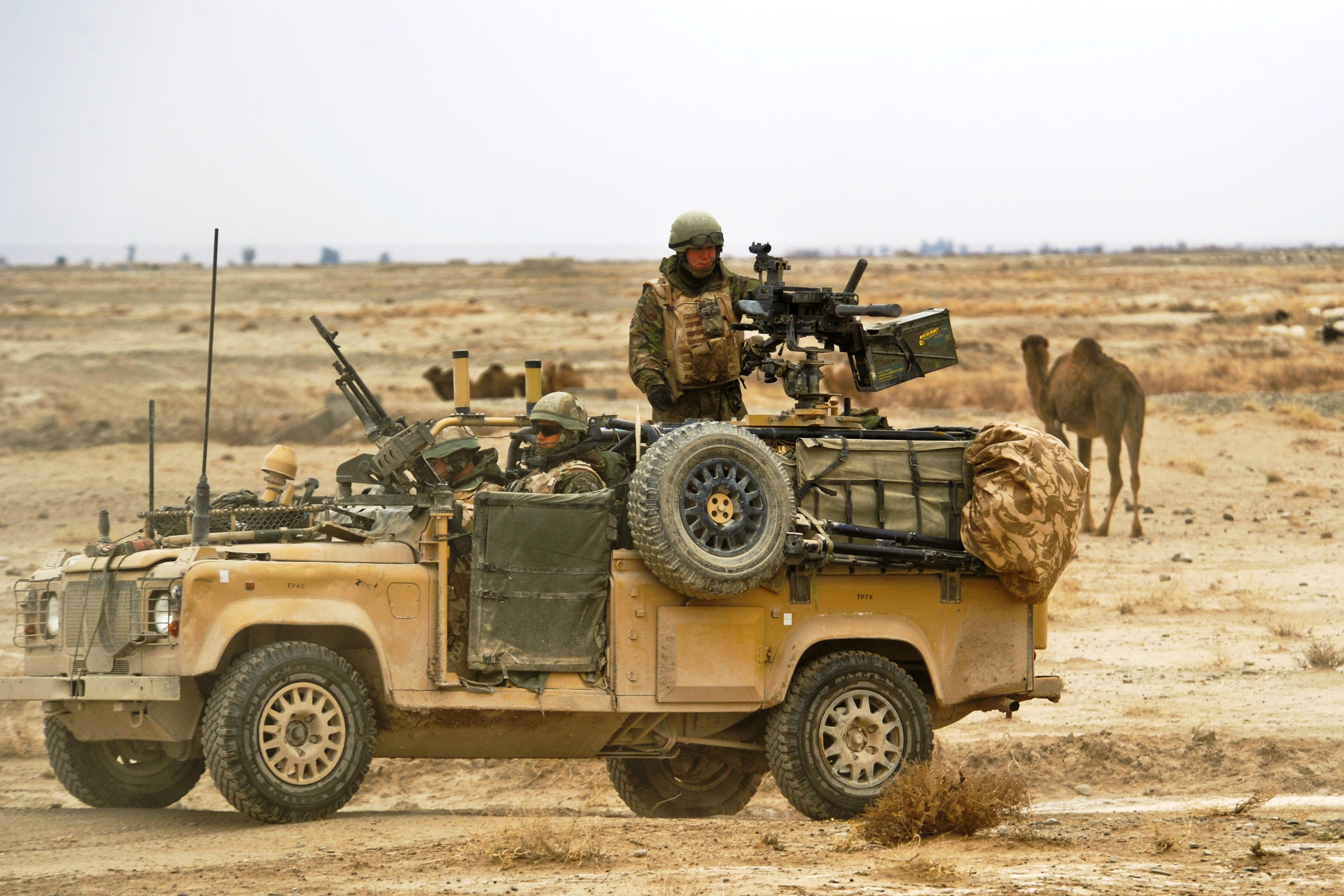
Personnel of the Royal Air Force Regiment in a Land Rover with a Weapons Mount Installation Kit ("Wimik"), stopped on a road while conducting a combat mission near Kandahar Airfield, Afghanistan, in 2010.

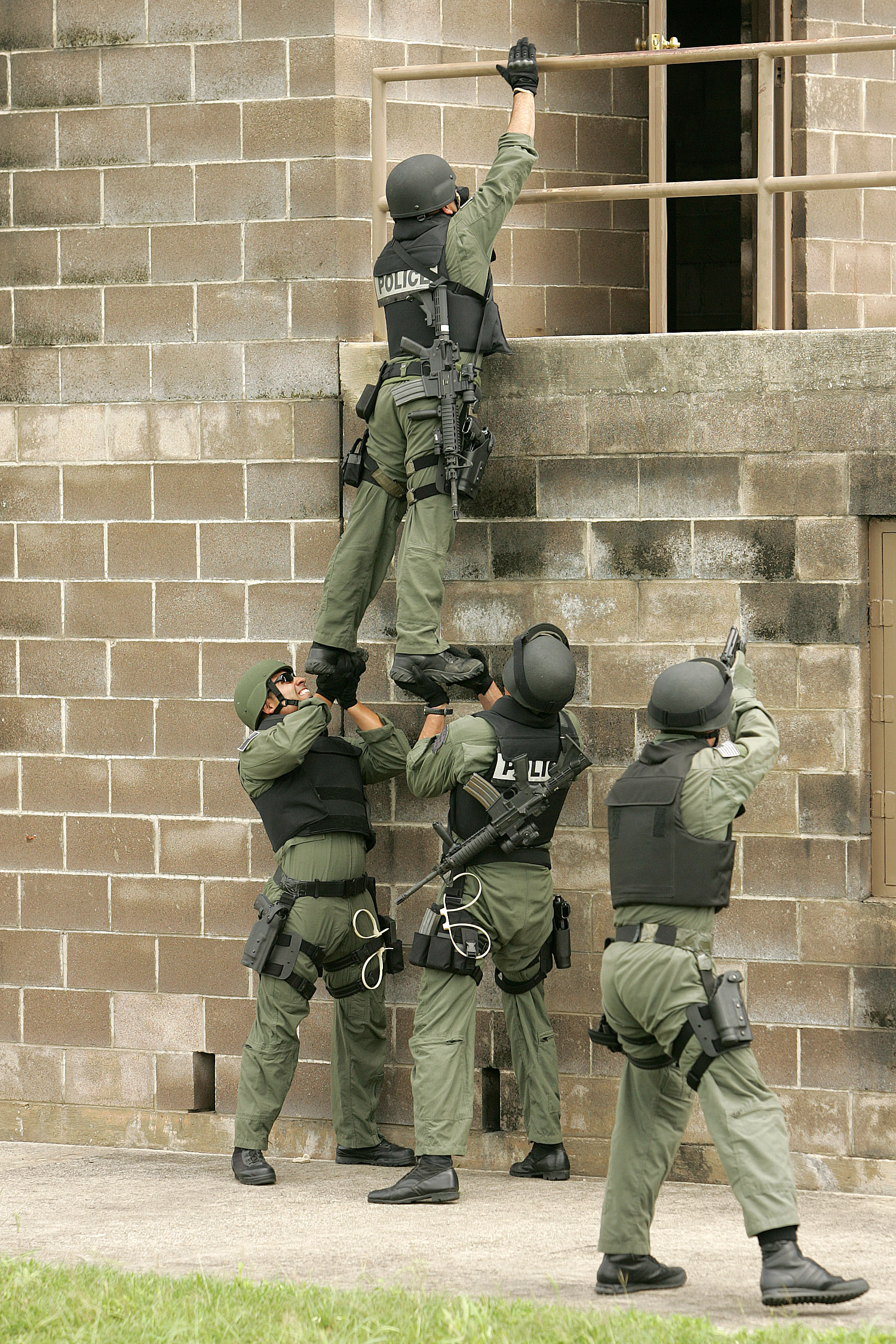
U.S. Air Force 37th Training Wing's Emergency Services Team use a team lift technique to enter a target building during training at Lackland Air Force Base, Texas, on April 24, 2007.

Traditionally the primary rationale for air force ground forces is for force protection. Aircraft are most vulnerable when on the ground, to offensive counter air operations, and most cannot operate without fixed infrastructure, consumables, and trained personnel. An adversary may hope to achieve air supremacy or protect itself from air attack first by attacking airbases, aircraft and other assets on the ground. Such attacks can be made by, for example, aircraft, cruise missiles and short range ballistic missiles. However, an adversary at a numerical, technological or other disadvantage may choose to attempt to disrupt flight operations by aiming to overrun or raid enemy air bases as early as possible, using blitzkrieg like tactics, for example Operation Barbarossa, or through the use of special operations forces and unconventional attacks, such as the Taliban raid on Camp Bastion.

To protect against attacks against airbases, and from being overrun, some air forces have a force dispersal doctrine that sees aircraft dispersed to secondary and emergency air bases, such as highway strips, and, as was the case with the Royal Air Force's vertical take off Harriers, dispersals in forest clearings or the Bas 60 and Bas 90 systems of the Swedish Air Force. However, when dispersed in such a way, aircraft and personnel are even more vulnerable to ground attacks.

To defend against ground attacks, most air forces train certain airmen in basic weapons handling skills and tactics.

Other than base and asset defence roles, air force ground forces may have other roles such as Chemical, Biological, Radiological and Nuclear (CBRN) defence, training other air force personnel in weapon skills and basic ground defence tactics, traditional combat operations, as well as providing leadership to other airmen in base defence roles. In addition to protecting their home bases and dispersals, air force ground forces will also provide force protection when air expeditionary forces are deployed abroad and of airheads during air bridge operations, usually being some of the first air force personnel on the ground. Moving towards the special operations spectrum of operations, is assaulting, capturing and securing of airfields for use by one's own aircraft.

Not all air forces possess their own ground units and whether or not they do or is sometimes due to other factors such as political considerations and inter-service rivalry. Such units act as a force multiplier allowing the secure operation of forward airbases and thereby increasing the availability and responsiveness of aviation assets.

=== Special operations forces ===
Some air forces also possess special operations forces, who perform roles on land and in marine environments in support of air force operations. These include units and individual personnel who operate independently or, with other military units.

The chief missions in such units are combat search and rescue, including rescuing downed aircrews in hostile territory; long-range reconnaissance, direct action and forward air control in support of air to ground operations, for example illuminating targets for attack by laser-guided bombs.

Other common roles include military weather forecasting, pathfinding, domestic counter terrorism and hostage rescue missions; capturing airbases, establishing advanced airfields and conducting air traffic control.

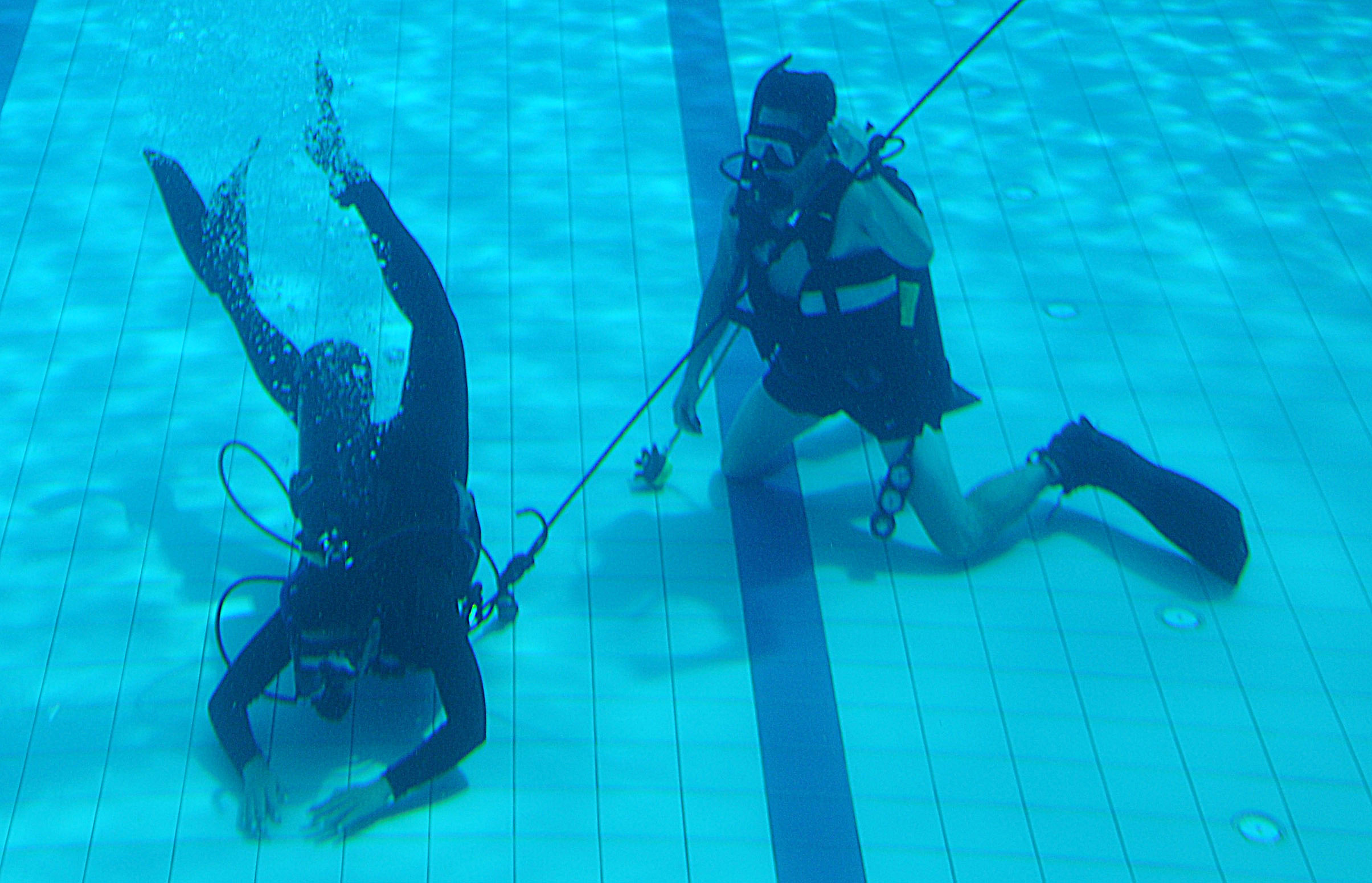
An American pararescueman from the 320th Special Tactics Squadron watches a Paskau member of the Royal Malaysian Air Force conduct a search pattern during an underwater search and recovery course.

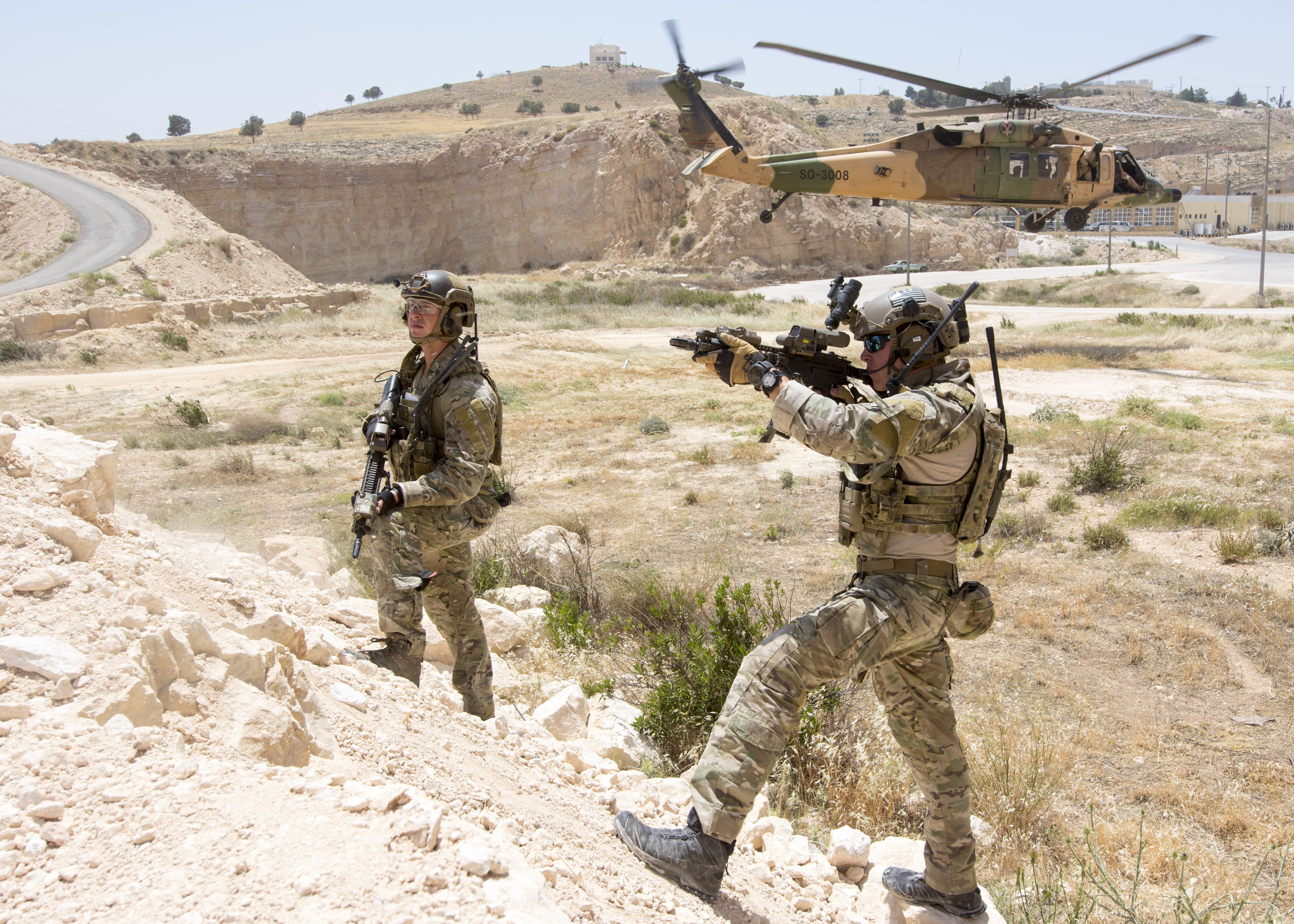
U.S. Air Force Special Tactics Commandos training in Jordan.

== Doctrine ==
In most forces a layered approach is used to deliver a defense in depth. Peacetime doctrine is to maintain the integrity of the perimeter through the use of watch posts and/or remote sensors, and if deemed necessary patrols within the perimeter. In the event of the perimeter being penetrated, heavily armed and mobile fast response units, often using armored vehicles, will attempt to intercept, identify and if necessary suppress the incursion. If attackers manage to gain entry into the working areas of the airbase, by subterfuge or other means, then the role of air force ground forces is to remove them using close quarter battle.

Wartime doctrine, in for example the RAF Regiment and USAF Security Forces, sees the addition of another layer through the use of aggressive patrolling outside the perimeter to deter, detect and destroy would be attackers. The area around the airbase is mapped and prearranged fire plans are put in place to allow patrols to call down rapid and accurate indirect fire from attached mortars and other crew served weapons.

== History ==
=== World War I ===
The Royal Naval Air Service (RNAS), one of the two British air arms that was amalgamated to create the RAF, operated an armoured car wing that grew in size to some 20 squadrons. Using at first unarmoured vehicles to pick up downed aircrew and for line of communications security duties, it was the RNAS which created the Rolls-Royce armoured cars, which it also used to raid and harass the Germans, thus beginning the tradition of RAF armoured car operations. These were then disbanded in 1915 and the vehicles transferred to the British Army.

=== World War II ===
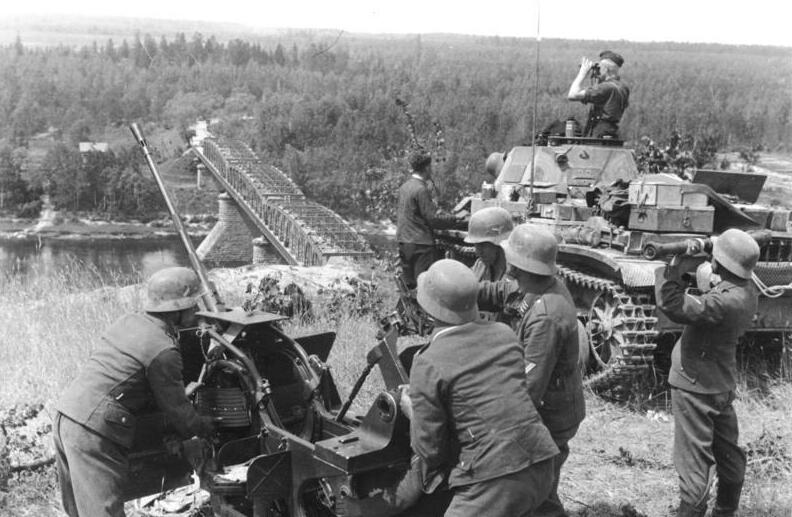
German Luftwaffe airmen operating a 2 cm Flak 38 anti-aircraft cannon alongside a Heer Panzer II light tank during Operation Barbarossa in 1941

During World War II, Luftwaffe doctrine was to operate as a tactical air force in support of the army providing air defence and close air support against ground targets. Due to political considerations all German air defences were placed in the hands of the Luftwaffe, and Luftwaffe Flak units were attached to army units to provide ground-based air defence. In addition to self-protection and air defence roles, these Luftwaffe troops, of for example the Flak Corps, were also called upon to use their Flak guns in fire support and anti-armour roles, and it was in the hands of Luftwaffe airmen that the German 88mm gun was first used against tanks.

Flying units were also expected to closely follow the advancing army and as such could be expected to encounter enemy combatants during counterattacks or who had not been cleared; because of this, all Luftwaffe personnel were trained to a higher level in infantry skills and tactics than was normal in other air forces of the time. Also because of political considerations German paratroopers, the Fallschirmjäger, were part of the air force. Later in the war with Germany facing a manpower shortage, rather than release its personnel to the German Army, Göring chose instead to create the Luftwaffe Field Divisions, using personnel surplus to the needs of flying operations; as cadre for these units, officers and non commissioned officers were transferred from the Flak and paratroop units.

One of the great successes of the German forces in World War II was the destruction of enemy air forces by over running them on the ground, and the use of airborne forces in advance and in support of ground operations. One of the vulnerabilities of this time was the loss of one's own airfields, which if captured would give the enemy the infrastructure needed to build an air-bridge, during the Battle of Crete the airfields were a key objective for the Germans, and their capture by paratroopers allowed their use by the gliders and transports of the main air landing force. The casualties in the Fallschirmjager were such that they were largely used as ground troops thereafter.

To guard against British airfields falling to German paratroops as Maleme had, Winston Churchill demanded that RAF airmen should be trained and equipped to defend themselves against ground attack. In a condemning memo to the Secretary of State for Air and to the Chief of the Air Staff dated June 29, 1941, Churchill stated he would no longer tolerate the shortcomings of the Royal Air Force (RAF), in which half a million RAF personnel had no combat role. He ordered that all airmen be armed and ready to "fight and die in defence of their airfields" and that "every airfield should be a stronghold of fighting air-ground men, and not the abode of uniformed civilians in the prime of life protected by detachments of soldiers". Amongst the measures implemented were improvised armoured cars, such as the Armadillo or Bison, and pillboxes, most notably the Pickett-Hamilton fort, which could be raised to block a runway. However, rather than training all airmen as infantry on the German model, the RAF created instead the RAF Regiment.

During the planning of the second front which became the invasion of Normandy, it was foreseen that as the allied armies advanced, aircraft operating from airfields in England would be decreasingly effective and that to maintain air cover allied fighter squadrons would need to accompany the advancing divisions. The RAF Commandos were created to service aircraft from newly built or captured airfields. However, they were fully commando trained and because of the forward nature of their operations, they were expected to help secure, make safe and defend from counterattack the airfields from which they operated.

=== Vietnam ===
In the face of US air superiority, North Vietnam resorted to attacking the United States Air Force on the ground, with infiltrators striking from both within and outside the perimeter. The United States Air Force Security Police defended against them.

First formed during World War II, the United States Air Force Security Police were dramatically reduced in scope following the war. Post war the newly established United States Air Force (USAF) saw its primary role as a strategic one. Its base defense doctrine thus was one of security policing. United States involvement in Vietnam, however, brought a real and sustained threat of ground attack. To meet these threats the Phu Cat Air Base Security Forces pioneered the Air Base Ground Defense doctrine that informs USAF practice to this day.

In a demarcation of combat roles the United States Army was primarily responsible for security outside of airbases, and the Republic of Vietnam Air Force for patrolling the internal perimeter. However, rather than just rely upon static defense, the United States Air Force pioneered the use of remote detection equipment, such as seismic detectors and ground surveillance radar, to detect infiltrators. Rifle squads responded, mounted in heavily armed Cadillac Gage Commando and M113 armored personnel carriers.

== List of air force ground units ==
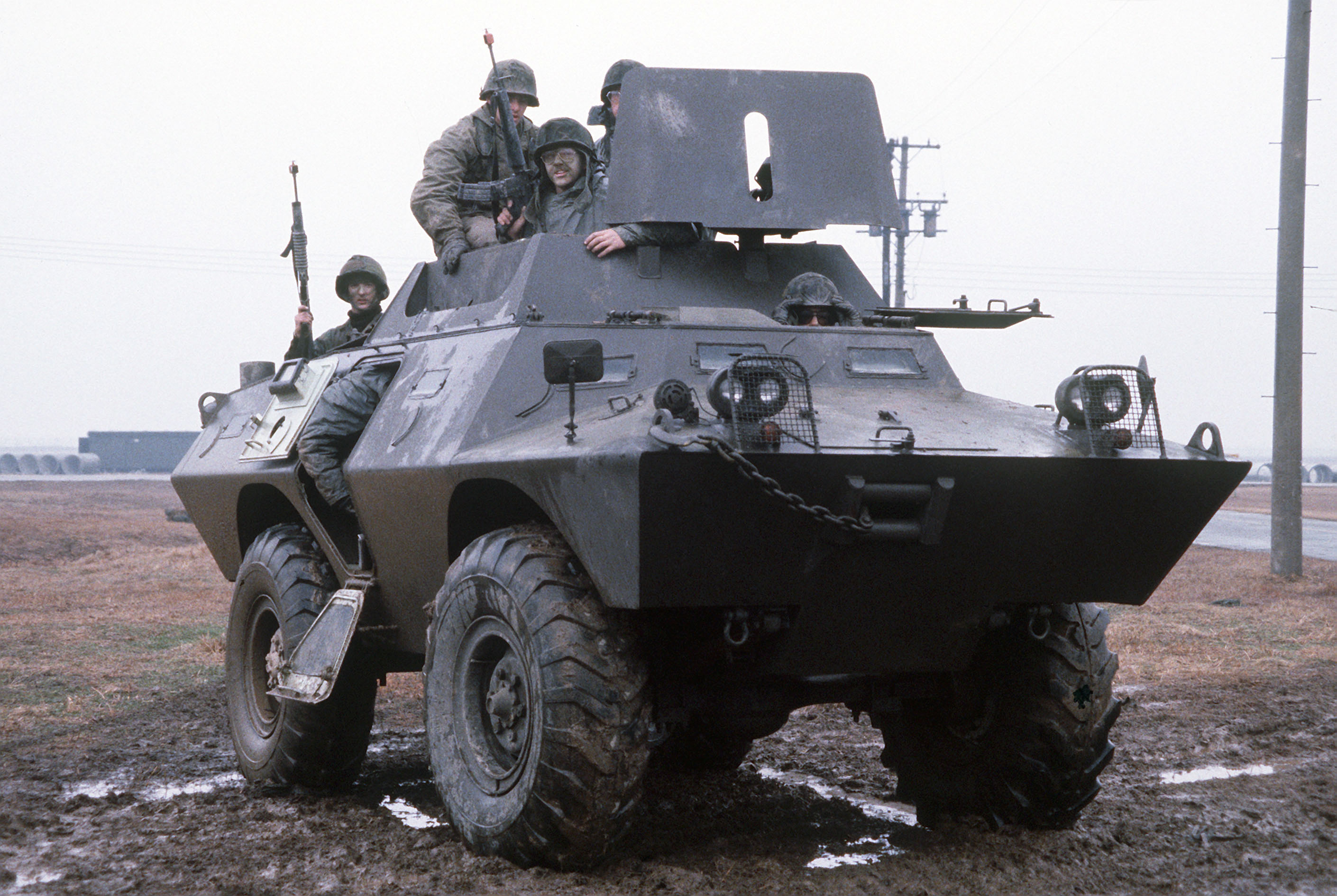
US Air Force CSP (Combat Security Police) aboard a V-100 (XM-706E2) during exercise Team Spirit '81

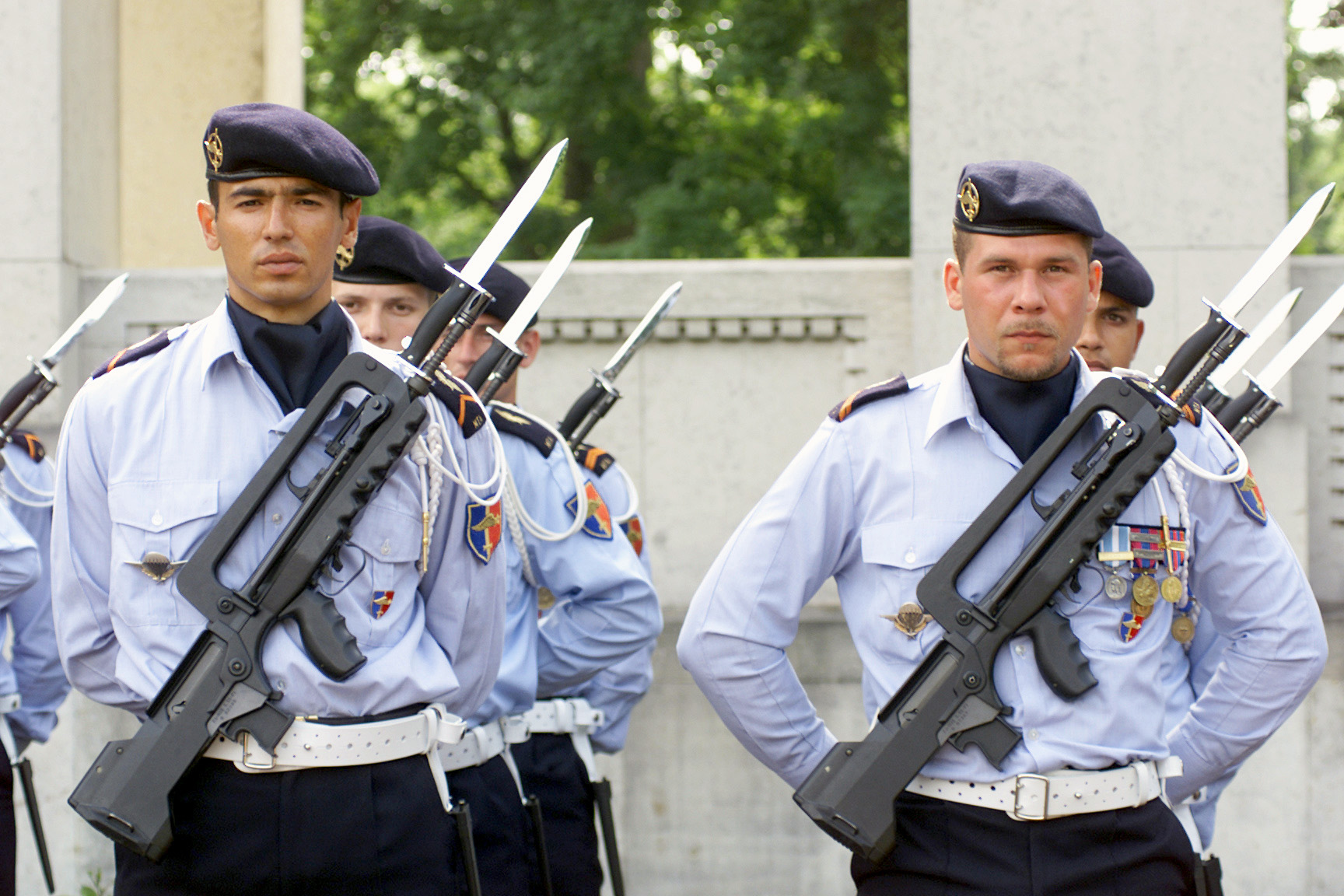
Members of the Fusiliers Commandos de l'Air of the French Air Force

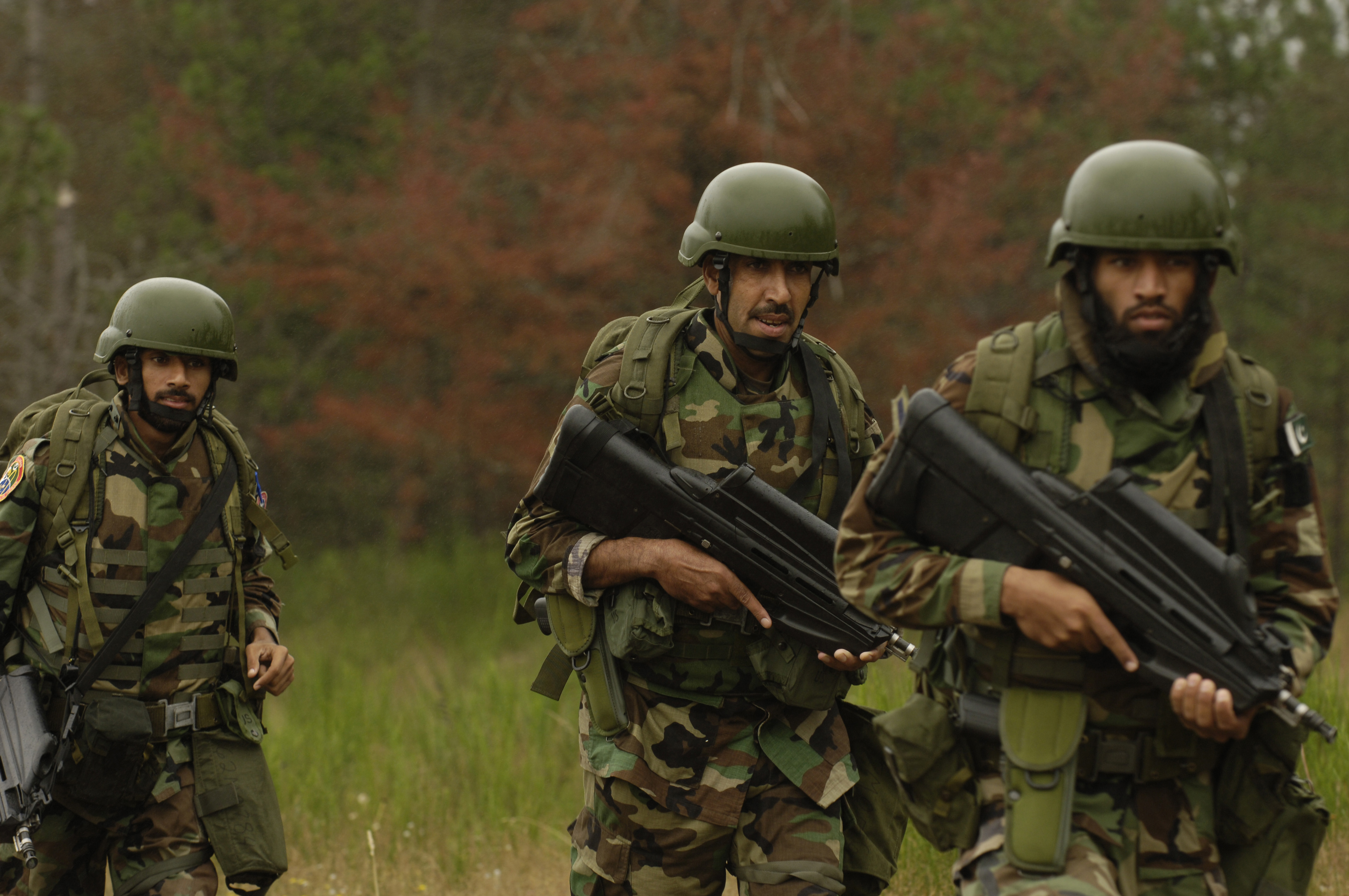
Airmen of the Special Service Wing of the Pakistan Air Force during training at Fort Lewis in 2007

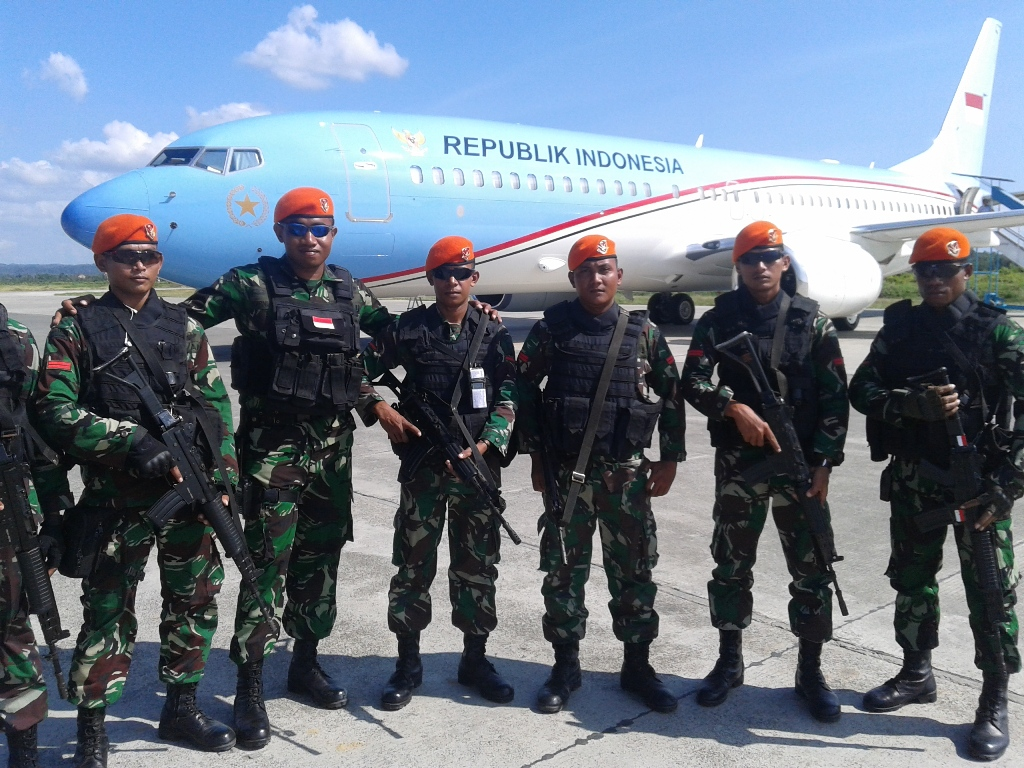
Indonesian Air Force commandos from the Kopasgat Corps in Biak Air Base

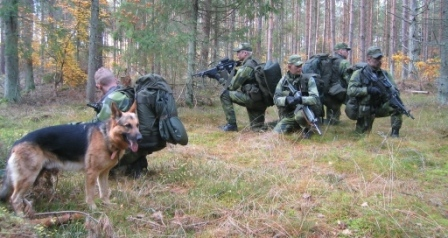
Swedish Air Force Rangers of the Swedish Air Force

- (Argentina) Special Operations Group
- (Australia) Airfield Defence Guards
  - (Australia) No. 1 Security Forces Squadron RAAF
  - (Australia) No. 2 Security Forces Squadron RAAF
- (Australia) No. 4 Squadron RAAF
- (Bangladesh) No. 41 Squadron (Special Force. Not air force infantry/ground force)
- (Bangladesh) 501 Air Regiment
- (Belgium) VVE-UDA / Force Protection Squadron
- (Brazil) Brazilian Air Force Infantry
  - (Brazil) Para-SAR
- (Chile) Agrupación Antisecuestros Aéreos
- (Chile) Comandos de Aviación
- (Chile) Infanteria de Aviación
- (China) PLAAF Airborne Corps
- (Colombia) Agrupación de Comandos Especiales Aéreos
- (Czech Republic) Czech Air Force Security Squadrons
- (Estonia) Estonian Air Force Base Defense Operations Center
- (France) Fusiliers Commandos de l'Air
- (Germany) German Air Force Regiment
- (Germany) Kampfretter
- (Greece) 31st Search and Rescue Operations Squadron (special force)
- (Greece) Hellenic Air Force Police
- (India) Garud Commando Force (special force)
- (Indonesia) Korpasgat Quick Reaction Corps
  - (Indonesia) Bravo Detachment 90
- (Israel) Unit 669
- (Israel) Unit 5101
- (Italy) 16º Stormo (Battaglione Fucilieri dell'Aria - Air Force Fusiliers Battalion)
- (Italy) 17º Stormo Incursori (17th Raiders Wing)
- (Japan) Base Defense Development & Training Squadron
- (Malaysia) Royal Malaysian Air Force Regiment
  - (Malaysia) RMAF Ground Defence Force
  - (Malaysia) RMAF Special Forces
- (Montenegro) Montenegrin Air Force Air Base Security Platoon
- (New Zealand) RNZAF Security Forces
- (Netherlands) Luchtvaarttroepen
- (Nigeria) Nigerian Air Force Regiment
- (Norway) Royal Norwegian Air Force Base Defense Squadron
- (Pakistan) Special Service Wing
- (Philippines) 710th Special Operations Wing
- (Poland) JW GROM
- (Poland) JW Komandosów
- (Portugal) Polícia Aérea
- (South Korea) 6th Search & Rescue Air Group
- (South Korea) Combat Control Team
- (South Korea) Air Force Military Police Agency
- (Spain) Escuadrón de Zapadores Paracaidistas (EZAPAC)
- (Spain) Escuadrón de Apoyo al Despliegue Aéreo (EADA)
- (Spain) Segundo Escuadrón de Apoyo al Despliegue Aéreo (SEADA)
- Sri Lanka Air Force Regiment
- (Switzerland) Parachute Reconnaissance Company 17
- (Sweden) Swedish Air Force Rangers
- (Sweden) Swedish Air Force Force Protection (Flygbassäk)
- (Thailand) Royal Thai Air Force Security Force Command
  - (Thailand) RTAF Special Operations Regiment
- (Turkey) Combat Search and Rescue (Turkish Armed Forces)
- (United Kingdom) RAF Regiment
- (United Kingdom) RAF Police
- (Ukraine) 1st Air Force Combined Rifles Brigade
- United States Air Force Security Forces
  - (United States) 820th Base Defense Group
- United States Air Force Special Warfare
  - (United States) Combat Control Team
  - (United States) Pararescue
  - (United States) Tactical Air Control Party
  - (United States) Special Reconnissance
- (Venezuela) Venezuelan Air Force Commandos (Grupos de Operaciones Especiales Aeroes)

=== Historic/Defunct ===
- (Nazi Germany) Fallschirmjäger
- (Nazi Germany) 1st Fallschirm-Panzer Division Hermann Göring
- (Nazi Germany) Luftwaffe Field Divisions
- (United Kingdom) Royal Air Force Commandos
- (Kingdom of Italy) Arditi distruttori della Regia Aeronautica
- (Portugal) Caçadores Paraquedistas
- (Taiwan) Air Force Air Defense Artillery and Security Guards Command
- (South Korea) Unit 684
- (Australia) No. 3 Security Forces Squadron RAAF

== See also ==
- List of military special forces units
- List of paratrooper forces
- Marines
