= Malaysian Special Forces Selection =

Special operations selection and assessment programme in Malaysia

The Special Forces Selection is the recruitment, selection, and training process for candidates of the Special forces units in Malaysia. This selection process is not limited only to the special forces of the Malaysian Armed Forces but also includes the Royal Malaysian Police, the Malaysian Coast Guard, and the Johor Military Forces, which is a private army of the state of Johor. Currently, there are four training centres, also known as commando schools, and one non-commando school in Malaysia that conduct special forces selection.

In contrast to the United Kingdom Special Forces Selection, which originally had separate selections before being merged in the late 1990s, the Malaysian Armed Forces Special Forces Selection started as one before the Royal Malaysian Navy and Royal Malaysian Air Force initiated their own special forces selection processes in the mid-1980s.

The Malaysian Army, which has the largest special forces among other service branches, conducts the selection process three times a year.

The Malaysian Special Forces Selection typically involves two courses before candidates graduate from the selection and are awarded the beret according to their units and a combat knife. Depending on their commando school, graduates may also be awarded a special forces lanyard and insignia.

== History ==
=== Origin: Special Operations Executive ===
Years prior to the independence of Malaya from the United Kingdom in 1957 and the formation of Malaysia in 1963, during World War II, the region now known as Malaysia witnessed the introduction of modern special forces. Force 136, the Far East branch of the Special Operations Executive (SOE), established a forward operating base in Kuala Kangsar, Perak. Citizens from various regions, including British Malaya, the Raj of Sarawak, North Borneo, and Southern Siam, such as Chin Phui Kong, Ibrahim Ismail, and Tunku Osman, underwent special forces training at the British Commando School under SOE.

The principles and expertise acquired during that training period continue to influence and shape the development of special forces in Malaysia today.

=== Pre-independence ===
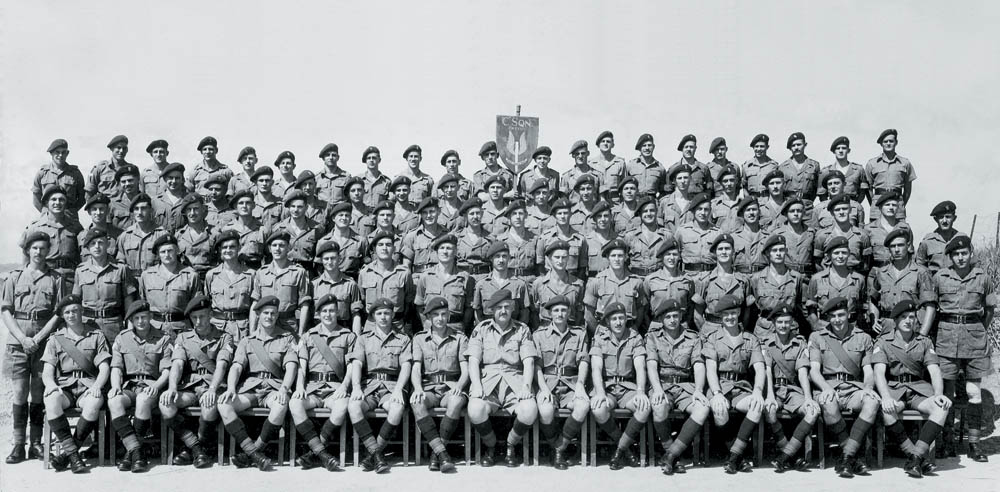
C Squadron (Rhodesian) of the Malayan Scouts during the Malayan Emergency in 1953. SAS troopers used maroon berets during this period.

Following the conclusion of World War II, Malaya and Borneo found themselves embroiled in a new conflict against communism. The Malayan Emergency, which commenced in 1948, posed a challenge for the Malayan British Military Administration (BMA) due to the guerrilla tactics employed by the enemy, who had received training from Force 136 during World War II. (Note: The communist guerrillas collaborated with the United Kingdom during World War II. Force 136 agents were sent to train the guerrillas in guerrilla warfare. Alongside other resistance groups, including the communist guerrillas, Force 136 fought against and sabotaged the Japanese Imperial Army in Malaya throughout the war.) The existing military and police forces in Malaya, being versed in conventional warfare, struggled to make headway against the communist armed forces.

To address this issue, the BMA formed a unit known as the Ferret Force, comprising former Force 136 agents and local volunteers from the military and police forces. Colonel John Davis led this unit. As the situation continued to deteriorate, General Sir John Harding, the commander-in-chief of the Far East Land Forces, enlisted the expertise of Major Mike "Mad Mike" Calvert. Major Calvert, a former Chindits and Force 136 agent with experience in Burma, was tasked with assessing the situation in Malaya.

In 1950, Major Calvert established a special forces unit called the Malayan Scouts. Subsequently, Ferret Force was reorganised and became A Squadron, Malayan Scouts. The Malayan Scouts underwent another transformation in 1958 when they were renamed the 22 Special Air Service.

=== Malaysian Special Service Unit ===
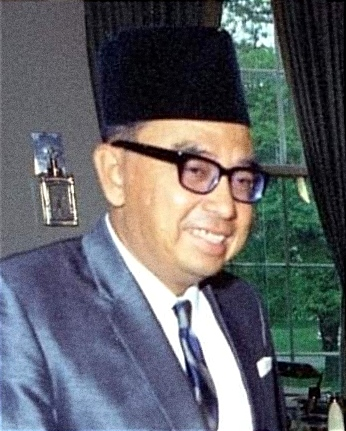
During his tenure as the Minister of Defence, Abdul Razak, Malaysia's 2nd Prime Minister, suggested the formation of a special operations unit. Force 136, which trained him as a guerrilla resistance fighter during World War II, had him serve as a spy for the British within the Japanese-occupied Malaya government.

The Indonesia-Malaysia confrontation began in 1963 when Indonesia, then under a pro-communist government, attacked Malaysia. (Note: The president of Indonesia during that period was Sukarno, a leftist and follower of Marxism. His government enjoyed support from the Communist Party of Indonesia, and he sought to unify the Nationalist, Religious, and Communist factions into one entity, proposing the concept of NASAKOM, an abbreviation for the Indonesian words "Nasionalis Agama Komunis". Sukarno initiated an anti-Malaysia campaign called "Ganyang Malaysia" and deployed military forces with the aim of conquering Malaysia.) At that time, Malaysia, having recently formed, had a small military force and relied on military assistance from the Commonwealth Nations. In early 1965, Abdul Razak Hussein, the Minister of Defence at the time, instructed the Malaysian Armed Forces (MAF) to establish an experimental special forces unit by recruiting members from various branches within the MAF. General Tunku Osman, the Chief of Defence Forces at that time and a former Force 136 agent, desired that the task force be trained as commandos, similar to his own experiences during World War II. (Note: During World War II, British commandos differed significantly from today's British commandos affiliated with the Royal Marines Commando and the 3 Commando Brigade. Current commandos primarily serve as light infantry units. It's only with the recent establishment of the Future Commando Force that Royal Marines commandos have been retrained to function as special operations-capable units. In contrast, the World War II British commandos constituted a special forces unit, incorporating elite groups like the Special Air Service (SAS), the Special Boat Service (SBS), the Special Operations Executive (SOE), and others.) Seeking assistance, the Malaysian Armed Forces approached 40 Commando, based in Singapore at the time, to conduct the selection process and provide training for the task force. Initially named the Malaysian Special Service Unit, it later became known as Gerak Khas in Malay.

=== Police's special operations task force ===
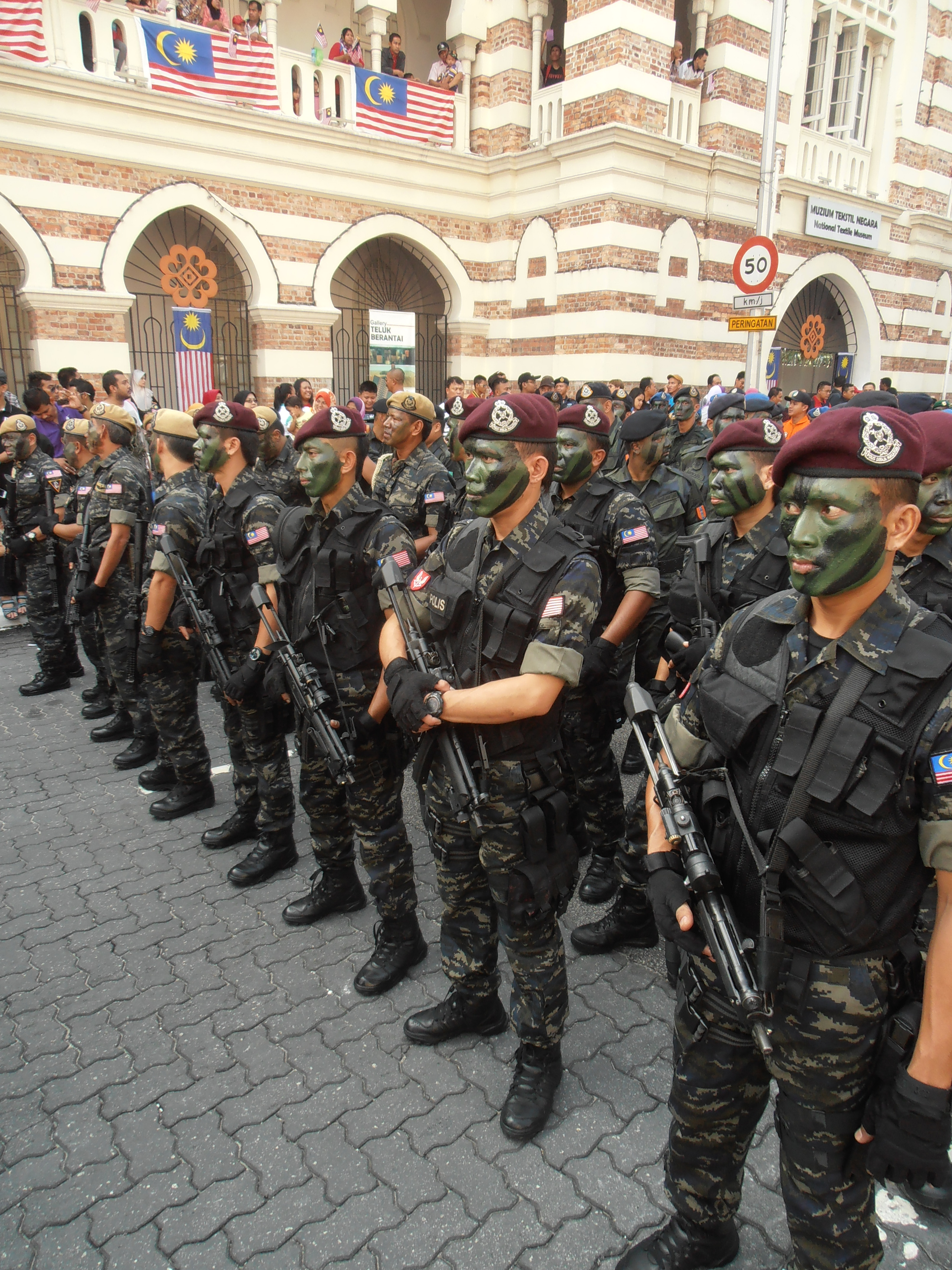
Special forces operators from units under the RMP Special Operations Command during the 56th Merdeka Day. Those on the left, donning sand-coloured berets, are operators from VAT 69 Commando, while those on the right, with Bordeaux maroon berets, are operators from the Special Action Unit.

The Indonesia-Malaysia confrontation officially ended in 1966, but Malaysia faced a second communist armed conflict that began in 1968. On 13 May 1969, racial riots erupted in major cities in Malaysia, resulting in several casualties. In response to the incident's racial tensions, the Special Branch, the police intelligence unit, collaborated with the Malaysian Special Service Unit to apprehend leaders of gangsters and triads who played a role behind the scenes.

Recognising the need for special forces within the Royal Malaysian Police (RMP), the RMP established a special forces task force in 1969, with the first selection process taking place in October of that year. The task force went by various names, such as Task Force, Charlie Force, and Special Project Team. Over time, the task force evolved into a permanent police unit and officially adopted the name Pasukan Polis Hutan 69, translated as Police Field Force 69, or Jungle Squad 69 in English. It was placed under the Police Field Force, now known as the General Operations Force. Presently, the squad is known as 69 Commando, or VAT 69 for short.

=== Malaysian SWAT ===
In response to the growing presence of communism, the emergence of gangster groups, and triads in major cities, especially Kuala Lumpur, during the 1970s, the RMP establishing a police tactical unit on 1 January 1975. This unit, named the Special Actions Unit, underwent specialised training to carry out counterterrorism operations, covert missions, and to serve as an assault team for the RMP in urban areas. To enhance their capabilities, counterterrorism instructors from the 22 Special Air Service were brought to Malaysia to train the Special Actions Unit in counterterrorism tactics, building raids, and sniper operations. On 20 October 1997, the RMP amalgamated the VAT 69 Commando and the Special Actions Unit, establishing a unified special operations command. Consequently, these two units are recognised as the true special forces within the RMP. (Note: Other police tactical units exist within the RMP besides these two. For example, UNGERIN, the marine police tactical unit of the Marine Operations Force. However, only the Special Actions Unit and 69 Commando are under the RMP's special operations command.)

=== Special Warfare Training Centre ===
Due to the ongoing armed conflict with communists, which showed no signs of near resolution, and with the aim of saving costs associated with sending military personnel overseas for special operations training, the Malaysian Armed Forces (MAF) established the Special Warfare Training Centre (SWTC) on 1 August 1976, at Sungai Udang Camp in Malacca. The training centre was placed under the management of the Malaysian Army. During this period, the Royal Malaysian Navy (RMN) and the Royal Malaysian Air Force (RMAF) still lacked their own special forces. Officers, sailors, or airmen from these branches could volunteer for Gerak Khas selection to become a special forces soldier, commonly referred to today as an 'operator'. Even after the RMN and RMAF established their own special forces in 1977 and 1980, the SWTC remained the sole commando school conducting special forces selection for the entire MAF.

== Commando schools ==
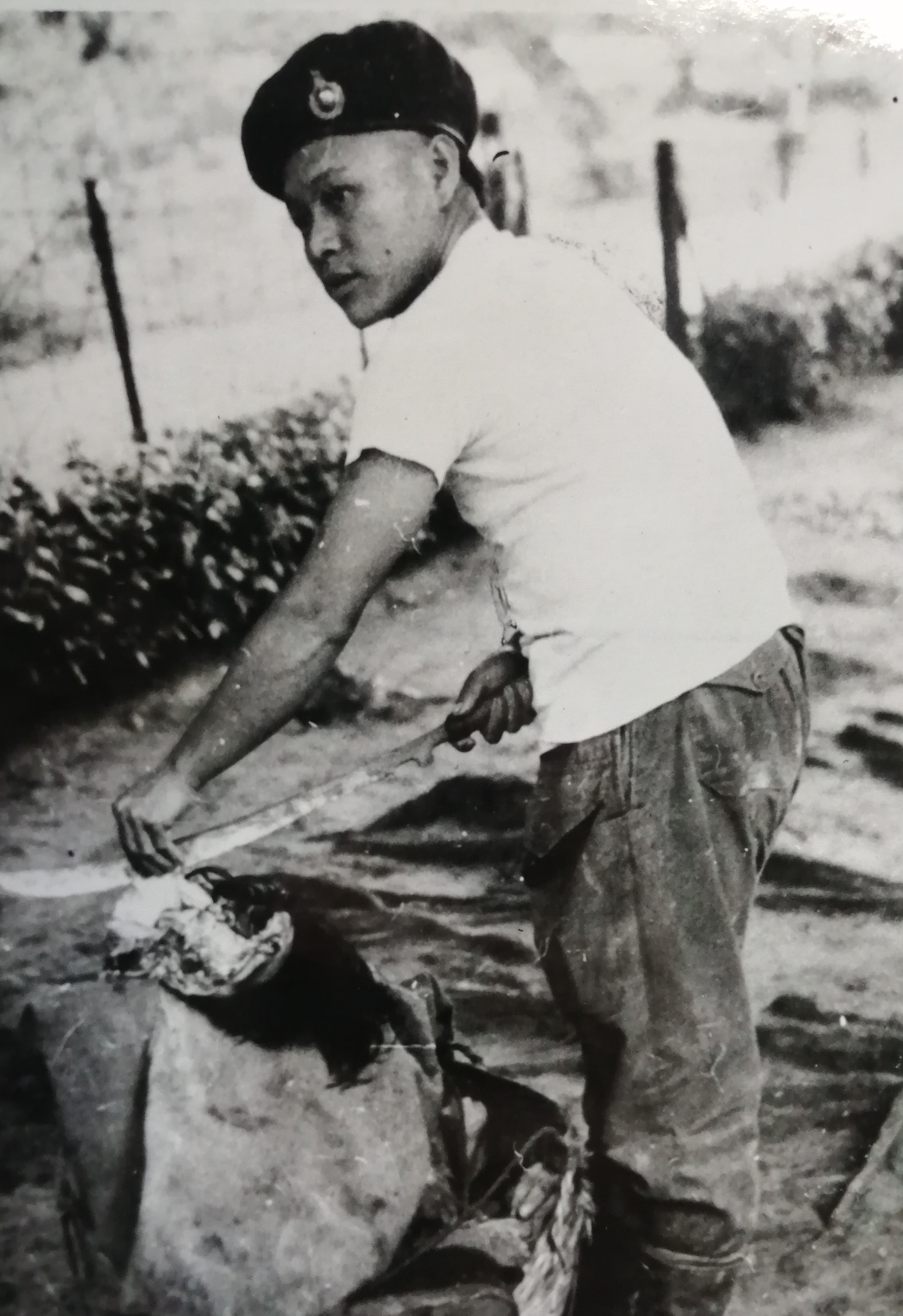
An Iban tracker from the Sarawak Rangers during the Malayan Emergency. It's noteworthy that he is wearing the green beret of the Royal Marines, indicating his qualification as a commando.

The term Commando School is used for training centres that offer selection courses, officially known as Basic Commando Courses (Malay: Kursus Asas Komando), for Special Forces in Malaysia. The term 'Commando' in Malaysia is used to signify the ability of a unit or individual trained in small unit tactics, guerrilla warfare, and jungle warfare mastery. Although in the present day, the term 'Commando' is highly associated with special forces units in Malaysia, the status of 'commando' was not exclusive to special forces in the past.

For example, during the Malayan Emergency, the British conferred the status of 'Commando' upon the Senoi Praqq, a manhunt and tracker unit that functioned as an auxiliary team for the Special Air Service, and the Sarawak Rangers, a manhunt and tracker unit embedded with the Royal Marines Commando. Likewise, in 1972, amid the Communist insurgency in Malaysia (1968–1989), the Malaysian government granted the 'Commando' status to the Tiger Platoon of the 9 RAMD, a long-range reconnaissance patrol.

The four commando schools are:

=== Special Warfare Training Centre ===
The Special Warfare Training Centre (SWTC), located at Sungai Udang Camp in Malacca, is the oldest special operations training centre in Malaysia. Established on 1 August 1976, as the Malaysian Armed Forces Special Warfare Training Centre (Malay: Pusat Latihan Peperangan Khas Angkatan Tentera Malaysia), this school operates under the administration of the Malaysian Army Training and Doctrine Command. One of the objectives of the establishment of SWTC is to conduct Basic Commando Courses, taking over from the 1st Malaysian Special Service Regiment, so they can focus on functioning as a combat unit.

In the past, the Basic Commando Course at the SWTC served as the primary special forces selection for all branches of the Malaysian Armed Forces. However, in 1985, the Royal Malaysian Navy initiated its own Special Forces Selection at Lumut Naval Base, leading to SWTC undergoing a transformation and changing its name to the Malaysian Army Special Warfare Training Centre.

=== RMAF Combat Training School ===
Established on 1 March 2018, the RMAF Combat Training School, or Sekolah Latihan Tempur TUDM in Malay, is located at RMAF Bukit Ibam Air Base in Pahang. Operating under the Royal Malaysian Air Force (RMAF), the school has offered the Basic Commando Course since its inception. Before the school's establishment, the RMAF conducted its own Basic Commando Course since the late 1993 at various locations, including the Air Force Academy, RMAF Jugra Air Base in Selangor, and RMAF Kuantan Air Base in Pahang.

=== KD Panglima Garang ===
Established on 1 October 2021, KD Panglima Garang is a Royal Malaysian Navy (RMN) shore establishment located inside RMN Lumut Naval Base in Perak. Also known as the Naval Special Forces Training Centre, it boasts various facilities, including a mock oil platform for Naval Special Forces (PASKAL) training. Despite the recent establishment of the RMN's special operations training centre, RMN has conducted its own Basic Commando Course since 1985 at RMN Lumut Naval Base, sharing training facilities with other RMN units.

=== 69 Commando Training Centre ===
The 69 Commando Training Centre (Malay: Pusat Latihan 69 Komando) is the dedicated special operations training facility of the Royal Malaysia Police (RMP). Officially opened in May 2024, the centre is managed by the Special Warfare Training Branch of 69 Commando (Malay: Cawangan Latihan Peperangan Khas (CLPK) 69 Komando). It oversees all selection, basic commando course and advanced training stages, serving not only the RMP's tactical units but also personnel from the Malaysian Armed Forces and other government agencies.

The majority of the centre's infrastructure is located within Camp Sultan Nazrin Shah, the 69 Commando headquarters in Ulu Kinta, Perak. Additionally, the unit maintains a specialised jungle warfare facility known as the 69 Commando Outdoor Training Camp (Malay: Markas Kem Latihan Luar 69 Komando) situated in Terong, Perak.

The establishment of this centre represents a significant transition from the unit's previous reliance on shared facilities. Since 1978, 69 Commando had conducted its basic commando course within the General Operations Force (GOF) Northern Brigade garrison in Ulu Kinta. The transition to a dedicated headquarters and training centre allows for greater autonomy and the expansion of specialised training programmes.

== Other special forces training centre ==
Operating primarily in urban environments, the Special Actions Unit is distinct from commando units. Consequently, its special forces selection process differs from that of other special forces units in Malaysia.

=== Special Actions Unit Training Centre ===
The Pusat Latihan Unit Tindakhas, or Special Actions Unit Training Centre in English, is a special forces training centre under the Royal Malaysian Police and is currently in the construction phase. It is located inside the 4th Battalion of the General Operations Force's garrison at Semenyih in Selangor. Since its formation in 1975, the Special Actions Unit has relied on various locations for its selection process, including the GOF Northern Brigade, the 6th Battalion GOF camp in Bakri, Muar, PULAPOL facilities, and Bukit Aman.

== Special forces selection (Commando) ==
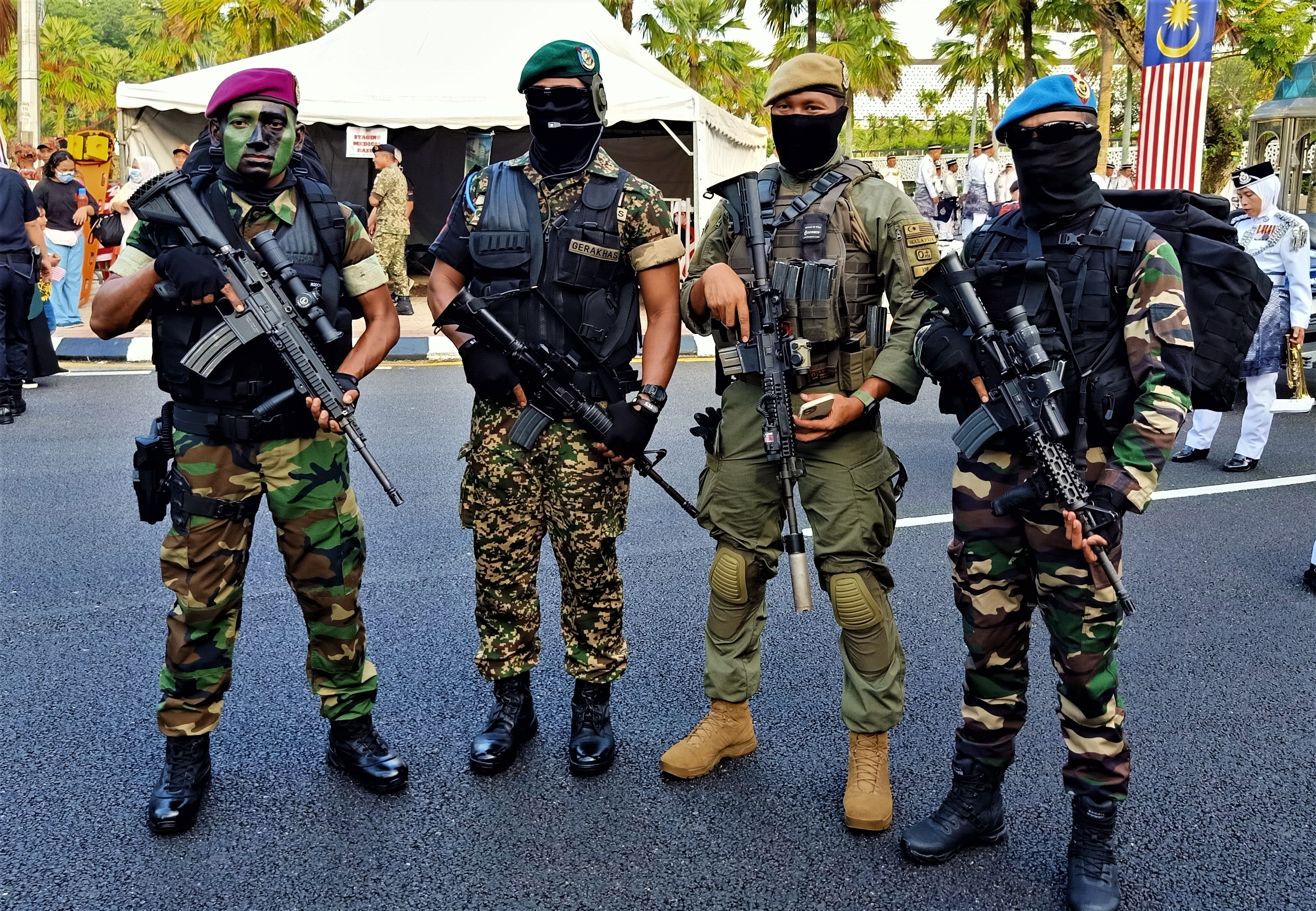
Commandos from four different units during the 65th Merdeka Day: from left, a commando from PASKAL, a commando from 21 SSG, a commando from VAT 69, and a commando from PASKAU.

Aspiring individuals must follow this pipeline to serve in the following units, all conducted at Commando schools:

- 21st Special Service Group (21 SSG)
- Naval Special Forces (PASKAL)
- RMAF Special Forces (PASKAU)
- 69 Commando (VAT 69)
- Coast Guard Special Task and Rescue (STAR) (Note: The Malaysian Coast Guard's Special Task and Rescue Team consists of two components: Special Operations and Rescue Swimmer. Only those in special operations are required to undergo special forces selection.)
- 91st Intelligence Operations Group (91 IOG) (Note: The 91 IOG is not part of the 21st Special Service Group, the Special Operations Command for the Malaysian Army. Instead, it serves as the special forces for the Royal Intelligence Corps, and its members undergo training at Commando School, similar to other special forces units.)
- JMF Elite Unit

=== Pipelines comparison ===
Comparison of the Special Forces (Commando) Training Pipelines
	21 SSG	PASKAL	PASKAU	VAT 69	STAR Team	91 IOG	JMF Elite Unit
Preparation/ Initial training	Preparatory course (4 weeks)	Preparatory course (4 weeks)	Preparatory course (4 weeks)	Not applicable	Screening Test (1 week)	Preparatory course (4 weeks)	Preparatory course (4 weeks)
Introduction	Not applicable	Pre-Basic Commando Course (2 weeks)	Not applicable	Pre-Basic Commando Course (2 weeks)	Pre-Basic Commando Course (2 weeks)	Not applicable	Not applicable
Water Competency Course	Not applicable	Water Competency Training (4 weeks)	Not applicable	Not applicable	Not applicable	Not applicable	Not applicable
Basic Commando Course (Note: While standard basic commando courses in Malaysia typically span twelve weeks, the VAT 69 basic commando course extends to twenty weeks, and the STAR Team basic commando course is conducted over a sixteen-week programme.)	Phase 1: Camp (5 weeks)	Phase 1: Camp (5 weeks)	Module 1: Camp (5 weeks)	Phase 1: Built-up areas, jungle, swamp and sea	Phase 1: Physical and mental fortitude module	Phase 1: Camp (5 weeks)	Phase 1: Camp (5 weeks)
Basic Commando Course	Phase 2: Jungle (2 weeks)	Phase 2: Jungle (2 weeks)	Module 2: Long Distance March (3 days)	Phase 1: Built-up areas, jungle, swamp and sea	Phase 1: Physical and mental fortitude module	Phase 2: Jungle (2 weeks)	Phase 2: Jungle (2 weeks)
Basic Commando Course	Phase 3: Swamp & Long Distance March (10 days)	Phase 3: Swamp & Long Distance March (10 days)	Module 3: Jungle (2 weeks)	Phase 2: Small unit patrol and weapon training	Phase 2: Survival, Evasion, Resistance and Escape (SERE)	Phase 3: Swamp & Long Distance March (10 days)	Phase 3: Swamp & Long Distance March (10 days)
Basic Commando Course	Phase 4: Sea (2 weeks)	Phase 4: Sea (2 weeks)	Module 4: Sea	Phase 2: Small unit patrol and weapon training	Phase 2: Survival, Evasion, Resistance and Escape (SERE)	Phase 4: Sea (2 weeks)	Phase 4: Sea (2 weeks)
Basic Commando Course	Phase 4: Sea (2 weeks)	Phase 4: Sea (2 weeks)	Module 5: Dark Water	Phase 3: Practical & Evaluation	Phase 3: Basic Specialisation Phase	Phase 4: Sea (2 weeks)	Phase 4: Sea (2 weeks)
Basic Commando Course	Phase 5: Escape and Evasion (2 weeks)	Phase 5: Escape and Evasion (2 weeks)	Module 6: Escape and Evasion (2 weeks)	Phase 3: Practical & Evaluation	Phase 3: Basic Specialisation Phase	Phase 5: Escape and Evasion (2 weeks)	Phase 5: Escape and Evasion (2 weeks)
Compulsory advanced training	Not applicable	Not applicable	Not applicable	Not applicable	Not applicable	Not applicable	Special Forces Specialist Course
Continuation training

== Preparatory course ==
This course is known by various names, including 'Warm-up for the Basic Commando Course (Malay: Pemanasan Kursus Asas Komando)', 'STAR Pre-Basic Commando Course (Malay: Kursus Pra Asas Komando STAR)', 'PASKAL Warm-up Stage (Malay: Peringkat Pemanasan PASKAL)', and several others. Regardless of its name, this four-week course aims to physically and mentally prepare candidates for upcoming phases in their special forces pipeline. It maintains a less strict atmosphere, occasionally allowing candidates permission to leave the camp on weekends.

Throughout this course, candidates are instructed on optimal techniques for physical training to minimise the risk of injuries during the basic commando course. They also receive training in swimming fundamentals, and a crucial component is the requirement to pass a physical test at the course's conclusion. Examples of the final tests include:

- Running 6.8 kilometres (4.2 mi) in under 30 minutes
- Swimming 500 metres (1,600 ft) in a pool within 10 minutes
- Sidestroke swimming for 500 metres (1,600 ft) within 12 minutes
- Mixed-style swimming for 500 metres (1,600 ft) within 12 minutes

Since August 2025, the Malaysian Coast Guard has conducted its own independent special forces selection process. Consequently, candidates from the Coast Guard are no longer required to complete the STAR Pre-Basic Commando Course. Under the new system, applicants must successfully navigate two stages of screening: the Selection and Pre-Assessment Course (Kursus Pemilihan dan Pra-Penilaian), followed by the Final Screening Test (Saringan Akhir).

== Pre-Basic Commando Course ==
The objective of this two-week phase is to familiarise sailors, whether from the navy or coast guard, as well as policemen, with infantry skills, small unit tactics and jungle warfare. This is crucial because, unlike the Malaysian Army or Royal Malaysian Air Force, which recruits potential commandos from infantry and air force infantry units, the navy, coast guard, and police do not undergo similar training. For instance, naval and coast guard officers and sailors have their own distinctive naval ratings when in their original units. Similarly, policemen primarily focus on law enforcement duties in their original units. In this course, they receive a crash course on what to expect if they become special forces operators. When compared to the United Kingdom Special Forces Selection, this course is equivalent to the SAS Infantry Skills Course, which is optional only for candidates not from infantry units.

== Water Competency Training ==
Designed specifically for special forces involved in maritime operations, this rigorous four-week programme focuses on physical conditioning and water competency testing. Similar to the requirements for U.S. Navy SEALs and SWCC candidates, successful completion is mandatory. This programme is not exclusive to special forces; candidates from other maritime specialised units, such as Navy Clearance Divers and Coast Guard Rescue Divers, also participate alongside them. In the final week, they need to pass the following tests:

- Fitness Test (Land):
  - 6.8 kilometres (4.2 mi) run in under 34 minutes
  - 50 push-ups in 90 seconds
  - 50 sit-ups under 90 seconds
  - 15 metres (49 ft) of rope climbing, and more
- Fitness Test (Water):
  - 500 metres (550 yd) of freestyle swimming in under 10 minutes
  - 500 metres (550 yd) of sidestroke swimming in under 12 minutes
  - 500 metres (550 yd) of mixed-style swimming in under 12 minutes
  - 7 metres (23 ft) dive to the pool's bottom
  - 35 metres (115 ft) of diving across the pool under one breath
  - Diving from a 10 metres (33 ft) platform
- 'Drown-proofing' Test: All with arms and legs tied
  - 75 metres (246 ft) swim across
  - 15-minute float in the pool
  - 5 metres (16 ft) of diving to the pool bottom

Since August 2025, the Malaysian Coast Guard has operated an independent special forces selection process featuring a specialised training module. Under this new pipeline, Water Competency Training is no longer conducted as a separate stage; instead, it has been integrated into the first phase of the basic commando course, known as the Self-identity module.

== Basic Commando Course (Military) ==
The Malaysian Armed Forces conduct the Basic Commando Course, known as Kursus Asas Komando in Malay, over 12 weeks, making it the most challenging course. The course runs for 12 consecutive weeks without any rest days between phases. On average, candidates get approximately 3 hours of sleep per night from the beginning to the end of the course.

Despite its name incorporating the term 'Commando', this course is comparable to the condensed version of the pre-2000 United Kingdom Special Forces Selection, which lasted 15 weeks. The term 'Commando' originates from the World War II British Commando. This course differs from the post-2003 United Kingdom Special Forces Selection, where the updated programme extends to 26 weeks after the inclusion of various special operations techniques. (Note: Special operations skills cover various courses such as surveillance and reconnaissance, survival, parachutist training, counter terrorism, signals, and weapon training.)

40 Commando supervised the Basic Commando Course in 1965, which initially spanned 12 weeks before extending to 24 weeks, following the establishment of the 1st Malaysian Special Service Regiment (now known as the 21st Commando Regiment) in 1970. However, in the 1980s, the course was streamlined back to its current 12-week duration. All special forces, except those from the Royal Malaysian Police, attend the course at all commando schools within the Malaysian Armed Forces.

While all courses generally follow the same curriculum and phases, the Royal Malaysian Air Force Basic Commando Course differs in its designation of phases as modules. Additionally, they separate the sea phase into the 'Sea Module' and the 'Dark Water Module'. The phases include:

=== Camp Phase (5 weeks) ===
Organised over five weeks, this phase stands as the crucial level for testing and enhancing candidates' physical and mental resilience. Candidates undergo constant physical endurance and exercise, engaging in theories and practical applications of weapon handling, explosives handling, tactics and stratagem implementation, field medical procedures, rappelling and abseiling, as well as honing map-reading skills. At the end of each week, candidates are required to undergo several series of loaded marches, with distances progressively increasing from 4.8 kilometres (3.0 mi), 8 kilometres (5.0 mi), 11.2 kilometres (7.0 mi), 14 kilometres (8.7 mi), and 16 kilometres (9.9 mi).

If they fail to reach the end under the specified time limits, the instructors withdraw them from the Basic Commando Course.

=== Jungle Phase (2 weeks) ===
This two-week jungle training is a favourite among the candidates. It provides exposure to practical training and field skills, including guarding and patrolling, establishing bases, survival techniques, and small unit tactics (section/troop) combat. For instance, candidates learn about poisonous and edible plants, trap-setting, and identifying drinkable water sources from plants.

=== Swamp Phase and Long Range March (10 days) ===
During this phase, all candidates endure a challenging combat-loaded march carrying a 17 kilograms (37 lb) load, aiming to reach the target 160 kilometres (99 mi) away within three days. Those who succeed in this march proceed to spend seven days in a swampy area without access to food supplies or proper clothing. They are provided only with their underwear and rifle, and they are required to share a machete. This phase serves as a practical application of all survival lessons taught in previous phases.

=== Sea Phase (2 weeks) ===
The sea training spans two weeks, during which candidates engage in practical exercises involving small craft marine navigation, long-range silent rowing, and beach raids using rigid-hulled inflatable boats (RIB), rigid raider craft, and kayaks. Upon completion of the training, they undertake a 160 kilometres (99 mi) journey along the Straits of Malacca using rigid raider craft, conducted under the cover of night to simulate infiltration into the objective area by sea.

For the Royal Malaysian Air Force Basic Commando Course, this phase is split into two modules known as the 'Sea Module' and the 'Dark Water Module'.

=== Escape and Evasion Phase (2 weeks) ===
This phase exposes candidates to real special forces operations, requiring them to apply all they have learned and endured in the previous phases. Candidates are deployed in groups, tasked with infiltrating 100 kilometres (62 mi) into the operation area by rowing RIB. In the operation area, candidates must locate and identify the enemy and their assets before planning, organising, and launching a raid in the enemy's territory. Once they achieve their objective, they need to escape and report to several agents at designated checkpoints. They must know how to contact their agents and evade instructors acting as enemies who control that area. If caught, candidates will be tortured and abused. Captured candidates will be marked and released to continue their journey until they reach the last checkpoint. Candidates can be caught more than once. The total distance candidates cover during their escape is almost 240 kilometres (150 mi), and they must cover this distance within 5 days.

== Basic Commando Course (Royal Malaysian Police) ==
Known as Kursus Asas Komando 69 in Malay or Basic 69 Commando Course in English, this course spans 20 weeks. It is conducted twice a year and currently takes place at the General Operations Force's (GOF) Northern Brigade's garrison and the Commando 69 Outdoor Training Camp Headquarters while awaiting the completion of the Pusat Latihan Unit Komando 69 Pasukan Gerak Khas.

Originally, VAT 69 candidates underwent a similar Basic Commando Course as the military, lasting for 12 weeks. However, due to a low number of police personnel passing the course, in January 2019, the then-Commander of VAT 69, SAC Abdul Razak Mohd Yusoff SP, aimed to adjust VAT 69's selection program. This adjustment aimed to allow for more graduates to fill the larger spots left by retired and departing commandos.

According to Abdul Razak, as mentioned in an interview with Utusan Malaysia, at that time, the lowest number of policemen graduating from the basic commando course was only 9 graduates from hundreds of initial applications, while they needed to fill around 80 spots every year left by retired and departing commandos. To address this issue, VAT 69 restructured their selection process, incorporating additional special operations skills such as small unit tactics, special operations marksmanship, and demolition techniques. As a result, their Basic Commando Course, starting in July 2019, was extended to 20 weeks. Since the adjustment to the selection process in 2019, the number of graduates from the Basic 69 Commando Course has approached 30.

The Royal Malaysian Police implemented the following new components for the Basic Commando Course:

=== First Phase ===
During the initial phase, candidates undergo training in four distinct environments. The first part takes place at the camp within the General Operations Force's (GOF) Northern Brigade's garrison. Here, candidates delve into theoretical aspects related to special operations, including map reading, infiltration, and survival techniques. Subsequently, candidates transition to the jungle environment before proceeding to the swamp area and sea.

=== Second Phase ===
In the second phase, candidates receive instruction on operating as small units. They must master jungle warfare, guerrilla warfare, weaponry, explosives, manhunt, communication, and field medical skills. Additionally, candidates learn how to create booby traps, handle explosives, and employ various demolition techniques.

=== Third Phase ===
The final phase, known as the Final Mission Execution phase, subjects candidates to comprehensive testing across all the skills and lessons acquired in the preceding phases. This phase is similar to the Escape and Evasion Phase from the Military Basic Commando Course.

== Basic Special Actions Unit Course ==
The Special Actions Unit's selection process is similar to that of other special forces in Malaysia. Candidates must undergo a preparatory course and a main selection course before being bestowed with the Bordeaux-coloured beret. (Note: The Special Actions Unit's beret is in a Bordeaux shade of maroon. This colour is chosen to reflect their roots with the British Air Service, which used a maroon beret during the Malayan Emergency, combined with the blue colour of the police.) Although the Special Actions Unit received training from the British Special Air Services during its establishment in 1975, it is the only Special Forces unit in Malaysia not considered to have 'Commando' status due to their focus on urban operations rather than jungle environments like other special forces.

The main selection course for the Special Actions Unit, officially known as Kursus Asas UTK in Malay and Basic Special Actions Unit Course in English, lasts for 13 weeks and is divided into three stages:

=== First stage ===
The first stage, also known as the camp phase, is conducted at the Malaysian Police Training Centre. Candidates undergo rigorous physical exercises while simultaneously learning theory about weapon handling and marksmanship, basic rope training, basic first aid, unarmed combat, and basic close-quarters combat.

=== Second stage ===
The second stage, also known as the Jungle Phase, typically takes place at the 6th Battalion of the General Operations Force's garrison located in Bakri, Johor. Candidates engage in challenging physical exercises while learning jungle survival theory before implementing the practical aspects in nearby jungles. Despite the Special Actions Unit's specialisation not being in jungle warfare, candidates must understand how to operate in jungle environments, as they may need to conduct raids on locations situated at the jungle's edge near major cities.

=== Third stage ===
In this final stage, conducted at Bukit Aman in Kuala Lumpur, candidates undergo strenuous physical exercises while receiving extensive training on raiding and body guarding. They are taught theory on raiding cars, buildings, buses, trains, and aeroplanes in classes before executing the raid exercises at locations such as Malayan Railways' locomotive depot, and Kuala Lumpur International Airport.

== Basic Commando Course (Malaysia Coast Guard) ==
In 2025, the Malaysia Coast Guard conducted its inaugural independent special forces selection, officially designated as the Basic Commando Course – STAR Team. This programme is specifically tailored to the operational requirements of the Special Tasks and Rescue (STAR) Team, drawing directly from their maritime security experiences.

The 16-week curriculum represents a strategic consolidation of several previously separate training modules. It integrates the 12-week Malaysian Armed Forces Basic Commando Course with a four-week Water Competency programme and the six-week Special Task Introduction Course. Previously, the latter was a mandatory advanced training phase for graduates before they were permitted to wear the scarlet red beret; it is now fully incorporated into the initial selection pipeline.

The course is currently conducted at the Sultan Ahmad Shah Coast Guard Academy (AMSAS) in Kuantan, Pahang, utilising shared facilities with the Coast Guard Diving School and other departmental infrastructure. This arrangement serves as an interim measure while the construction of a dedicated special forces training centre in Kemaman, Terengganu is finalised. Upon completion, the Kemaman facility will serve as the permanent hub for STAR Team training and selection. The training is structured into three distinct phases:

=== Phase 1: Physical and Mental Fortitude ===
This phase is designed to cultivate the specific mindset required of a special operations operative. Candidates are introduced to technical modules while simultaneously undergoing rigorous physical conditioning to test their limits. The training focuses on developing physical strength, bravery, leadership, and camaraderie. Those who fail to meet the standards are withdrawn from the course, while successful candidates proceed to the next stage. Key challenges include:

- Self-identity module (Modul Jati Diri): Psychological and character development.
- 160 kilometres (99 mi) Long Range March
- Water and Land Competency Training
- Specialised Phobia Testing: Assessments involving heights and confined spaces.

=== Phase 2: Survival, Evasion, Resistance, and Escape (SERE) ===
This phase provides candidates with the essential skills required to survive in hostile or isolated conditions across diverse environments. Trainees undergo intensive modules in swamp, jungle, and maritime settings. The phase culminates in a comprehensive SERE exercise where candidates must apply their knowledge of survival and evasion under tactical pressure.

=== Phase 3: Basic Specialisation ===
The final phase, also known as Fasa Asas Kepakaran in Malay, introduces candidates to the core operational roles and tactical duties of the STAR Team. Trainees are taught basic proficiency in a wide range of specialised modules, including:

- Close Quarter Battle (CQB) and Special Demolition
- Visit, Board, Search, and Seizure (VBSS)
- Sniper operations and Sabotage
- Intelligence gathering and Combat Rescue
- Dignitary protection (Bodyguarding)

Candidates who successfully navigate this final assessment proceed to the formal graduation ceremony to be officially inducted into the STAR Team.

== Graduation ==
Upon the successful completion of the Basic Commando Course or the Basic Special Actions Unit Course, candidates must perform a final practical demonstration. This display is conducted for an audience of VIPs, instructors, visitors, and the families of the trainees. The specific nature of the demonstration is determined by the traditions and operational focus of the respective training school.

Following the demonstration, candidates proceed to a formal graduation ceremony. At this event, they are awarded the distinctive beret of their unit, along with other accessories which may include a lanyard, a special operations insignia or a combat knife. The JMF Elite Forces are unique in that they undergo two separate graduation ceremonies: the first occurs upon completion of the basic commando phase at a special warfare school, and the second follows the conclusion of their compulsory advanced training.

Schools	Services	Final practical demonstration	Beret	Combat knife	Lanyard	Special operations insignia
Special Warfare Training Centre	Malaysian Army	Amphibious beach raid or airfield seizure	Sherwood green	Fairbairn–Sykes fighting knife	Light blue	No
Pusat Latihan Unit Komando 69 Pasukan Gerak Khas	Royal Malaysia Police	Jungle raid	Sand	Glock knife	No	No
Special Actions Unit Training Centre	Royal Malaysia Police	Close Quarter Battle (CQB)	Bordeaux	No	No	No
KD Panglima Garang	Royal Malaysian Navy	Amphibious beach raid	Magenta	Fairbairn–Sykes fighting knife	Dark blue	Yes
RMAF Combat Training School	Royal Malaysian Air Force	Heliborne beach raid	Sky blue	Fairbairn–Sykes fighting knife	Light blue	Yes
Sultan Ahmad Shah Coast Guard Academy	Malaysia Coast Guard	Visit, Board, Search, and Seizure (VBSS)	Scarlet red	Dive knife	Grey	Yes

== Compulsory advanced training ==
Compulsory advanced training refers to mandatory programmes that special forces personnel must complete following their basic selection but before they are considered fully qualified. Currently, the JMF Elite Unit are the only unit in Malaysia that maintains this specific requirement. This programme is conducted immediately after candidates graduate from the Special Warfare Training Centre (PULPAK). For the JMF Elite Unit, the successful completion of this additional phase is the prerequisite for being awarded the Special Operations Insignia.

Previously, the Malaysia Coast Guard's STAR Team required a six-week programme known as the Special Task Introduction Course. Upon graduating from a military-led basic commando course, personnel were required to complete this course before they were officially bestowed with the scarlet red beret. However, as of late 2025, this curriculum has been consolidated into the 16-week Basic Commando Course – STAR Team. Consequently, a separate advanced training phase is no longer required for the Coast Guard's special forces candidates, as the specialised modules are now integrated into the primary selection pipeline.

== Continuation training ==
After graduating, individuals still need to attend various special operations courses before being granted operational status. Importantly, these courses are not conducted consecutively, and graduates have resting periods between them. Depending on the availability of class slots, the fastest time to complete all courses, from the beginning of their Basic Commando Course or Basic Special Actions Unit Course until receiving operational status, is two years.

== See also ==
- UK Joint Special Forces Selection
- United States Army Special Forces selection and training
- United States Navy SEAL selection and training
- Basic Rapid Deployment Force Course (Malaysia) – Selection for the Malaysian Army special operations infantry
