= Royal Air Force Commandos =

- Active: 1942–1946
- Country: United Kingdom
- Branch: Royal Air Force
- Type: Commando
- Size: 2,400 men in 18 units
- Part of: Combined Operations
- Engagements: Second World War

Royal Air Force Commandos were formed from units of the Royal Air Force (RAF) during the Second World War. They were formed in 1942 and served in the European and Far Eastern theatres of war before being disbanded in 1946. In 1944 RAF Commandos of the Second Tactical Air Force suffered very heavy casualties landing at Dog Green Sector of Omaha Beach to establish field operations in support of the US Army

== Background ==
The commander of Combined Operations Louis Mountbatten on 22 January 1942 recommended that the RAF create a number of Commando units. These units, called Servicing Commandos, would accompany the Allied Armies when they invaded Europe, either to make German airfields serviceable or to make operational the new airstrips built by the Army Airfield Construction Units. Eventually 12 Servicing Commandos were formed in the United Kingdom and three in the Middle East. The force consisted of 2,400 officers and men skilled in aircraft maintenance, armaments, communications and airfield activation skills and were capable of working on all types of aircraft to keep them flying under all kinds of conditions.

These Commando units were trained on similar lines to the British Army and Royal Marines Commandos. Each Commando unit comprised two or three officers and between 150 and 170 other ranks. They were equipped with jeeps, motorcycles and up to 15 three-ton trucks. Commando units were involved in the major seaborne landings, either going in with the initial invasion forces or giving active support in other ways to keep the aircraft flying.

=== Far East ===
As well as the 15 Servicing Commandos in Europe and the Middle East three smaller units were formed in India, and called Servicing Parties. Each Servicing Party comprised one officer and 30 men. These units were part of the RAF Support Group and supported the Chindits during Operation Thursday. After the surrender of the Japanese Forces in August 1945 they took over Japanese held airfields, assisted in the evacuation of Allied prisoners of war and undertook other peace keeping duties in Java, Thailand and French Indo China.

== Operations ==
In the Mediterranean, Servicing Commandos took part in operations in North Africa, landings in Sicily, landings in Italy and landing in the South of France. Servicing Commando units also took part in the Normandy landings and afterwards some units were withdrawn for service in the Far East.

== Units ==
Formed in the United Kingdom

- No. 3201 Servicing Commando was formed in March 1942 from men serving in RAF Fighter Command and served in North Africa, Sicily, Italy and the South of France.
- No. 3202 Servicing Commando was formed in March 1942 from men serving in RAF Fighter Command and served in North Africa, Sicily, Italy and the South of France.
- No. 3203 Servicing Commando was formed in March 1942 from men serving in RAF Fighter Command and served in North Africa, Sicily, Italy and the South of France.
- No. 3204 Servicing Commando was formed in February 1943, from men serving in RAF Fighter Command and served in North Africa.
- No. 3205 Servicing Commando was formed in April 1943 from men serving in RAF Fighter Command and served in Normandy, India, Burma, French Indo-China, Malaya, Thailand and Java.
- No. 3206 Servicing Commando was formed in April 1943 from men serving in RAF Fighter Command and served in France, Belgium, and the Netherlands.
- No. 3207 Servicing Commando was formed in April 1943 from men serving in RAF Fighter Command and served in Normandy, India, Burma, French Indo-China, Malaya, Thailand and Java.
- No. 3208 Servicing Commando was formed in April 1943 from men serving in RAF Fighter Command and served in Europe.
- No. 3209 Servicing Commando was formed in April 1943 from men serving in RAF Fighter Command and served in Normandy, India, Burma, French Indo-China, Malaya, Thailand and Java.
- No. 3210 Servicing Commando was formed in April 1943 from men serving in RAF Fighter Command and served in Normandy, India, Burma, French Indo-China, Malaya, Thailand and Java.
- No. 3225 Servicing Commando was formed in August 1942 from men serving in RAF Army Cooperation Command and served in Sicily and Italy.
- No. 3226 Servicing Commando was formed in March 1942 from men serving in RAF Army Cooperation and served in Sicily and Italy.

Formed in the Middle East

- No. 3230 Servicing Commando was formed in April 1942 from men serving in RAF Middle East Command and served in Sicily and Italy.
- No. 3231 Servicing Commando was formed in April 1942 from men serving in RAF Middle East Command and served in Sicily and Italy.
- No. 3232 Servicing Commando was formed in April 1942 from men serving in RAF Middle East Command and served in Sicily and Italy.

Formed in India

- No. 1 Servicing Party was formed from men in RAF Far East Command and served in India, Burma, Java, Thailand and French Indo China.
- No. 2 Servicing Party was formed from men in RAF Far East Command and served in India, Burma, Java, Thailand and French Indo China.
- No. 3 Servicing Party was formed from men in RAF Far East Command and served in India, Burma, Java, Thailand and French Indo China.

== Battle honours ==
The following Battle honours were awarded to the British Commandos during the Second World War.

- Adriatic
- Alethangyaw
- Aller
- Anzio
- Argenta Gap
- Burma 1943–45
- Crete
- Dieppe
- Dives Crossing
- Djebel Choucha
- Flushing
- Greece 1944–45
- Italy 1943–45
- Kangaw
- Landing at Porto San Venere
- Landing in Sicily
- Leese
- Madagascar
- Middle East 1941, 1942, 1944
- Monte Ornito
- Myebon
- Normandy Landing
- North Africa 1941–43
- North-West Europe 1942, 1944–1945
- Norway 1941
- Pursuit to Messina
- Rhine
- St. Nazaire
- Salerno
- Sedjenane 1
- Sicily 1943
- Steamroller Farm
- Syria 1941
- Termoli
- Vaagso
- Valli di Comacchio
- Westkapelle
