= Agrupación Antisecuestros Aéreos =

Chilean Air Force's Special Forces group

The Anti Aircraft Hijacking Group (Spanish: Agrupación Antisecuestros Aéreos) is Chilean Air Force's Special Forces group whose main function is to intervene during any aircraft hijackings on Chilean territory. Its members are recognised for their professionalism and discretion, one of the most important requirements for members of this unit is to know every part of an airport where they may likely be deployed to during any hijackings.

The unit's main headquarters is located in the Aviation Group No10 in the Arturo Merino Benítez International Airport in the city of Santiago.
