= Security forces =

Statutory organization with internal security mandates

Afghan Local Police, Afghan National Army, and United States Army personnel during a presence patrol in Logar Province, Afghanistan in 2013

Security forces are statutory organizations with internal security mandates. In the legal context of several countries, the term has variously denoted police and military units working in concert, or the role of irregular military and paramilitary forces (such as gendarmerie) tasked with public security duties.

== List of security forces ==
Examples of formally designated security forces include:

- Afghan National Security Forces
- Airports Security Force of Pakistan
- No. 1 Security Forces Squadron of Australia
- No. 2 Security Forces Squadron of Australia
- Border Security Force of India
- Central Industrial Security Force of India
- Central Security Forces of Egypt
- Federal Security Force of Pakistan
- Israeli Security Forces
- Internal Security Forces of Lebanon
- Iraqi Security Forces
- Kurdistan Region Security Forces
- Irish Security Forces
- Kosovo Security Force
- Macau Security Force
- National Public Security Force of Brazil
- Palestinian National Security Forces
- Public Security Forces of Bahrain
- Puntland Security Force
- Galmudug Security Force
- Rhodesian Security Forces
- RNZAF Security Forces
- Security Forces Command of Northern Cyprus
- Social Security Forces of North Korea
- Sri Lanka Civil Security Force
- United States Air Force Security Forces
- United States Marine Corps Security Force

== See also ==
- Airport security force
- Air Force Security Forces
- Internal Troops
- Naval Security Forces
- Public Security Force (disambiguation)
