= RMAF Special Forces =

Special forces of the Royal Malaysian Air Force

- Pasukan Khas TUDM ڤاسوكن خاص تنترا اودارا
- RMAF Special Forces skill badge
- Founded: 1996; 30 years ago
- Country: Malaysia
- Branch: Royal Malaysian Air Force
- Type: Special forces
- Size: 5 squadrons
- Part of: RMAF Regiment
- Headquarters: Jugra Air Base, Selangor
- Nicknames: "PASKAU", "RMAF PASKAU", "Komando Tentera Udara" ('Air force's commando')
- Mottos: Cepat, Senyap, Pasti ('Swift, Stealth, Definite')
- Beret: Sky blue
- Anniversaries: 1 April
- Engagements: List: SAR operations (1996–present); Mount Galla incident; PASKAU Boat Capsizing; Piper 28 crash; Brinchang incident; Mount Batu Tiban incident; Hawk 208 crash; Genting Sempah Incident; Arab–Israeli conflict (1948–present); UNIFIL (2007–present); War in Afghanistan (2001–2021); Operation Enduring Freedom; ISAF (2010–2014); Cross border attacks in Sabah (1962–present); Operation Daulat (2013); Russo-Ukrainian War (2014–present); Negotiation Team for MH17 (2014)

Commanders
- Current commander: Colonel Muhammad Mustafa Omar RMAF
- Notable commanders: Mior Rosli

Insignia
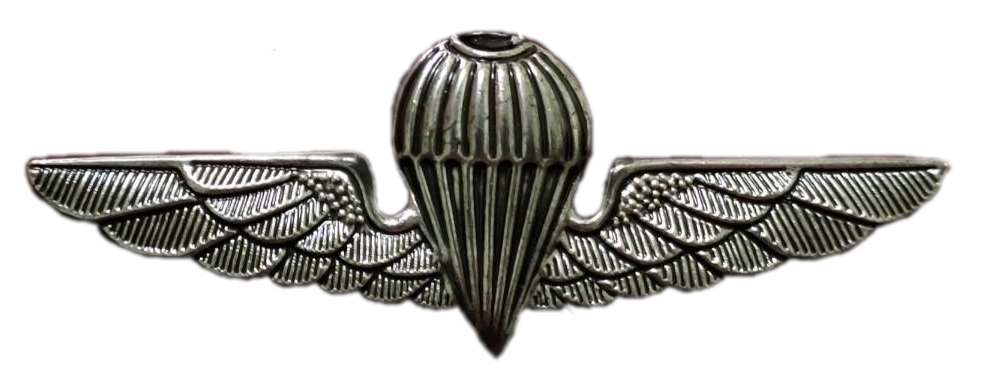
- Parachutist badge

The RMAF Special Forces (Malay: Pasukan Khas TUDM, Jawi: ڤاسوكن خاص تنترا اودارا), better known as PASKAU from an abbreviation of its Malay name, (Note: "PASKAU" abbreviated from Pasukan Khas Tentera Udara Diraja Malaysia) are the special forces of the Royal Malaysian Air Force (RMAF; Malay: Tentera Udara Diraja Malaysia – TUDM). It is one of the three components that make up the RMAF Regiment (Malay: Rejimen TUDM).

Its main functions are to carry out high-value target protection, ground forward air controller, combat search and rescue and rescuing downed aircrew assignments. RMAF Special Forces is also tasked as the principal anti-hijack response force for military and civil aircraft in Malaysia. This task was taken over from 21st Special Service Group. All RMAF Special Forces members are airborne and commando-trained and can be deployed behind enemy lines via air, land and sea to assist in target designation for the Malaysian Armed Forces and RMAF missions.

The commanding officer of the RMAF Special Forces is Colonel Muhammad Mustafa Omar RMAF, having held the position since July 2023.

== History ==
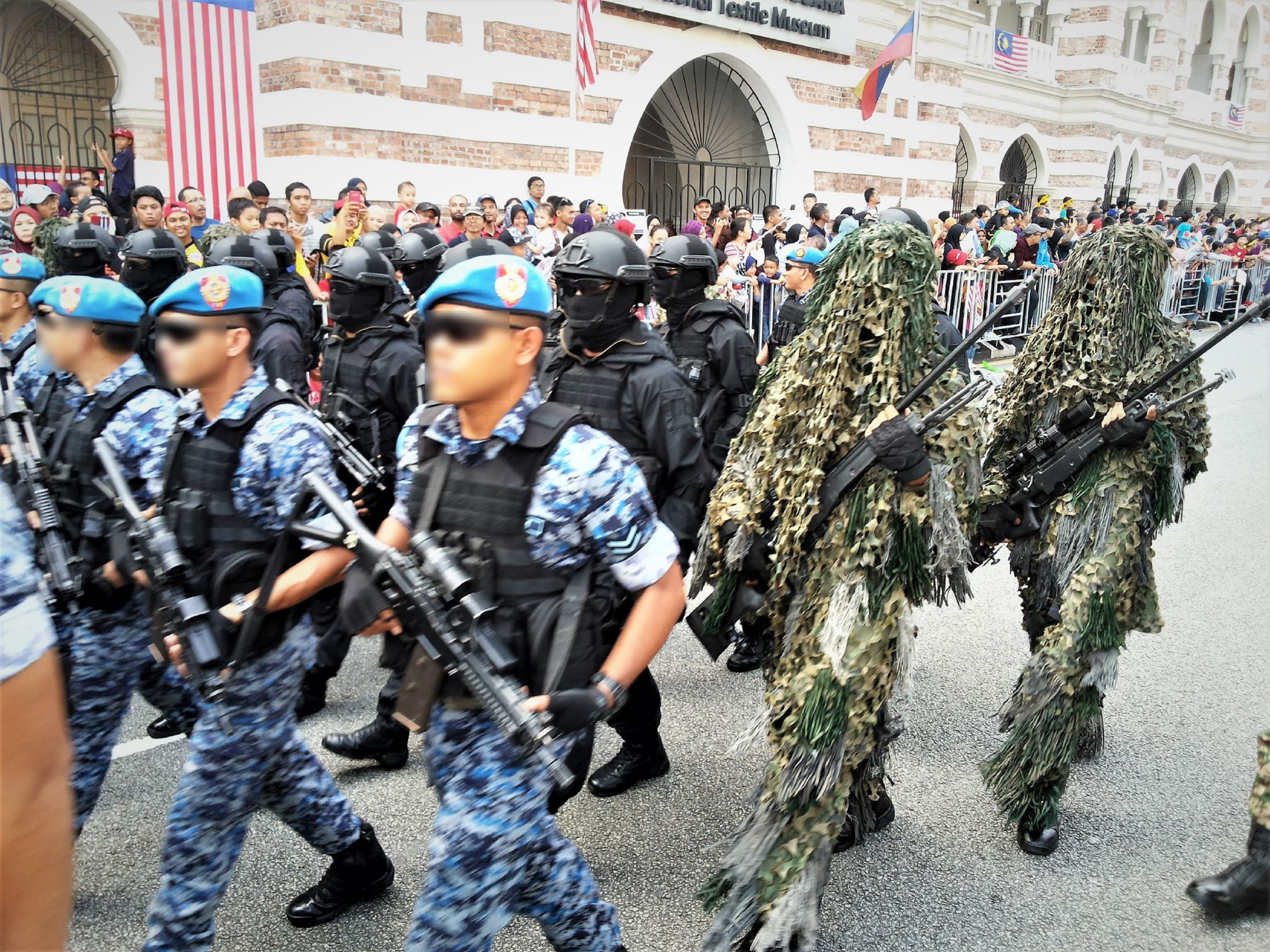
RMAF Special Forces detachments dressed in the No.4 Digital Camouflage combat uniform, tactical gear and ghillie suits parading during the 60th Merdeka Day Parade at Sultan Abdul Samad Street in Kuala Lumpur.

The RMAF Special Forces were officially established on 1 April 2002, but their lineage traces back to the RMAF Air and Ground Defence Force, better known as HANDAU (an abbreviation of its Malay name), which was an infantry unit of the RMAF.

=== Origin: RMAF Air and Ground Defence Force (HANDAU) ===
The RMAF Special Forces traces its lineage back to 1974, following a mortar attack by Malayan Communist Party members outside RMAF Kuala Lumpur. Another mortar attack in 1979 damaged an RMAF DHC-4 Caribou transport aircraft. These incidents prompted a specific directive from the Air Force Command to form a new security force to take over the security of RMAF air bases from the Malaysian Army's Malaysian Military Police Corps (now known as the Royal Military Police Corps).

The unit was drafted at the end of 1976 by Group Captain Abdul Kadir Abu Bakar, Squadron Leader Lai Kiat Meng, and Flight Lieutenant Mior Rosli. Flight Lieutenant Mior Rosli was later selected as the unit's first commanding officer. Corporal Mahazir became the first airman to receive commando training at the Special Warfare Training Centre in Malacca. Subsequently, more officers and airmen were trained, leading to the establishment of the Pasukan Pertahanan Darat dan Udara (the "Air and Ground Defence Force"), abbreviated as HANDAU, on 1 April 1980. This new force was tasked with the security of RMAF air bases, and the first HANDAU squadron was named No. 102 Squadron HANDAU (Malay: Skuadron 102 HANDAU).

The HANDAU was reactivated on 1 June 2020, by the Air Force Command (Malay: Markas Tentera Udara – MTU). Existing RMAF Provost Squadrons were restructured, with half of them being designated as HANDAU squadrons. This restructuring expanded their responsibilities beyond military police duties to include roles as air force ground forces and security forces.

=== Expansion and the RMAF Security Regiment ===
On 1 April 1980, the No. 102 Squadron formally assumed base security duties at RMAF Kuala Lumpur from the Military Police. To oversee the new squadrons, the RMAF Security Regiment (Malay: Markas Rejimen Keselamatan TUDM, abbreviated MAREJ) was established as the command headquarters. Between 1980 and 1 March 1987, ten additional HANDAU squadrons were raised.

List of RMAF HANDAU squadrons
Name	Garrison	EST.
No. 102 Squadron HANDAU	RMAF Kuala Lumpur	1980-04-01
No. 103 Squadron HANDAU	RMAF Kuantan	1980-11-18
No. 104 Squadron HANDAU	RMAF Butterworth	1981-01-10
No. 105 Squadron HANDAU	RMAF Kuching	1981-04-07
No. 106 Squadron HANDAU	RMAF Labuan	1987-03-01
No. 107 Squadron HANDAU	RMAF Alor Setar	1981-07-07
No. 109 Squadron HANDAU	RMAF Aircraft Overhaul Depot (DEBKAT), Subang Airport	1981-08-06
No. 201 Squadron HANDAU	RMAF Jugra	1987-08-27
No. 202 Squadron HANDAU	RMAF Ipoh	1981-02-09
No. 204 Squadron HANDAU	RMAF Kluang	1981-08-19
No. 208 Squadron HANDAU	RMAF Subang	1987-09-01
Combat Air Rescue Team	RMAF Kuala Lumpur	1983
Rapid Deployment Force	RMAF Kuala Lumpur	1983

=== Transition to the RMAF Regiment ===
Since its establishment in 1980, the RMAF Security Regiment reported directly to the Air Force Command (Malay: Markas Tentera Udara – MTU) for all operations involving HANDAU squadrons. Following a major reorganisation of the RMAF in June 1983, the RMAF Security Regiment was transferred to the RMAF Air Operations High Command (Malay: Markas Besar Operasi Udara – MABES, now known as the RMAF Air Operations Command) and was subsequently renamed the RMAF Regiment.

As part of the same reorganisation, two special operations elements were established within the regiment: the Combat Air Rescue Team (CART) (Malay: Tim Penyelamat Tempur Udara) and the Rapid Deployment Force (RDF) (Malay: Pasukan Gerak Cepat). CART included a small number of Gerak Khas commandos seconded from the Malaysian Army, while the RDF was composed of HANDAU personnel trained in commando skills and stationed at major RMAF bases. The RDF functioned as an air assault unit, capable of reinforcing armed forces units or jungle police paramilitary elements in need of support, while CART specialised in combat search and rescue (CSAR) missions. Both formations are widely regarded as the precursors of the modern RMAF Special Forces.

In 1993, the HANDAU squadrons were redesignated as the RMAF Provost Squadrons. Their role was expanded to include military police duties alongside their primary responsibility for air base security.

=== Merger and formation of PKU, later redesignated as PASKAU ===
In 1996, the Combat Air Rescue Team (CART) and the Rapid Deployment Force (RDF) were merged to form a new unit, the Pasukan Khas Udara (PKU) (lit. 'Air Special Forces'), also referred to as the "RMAF Special Air Service". The PKU was expanded, and its remit broadened to include counter-terrorism, unconventional warfare, and search and rescue operations. For these new roles, its personnel received training from the British Special Air Service (SAS) and the United States Special Operations Forces.

On 17 March 1999, the PKU was relocated from RMAF Kuala Lumpur to RMAF Jugra. At the same time, the RMAF Provost Squadrons were separated from the RMAF Regiment and transferred to the newly established RMAF Provost Marshal Department, which assumed responsibility for air force law enforcement.

On 1 April 2002, exactly 22 years after the establishment of HANDAU, the PKU was officially redesignated as the Pasukan Khas TUDM (PASKAU), or "RMAF Special Forces".

On 24 January 2008, Sultan Ahmad Shah of Pahang was appointed Colonel-in-Chief of the RMAF Regiment and simultaneously became patron of the RMAF Special Forces. The investiture ceremony was held at Jugra Air Base, Selangor, where the Chief of Air Force, General Azizan Ariffin RMAF (later Chief of Defence Force in 2009), presented the blue beret of the RMAF Special Forces to Sultan Ahmad Shah.

== Structures ==
RMAF Special Forces commandos from the Field Protection Squadron were armed with Colt M4A1 assault rifles, providing security coverage for the USAF C-17 Globemaster III transport aircraft during the 2009 USAF Thunderbirds air show at RMAF Subang Air Base.

=== 1980–2023 ===
1980–1993

RMAF Security Regiment
  - Air and Ground Defence Force (HANDAU)
    - HANDAU squadrons (x11 squadrons)
    - Combat Air Rescue Team
    - Rapid Deployment Force

1993–2002

RMAF Regiment
  - RMAF Provost
  - RMAF Special Air Service
    - Combat Air Rescue Team
    - Rapid Deployment Force

2002–2020

RMAF Regiment
  - RMAF Special Forces
    - Combat Wing Squadron
      - Flight Hostage Rescue Team
      - Ground Forward Air Controller
    - Combat Air Rescue Squadron
      - Maritime Pararescue Team
    - Field Protection Squadron

2020–2021

RMAF Regiment
  - RMAF Special Forces
    - Combat Wing Squadron
      - Flight Hostage Rescue Team
      - Ground Forward Air Controller
    - Combat Air Rescue Squadron
      - Maritime Pararescue Team
    - Field Protection Squadron
  - RMAF Ground Defence Force

=== Current structures ===
Today, the RMAF Regiment operates directly under the RMAF Air Operations Command and is based at Jugra Air Base in Banting. Here are the five main squadrons of RMAF Special Forces:

RMAF Special Forces squadrons, responsibility and roles
Squadron	Responsibility	Roles
Special Air Combat Assault Squadron	Pathfinders and forward air controllers	The Special Air Combat Assault Squadron (SACA) provides the RMAF and Malaysian Armed Forces with pathfinders and forward air controllers. This unit, also known as RMAF FAC (Royal Malaysian Air Force Forward Air Controllers), can be deployed behind enemy lines via helicopter or parachute. They use AN/PEQ-1 SOFLAM Ground Laser Target Designation (GLTD) teams for forward target acquisition and tracking for attacking aircraft. Each mission involves six personnel with various specialisations, including cross-trained signallers, medics, weapons specialists, demolition experts, snipers, and boatmen. This squadron was officially created in 2021. Despite being a newly established squadron, it has a long track record as the Ground Forward Air Controller (GFAC), which was previously part of the Combat Wing Squadron. The Combat Wing Squadron was officially disbanded in 2021. This squadron functions similarly to both U.S. Air Force Combat Control Team and U.S. Air Force Special Operations Force Tactical Air Control Party within the Air Force Special Operations Command.
Combat Air Rescue Squadron	Land-based combat search and rescue	The Combat Air Rescue Squadron (CARS; Malay: Skuadron Penyelamat Tempur Udara – SPTU) is capable of conducting combat search and rescue operations behind enemy lines. It consists of six flights operating from air bases with Rescue Sub-Centres (RSC) located at Subang Air Base, Kuantan Air Base, Butterworth Air Base, Gong Kedak Air Base, Kuching Air Base, and Labuan Air Base. CARS is equivalent to the U.S. Air Force Pararescue in terms of its capabilities and functions.
Force Protection Squadron	Special protections, security force and counter-terrorism	The Force Protection Squadron (FPS; Malay: Skuadron Kawalan Medan – SKM) is responsible for securing high-value military assets such as hangars, air defence radars, and fire support bases. Their duties include protecting infrastructure and conducting close or special escort operations. For area protection, the squadron uses the Field Intrusion Detection System (FIDS). Prior to 2021, this unit was known as the Field Protection Squadron. As part of the RMAF Regiment's restructuring under the Capability Development 55 (CAP55) plan in 2021, and with the reactivation of the RMAF Ground Defence Force (RMAF HANDAU) in 2020, the responsibility for securing air force bases was shared between RMAF HANDAU's squadrons and the FPS. While the FPS continues its security role, its focus has shifted to more sensitive areas and bases behind enemy lines. Additionally, the Hostage Rescue Team, the RMAF Special Forces' counter-terrorist unit, which was previously under the Combat Wing Squadron, was transferred to the FPS. The FPS is equivalent to the 24th Special Tactics Squadron and U.S. Air Force DAGRE in terms of its capabilities and functions.
Maritime Para Rescue Squadron	Maritime-based combat search and rescue	The Maritime Para Rescue Squadron is a combat search and rescue squadron specialising in search and rescue operations at sea. They operate from air bases near the ocean. Before 2021, they were known as the Maritime Pararescue Team and were part of the Combat Air Rescue Squadron. Following the reorganisation, the Combat Air Rescue Squadron now focuses on combat search and rescue operations on land and in the jungle.
Special Operations Support Squadron	Combat support	The Special Operations Support Squadron provides all RMAF Special Forces squadrons with combat support.

=== Deactivated squadron ===
==== Combat Wing Squadron ====
The Combat Wing Squadron (CWS; Malay: Skuadron Sayap Tempur – SST) was the primary combat arm of the RMAF Special Forces. While other squadrons focused on search and rescue or security operations, the CWS specialised in counter-terrorism, hostage rescue, infiltration, sabotage, and covert operations targeting high-value objectives. Based at Jugra Air Base, the squadron included the Flight Hostage Rescue Team (FHRT), a counter-terrorism unit specifically trained for aircraft hostage rescue operations.

As part of the Capability Development 55 plan, the CWS was disbanded in 2021. Its responsibilities were redistributed between the Force Protection Squadron and the Special Air Combat Assault Squadron, ensuring continuity of its critical roles in Malaysia's defence strategy.

== National special operations force ==
In 2016, the main counter-terrorism operators in Malaysia were consolidated into a single special operations task force. Several commandos from the Flight Hostage Rescue Team (FHRT) of RMAF Special Forces were selected to be part of this National Special Operations Force. However, the National Special Operations Force was disbanded in July 2018.

== Selection, training and expertise ==
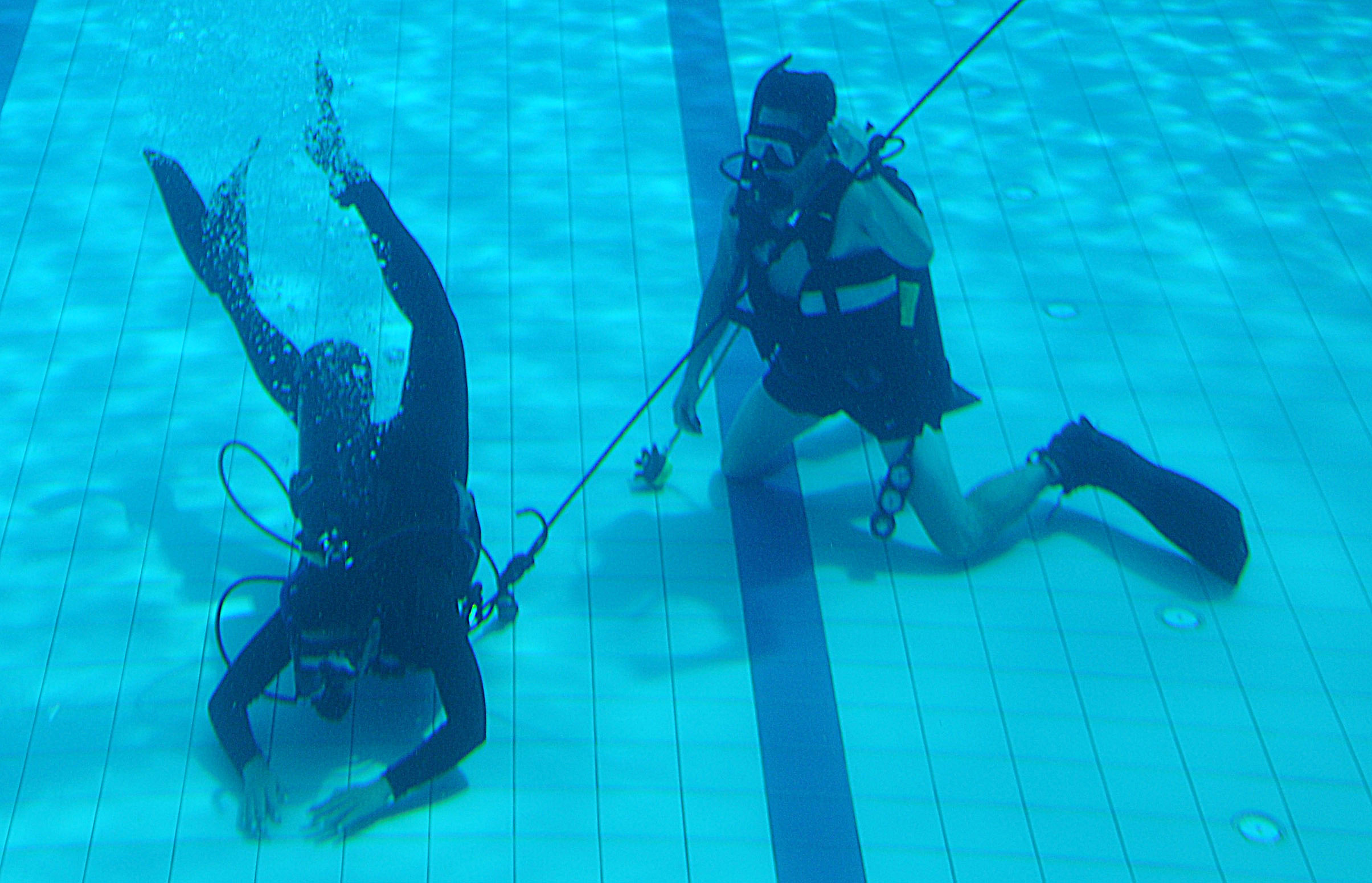
A RMAF Special Forces trainee in the Diving Phase being supervised by a USAF 320th Special Tactics Squadron's instructor.

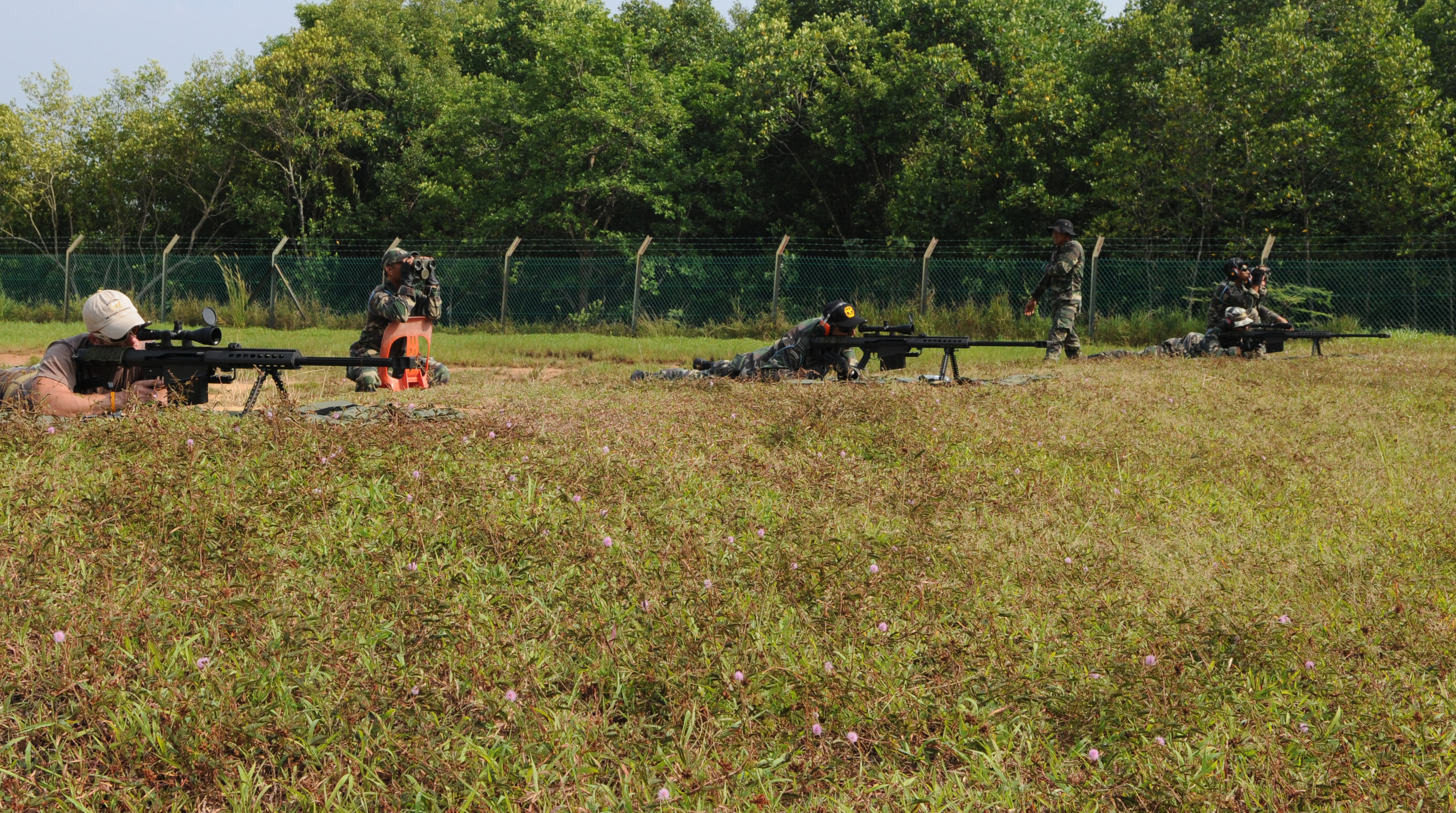
RMAF Special Forces and USAF 320th Special Tactics personnel firing the Barret M82A1 (M107) sniper rifles during a tactical long range course as a part of Teak Mint 09-1.

Originally, passing the commando school was not mandatory for all HANDAU officers and airmen, but it became compulsory for those in special operations units. Since 1996, completing the basic commando course has been a requirement for any RMAF personnel wishing to join the PKU (now PASKAU). In 1993, the RMAF established its own commando course, the RMAF Commando Course (Malay: Kursus Komando TUDM), replacing the previous requirement for RMAF Regiment airmen to complete the Malaysian Army Basic Commando Course at the Special Warfare Training Centre.

The RMAF Special Forces selection and training process takes place at the RMAF Combat Training School at RMAF Bukit Ibam Air Force Base in Pahang. Established in 2018, the school took over responsibility for the RMAF basic commando course from the RMAF Regiment at Jugra Air Base in 2019. Upon graduation, all participants receive a sky blue beret, a light blue lanyard, and a Fairbairn-Sykes fighting knife. However, achieving operational status requires further special operations training.

On 6 May 2004, only 81 out of 198 personnel who started the three-month Basic Commando training program received their blue berets, including the top trainee, Aircraftman Meor Mohd Nazri Othman. Similarly, in October 2007, only 20 out of 54 trainees successfully completed the training.

=== RMAF Commando Course ===
The course lasts for 12 weeks and has six modules. In this course, trainees will learn land, sea and air insertion, jungle warfare tactics, sabotage and hostage rescue.

1. Camp Module
2. 160 kilometres (99 mi) Long-distance march
3. Jungle Training Module
4. Water Training Module
5. 120 kilometres (75 mi) Dark Water Module
6. Survival, Escape, Resistance, Evasion (SERE) Module

=== RMAF Special Forces Expert Course ===
RMAF Special Forces operatives are capable of conducting operations using:

Tactical

- Close quarters combat – CQC
- Combat diving
- Counter-insurgency
- Counter-terrorism
- Counter-sniper tactics
- Laser-designation – Using AN/PEQ-1 SOFLAM GLTD II, the units 'paint' hostile targets, marking them for attack by air-dropped laser-guided munitions such as the Paveway II LGB (laser-guided bomb)
- Marksmanship
- Sabotage
- Sang Moo Doo (multi-technique martial arts including Aikido, Judo, Karate and Taekwondo)
- Snipers
- Unconventional warfare

Insertion techniques

- High-altitude military parachuting – high altitude low opening/high altitude high opening of parachutes
- Single occupant delivery operation module – insertion via fighter jet
- Hover jump
- Rappelling
- Special patrol insertion/extraction – SPIE rig

Intelligence gathering

- Special reconnaissance
- Counterintelligence
- Signal intelligence – SIGINT
- Long-range reconnaissance patrol
- Providing base security to RMAF installations

Expertise-oriented

- Combat search and rescue (The recovery of friendly units from behind enemy lines)
- Operations in built up areas – OBUA
- Fighting in built-up areas – FIBUA
- Military operations on urbanized terrain – MOUT
- Hostage rescue
- Special demolitions
- Explosive ordnance disposal – EOD

During May 2009, RMAF Special Forces participated with the United States Air Force 320th Special Tactics Squadron in an underwater search and recovery course as part of a joint training exercise code-named Teak Mint 09-1. The USAF presented Barret M107 anti-material rifles for use by the RMAF Special Forces team. Teak Mint 09-1 is a joint training exchange designed to enhance United States – Malaysian military training and capabilities.

== Role ==
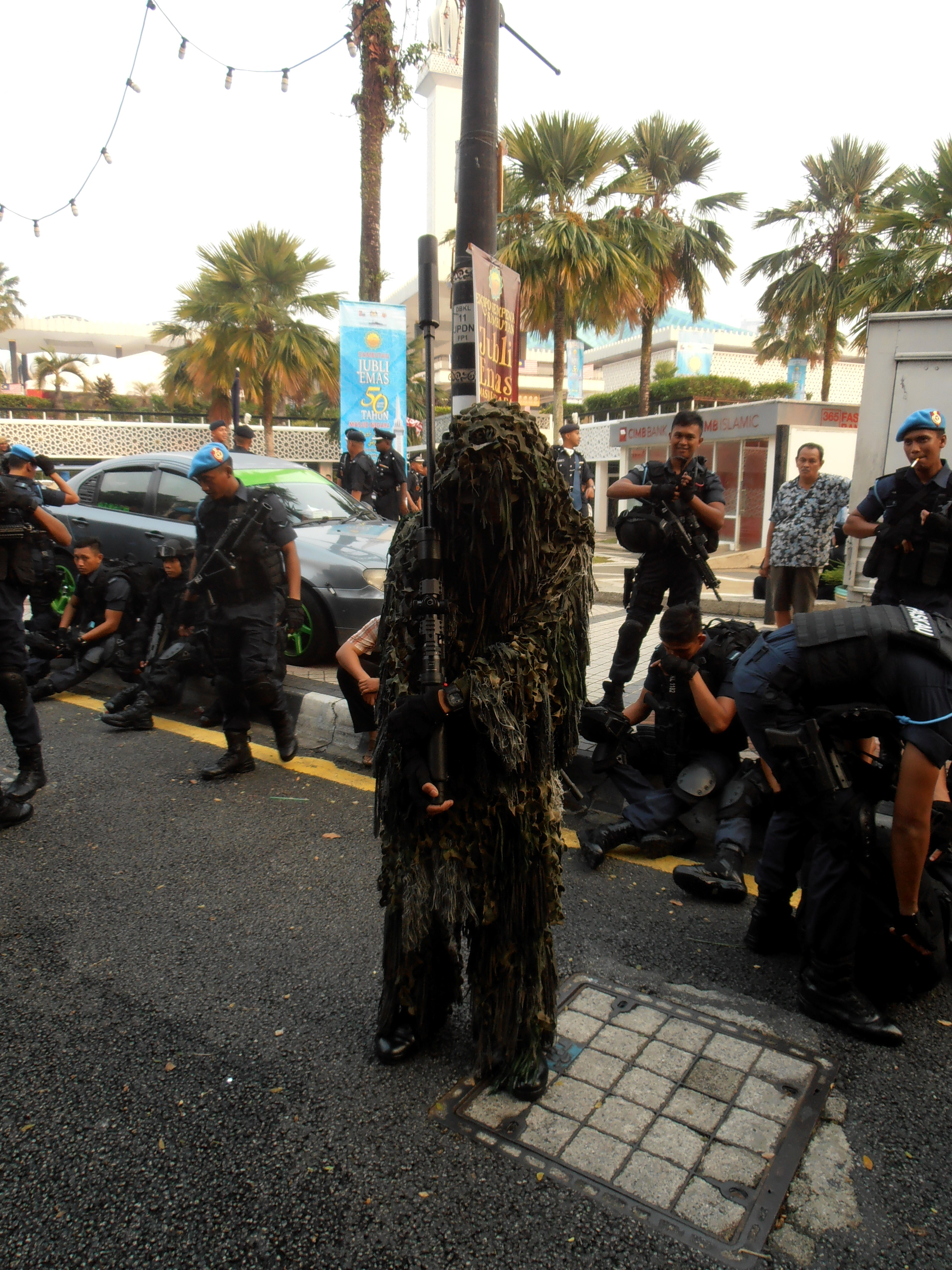
A sniper from the RMAF Special Forces is equipped with an Accuracy International Arctic Warfare sniper rifle fitted with a silencer.

The establishment of RMAF Special Forces has significantly enhanced the RMAF's capabilities in special air operations, including combat search and rescue (CSAR). RMAF Special Forces is also responsible for securing forward RMAF bases and assisting in the execution of air strikes using specialist weapons. This unit consists of specially selected and trained RMAF Regiment personnel, and its role is distinct from that of the army's Gerak Khas and the navy's PASKAL.

Target marking

To mark a target for an air strike, such as radar or surface-to-air-missile (SAM) sites, sub-units must be able to infiltrate behind enemy lines. The target can then be 'painted' using GLTD II.

Security of important assets

The unit must secure critical RMAF areas from enemy ground attack. The task is made harder in forwarding locations and other hostile environments where the threat level is higher.

Search and rescue

Search and rescue missions, on land (on both sides of the lines) and at sea, are the responsibility of RMAF Special Forces. A wide variety of circumstances are usually encountered. For instance, when a Sikorsky S61 "Nuri" helicopter crashed on the slopes of Gunung Gerah (lit. 'Mount Gerah') in November 1989, reaching the wreckage required abseiling into the jungle.

Counter-terrorism

Incidents involving hijacked aircraft and terrorists throughout Malaysia come under the remit of RMAF Special Forces. The unit is trained to solve the problem with the least effect on the passengers and aircraft.

== Identities ==
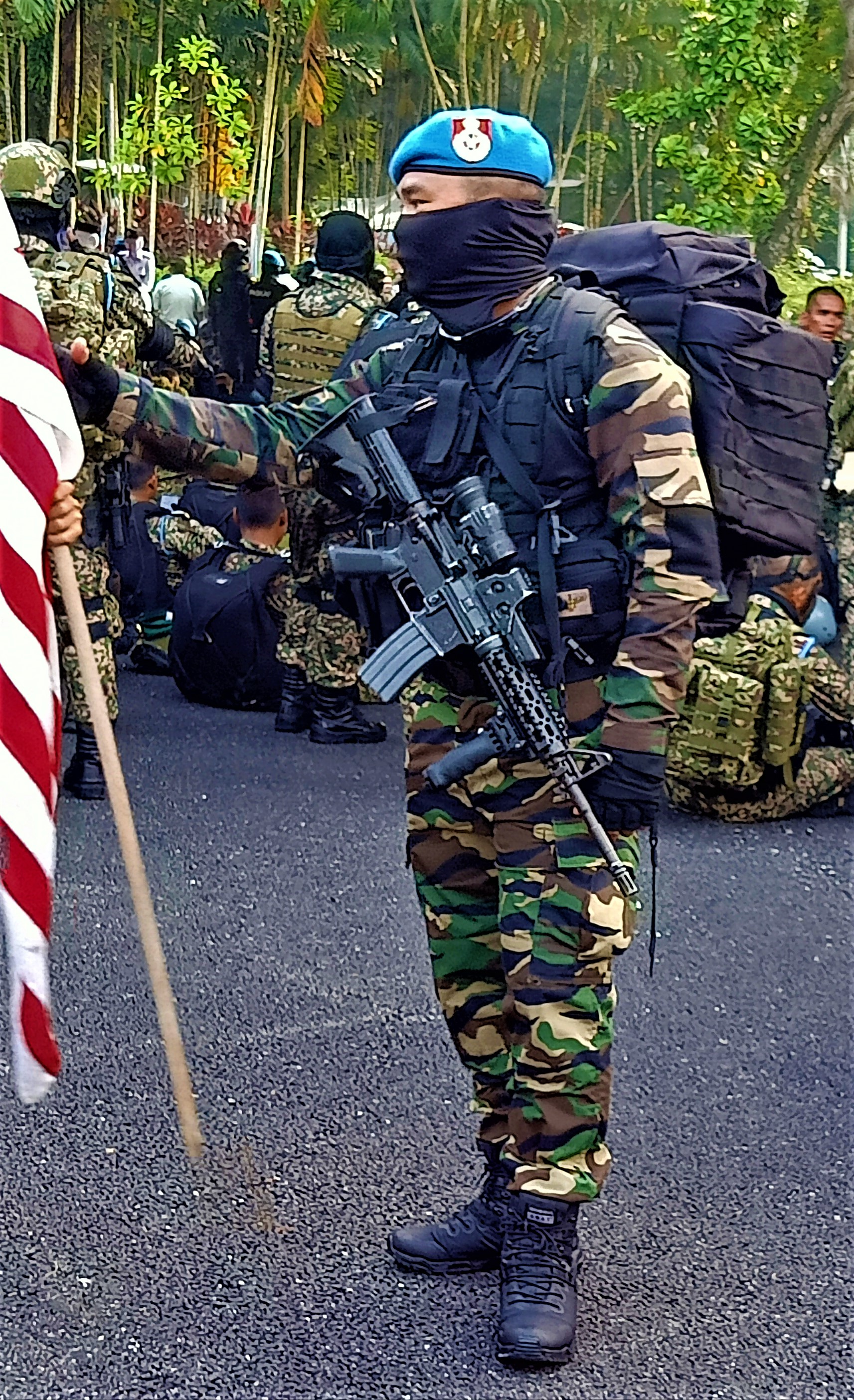
During the 65th Merdeka Day celebration in Kuala Lumpur, a RMAF Special Forces commando armed with a Colt M4A1 SOPMOD passed the Malaysian Stripes of Glory to another individual. His uniform featured a tiger-stripe camouflage pattern and a sky-blue beret, worn with an RMAF NCO beret insignia set upon a red RMAF Regiment backing, with the badge positioned over the left temple.

=== Sky Blue Beret ===
The sky blue beret is the distinctive headgear of the RMAF Special Forces commandos, symbolising their elite status. It features a red RMAF Regiment beret backing (beret flash), with officers wearing a woven RMAF insignia and other ranks displaying metal insignia corresponding to their rank. The beret is awarded upon successfully completing the rigorous Special Forces Selection.

Initially, all HANDAU personnel within the RMAF Regiment wore the sky blue beret, regardless of their role in special operations or provost duties. Commando-trained HANDAU members used to wear a green beret with the Gerak Khas cap badge, similar to the 21st Special Service Group but with a red RMAF Regiment backing. After the RMAF Provost Unit split from the RMAF Regiment, they adopted the navy blue beret, in line with other conventional RMAF units. Commando-trained personnel in the Provost unit had to choose between joining the RMAF Special Forces and keeping the sky blue beret or staying with the Provost unit and wearing the navy blue beret.

Today, the sky blue beret is worn exclusively by the RMAF Special Forces. Like other Malaysian elite units, the cap badge is worn on the left side of the beret, positioned between the eyebrow and ear (temple). The beret-wearing style of all Malaysian special forces has its origins in the Royal Marines Commando Snipers. (Note: The Royal Marines Commando Snipers adopted this placement for practical reasons: the metal badge faces the side to reduce visibility, minimising the risk of detection while sniping. This tradition was carried forward into the Malaysian Special Service Unit and later influenced the beret-wearing practices of other Malaysian special forces, including the RMAF Special Forces.)

=== Light Blue Lanyard ===
In the past, every commando-trained member of HANDAU was awarded a light blue lanyard, along with a green beret and a Fairbairn-Sykes commando dagger, upon completing their commando training at the Special Warfare Training Centre. This tradition of the light blue lanyard traces back to the Malaysian Special Service Unit, which adopted it from the 40 Commando, Royal Marines, during its founding. The tradition was upheld by HANDAU and later by the RMAF Special Forces, even after the RMAF began conducting its own commando course in 1993.

=== RMAF Special Forces Skill badge ===
The skill badge is a qualification mark awarded to military personnel after being officially assigned to the squadrons within the RMAF Special Forces. This occurs only after the successful completion of the special forces selection process.

The design of the badge incorporates several elements representing the unit's capabilities and heritage:

- Wings: A traditional symbol denoting an airborne-trained unit.
- Shield with battlement design: Represents the lineage of the RMAF Special Forces, originating from the RMAF Air and Ground Defence Force.
- Waves: Symbolise proficiency in maritime operations.
- Commando Dagger: A traditional emblem of special forces, signifying the historical relationship between the unit and the Malaysian Army's Gerak Khas.
- Ribbon with "CEPAT SENYAP PASTI": Displays the official motto of the RMAF Special Forces.

Within the RMAF, this emblem is strictly categorised as a skill badge (Malay: lencana kemahiran) rather than a primary insignia. It is worn on the breast pocket of the uniform, which distinguishes it from the placement of the Naval Special Forces insignia. While the naval equivalent is typically worn above the left breast pocket, the RMAF reserves that specific area for RMAF trade badges (Malay: lencana ketukangan). Consequently, the RMAF Special Forces badge occupies a different position to accommodate these existing departmental regulations.

=== Commando Dagger ===
Since 2018, the RMAF Combat Training School has been issuing the Fairbairn-Sykes commando dagger to all its graduates, replacing the previous practice of awarding a Glock knife to RMAF Special Forces commandos who completed advanced courses. The Fairbairn-Sykes dagger is considered a prestigious symbol of belonging to an elite commando unit.

=== PASKAU Shoulder flash ===
RMAF Special Forces commandos wear a Shoulder flash embroidered with "PASKAU" on the right shoulder sleeve. Shoulder flash are synonymous with elite forces in the Malaysian Armed Forces. Prior to the unit's name change in 2002, all RMAF commandos wore a "HANDAU" Shoulder flash, as the units that are now part of RMAF Special Forces were previously part of the RMAF Air and Ground Defence Force (HANDAU).

=== Tiger-stripe camouflage and the introduction of the 'Vorcamo' combat uniform ===
As a ground-based formation within the air force, the RMAF Special Forces wear tiger-stripe camouflage combat uniforms as their official attire. This green tiger-stripe pattern was originally employed by the Malaysian Army until its replacement by a digital camouflage design in 2013. The pattern remains in service with the RMAF Special Forces and the RMAF Ground-Based Air Defence units, symbolising their ground-combat role.

In July 2025, the RMAF introduced a new camouflage pattern for its special forces. The design, known as Vorcamo (short for Versatile Operations Resilient Camouflage), is inspired by the Crye Precision MultiCam pattern. Vorcamo is intended to gradually replace the tiger-stripe uniform, which is effective in jungle terrain but less suitable for urban and mixed environments.

An earlier attempt at camouflage standardisation had been made in 2019, when the Malaysian Armed Forces proposed adopting a single camouflage pattern for all of its special forces units. The rationale was that since these units frequently operate together in joint missions, a common combat uniform would ensure greater uniformity and interoperability. The proposed pattern, while derived from MultiCam, incorporated distinctive horizontal elements, and a prototype was publicly displayed by First Admiral Dato' Anuar Alias PGB RMN, then Commanding Officer of the Naval Special Forces, during the 2019 Navy Fleet Open Day. However, no official updates were issued thereafter, most likely due to the COVID-19 pandemic. The proposal has since been considered obsolete, as the RMAF Special Forces adopted Vorcamo, while the Army's 21st Special Service Group opted for the original MultiCam design.

== Equipment ==
Name	Type	Origin	Notes
Glock 18C/19/34	Semi-automatic pistol	(Austria)	
Sphinx S3000	Semi-automatic pistol	(Switzerland)	
SIG Sauer P226	Semi-automatic pistol	(Switzerland)	
Benelli M1014	Shotgun	(Italy)	
Mossberg 590A1	Shotgun	(United States)	
Remington 870 Express / MCS	Shotgun	(United States)	
Brügger & Thomet MP9	PDW	(Switzerland)	
Colt 9 mm SMG	SMG	(United States)	May be fitted with various different optics.
Heckler & Koch MP5A5 / MP5-K / MP5SD6	SMG	(Germany)	Fitted with various different optics and accessories.
Colt M4A1 Carbine	Assault-rifle	(United States)	Fitted with the M203 grenade launcher, Brügger & Thomet Rotex V suppressor, FAB NFR EX rails, Steiner OTAL-A laser designators, MARS sight and various European-made accessories, similar to SOPMOD accessories.
SIG SG 553LB / SB	Assault-rifle	(Switzerland)	Fitted with the SIG GL 5040 grenade launcher, Brügger & Thomet suppressor, the EOTech G33 3X Magnifier and EOTech 553 holographic weapon sight optics.
Accuracy International Arctic Warfare	Sniper-rifle	(United Kingdom)	
AMP Technical Services DSR-1	Sniper-rifle	(Germany)	
Barrett M107A1	Anti-material sniper-rifle	(United States)	
Blaser 93 Tactical	Sniper-rifle	(Germany)	
Heckler & Koch PSG-1A1	DMR	(Germany)	
M249 Squad Automatic Weapon	LMG	(United States)	
FN Minimi Mk.III	GPMG	(Belgium)	
Milkor M32 MSGL	Revolver grenade-launcher	(South Africa)	
M203A1/A2 Grenade Launcher	Grenade-launcher	(United States)	
SIG GL 5040	Grenade launcher	(Switzerland)	

Retired weapons

- M16 rifle variant A1 & M653 Carbine - now use for training and ceremony
- Vektor SP1 semi automatic pistol
- Heckler & Koch P9 semi automatic pistol
- Heckler & Koch PSG1 semi automatic rifle

== Capabilities ==
Mobility

RMAF Special Forces is able to be rapidly inserted into an operational area by land, air or sea.

Flexibility

The group is capable of being deployed independently or as part of a joint task force with other special operations groups.

Sustainability

The unit is able to operate independently and conduct special operations for sustained periods without external assistance.

Technology

The group has access to high-tech equipment and weaponry to improve its ability to execute complex and demanding special operations.

Special training

The group employs specialized physical training that exceeds that of conventional forces. This is to ensure that commandos are well-prepared to execute highly demanding Spec Ops-type missions.

== Future plans ==
The Air Force Command has announced plans to allocate at least one helicopter for the exclusive use of the RMAF Special Forces, primarily for maritime search and rescue (SAR) missions and training purposes. The aircraft is intended to be placed on standby at Jugra Air Base.

Historically, a Sikorsky S-61A-4 Nuri helicopter from No. 3 Squadron had been permanently stationed at Jugra to support the unit. However, following a fatal crash in 2016, the Nuri fleet was grounded and subsequently retired from service. While the exact timeline for a replacement aircraft has not been disclosed, the allocation has been incorporated into the 13th and 14th Malaysia Plans (Malay: Rancangan Malaysia).

== Recent operations ==
=== MH17 Negotiation Team ===
On 18 July 2014, after the tragic downing of Malaysia Airlines Flight 17 over Donetsk, Ukraine, four commandos from the RMAF Special Forces were deployed as security personnel for Malaysia's MH17 Negotiation Team, known as "The Dozen Persons". The four commandos included Major Muhammad Mustafa Omar RMAF, Sergeant Shahrizal Abu Bakar (retired as Warrant Officer II), Corporal Rosli Mustafa (retired as Flight Sergeant), and Leading Aircraftman Mohd Afendy Ahmad Zaini. The team, accompanied by specialists, covertly entered separatist-controlled areas through the warzone to negotiate the repatriation of the remains of MH17 victims, including crew and passengers, and recover the flight recorders essential for the crash investigation.

=== Operation Daulat ===
In March 2013, RMAF Special Forces commandos played a key role in Operation Daulat, a joint operation involving all branches of the Malaysian Armed Forces, Royal Malaysia Police, and Malaysia Coast Guard special forces. RMAF Special Forces commandos conducted psychological operations by dropping leaflets urging Sulu terrorists to surrender. Additionally, they employed Ground Laser Target Designators (GLTD) to mark enemy targets for airstrikes with laser-guided bombs against terrorist camps in Kampung Tanduo, Lahad Datu.

=== MALCON-ISAF ===
Malaysia sent troops, including RMAF Special Forces, 10th Parachute Brigade, 21st Special Service Group and Naval Special Forces (PASKAL) to Afghanistan as part of the International Security Assistance Force (ISAF). The team which consisted of 40 soldiers was deployed to assist New Zealand Armed Forces in the peacekeeping missions and humanitarian aid in the Bamiyan District, Afghanistan.

=== Genting Sempah incident ===
In July 2007, RMAF Special Forces, with the 10th Parachute Brigade, 22nd Commando Regiment and the Pasukan Gerakan Khas, supported by the United States Navy Air Fleet (from USS Jarrett (FFG-33)), Police General Operations Force Senoi Praaq, Police Air Wing, Fire and Rescue Department, Forestry Department Rangers, Malaysia Civil Defence Force and local villagers, were deployed in a search and rescue operation after a RMAF Sikorsky S61 'Nuri' helicopter went down with a crew of six near Genting Sempah, in the Genting Highlands. The SAR team located the wreckage on 17 July at 1324 hrs with its rotor blades detached. The bodies of all crew members were found in the cabin of the stricken aircraft.

=== MALCON-UNIFIL 2007 ===
RMAF Special Forces was part of a contingent which also included the 10th Parachute Brigade, 21st Special Service Group and PASKAL which were deployed to assist the administrative workload at the UN Interim Force in Lebanon (UNIFIL) headquarters in Lebanon which 160 soldiers including 3 Malaysian special forces as the Quick Reaction Team.

=== Hawk 208 crash ===
On 27 June 2006, RMAF Special Forces was involved in the search for Major Muhammad Rohaizan Abdul Rahman RMAF after his Hawk 208 fighter crashed into the sea off Rompin, Pahang on 31 May 2006. The remains of the pilot were found on the seabed 28 days after the crash, 150 metres (0.081 nmi) off the coast of Pantai Lanjut, Rompin, Pahang.

=== Mount Batu Tiban incident ===
RMAF Special Forces was involved in rescue operations on 28 July 2005, after a Hornbill Skyway Bell 206 Jet Ranger helicopter crashed in Bukit Batu Tiban (lit. 'Batu Tiban Hill' or 'Mount Batu Tiban'), Ulu Baleh, Kapit, near the Sarawak-West Kalimantan border. Three passengers and the pilot died, one passenger survived.

=== Brinchang incident ===
On 7 June 2005, 21 RMAF Special Forces and 35 VAT 69 of the Pasukan Gerakan Khas commandos were involved in the search for four children who were reported to be missing on Fraser's Hill as well as another two persons who were lost on Gunung Brinchang in the Cameron Highlands. They were all found three days later.

=== Piper 28 crash ===
RMAF Special Forces, together with the Department of Civil Aviation (DCA) and the 10th Parachute Brigade, were involved on 14 March 2004, in the search and rescue of the occupants of a civilian Piper 28 aircraft which had crashed. The aircraft went down in a heavily forested area 3.2 kilometres (2.0 mi) southwest of the Langat Dam, Selangor. The pilot, Captain Nasir Ma Lee Abdullah, was killed while the passenger, Nazarullah Mohd Sultan, was found alive.

=== PASKAU boat capsizing ===
On 19 January 2003, a fibreglass boat carrying two senior officers and four servicemen from RMAF Special Forces capsized after encountering large waves in stormy conditions. This occurred during reconnaissance operations in the vicinity of Sibu Island, Johor at around 10:30 am. Major Audrey Smith RMAF and Major Damian Sebastian RMAF, Sergeant Radzi Abdul Majid and Sergeant Saad Che Omar were safely recovered while Corporal Hasnul Abdul Rahman and Corporal Ayub Sidek perished.

=== Mount Galla incident ===
RMAF Special Air Service with RMP General Operations Force, the State Forestry Department, the Malaysia Civil Defence Force, the Department of Civil Aviation and the Fire and Rescue Department, were involved on 20 February 1999, in search and rescue operations after a civilian Beechcraft BE-36 aircraft crashed into the slopes of Bukit Galla (lit. 'Galla Hill' or 'Mount Galla'), Mantin, Negeri Sembilan. (Note: Western societies do not name lower elevated places as 'Hill'; instead, they refer to such locations as 'Mount'. For example, Mont-Saint-Michel in France and Mount Manisty in England are lower, elevated places named "Mount". Thus, this place can be known as Mount Galla in English.) The pilot and his passenger, Patrick Dutrey and Natalie Marie Chappate, were killed.

=== Mount Gerah incident ===
On 14 November 1989, Combat Air Rescue Team was involved in rescue operations after a RMAF Sikorsky S-61 'Nuri' helicopter went down on the slopes of Mount Gerah and Mount Bilah near the Kelantan-Perak border. 21 passengers were killed, including 15 policemen from the General Operations Force of the Royal Malaysia Police.

== Notable members ==
Despite being the youngest special forces unit in the Malaysian Armed Forces, the RMAF Special Forces has produced individuals who have left an indelible mark on history. Some of the notable members include:

- Mior Rosli – Major Hj. Mior Rosli bin Dato' Hj. Mior Mohd Jaafar RMAF (retired), known as the founding father of the RMAF Air and Ground Defence Force (HANDAU) and RMAF Special Forces, was the first officer commanding the unit. He played a pivotal role in draughting the foundation of RMAF HANDAU, which later evolved into the RMAF Special Forces. After retiring, he became a prominent activist, serving as the president of an NGO dedicated to defending the welfare of military veterans. In the political arena, he stood as an independent candidate for the P118 Setiawangsa parliamentary seat during Malaysia's 15th general election.
- Mustafa Omar – Colonel Muhammad Mustafa bin Omar RMAF has been the Commander of the RMAF Special Forces since July 2023. Initially trained as an aircraft engineer, he transitioned to become a special forces commando. He gained international recognition for his prominent role in Malaysia's Negotiation Team for MH17, where he was involved in examining the MH17 flight recorders, with his image featured in global news coverage.
- Muhamad Norazlan Aris – General Dato' Sri Muhamad Norazlan bin Aris RMAF is the current Chief of Air Force, having assumed the role on 26 June 2025. A career fighter pilot, he operated the Aermacchi MB339A, A-4PTM Skyhawk, MiG-29N/UB, and Sukhoi 30MKM, serving as a flight instructor for three of these aircraft types. Under the 2024 Malaysian Armed Forces Standard Quality Manual (SATM), pilots are classified as "special forces" personnel. Consequently, Norazlan volunteered for the pilot-to-commando conversion scheme between 28 August and 17 October 2025. Upon completion of this additional training, he became a fully qualified member of PASKAU and the first publicised military personnel to graduate from the conversion programme.
- Tengku Hassanal – Major Tengku Hassanal Ibrahim Alam Shah RMAF, the Crown Prince of Pahang, followed Malaysian royal tradition by entering military service and graduating from the Royal Military Academy Sandhurst in 2019. He initially served as an officer in a mechanised infantry battalion within the Malaysian Army before pursuing elite forces training, which included completing a basic sniper course at the Special Warfare Training Centre in 2021. In July 2025, he volunteered for the Basic PASKAU Commando Course Series 32/25. Upon the successful completion of the three-month programme on 26 October 2025, he graduated alongside 22 other personnel and was promoted to the rank of Major in the Royal Malaysian Air Force. His achievement made him the first immediate member of the Pahang Royal Family to qualify as a special forces commando.

== Lineage ==
1980s	1996 Merged	2002 Name change
Combat Rescue Team of the RMAF Ground and Air Defence Force	RMAF Special Air Service (Malay: Pasukan Khas Udara)	RMAF Special Forces (Malay: Pasukan Khas TUDM)
Rapid Deployment Force of the RMAF Ground and Air Defence Force	RMAF Special Air Service (Malay: Pasukan Khas Udara)	RMAF Special Forces (Malay: Pasukan Khas TUDM)

== Gallery ==
Insignias
Prior to the 2020 re-establishment of the RMAF Ground Defence Force, the RMAF Regiment insignia featured the RMAF Special Forces skill badge; this reflected the Special Forces' status as the sole constituent unit under the regiment's command at that time.

== See also ==
- French Air and Space Force
  - Air Parachute Commando No. 10
  - Air Parachute Commando No. 30
- Indonesian Air Force Quick Reaction Forces Corps
  - Bravo Detachment 90
- United Kingdom RAF Regiment
  - No. II Squadron RAF Regiment
- United States Air Force Special Operations Command
  - USAF Combat Control Team
  - USAF Pararescue
  - USAF Special Reconnaissance
  - USAF Deployed Aircraft Ground Response Element
- Elite Forces of Malaysia – List of other specialised unit in Malaysia
  - Malaysian Army 21st Special Service Group
  - Malaysian Army 10th Parachute Brigade
  - Royal Malaysian Navy Naval Special Forces
  - Malaysia Coast Guard Special Task and Rescue
  - Royal Malaysia Police Pasukan Gerakan Khas
