= 5040 =

5040 may refer to:

- 5040 (number), a number in the 5000s range
- A.D. 5040, a year in the 6th millennium CE
- 5040 BC, a year in the 6th millennium BC
- 5040 Rabinowitze, an asteroid in the Asteroid Belt, the 5040th asteroid registered
- Hawaii Route 5040, a state highway
- SIG GL 5040, a 40 mm grenade launcher
