= Camp Mahkota =

Army base operated by the Malaysian Army in Johor, Malaysia

- Kem Mahkota کيم مهکوتا
- Part of Kluang Garrison
- Kluang District, Johor; Near Kluang in Malaysia

Site information
- Type: Military base
- Owner: Ministry of Defence
- Operator: Malaysian Army
- Controlled by: 7th Infantry Brigade
- Open to the public: Yes (Note: To access Kluang Airport)
- Other site facilities: Kluang Airport; Air traffic control tower

Site history
- Built: 1939
- In use: 1942–present
- Battles/wars: World War II; Malayan campaign; Fall of Singapore; Malayan Emergency; Indonesia–Malaysia Confrontation; Communist insurgency in Malaysia (1968–1989)

Garrison information
- Garrison: Malaysian Army Aviation; 7th Infantry Brigade; Army Field Engineering Institute
- Occupants: 881st Army Aviation Regiment

Camp Mahkota (Malay: Kem Mahkota; Jawi: کيم مهکوتا) is a major Malaysian Army base situated in the Kluang District, Johor, Malaysia. The facility is located in close proximity to the Kluang town centre, approximately 80 kilometres (50 mi) north of Johor Bahru, and forms an integral part of the larger Kluang Garrison military installation. The base stands adjacent to Kluang Airport (ICAO: WMAP), which is classified by the Civil Aviation Authority of Malaysia (CAAM) as a civilian aerodrome with restricted usage; its operations are limited to helicopters and small-to-medium chartered or private aircraft owing to the condition of the grass airstrip.

The site was originally part of a golf course before the Second World War. The current Camp Mahkota is the result of a significant expansion of the older Kluang Airfield (or Kluang Airport) by British and Commonwealth forces, commencing in 1946 during the Malayan Emergency.

During its administration by Commonwealth forces, the specific army base within the facility was named the Balaclava Lines, and the entire military complex was often referred to by locals simply as the Camp Garrison, a shortened form of Kluang Garrison.

== History ==
=== Origin: Kluang Airfield during the Japanese occupation of Malaya ===
The present-day Camp Mahkota was established around the site of the former Kluang Airfield following a significant expansion by British forces after the Second World War to accommodate ground forces during the Malayan Emergency.

The history of the Kluang Airfield site began in 1939 when British forces in Malaya constructed a 1,000 yards (910 m) secondary grass airstrip near a golf course close to Kluang town (also spelt Keluang at the time). This strip was intended for emergency use by aircraft travelling to or from Singapore. In the same year, the British also established a more permanent installation, bearing the original name of Kluang Airfield, at Kahang, approximately 38 kilometres (24 mi) northwest of the current location.

Following the Japanese occupation of Malaya, the original Kluang Airfield in Kahang was converted into a Prisoner of War (POW) camp for Commonwealth POWs. These prisoners were subsequently forced into labour to construct a new airfield for the Imperial Japanese Army Air Service (IJAAS) at the current Camp Mahkota location.

Under the Imperial Japanese forces, a nearby hillside was flattened to extend the original grass airstrip from 1,000 yards (910 m) to 1,500 yards (1,400 m). They also constructed a second, hard-surface runway measuring 700 yards (640 m). Additionally, multiple hangars were built, with at least two remaining in use by Commonwealth forces until 1970. The new Kluang Airfield became one of the three major bases for the IJAAS in Malaya, alongside Kuantan (now the RMAF Kuantan Air Base and Sultan Haji Ahmad Shah Airport) and Seletar (now Seletar Airport).

=== British Reoccupation, Malayan Emergency and Kluang Garrison ===
Following the Japanese surrender in August 1945, Kluang Airfield was secured by British forces and initially occupied by the 1st Battalion, 1st Punjab Regiment (1/1 Punjab) of the British Indian Army. The airfield was subsequently converted into an army base. In 1946, it was designated as the headquarters for the British Army 5th Infantry Brigade following their return from occupation duties in Japan.

During the immediate post-war period, the Malayan Communist Party (MCP), which had been a British ally during the Second World War, exploited the two-week power vacuum prior to the full return of British administration. This interim period, characterised by widespread unrest, became known as the 14 Days Incident or locally as the Perang Parang Panjang (Long Machete War). Hostilities escalated into the Malayan Emergency following the assassination of three European estate managers in Sungai Siput, Perak.

Situated in the centre of the southern Malay Peninsula, Kluang became a strategic location for Commonwealth military operations. The airfield complex underwent significant expansion, including the construction of new infrastructure and technical installations to accommodate larger security forces. It was subsequently designated as the headquarters for the British 2nd Infantry Division. The original hangars were repurposed for vehicle repair and to house machinery. During this period, the wider facility was collectively known as the Kluang Garrison, while the army base situated adjacent to the airfield was named the Balaclava Lines, in tribute to the Battle of Balaclava (1854).

In 1950, the base saw further expansion in response to persistent communist insurgent activity in the region. The 63rd Gurkha Infantry Brigade and the Royal Navy Fleet Air Arm were stationed at the site. By this time, the Kluang Garrison housed a major joint military formation, comprising three infantry battalions, an armoured regiment, and various supporting arms. The main runway was returned to aviation use to serve a helicopter squadron from the Royal Navy Fleet Air Arm.

A dedicated cemetery was also established within the grounds, specifically for Gurkha soldiers of the British Army and their families who lost their lives during the Malayan Emergency. This cemetery also serves as the final resting place for several Gurkha veterans of the Second World War, honouring their defence of Malaya during the conflict.

=== Independence and the Indonesia–Malaysia confrontation ===
Following the independence of the Federation of Malaya in August 1957, several strategic military bases, including the Kluang Garrison, remained under the administration of Commonwealth forces. This presence was maintained to assist in the defence of the newly independent nation while the Malayan military capabilities were being developed. During the early 1960s, British military bases located within Kuala Lumpur were transferred to the Malayan Armed Forces. Consequently, Commonwealth units stationed in the capital were relocated to other camps, including Kluang. During this period, the garrison received No. 656 Squadron of the Army Air Corps (AAC), which operated from the airfield.

The formation of Malaysia in 1963 precipitated a military conflict with Indonesia known as the Indonesia–Malaysia confrontation. The state of Johor became a significant theatre of operations and was subjected to incursions by Indonesian paratroopers. Commonwealth units stationed at the Kluang Garrison were dispatched to intercept and neutralise these airborne forces. By 1966, as hostilities during the confrontation began to subside, Commonwealth forces initiated plans to transfer the control of Kluang Garrison to the Malaysian government.

=== Handover to Malaysia and the communist insurgency in Malaysia ===
In 1970, the British formally transferred control of the Kluang Garrison to the Malaysian government. The facility was subsequently partitioned and administered by two branches of the Malaysian Armed Forces (MAF):

- Malaysian Army: Took control of the land-based army facilities, including the Balaclava Lines and Camp Quetta. These were officially renamed Camp Mahkota and Camp Batu Lima, respectively.
- Royal Malaysian Air Force (RMAF): Assumed control of the airfield facilities, which were renamed RMAF Kluang Air Base.

The escalation of the Communist insurgency in Malaysia (which began in 1968) necessitated continuous readiness among Malaysian security forces, both military and police. Following the handover, the garrison received more military units, and new facilities were constructed.

The larger Kluang Garrison area was later further subdivided, with sections being handed over to other government departments. This transition, which included the transfer of older British Royal Engineers buildings, resulted in the present-day Camp Mahkota being smaller than the original Garrison. The British Military Hospital, Kluang, was transferred to the Ministry of Health and converted into a public hospital. This site today functions as a public health clinic known as Hospital Kluang Lama (Old Kluang Hospital), following the construction of a newer hospital approximately 6 kilometres (3.7 mi) from Camp Mahkota.

In July 1994, the RMAF Kluang Air Base was transferred from the administration of the RMAF to the Malaysian Army. Despite the change in command, RMAF personnel continued to operate on site, serving as pilots, crew, and instructors. The RMAF fully departed Kluang in 2015, and the air squadrons operating from the base became entirely staffed by personnel from the Malaysian Army.

== Tenant units ==
Camp Mahkota serves as the garrison for a diverse range of military units, including the following major formations:

=== Current ===
- 7th Infantry Brigade Headquarters (Malay: Markas Briged Infantri ke-7)
- Malaysian Army Aviation Headquarters (Malay: Markas Pasukan Udara Tentera Darat)
- 8th Field Engineering Squadron RAE (Malay: Skuadron ke-8 RAJD)
- 22nd Field Engineering Squadron (Territorial Army) RAE (Malay: Skuadron ke-22 (AW) RAJD)
- 2nd Artillery Regiment RA (Malay: Rejimen ke-2 Artileri Diraja)
- 33rd Artillery Regiment RA (Malay: Rejimen ke-33 Artileri Diraja)
- 61st Artillery Surveillance Regiment RA (Malay: Rejimen ke-61 Artileri Diraja)
- 881st Army Aviation Regiment (formerly No. 881 Squadron AAC) (Malay: Rejimen ke-881 PUTD)
- 2nd Medical Battalion, Royal Medicals (Malay: Batalion ke-2 Perubatan)
- 612th Artillery Surveillance Battery RA (Malay: Bateri ke-612 Pengesan)
- Army Field Engineering Institute (Malay: Institut Kejuruteraan Medan Tentera Darat)
- 809th Military Clinic, Royal Medicals (Malay: 809 Rumah Sakit Angkatan Tentera)

=== Past ===
- 3rd Air Army (1942–1945)
- 1st Battalion, 1st Punjab Regiment (1 Punjab) (1945–1946)
- 5th Infantry Brigade (1946–1970)
- 2nd Infantry Division (1947–1970)
- 63rd Gurkha Infantry Brigade (1950–1970)
- 848 Naval Air Squadron (1950–1963)
- 1st Battalion, 7th Duke of Edinburgh's Own Gurkha Rifles (1/7 Gurkha Rifles) (1950s–1970)
- 68 (Gurkha) Independent Field Squadron RE (1950s–1970) (present-day the 68 (Gurkha) Field Squadron)
- 70 (Gurkha) Field Squadron RE (1950s–1970) (present-day the 70 (Gurkha) Parachute Squadron)
- 75 (Malaya) Field Squadron RE (1950s–1970)
- 78 (Malaya) Field Squadron (Park) RE (1950s–1970)
- Far East Land Forces (FARELF) Engineer Training Centre (1950s–1970)
- No. 656 Squadron AAC (1963–1970)
- No. 10 Squadron RMAF (1970–2000s)
- No. 2 Flight Training School RMAF (1978–1994)

== Future plans ==
The Ministry of Defence initiated the construction of a new military polyclinic within Camp Mahkota in 2023. Construction is currently scheduled for completion as early as mid-December 2025. This polyclinic is designed to include a capacity of 25 beds, a haemodialysis centre, a surgeon's hall, and other ancillary medical facilities.

The Malaysian government has initiated the construction of a new army camp within the Kluang district, approximately 9 kilometres (5.6 mi) northeast of Camp Mahkota. Upon completion, the 8th Field Engineering Squadron RAE and the 33rd Artillery Regiment RA are scheduled to be relocated from Camp Mahkota to the new facility. This new camp is planned to be named Camp Paloh and will be integrated into the wider Kluang Garrison installation.

Additionally, the Ministry of Defence has commenced construction of new facilities within Camp Mahkota itself. These facilities are intended to serve as the main training centre for the National Service Training Programme (Program Latihan Khidmat Negara or PLKN) in the Southern West Malaysia Zone.
