= Malaysia's Negotiation Team for MH17 in Donetsk =

Team to recover items from crashed plane

The Malaysia's Negotiation Team for MH17 in Donetsk, popularly known as "The Dozen Persons", was a covert task force of 12 Malaysians representing the Malaysian government. Their mission was to negotiate with the authorities controlling the region in eastern Ukraine where Malaysia Airlines Flight 17 (MH17) was shot down on 17 July 2014.

Malaysia, maintaining neutrality and friendly relations with both NATO-aligned and pro-Russian factions, chose to operate independently in the war zone. This covert approach ensured the MH17 tragedy would not be used to further inflame the conflict. At the time of the incident, responsibility for the crash remained unclear.

== Background ==
The news of MH17's disappearance was officially relayed to its operator, Malaysia Airlines, by Ukrainian Air Traffic Control on 17 July 2014, at 10:15 p.m. Malaysian time, approximately three hours after the plane's departure from Amsterdam. Acting swiftly, Malaysia mobilised a delegation of over 133 government and diplomatic officials to investigate and recover the crash site in Hrabove, Donetsk. (Note: The MH17 tragedy marked the second major incident involving Malaysia Airlines within just nine months, following the disappearance of MH370 in March 2014. By the time MH17 occurred, Malaysia had already implemented protocols and had standby personnel ready to be deployed within 24 hours for such emergencies.) The delegation departed from Kuala Lumpur on 18 July and reached Kiev at 4 a.m. local Ukrainian time on 19 July, following a 13-hour flight.

Despite their arrival, the crash site presented significant challenges. Located in a war-torn region controlled by the pro-Russian Donetsk separatists, the area was fraught with danger, rendering immediate recovery efforts impossible.

Recognising the challenges, Malaysian Prime Minister Najib Razak contacted Russian President Vladimir Putin, seeking safe passage for the Malaysian delegation. Putin facilitated communication with Alexander Borodai, the leader of the separatist-controlled region. While Borodai assured safety within his territory, the issue of navigating between warring factions remained unresolved.

== Formation of the team ==
Prime Minister Najib Razak, operating from the National Security Council (NSC) command room, consulted senior officials, including Datuk Mohamed Thajudeen Abdul Wahab, the NSC Secretary General, to determine Malaysia's response to the MH17 crisis. Recognising the risks of deploying a large group, the NSC opted for a smaller covert team.

This covert approach aimed to ensure the team's safety while reducing the risk of foreign intelligence agencies infiltrating the operation, which could damage Malaysia's delicate relationship with the pro-Russian Donetsk separatists. Additionally, a covert strategy addressed concerns from the Ukrainian government, which opposed direct contact between Malaysian officials and the separatists. Such contact could have been perceived as Malaysia tacitly recognising the separatists as a legitimate sovereign entity.

Datuk Thajudeen recommended Lieutenant Colonel Mohd Sakri Hussin, an NSC officer already in Kiev, to lead the mission. During a meeting with other agency representatives in Kiev, Lieutenant Colonel Sakri was approached by Arif Baharom, the Prime Minister's representative, and was given direct instructions via telephone from both Thajudeen and Najib Razak to take command of the operation.

== Mission objectives ==
Lieutenant Colonel Sakri was assigned two primary tasks by Najib Razak:

- Retrieve the MH17's flight recorder.
- Recover and repatriate the remains of the MH17 crew and passengers, along with their belongings.

== Team members ==
Drawing on his recent experience in a plane crash recovery mission in the Philippines, Lieutenant Colonel Sakri identified four essential fields for the operation: security, pathology, medical, and communications. Additionally, he included a chaplain to provide religious support, particularly in case some remains had to be interred locally in Donetsk. (Note: Lieutenant Colonel Sakri had recently returned from assisting the Philippine government in a light aircraft search and rescue (SAR) operation. He was also deeply involved in the MH370 SAR efforts.)

The team members selected by Lieutenant Colonel Sakri included experts in each of these fields, each chosen for their specialised skills and ability to operate in high-risk environments.

MH17's The Dozen Persons
Name	Rank at the time	Services	Unit	Role
Mohd Sakri Hussin	Lieutenant Colonel	Malaysian Army	National Security Council	Mission commander & chief negotiator
Datuk Dr. Mohd Ilham Haron	Brigadier General	Malaysian Army	Royal Medical Corps	Odontologist (Note: Dr. Mohd Ilham's role was to identify the identities of the deceased by analysing dental records.)
Dr. Mohd Shah Mahmood	Public servant	Ministry of Health	Kuala Lumpur Hospital	Pathologist & Disaster Victim Identification (DVI)
Nazri Musman	Major	Malaysian Army	Military Religious Corps	Religious (chaplain) support
Dr. Mohd Hafizi Abdullah	Major	Malaysian Army	Royal Medical Corps	Medical doctor
Muhammad Mustafa Omar RMAF	Major	Royal Malaysian Air Force	RMAF Special Forces	Aircraft engineer & security personnel (Note: Major Muhammad Mustafa had a background in aircraft engineering, having worked in the field before transitioning to the special forces. During the MH17 mission, one of his critical responsibilities was to verify the authenticity of the flight recorders. He meticulously inspected them for signs of tampering, ensuring their integrity for the investigation.)
Dr. Mohd Zainizam Zainal	Captain	Malaysian Army	Royal Medical Corps	Interpreter & medical doctor (Note: Dr. Mohd Zainizam studied medicine at a university in Ukraine for seven years. His deep familiarity with the country, including its culture and language, made him an invaluable asset as the team's interpreter and medical officer during the mission.)
Abd Rahim Abd Aziz	Inspector	Royal Malaysia Police	Special Disaster Assistance and Rescue Team	Vehicle extrication specialist & the team's treasurer
Shahrizal Abu Bakar	Air Force Sergeant	Royal Malaysian Air Force	RMAF Special Forces	Security personnel & the team's head of security
Rosli Mustafa	Air Force Corporal	Royal Malaysian Air Force	RMAF Special Forces	Security personnel
Mohd Afendy Ahmad Zaini	Leading Aircraftman	Royal Malaysian Air Force	RMAF Special Forces	Security personnel
Rosli Shaari	Civilian		Sapura Group	Communications (Satellite) Specialist & Person-in-Charge of the Team Documentation (Note: Sapura, a large Malaysian technology company and service provider, manages the Malaysian government's communication networks. Rosli Shaari, a communication engineer from Sapura, was part of the mission to ensure uninterrupted communication throughout the operation.)

All members of the Dozen Persons task force were instructed by mission commander, Lieutenant Colonel Sakri, to pose as civilians for the duration of the mission. They were required to leave behind all weapons and military identification in Kiev, carrying only civilian clothing.

== The journey from Kiev to Donetsk ==
The journey from Kiev to Donetsk, which would typically take only a few hours, stretched into a gruelling two-day ordeal for the team due to the ongoing civil war. The team had to pass through twelve checkpoints. At each checkpoint, their credentials and purpose were scrutinised for approximately an hour, significantly delaying their progress. Their vehicle, a rented black Mercedes minivan, was struck several times by stray bullets and sniper fire during the journey.

=== Kiev to Kharkiv ===
To maintain secrecy, the Dozen Persons team rented a black minivan and began their journey under the cover of dusk, departing Kiev at 4 p.m. on 20 July 2014. For the first leg of the trip, from Kiev to Kharkiv, they hired two local Ukrainian drivers. Travelling cautiously to avoid drawing attention, they arrived in Kharkiv around 10 p.m., passing through two Ukrainian military and police checkpoints along the way. However, finding food for their suhur (pre-dawn meal during Ramadan) proved difficult, leaving them unable to secure provisions even by 2 a.m. (Note: MH17 crashed during the Muslim fasting month of Ramadan. Members of the Dozen Person continued fasting despite the challenging mission as a vow for their safety and to honour the victims of MH17 who perished.)

The following morning, as they prepared for the final leg of their journey, the team reflected on the risks ahead. Based on information from Captain Dr. Zainizam, their interpreter and a former medical student in Ukraine, they imagined the separatist forces as fierce and unpredictable mercenaries. Given the perceived peril, they took a group photo, symbolically treating it as a "last picture" in case their mission turned tragic. Due to the risks of the mission, they could find only one local driver willing to convey them from Kharkiv to Donetsk.

=== The route to Donetsk ===
As the team prepared to depart Kharkiv on the morning of 21 July, Lieutenant Colonel Sakri received alarming intelligence that their mission might have been compromised and that they were being followed. Despite recommendations to abandon the mission, the team unanimously decided to proceed, departing Kharkiv at 8 a.m. local time.

The journey from Kharkiv to Donetsk was fraught with challenges due to the ongoing civil war. Many roads were destroyed, requiring the team to rely on military intelligence provided to Lieutenant Colonel Sakri and guidance from locals to determine a viable route. Along the way, they encountered active combat zones, forcing them to detour through off-road paths, including forest trails, sunflower fields, and wheat fields, to avoid being caught in the crossfire.

During this leg of the journey, the team passed through 10 checkpoints: eight manned by Ukrainian military forces and two by separatists. At the ninth checkpoint, their covert mission was exposed when Ukrainian intelligence became aware of their presence. Lieutenant Colonel Sakri received direct orders from Ukrainian officials to turn back, along with warnings of "serious consequences" if they continued. Despite the threats, the team resolved to press forward with their mission.

=== Reaching Donetsk ===
At the separatist-controlled checkpoints, Lieutenant Colonel Sakri provided a secret passcode, which had been prearranged with the separatist leadership. Upon verification, the team was warmly received by the separatist forces. Their minivan was then escorted by separatist armoured vehicles to the headquarters in downtown Donetsk, marking the conclusion of their treacherous journey.

== Negotiation ==
The team arrived at the separatist headquarters on 21 July at approximately 2:40 p.m. and were directed to a conference room to prepare for the negotiation. After waiting for nearly two hours, Alexander Borodai, leader of the region where MH17 crashed, and his delegates arrived. Following a brief welcome briefing, Lieutenant Colonel Mohd Sakri Hussin and Captain Dr. Zainizam Zainal were summoned to a private office for the negotiation.

Initially, Captain Dr. Zainizam was denied entry. However, after a test of his fluency in Russian, he was permitted to participate. The closed-door negotiation involved four individuals:

- Lieutenant Colonel Mohd Sakri Hussin: Lead Malaysian negotiator
- Alexander Borodai: Leader of the separatist-controlled region where MH17 crashed
- Purgin Andre: Separatist official and Russian-English translator
- Captain Dr. Mohd Zainizam Zainal: Russian-English-Malay translator

Additionally, the negotiation was reportedly observed via telephone by someone Borodai referred to as "Mr. President".

The full details of the four-hour negotiation remain undisclosed. However, Lieutenant Colonel Sakri presented Malaysia's requests related to the MH17 incident:

1. Release of all victims' bodies to the Malaysian team.
2. Handover of the MH17 flight recorders to Malaysia.
3. Return of all victims' personal belongings to the Malaysian team.
4. Immediate access to the crash site for the Dozen Persons, along with future access for neutral parties endorsed by Malaysia.

While Borodai agreed to requests 1, 2, and 4, he rejected request 3. He explained that the explosion of MH17 in mid-air had scattered debris, including victims' personal belongings, across a vast area spanning more than 50 kilometres (31 mi) radius. Some items had likely been lost or taken, making full recovery impossible.

== Events after the negotiation ==
=== Press conferences and handover of MH17 flight recorders ===
The handover of the MH17 flight recorders took place on 22 July 2014, during a small press conference. The ceremony involved the exchange of documentation between Lieutenant Colonel Sakri, representing the Malaysian Government, and Purgin Andre, representing Donetsk authorities, with Alexander Borodai as a witness. The flight recorders were then inspected by Major Muhammad Mustafa Omar, a former aircraft engineer. Major Mustafa verified the serial numbers provided by Malaysia Airlines and checked the recorders for signs of tampering, such as attempts to open, damage, or replace them. After confirming their authenticity, the recorders were handed over to the security team of the Dozen Persons.

=== Transfer of victims' bodies ===
The victims' bodies had been stored in a cargo train by separatists and civilian volunteers in Donetsk since the second day of the crash. These efforts were overseen by a forensic team from the Netherlands. Any additional remains recovered later were also loaded onto the train, with assistance from members of the Dozen Persons.

=== Visit to the crash site ===
The Dozen Persons travelled to the MH17 crash site, accompanied by two armoured vehicles from separatist forces. However, while en route to a site near Torez, their convoy was intercepted by two unidentified fighter jets flying overhead. Concerned for safety, the team decided to cancel the visit and prioritised the timely transfer of the victims' remains to their families, as the bodies had begun to decompose.

== Return to Ukraine-controlled region ==
To ensure the MH17 flight recorders were not tampered with or exploited, the team requested Malaysia Airlines to fly them and the recorders out of Donetsk. Although Malaysia Airlines had a standby plane in the Netherlands, it could not receive clearance to land due to restrictions on civilian flights. The team then sought assistance from the Royal Malaysian Air Force (RMAF), which agreed to send a C-130 Hercules cargo plane. However, it would take 22 hours to arrive in the Donetsk area. To expedite the process, the team decided to travel with the flight recorders to Kharkiv using the same train carrying the victims' remains.

=== Departure from Donetsk ===
On the night of 22 July 2014, the Dozen Persons boarded the train carrying the victims' remains and departed from Donetsk.

Khairil Hilmi Mokhtar, the head of the Malaysian delegation for MH17 in Kiev, received intelligence at 2 a.m. from the Malaysian Defence Intelligence Organisation, quoting British MI5, that Lieutenant Colonel Sakri and his team had been ambushed and killed. This report proved false when communication with the team was re-established a few hours later.

=== Ambushes and attempts to confiscate the flight recorders ===
The team faced two ambushes during their journey. The first occurred near Donetsk, where snipers fired at them while boarding the train. The second happened near the Kharkiv train station when unknown forces stopped the train. The attackers fired upon them, but the security team aboard returned fire, allowing the train to continue even under attack.

Upon arrival in Kharkiv early in the morning, the team was greeted by the press, Ukrainian officials, the Malaysian Disaster Victim Identification (DVI) team, and Dutch representatives. After a brief ceremony handing over the victims’ bodies, the entire team was detained by Ukrainian police. They were approached by individuals claiming to represent agencies such as the FBI, CIA, and Ukrainian intelligence, demanding the flight recorders for inspection. The team insisted the recorders were not with them.

They were taken to an abandoned site resembling a tank depot, where a sergeant from the Dutch special forces approached Lieutenant Colonel Sakri, offering assistance. Sakri agreed to collaborate, and the Dutch forces provided armoured vehicles to transport the team and the recorders to a waiting Royal Netherlands Air Force plane at Kharkiv International Airport.

=== Inspection and departure ===
While en route to the airport in Kharkiv, their vehicle was blocked by Ukrainian military forces. The team reluctantly allowed the recorders to be inspected under the supervision of Dutch and Malaysian special forces. After verifying the recorders, the team was allowed to proceed.

The Dozen Persons then split into two groups. Major Mustafa and one other team member transported the flight recorders to Kharkiv airport. They boarded a Dutch military plane to Kiev, where the recorders were handed over to the Air Accidents Investigation Branch (AAIB) from the United Kingdom, appointed by the Malaysian government. The AAIB, accompanied by representatives from Malaysia's Department of Civil Aviation (now the Civil Aviation Authority of Malaysia), flew directly to London that day. The victims' remains were transported separately to Amsterdam for identification.

=== Return to Malaysia ===
On 26 July 2014, 65 of the 133 Malaysian officials deployed to Kiev on 18 July returned to Malaysia, including Major Mustafa and Captain Dr. Zainizam. Other members of the Dozen Persons remained in the Netherlands to assist with identifying, managing, and transporting the victims' remains.

== Successor team ==
=== MH17 Joint Investigation Team ===
The establishment of the MH17 Joint Investigation Team (JIT) was initiated on 1 August 2014, following a meeting in Amsterdam between Malaysian Prime Minister Najib Razak and Dutch Prime Minister Mark Rutte. On the same day, they requested a ceasefire and safe passage to the crash sites from separatist forces.

On 3 August 2014, a team of 68 police officers from the Royal Malaysia Police's forensic unit, along with Dutch counterparts, travelled to Donetsk as part of a Netherlands-Malaysia joint investigation effort. The Netherlands advocated for Ukraine's inclusion in the JIT since the incident occurred within Ukrainian territory. To ensure the investigation remained independent and impartial, Belgium and Australia were also invited to join.

The JIT was officially established on 7 August 2014, with law enforcement representatives from five nations. Some team members remained in Ukraine to continue the investigation until February 2022. The investigation was suspended in February 2023, and the JIT was subsequently disbanded.

== Responses to the team ==
The diplomatic efforts led by Najib Razak and the bravery of the Dozen Persons team in securing the MH17 negotiation received both praise and criticism.

Western media outlets such as TIME and The New York Times commended the mission, highlighting its success in a challenging and volatile situation. CNN expressed scepticism, questioning whether the mission could truly be deemed a success. They criticised the Malaysian government's neutral stance after the MH17 tragedy, arguing that it should have taken a more assertive approach instead of relying solely on diplomacy.

Gerhard Hoffstaedter, an anthropology lecturer at the University of Queensland in Australia, echoed these criticisms. Speaking to CNN, Hoffstaedter dismissed Najib Razak's efforts as a desperate attempt to boost his political popularity. Najib was already under significant pressure from opposition leader Anwar Ibrahim, especially following the MH370 tragedy nine months earlier, and was facing one of the lowest points in his political career. (Note: Anwar Ibrahim, the opposition leader at the time, shifted the blame for the MH370 disappearance onto the Malaysian government. The captain of MH370, Zaharie Ahmad Shah, was known to be a supporter of Anwar Ibrahim. Adding to the scrutiny, Zaharie was also revealed to have family ties with Anwar through his daughter-in-law, intensifying speculation and political controversy surrounding the tragedy.) Hoffstaedter argued that the negotiation process, which took several days, conflicted with Islamic customs requiring prompt burial after death and could anger Muslim communities. He also criticised the Dozen Persons team's inability to recover all the victims' bodies (two of the 298 passengers' and crews' bodies could not be found). (Note: According to an official report from the Netherlands government, out of the 298 passengers and crew aboard MH17, two individuals remain missing and could not be identified.)

In contrast, Malaysian political analyst Wan Saiful Wan Jan defended Najib Razak's diplomatic approach. He highlighted Najib's track record in resolving international issues through negotiation, citing his role in facilitating a peace treaty between the Philippine government and Muslim separatist groups in the southern Philippines. Wan Saiful argued that Najib's success in this instance demonstrated his skill in diplomacy. He added that had an aggressive approach been taken, none of the victims' bodies may have been recovered and returned.
