= Kluang Airport =

Civilian airport in Kluang, Johor, operated by the Malaysian Army

- Lapangan Terbang Kluang
- Part of Kluang Garrison
- Kluang District, Johor; Near Kluang in Malaysia
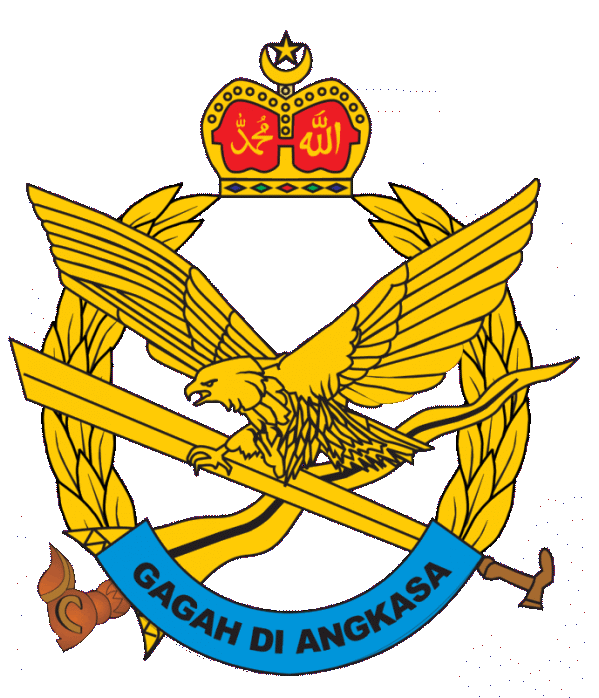
- Logo of Malaysian Army Aviation

Site information
- Owner: Ministry of Defence
- Operator: Malaysian Army
- Controlled by: Malaysian Army Aviation
- Open to the public: Yes

Location
- Location in West Malaysia
- Coordinates: 02°02′38″N 103°18′27″E

Site history
- Built: 1939
- In use: 1942–present
- Battles/wars: World War II; Malayan campaign; Fall of Singapore; Malayan Emergency; Indonesia–Malaysia Confrontation; Communist insurgency in Malaysia (1968–1989)

Airfield information
- Identifiers: ICAO: WMAP
- Elevation: 142 feet (43 m) AMSL
Runways
Direction	Length and surface
05/23	1,250 metres (4,101 ft) Grass
Helipads
Number	Length and surface
4	600 metres (1,969 ft) Concrete
- Airport terminal: 1

Kluang Airport (ICAO: WMAP), also known historically as Kluang Airfield and RMAF Kluang Air Base, is an aerodrome situated within the Kluang District, Johor, Malaysia. The facility is located in close proximity to the Kluang town centre, approximately 80 kilometres (50 mi) north of Johor Bahru, forming an integral part of the larger Kluang Garrison military installation. The facility possesses a single terminal, a grass airstrip, and concrete runways that have been converted for use as helipads. Located adjacent to Camp Mahkota, the aerodrome is officially operated and controlled by the Malaysian Army. Specifically, the air operations are managed by the 881st Army Aviation Regiment (Rejimen 881 PUTD) of the Malaysian Army Aviation (Pasukan Udara Tentera Darat or PUTD).

The aerodrome is currently listed by the Civil Aviation Authority of Malaysia (CAAM) as public but restricted. This status is primarily due to the condition of the grass surface, which currently limits its use exclusively to helicopters. It does not service scheduled commercial airline destinations but remains available for use by small-to-medium chartered or private aircraft.

Historically, the aerodrome did receive domestic commercial airline services in the early 1970s. However, commercial operations ceased in 1974, with the services subsequently being taken over and consolidated at Senai International Airport.

Historically, two airfields have shared the name Kluang. A second, older airfield was located in Kahang, approximately 38 kilometres (24 mi) northwest of the current site. This location was decommissioned after the Second World War and subsequently converted into a Prisoner-of-War (POW) camp by the Imperial Japanese Army for Commonwealth troops.

== History ==
=== Origin: RAF Kluang in Kahang ===
The original airfield bearing the name Kluang was situated in Kahang, also within the Kluang District. Located approximately 38 kilometres (24 mi) northeast of the current site, it was accessible via the Malaysia Federal Route 50 (Jalan Batu Pahat–Kluang–Mersing).

Constructed in the late 1930s for the Royal Air Force (RAF), the airfield garrisoned a Lockheed Hudson bomber squadron of the Royal Australian Air Force (RAAF) and served as a storage depot for bombs, explosives, and ammunition for Commonwealth forces. Security for the facility was provided by Australian troops alongside the Johor Military Force (JMF).

During this period, the site of the present-day Kluang Airport functioned as a secondary 1,000 yards (910 m) RAF grass landing ground situated within a golf course. It was utilised primarily for emergency landings by aircraft operating to and from Singapore.

Following the capture of the Kahang airfield by the Imperial Japanese Army in 1942, the facility became a major airbase for the Imperial Japanese Army Air Service (IJAAS) during the campaign against Singapore. Once the Japanese occupation of Malaya was complete, the Kahang site was converted into a prisoner-of-war (POW) camp for Commonwealth troops. The Japanese forces subsequently utilised POW labour to develop the former secondary landing strip into the new Kluang airfield.

=== New Kluang Airfield under Japanese Control ===
During the Japanese occupation of Malaya, forced labour, primarily from Commonwealth troops, was utilised for the construction and expansion of the new Kluang Airfield at its current site.

The Imperial Japanese forces flattened a nearby hillside, extending the original runway from 1,000 yards (910 m) to 1,500 yards (1,400 m). They also constructed a new, second hard-surface runway measuring 700 yards (640 m). Additionally, multiple hangars were built, with at least two remaining in use by Commonwealth forces until 1970.

The new Kluang Airfield became one of the three major bases for IJAAS in Malaya, alongside Kuantan (now the RMAF Kuantan Air Base and Sultan Haji Ahmad Shah Airport) and Seletar (now Seletar Airport).

=== Kluang Airfield and Conversion to Army Base under British Forces ===
Following the Japanese surrender in August 1945, the Kluang Airfield was taken over by British forces and occupied by the 1st Battalion of the 1st Punjab Regiment (1/1 PUNJAB) of the British Indian Army. The airfield was subsequently converted into an army military base, and in 1946, it became the headquarters of the British Army 5th Infantry Brigade, which had recently returned from occupational duties in Japan.

In 1947, as conflicts heightened that later became known as the Malayan Emergency, the base was designated as the headquarters for the British 2nd Infantry Division. During this period, the base underwent significant expansion and major improvements, including new infrastructure, technical installations, and buildings. The original hangars of the airfield were repurposed for vehicle repair and housing machinery, marking its establishment as the Kluang Garrison.

By 1950, Kluang had become a centre for Communist terrorist activities in the southern Malay Peninsula. In response, the base was again expanded to accommodate the 63rd Gurkha Infantry Brigade, which was stationed there. At this time, the Kluang military base housed a major joint military formation, including three infantry battalions, an armoured regiment, and various supporting arms. The main runway served a helicopter squadron from the Royal Navy Fleet Air Arm.

==== Kluang Gurkha Cemetery ====
A Commonwealth War Grave, formally known as the Kluang Gurkha Cemetery, was established just southwest of the runways. This site is dedicated specifically to Gurkha soldiers of the British Army and their families who fell during the Malayan Emergency. The cemetery also serves as the final resting place for several Gurkha veterans from the Second World War, honouring those who defended Malaya during that conflict.

=== Malayan independence ===
Following Malaya's independence from the United Kingdom in August 1957, Commonwealth forces maintained a presence to assist in building and defending the newly independent nation. Several existing military bases in Malaya, including Kluang Garrison, remained under the control of Commonwealth forces, though a few support units from the Federation of Malaya Army were subsequently stationed inside the base.

One of the existing British Royal Electrical and Mechanical Engineers (REME) workshops was converted into a training centre to train Malayan Army personnel. This training centre is now known as the Army Field Engineering Institute (Malay: Institut Kejuruteraan Medan Tentera Darat or IKEM).

=== Reversion to airport ===
In the early 1960s, the British fully handed over its Noble-Field military base in Sungei Besi, Kuala Lumpur, to the Malayan Army. Consequently, the British No. 656 Squadron AAC was relocated from Kuala Lumpur to Kluang. The existing World War II-era runways were subsequently reutilised, and the Kluang Garrison once again became an operational airfield, functioning as an army base that housed both land forces and air arms.

In addition to its military usage, the airfield also served the public. The Singapore Flying Club utilised its runways during weekends for recreational flights and flight school activities.

=== Handover to Malaysian Control ===
In 1970, the British formally handed over the Kluang Garrison to Malaysia. The facility was subsequently divided between two branches of the Malaysian Armed Forces:

- Malaysian Army: Controlled the land-based army facilities, which were officially renamed Camp Mahkota.
- Royal Malaysian Air Force (RMAF): Controlled the airfield facilities, which were renamed RMAF Kluang Air Base.

During this initial period, the existing hard-surface runway was converted into a dedicated heliport, and an RMAF helicopter squadron began operating from the base. This squadron provided air support for Malaysian Army operations. The runways and terminal were simultaneously shared for commercial use while the nearby Senai Airport was awaiting completion.

==== No. 2 Flight Training School ====
In 1978, RMAF established a dedicated training centre for helicopters at the base. This facility is officially known as the No. 2 Flight Training School RMAF (Malay: No. 2 Pusat Latihan Penerbangan or Pulatibang II). The training centre serves a dual role, functioning both as a flight school and as an aviation engineering training centre.

=== Army Aviation Establishment ===
In July 1994, the Malaysian Army Air Corps (Malaysia AAC, now known as Malaysian Army Aviation) was established at the base. This establishment was conducted both as a tribute to the British Army Air Corps that operated there in the 1960s and to facilitate the phased transition of the base and helicopter support duties from the RMAF to the Army. Concurrently, the No. 2 Flight Training School RMAF (Pulatibang II) was relocated from Kluang to RMAF Alor Setar Air Base.

The phased handover proceeded as follows:

- 9 January 1996: Overall management of the airfield was officially transferred from the RMAF to the Malaysia AAC. However, RMAF personnel initially remained on site, serving as pilots, crews, and instructors.
- 2015: The RMAF fully departed Kluang, and the air squadrons operating at the base became fully staffed by pilots, crew, and other personnel from the Malaysian Army.

== Air units operated here ==
List of current and former garrisoned and operating units:

=== Current ===
- 881st Army Aviation Regiment (formerly Malaysian No. 881 Squadron AAC)
- 883rd Army Aviation Regiment (formerly Malaysian No. 883 Squadron AAC)

=== Former ===
==== Military ====
- Japanese 3rd Air Army (during World War II)
- British 848 Naval Air Squadron (during Malayan Emergency)
- British No. 656 Squadron AAC (during Indonesia–Malaysia Confrontation)
- No. 10 Squadron RMAF (during Malaysian Communist Insurgency)
- No. 2 Flight Training School RMAF (Bell 47G training helicopter fleet)

==== Civilian ====
- Singapore Flying Club

== See also ==
- List of airports in Malaysia
