= United States Air Force Deployed Aircraft Ground Response Element =

US Air Force unit

Deployed Aircraft Ground Response Element
- Founded: 2007; 19 years ago
- Country: United States
- Branch: United States Air Force
- Type: Security forces
- Role: Rapid deployment force; Force protection; Close protection
- Part of: Air Force Special Operations Command
- Nickname: Air Commando
- Motto: Exsupero Aude (Latin for "Dare to Surpass"

The United States Air Force Deployed Aircraft Ground Response Element (Abbr.: DAGRE, pronounced 'dagger') is an elite, specialized security force unit.

They are under the Air Force Special Operations Command (AFSOC), but they are not part of the United States Air Force Special Tactics Squadrons. Instead, they have their own squadrons, the United States Air Force Special Operations Security Forces Squadrons.

The USAF DAGRE and the Air Force Office of Special Investigations Anti-terrorism Specialty Teams (AFOSI AST) are the only two units in the United States Air Force specifically trained as SWAT teams.

== Element ==
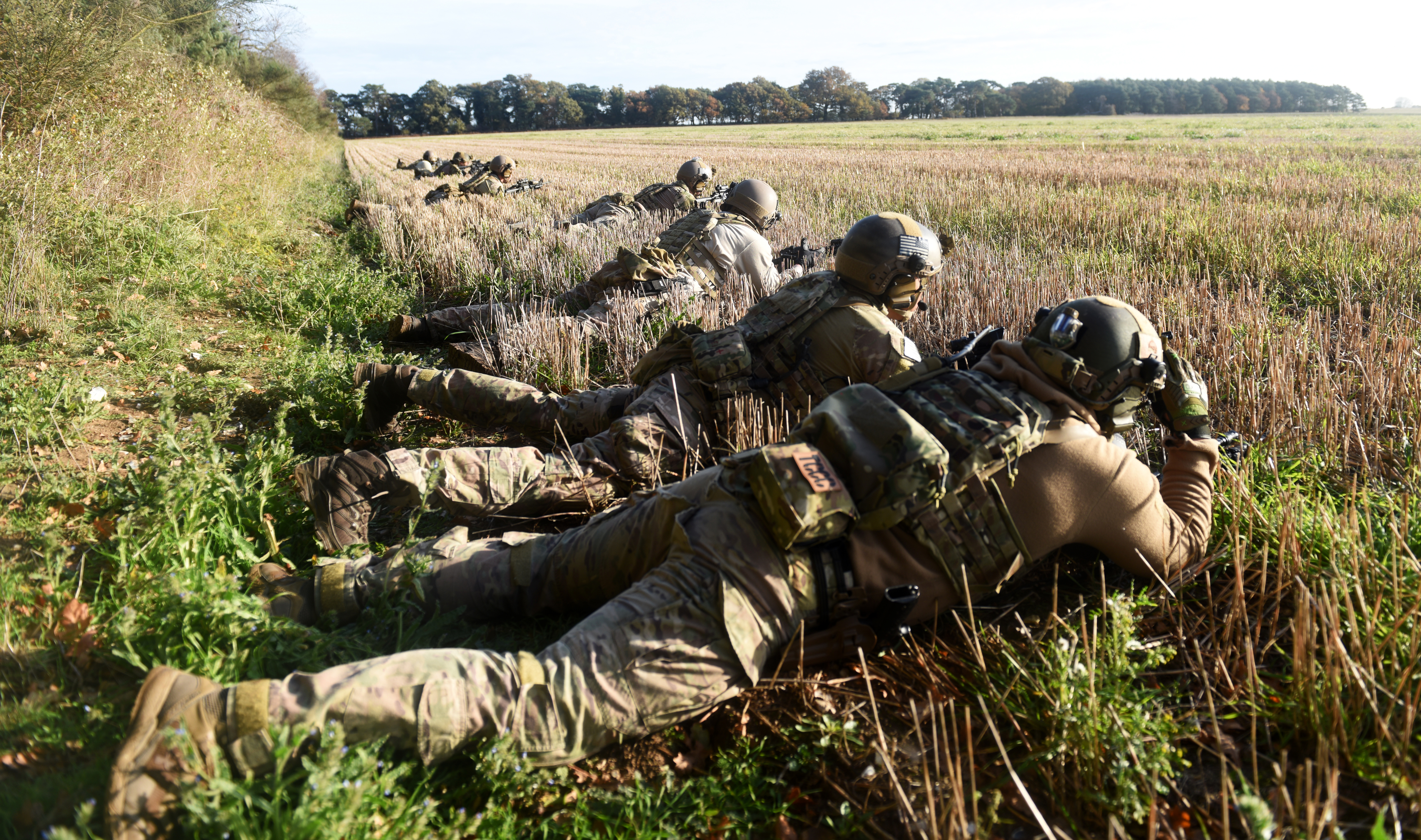
Element conducts field training exercise conducting field reconnaissance to apprehending a high-valued target and a hostage rescue

The Unit Type Code for DAGRE is QFM1C, and the basic element of QFM1C consists of five airmen.

== Mission ==
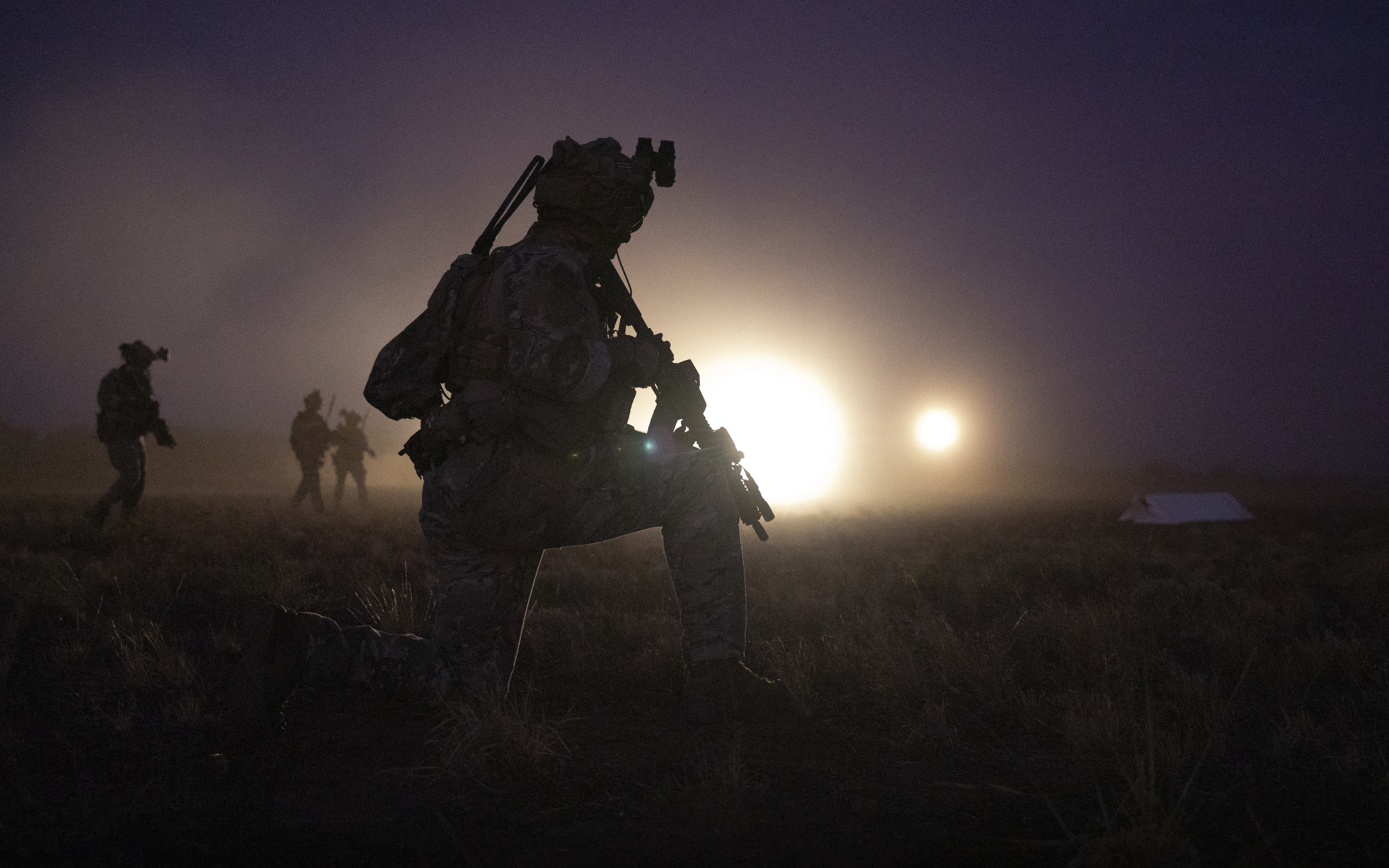
DAGRE personnel with the 353rd Special Operations Support Squadron conduct FARP training

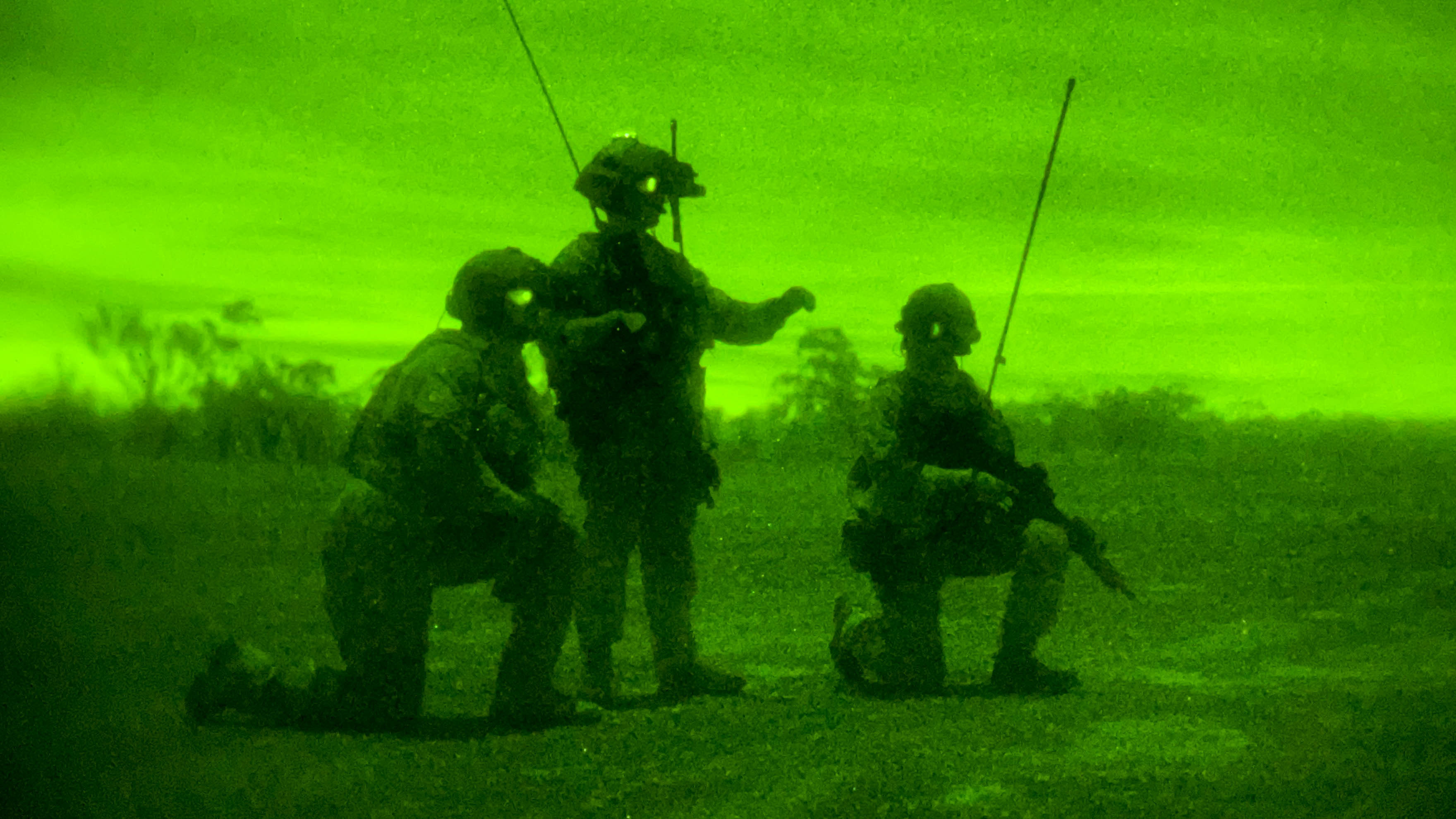
DAGRE during Exercise Talisman Sabre 21

According to Air Force Special Operations Command Instruction 31-100 (AFSOCI 31-100), QFM1C duties include:

- Rapid deployment
- Guarding USSOCOM and AFSOC assets and aircraft on the ground
- Countering local threats (counter-terrorism)
- Advising the mission commander on force protection strategies
- Conducting field reconnaissance
- Providing close protection

QFM1C DAGRE is also tasked with assessing and interacting with other in-place Department of Defense agencies and host nation defense forces, as well as coordinating with the Air Force Office of Special Investigations during transit or upon reaching their destination.

During an interview with Business Insider in 2023, it was revealed that DAGREs now also take part in raiding and securing airfields from opposing forces. When guarding airbases, DAGREs are the outermost security forces, conducting surveillance outside the airbases.

== Assigned units ==
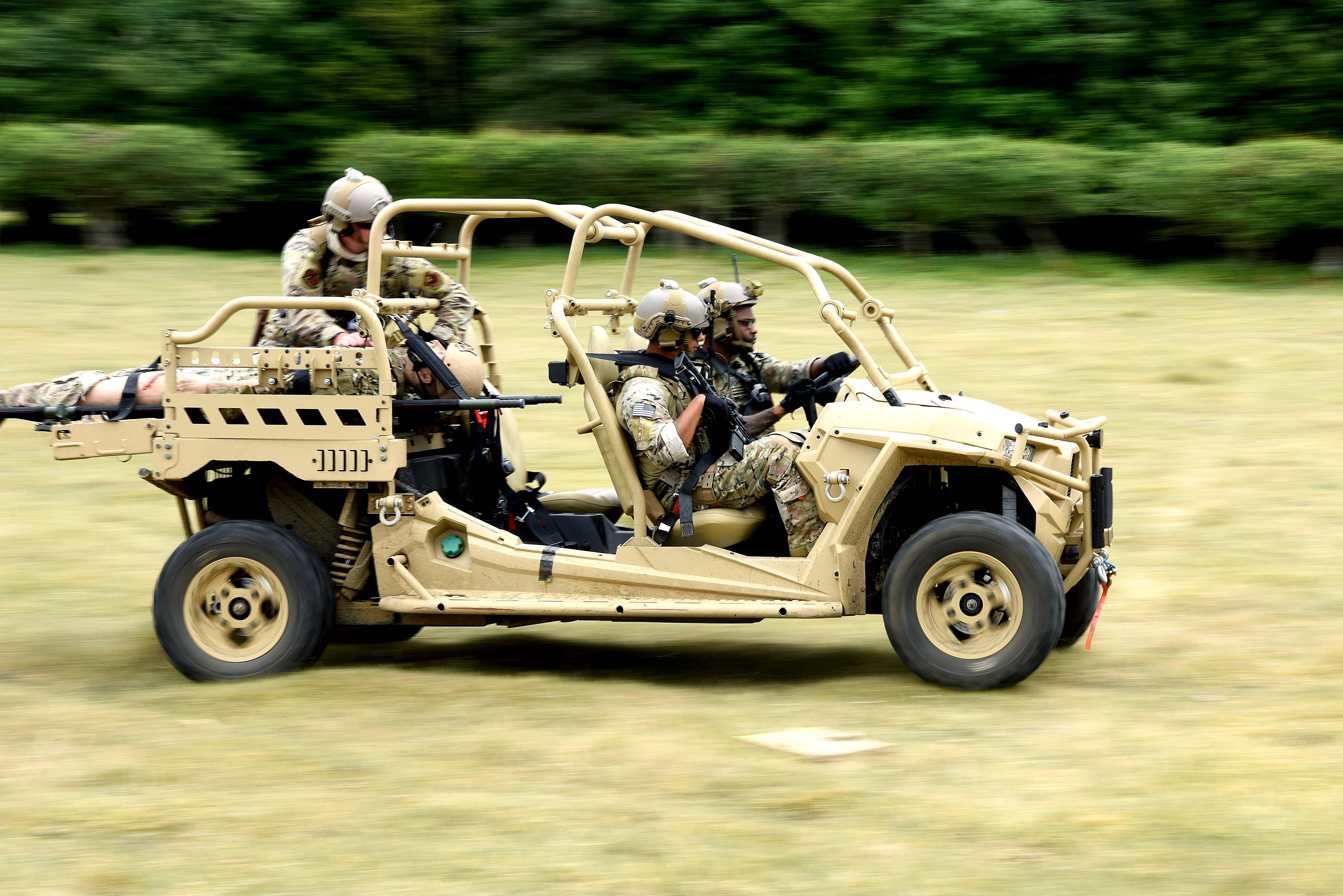
Air Commandos perform a ground casualty evacuation scenario during a readiness exercise near RAF Mildenhall, England

Currently, most DAGRE airmen are assigned to three Special Operations Security Forces squadrons within the Air Force Special Operations Command. Additionally, they are embedded with other special operations wings and special operations forces.

Active Duty units

- Air Force Special Operations Command, Hurlburt Field, Florida
  - 1st Special Operations Wing, Hurlburt Field, Florida
    - 1st Special Operations Security Forces Squadron
  - 27th Special Operations Wing, Cannon Air Force Base, New Mexico
    - 27th Special Operations Security Forces Squadron

Air Force Reserve units

- 919th Special Operations Wing, Duke Field, Florida
  - 919th Special Operations Security Forces Squadron

== Selection and training ==
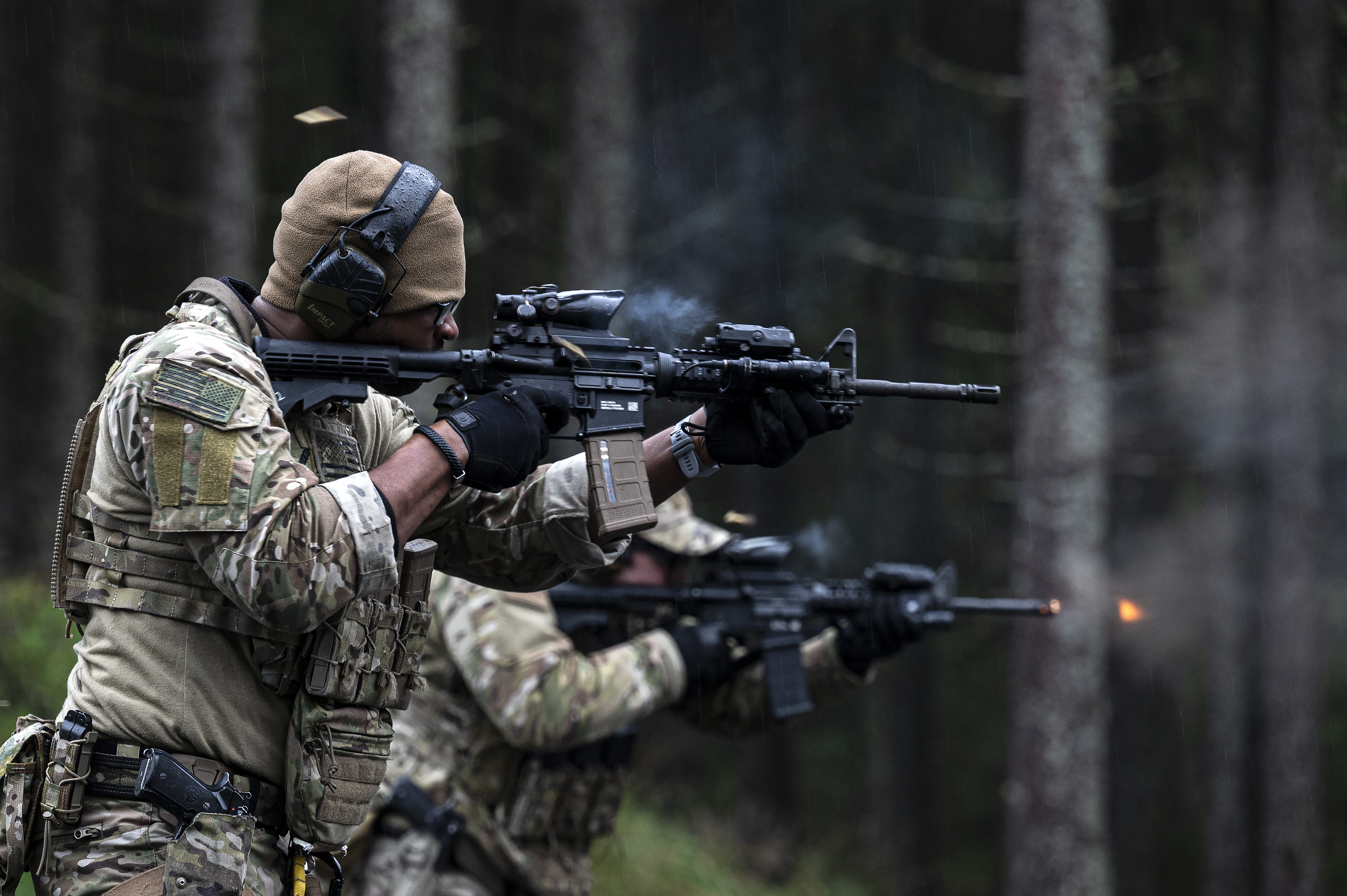
(DAGRE) with the 352d Special Operations Wing demos firing drills for Swedish Air Force members

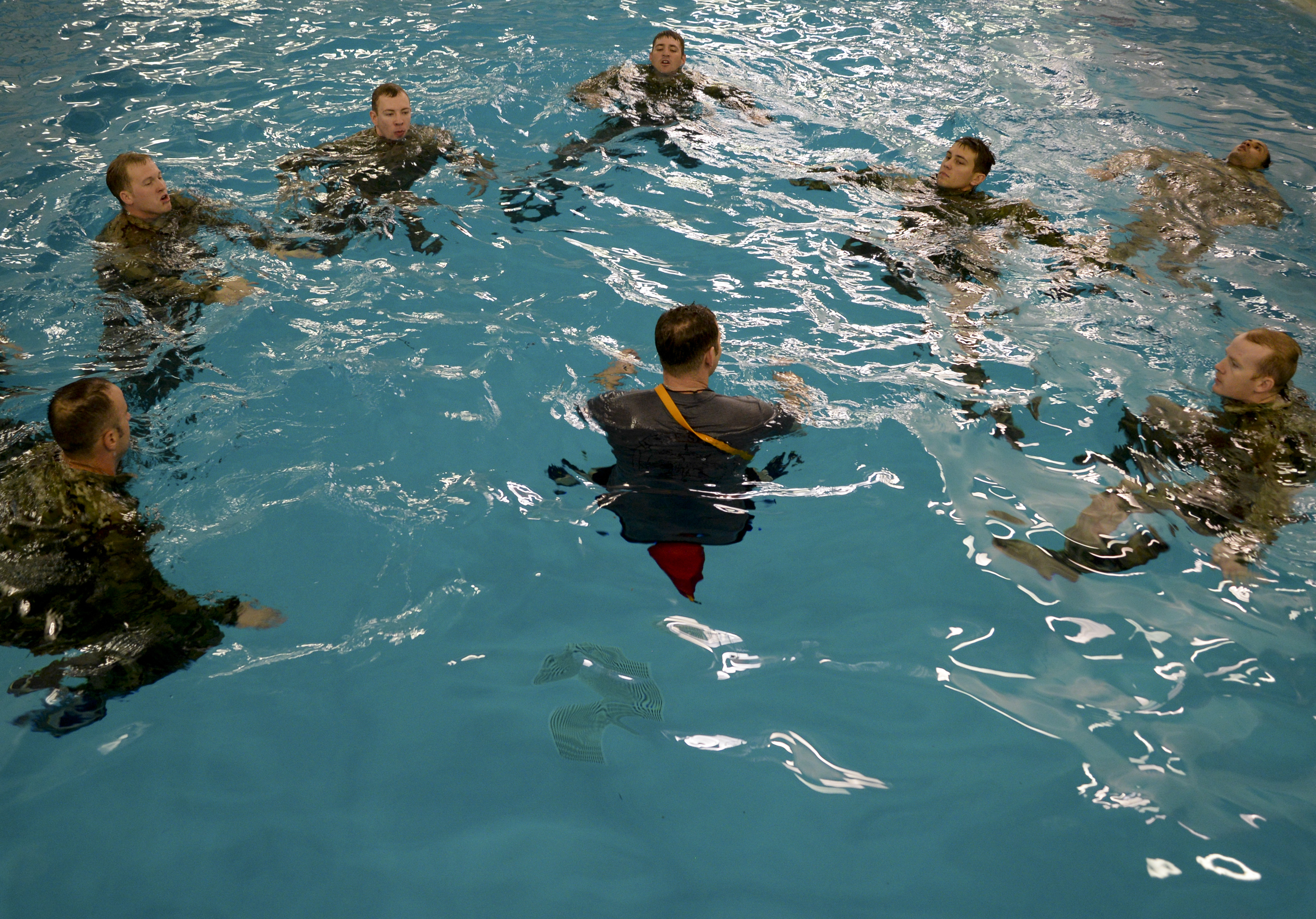
DAGRE members water survival training for SERE

The USAF DAGRE selection process is only open to enlisted airmen from the USAF Security Forces. Candidates must go through DAGRE tryouts and complete the DAGRE pipeline before receiving their DAGRE qualification. The 371st Special Operations Combat Training Squadron conducted the DAGRE pipeline training at Hurlburt Field in Florida.

=== DAGRE tryouts (3 days) ===
During these 3-day tryouts, candidates undergo testing on physical endurance, obstacle courses, communication skills, and tactical lessons.

=== DAGRE Pipeline (11 weeks) ===
Candidates need to complete seven courses within the 11-week pipeline. The courses are as follows:

Leadership Course

This course provides candidates with the knowledge and skills to plan and lead special operations forces during deployed operations.

Tactical Communication Course

This course provides candidates with the knowledge to operate radios and encryption devices.

Fly-Away Security Course

The course teaches fly-away security procedures. However, it is not equivalent to the United States Air Force Phoenix Raven Qualification (329 SEI). (Note: The USAF Phoenix Raven is another elite unit within the USAF Security Forces. However, the Phoenix Raven is attached to the Air Mobility Command, unlike the USAF DAGRE, which falls under the Air Force Special Operations Command.)

Combative Security Course

Candidates are required to successfully complete the U.S. Army Level 1 Combatives Course.

Tactics Security Course

This course teaches candidates the fundamentals of small unit tactics, tactical combat casualty care, and land navigation. It also serves as a prerequisite for the subsequent courses.

Tactical Vehicle Operations Security Course

The course instructs candidates on advanced vehicle inspections and operations in high-threat conditions across different vehicle types. Candidates need to learn both as drivers and passengers of these vehicles and go through several exercises such as dynamic driving skills, driving under fire, counter ambush, mounted operations, engaging targets from a moving vehicle, and IED recognition.

DAGRE Qualification Course

Candidates undergo a 3-week course during which they are tested on their knowledge from previous courses. They also need to undergo a Special Operations Forces (SOF) tactical leadership test and a SOF physical test.
