= Royal Medical Corps (Malaysia) =

- Country: Malaysia
- Branch: Malaysian Army
- Motto: Khidmat Diutamakan (Service First)
- Anniversaries: 11 May 1967; 59 years ago

Royal Medical Corps (RMC) is an organization responsible for providing quality health and dental services to all members of the Malaysian Armed Forces (MAF). RMC is among the service aid groups that help combat and combat aid groups in the aspect of providing health services.

The development of the health and dental services of the armed forces saw the establishment of medical units such as the armed forces hospital, the armed forces medical center and the armed forces dental center throughout the country. RMC also goes through a training institution at Camp Terendak, which is the Armed Forces Health Training Institute which serves to train members and officers before serving in their respective units.

In addition, the involvement of RMC through corporate social responsibility projects has been able to help the government in implementing national development plans. The devotional service of health and dental services continues to thrive with RMC's involvement in the mission of the United Nations (UN) and humanitarian aid for the sake of peace and universal human well-being. RMC also has its own team in the Quick Response Force (QRF) and also the Commando with the establishment of the Para Medical Company and also 21 Commando Medics. The establishment of this team is to provide medical support in the QRF on the front line.

== History ==
The history of the RMC begins as early as the history of the armed forces' struggle to defend national sovereignty after the First World War. The threat of confrontation and involvement in the War Against Insurgency contributed to the establishment of the General Service Corps (Medicine) in 1960. The history of the Army Health Service (PKAT) was engraved when the Medical and Dental Corps (KUG) was officially established on May 11, 1967. Evolution continued to grow with the change of designation to the Armed Forces Health Corps (KKAT) on 10 August 1988. The awarding of the Royal Title by His Majesty the Yang DiPertuan Agong on 7 June 1997 was a national recognition of the service and sacrifice of Corps members to the nation and the country. The motto of the Royal Health Corps is Service First.

== Mission ==
KKD has at least carried out more than hundreds of thousands of operations involving military campaigns, peacekeeping missions and natural disasters at home and abroad and the following is a list of the involved missions that KKD members succeeded in:

=== Domestic ===
- Darurat Tanah Melayu (1948-1960)
- Konfrontasi Indonesia-Malaysia (1963-1966)
- Peristiwa 13 Mei (1969)
- Insurgensi komunis di Sarawak (1970-1988)
- Insurgensi komunis di Semenajung (1968-1989)
- Banjir di Semenajung (1971, 2006, 2009, 2010, 2014 & 2020-21, 2022)
- OPS Daulat (2013)
- OPS Pasir (2002-sekarang)
- Tragedi Highland Towers (1993)
- Letupan Bright Sparkles (1991)
- Ribut Tropika Greg (1996)
- Perintah Kawalan Pergerakan Malaysia 2020-2021 (OPS Penawar)

=== International ===
- Congo (1961-1963)
- Namibia (1988-1989)
- Kemboja (1992-1993)
- Bosnia Herzegovina (1993-1997)
- Somalia (1993-1995)
- Lubnan (2007-sekarang)
- Turki (2023)
- Misi kemanusiaan di Sempadan Pakistan-Afghanistan (2002)
- Gempa bumi di Kashmir (2004)
- Timor Leste (2006-2007)
- Misi ISAF khas di Bamiyan, Afghanistan (2011-2014)
