= SIG GL 5040 =

GLG 5040
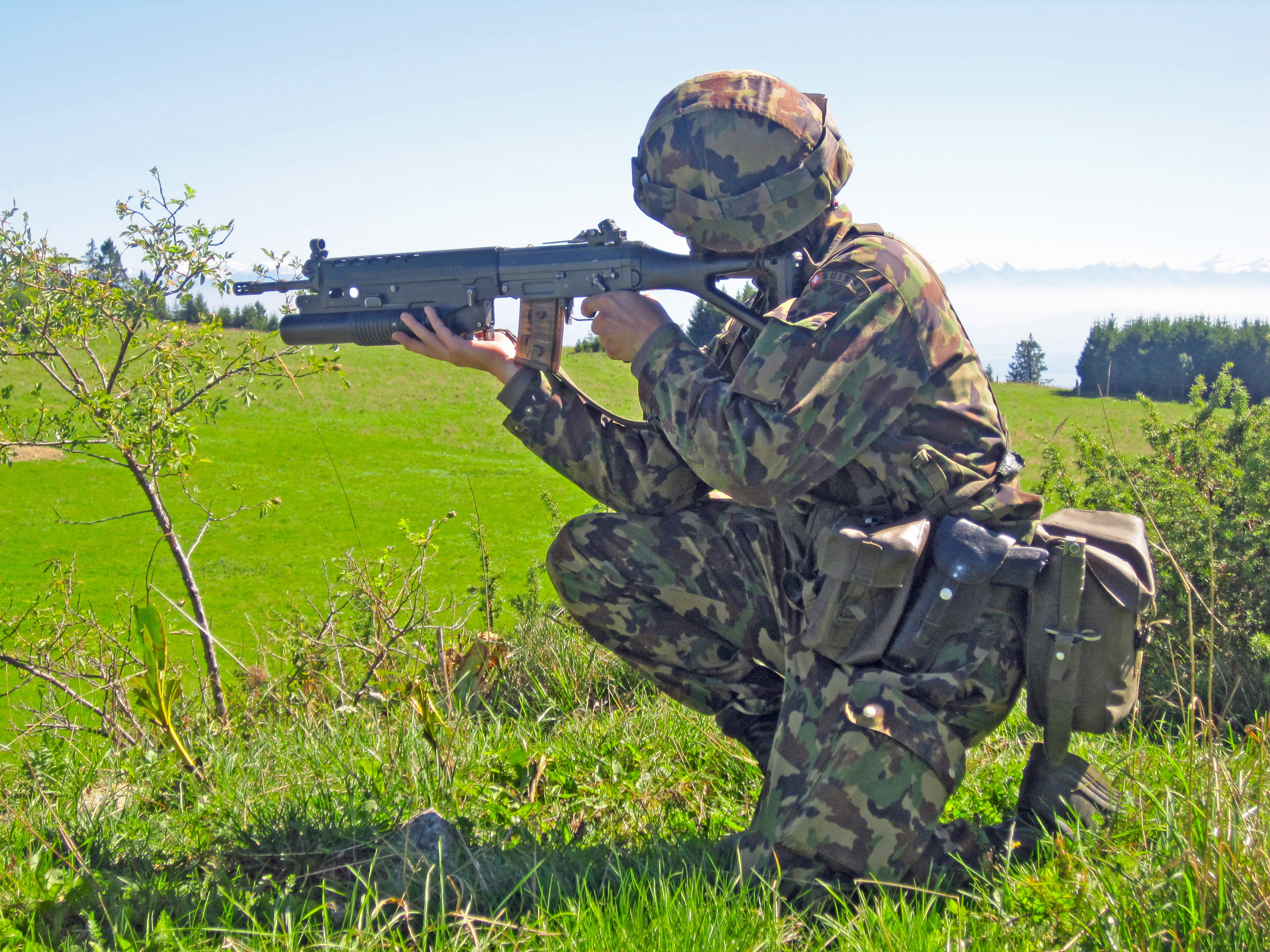
- SIG GL 5040 mounted under a SIG SG 550
- Type: Grenade launcher
- Place of origin: Switzerland

Service history
- In service: 1997–present
- Used by: See Users

Production history
- Designer: SIG
- Manufacturer: Swiss Arms
- Variants: GL 5140, GL 5340, GLG 40

Specifications
- Mass: 1.7 kg (3.75 lb) (GL 5040/GL 5140); 2.5 kg (5.5 lb) (GLG 40)
- Length: 432 mm (17.0 in) (GL 5040, GL 5140); 710 mm (28.0 in) stock extended / 480 mm (18.9 in) stock folded (GLG 40)
- Barrel length: 305 mm (12.0 in)
- Cartridge: 40x46mm
- Action: Breech-loaded, single-shot
- Muzzle velocity: 75 m/s (246 ft/s)
- Effective firing range: 200 m (220 yd)
- Feed system: Manually loaded
- Sights: Folding leaf sight

The SIG GL 5040/5140 is a 40 mm grenade launcher, which can be mounted under all SIG SG 550/551 assault rifle models and is operated in single-shot mode. For compact SG 552/553, the smaller GL 5340 grenade launcher can be used.

== Users ==
- Switzerland: The Swiss military in-service designation for the GL 5040 is 40 mm Gewehraufsatz 97.
- Malaysia: Used by Malaysian Coast Guard.
