= Infantry Corps (Malaysia) =

Directorate for infantry in Malaysian Army

- Kor Infantri كور ينفنتري
- Founded: April 2014; 12 years ago
- Country: Malaysia
- Branch: Malaysian Army
- Part of: Army Headquarters
- Garrison/HQ: Wisma Kementah, Kuala Lumpur
- Mottos: Siap siaga ('Readiness'); Infantry unity

Commanders
- Director of Infantry: Brigadier General Saiful Bahari Zainol

The Infantry Corps (Malay: Kor Infantri; Jawi: كور ينفنتري) is the administrative formation responsible for all infantry-related matters within the Malaysian Army. Established in April 2014, it succeeded the Directorate of Infantry (Malay: Jabatanarah Infantri). The corps is based at Wisma Kementah, also known as Wisma Pertahanan, and reports directly to Army Headquarters.

The primary role of the Infantry Corps is to set the strategic direction for infantry units in the Malaysian Army, ensuring that their operational capabilities, training, and equipment remain modern and comparable to international standards. Its responsibilities also cover the indoctrination and professional development of personnel, welfare services such as recreational activities, and the management of human resources for infantry regiments and battalions. To fulfil these functions, the corps works closely with other departments and training centres within the Malaysian Army.

The corps is headed by the Director of Infantry (Malay: Pengarah Infantri). The current director is Brigadier General Saiful Bahari Zainol.

== Roles ==
The Infantry Corps serves as the administrative formation responsible for all infantry regiments and battalions within the Malaysian Army. The regiments under its purview are:

- Royal Malay Regiment (RMR; Malay: Rejimen Askar Melayu Diraja, abbreviated RAMD)
- Royal Ranger Regiment (RRR; Malay: Rejimen Renjer Diraja, abbreviated RRD)
- Border Regiment (BR; Malay: Rejimen Sempadan, abbreviated RS)

=== Administration ===
At the administrative level, the Infantry Corps is tasked with setting the strategic direction, overseeing indoctrination, and managing human resources for infantry personnel. The first two responsibilities require close cooperation with other commands, departments, and training centres within the Malaysian Army. In terms of human resource management, the corps is involved from the recruitment stage through promotion processes up to retirement. Other administrative matters are handled at divisional and brigade levels, where infantry battalions are garrisoned.

=== Personnel development ===
The Infantry Corps assumes responsibility for new recruits and newly commissioned officers assigned to the infantry upon completion of their basic training. These personnel are required to undergo an additional indoctrination course tailored to their rank, whether officer or other rank. The purpose of this training is to instil the infantry ethos and mindset. The current emphasis includes the ethos of heroism, joint warfare innovation, and capability reinforcement.

=== Welfare services ===
The Infantry Corps also coordinates welfare services both within the infantry regiments and in cooperation with other corps and regiments of the Malaysian Army. Activities such as sports competitions, recreational programmes, and social events are organised to ensure that the welfare of infantry personnel is maintained during their free time, thereby enabling them to perform effectively in operational tasks.

== Structures ==
In 1988, the Army Headquarters draughted plans to modernise the organisation of the Malaysian Army. These plans, known as the Army 2000 Plan, included a major reorganisation of the infantry. Under this framework, infantry battalions were categorised into four types:

- Standard Line Infantry
- Mechanised Infantry
- Parachute Infantry
- Light Infantry

Prior to this reorganisation, infantry battalions were generally classified either as Standard Line Infantry Battalions or Infantry Support Battalions.

In the present day, the Malaysian Army's infantry battalions are structured into four main types:

- Standard Infantry Battalions
- Ceremonial Infantry Battalions
- Mechanised Infantry Battalions
- Specialised Infantry Battalions

=== Standard Infantry Battalions ===
The Standard Infantry Battalions (Malay: Batalion Infantri Standard) form the core and largest component of the Malaysian Army's assault infantry. These battalions are distributed across the country and placed under the command of army brigades. They are trained and equipped for both offensive and defensive operations, with particular emphasis on jungle and urban warfare in line with Malaysia's diverse terrain.

In peacetime, standard infantry battalions also support civil authorities, undertaking tasks such as assisting during natural disasters, maintaining public order, securing national borders, and safeguarding key areas of strategic interest.

In 2022, the Border Regiment's battalions were reorganised and upgraded from Border Security Infantry Battalions to Standard Infantry Battalions. This restructuring allowed them to be integrated into infantry brigades and deployed in full infantry operations.

At present, the Malaysian Army fields 38 standard infantry battalions. Their organisation follows the principles of the Universal Infantry Battalion Structure adopted by many modern armies, including NATO members, albeit with modifications tailored to Malaysian conditions and operational requirements.

=== Ceremonial Infantry Battalions ===
The Ceremonial Infantry Battalions (Malay: Batalion Infantri Istiadat) are infantry units assigned primarily to ceremonial and state functions. Their responsibilities include providing guards of honour, participating in military parades, and serving as foot guards to the King of Malaysia. Stationed in Kuala Lumpur, they represent the most senior battalions of their respective corps and regiments.

Their principal duties involve formally receiving both foreign and local dignitaries, guarding the Istana Negara, and supporting police and other civil authorities within the capital when required.

At present, two infantry battalions perform public duties: the 1st Battalion, Royal Malay Regiment, and the 1st Battalion, Royal Ranger Regiment, both of which fall under the 12th Infantry Brigade (Foot Guards).

=== Mechanised Infantry Battalions ===
The Mechanised Infantry Battalions (Malay: Batalion Infantri Mekanize) are infantry units equipped with armoured personnel carriers (APCs) or infantry fighting vehicles (IFVs) to provide mobility, protection, and enhanced combat capability. At present, the Malaysian Army operates only IFVs, specifically the DefTech AV8 Gempita and the ACV-300 Adnan, for its mechanised infantry. Historically, APCs such as the Radpanzer Condor were employed, but these were fully phased out in 2024. The Panthera F9 APC is still in service but is restricted to international peacekeeping missions with MALBATT and is not deployed for operational use within Malaysia.

There are currently four mechanised infantry battalions: the 7th Battalion (Mechanised) RRR, the 12th Battalion (Mechanised) RMR, the 14th Battalion (Mechanised) RMR, and the 19th Battalion (Mechanised) RMR. All four are under the command of the 4th Mechanised Brigade.

The number of mechanised battalions in the Malaysian Army remains relatively small compared to the standard infantry battalions, largely due to Malaysia's challenging topography of dense rainforests, hills, rivers, swamps, and coastal terrain, which are less suited to the large-scale deployment of armoured vehicles.

=== Specialised Infantry Battalions ===
The Specialised Infantry Battalions are elite infantry formations tasked with conducting special operations and capable of deployment by air, sea, or land. They serve as the Army's premier shock troops, trained in airborne and air assault operations, as well as amphibious warfare. These battalions can operate independently as specialised combat formations or be called upon to support special forces, providing a larger strategic advantage during special operations missions.

This category was formally established in 2020. At present, four battalions fall under this role: the 8th Battalion (Parachute) RRR, the 9th Battalion (Parachute) RMR, the 17th Battalion (Parachute) RMR, and the 18th Battalion (Parachute) RMR. All are currently part of the 10th Parachute Brigade, serving as its main assault units and forming the core of the Malaysian Rapid Deployment Forces.

Prior to 2020, these battalions were categorised as standard infantry battalions with additional insertion capabilities. Following their reorganisation and upgrade in 2020, they were reclassified as special operations capable units, marking a significant shift in their operational role and strategic importance within the Malaysian Army.
