= Medical Company (Parachute), Royal Medical and Dental Corps =

- Kompeni Perubatan (Para) Kor Kesihatan Diraja
- Founded: 3 January 1992 (33 years ago)
- Country: Malaysia
- Allegiance: Yang di-Pertuan Agong ('King of Malaysia')
- Branch: Malaysian Army
- Type: Airborne medic, forward surgical teams
- Role: Airborne operations; Air assault; Forward surgical; Combat medic; Combat casualty care; Military medicine
- Part of: 10th Parachute Brigade
- Garrison/HQ: Camp Terendak, Malacca
- Nickname(s): "Para Viper"
- Colours: Maroon, blue and gold
- Website: @paraviper.kpp (Official social media)

Commanders
- Current commander: Lt Col (Dr) Mohd Azman Hj Kamarudin

The Medical Company (Parachute), Royal Medical Corps (Malay: Kompeni Perubatan (Payung Terjun), Kor Kesihatan Diraja), also known as Para Viper or abbreviated KPP from its local name, is a company-sized airborne combat medic unit of the Malaysian Army's Royal Medical Corps. It has been a part of the 10th Parachute Brigade since 1994 and is responsible for providing medical support to the brigade.

Lt Col (Dr) Mohd Azman Hj Kamarudin is the current commander of the Medical Company (Para), having taken over from Major (Dr) Syed Fareez Syed Nasir on 26 January 2022.

== History ==
It was unofficially established on 3 January 1992 by the Royal Medical Corps as a medical task force to provide medical support to the 10th Strategic Brigade (now renamed the 10th Parachute Brigade) and later to the Malaysian Rapid Deployment Force (RDF) in 1994.

On 1 June 1999, the Malaysian Army Command recognised the unit as an official military unit, and it was renamed Medical Company (Parachute), Royal Medical Corps, and it has been a part of the RDF ever since.

== Role and responsibilities ==
The KKP's primary role and responsibilities are in military medicine. There are numerous medical disciplines within the KPP, including surgeons, physicians, dentists, combat medics, nurses, and paramedic, and KPP members can be on the front lines during an assault while attached to another combat unit within the 10th Parachute Brigade (Abbr.: 10 PARA BDE), or in the back setting up field hospitals and performing combat casualty care. They also serve as paramedic during military exercises involving the 10 PARA BDE. Their main objective is comparable to that of the British Army's 16 Medical Regiment of the 16 Air Assault Brigade.

Even though the KKP is one of the 10 PARA BDE, its role during peacetime extends beyond the 10 PARA BDE. They can be deployed anywhere to provide medical assistance.

== Tactical Combat Casualty Care Course ==
The KKP is also required to handle the Tactical Combat Casualty Care Course (Malay: Kursus Tactical Combat Casualty Care — Kursus TCCC), one of the official courses in the Malaysian Army. This 10-day course teaches soldiers from all units in the Malaysian Army, including the 10 PARA BDE and the 21st Special Service Group, how to minimise risk when dealing with casualties during combat. This course is divided into three stages, which are as follows:

1. Treatment during combat
2. Tactical field treatment
3. Tactical medivac

== Training ==
All of its members, regardless of medical speciality, are trained by the Royal Medical Corps. As a unit that provides combat service support to the 10 PARA BDE, its members are not required to complete the Basic Rapid Deployment Force Course and earn the maroon beret. All of them, however, must complete the Basic Parachute Course at the Special Warfare Training Centre. Nonetheless, the large majority of them complete the Basic Rapid Deployment Force Course and receive the maroon beret.
