= 17th Battalion (Parachute), Royal Malay Regiment =

- Batalion ke-17, Rejimen Askar Melayu Diraja (Para)
- Founded: 1 August 1970 (54 years ago)
- Country: Malaysia
- Allegiance: Yang di-Pertuan Agong ('King of Malaysia')
- Branch: Malaysian Army
- Type: Airborne infantry
- Role: Airborne operations; Air assault; Raid
- Size: 6 companies
- Part of: 10th Parachute Brigade
- Garrison/HQ: Terendak Camp, Malacca
- Mascot(s): Eagle

Commanders
- Current commander: Lieutenant Colonel Andy Herman Rahimi
- Sergeant of the Regiment: WO1 Mohd Faizal Abdul Rahman
- Notable commanders: Lieutenant General Dato' Suhaimi Mohd Zuki; General Tan Sri Zulkiple Kassim

The 17th Battalion (Parachute), Royal Malay Regiment (Malay: Batalion ke-17, Rejimen Askar Melayu Diraja (Payung Terjun)), abbreviated 17 RAMD (Para) from its local name, is a battalion-sized airborne infantry unit of the Malaysian Army's Royal Malay Regiment. Since 10 October 1994, 17 RAMD has been a part of the 10th Parachute Brigade.

The current commander of the 17 RAMD (Para) is Lieutenant Colonel Andy Herman Rahimi.

== History ==
=== Formed as an infantry unit ===
On 1 August 1970, the Ministry of Defense established the 17 RAMD as an infantry company in Kementah Camp, Kuala Lumpur as part of Operation Pembena. The pioneer team consists of only one officer and ten other ranks. Captain H.T Sharif Abdul Gaffur was tasked with expanding the unit to operational size. Captain Sharif was able to increase the unit's strength to three officers and 57 other ranks by 9 November 1970, and the unit was transferred to Majidee Camp in Johor Bahru. The unit was upgraded to battalion size on 23 November 1970, and Lieutenant Colonel Adam Abu Bakar was appointed as the first Commander of 17 RAMD. On 23 November 1970, the 17th RAMD became operational.

In November 1982, 17 RAMD were assigned to the 7th Infantry Brigade and relocated to Kukusan Camp in Tawau to serve under the Army East Field Command. Four years later, the 17 RAMD was reassigned to Army West Field Command and transferred to the 1st Infantry Brigade. The garrison was also relocated to Terendak Camp in Malacca.

=== Peacekeeping ===
17 RAMD were assigned to the MALBATT United Nations Transition Assistance Group peacekeeping mission in Namibia in the 1988, second involvement after a few years focus against communist insurgency.

=== Reconstruct for an airborne role ===
17 RAMD and the 9th Battalion, Royal Malay Regiment (9 RAMD) were transferred under the command of the 10th Strategic Brigade in 1990, and both battalions were trained as airborne infantry at the Special Warfare Training Centre. The unit was officially renamed the 17th Battalion (Parachute), Royal Malay Regiment in 1992. On 1 January 1994, the 17 RAMD (Para) became a fully operational airborne unit.

=== Reassemble as the Rapid Deployment Force ===
The Malaysian Army's top brass intends to combine all airborne units into a single combat force. The 8th Battalion (Parachute), Royal Ranger Regiment (8 RRD (Para)), 9 RAMD (Para), and 17 RAMD (Para) were merged into a single airborne unit in 1993 as its airborne infantry element. On 10 October 1994, following Exercise Halilintar, then-prime minister Dr Mahathir Mohamad officially introduced the unit as the Rapid Deployment Force, and the 10th Strategic Brigade was renamed the 10th Parachute Brigade. The 10th Parachute Brigade is becoming an independent combat force reporting directly to the Chief of the Army.

== Role and responsibilities ==
17 RAMD (Para), 8 RRD (Para), 9 RAMD (Para), and 18 RAMD (Para) serve as airborne infantry units for the Rapid Deployment Force (RDF). The RDF's airborne infantry is tasked with being able to deploy at any time and to any location via air, land, or sea. They have five primary roles, which are as follows:

1. Operate conventionally, either independently or as part of a joint force, in response to threats that occur within or outside of Malaysia.
2. Defending and rescuing Malaysian citizens and property located abroad.
3. Assisting law enforcement with any threats that occur within Malaysia.
4. Fight the insurgency.
5. Assisting friendly countries in the event of a natural disaster, defending their citizens, or serving as a peacekeeper.

== Formations ==
=== Current formation ===
Terendak Camp is home to 17 RAMD (Para). The unit is made up of six paratrooper companies and one family welfare organisation.

Current Formation of 17 RAMD (Para)
| Name | Type |
|---|---|
| 17 RAMD (Para) Headquarters | Management and administration of the battalion |
| Alpha Company | Airborne infantry company |
| Bravo Company | Airborne infantry company |
| Charlie Company | Airborne infantry company |
| Delta Company | Airborne infantry company |
| Support Company | Mortar, heavy machine-gun, anti-tank and communications support |
| BAKAT 17 RAMD PARA | Support for the battalion's family welfare |

== Notable members ==
1 Star General

CO 1: Brigadier Gen Dato' Adam b. Abu Bakar

CO 3: Brigadier Gen Dato' Pahlawan Mohamed Shukor b. Hj Abdullah

CO 8: Brigedier Gen Dato' Nik Mohd Za'aba bin Nik Daud

CO 16: Brigadier Gen Datuk Jalaludin b. MD Yusof

CO 23: Brigadier Gen Khairul Azmizal b. Ahmad Natal

2 Star General

CO 2: Maj Gen Dato' Raja Ibrahim b. Shariman

CO 14: Maj Gen Dato' Mazelan b. Kasap

3 Star General

CO 4 : Lt Gen Dato' Abdul Ghani b. Abdullah

CO 10: Lt Gen Datuk Abdul Ghaffir b. Abdul Hamid

CO 12 : Lt Gen Dato' Masood b. Hi Zainal Abidin

CO 15: Lt Gen Dato' Suhaimi b. Hj Mohd Zuki

CO 17: Lt Gen Dato' Hasagaya b. Abdullah

4 Star General

CO 5: Gen Dato' Ismail b. Hasan

CO 13: Gen Tan Sri Dato' Sri Zulkiple b. Hj Kassim

- Tengku Amir Shah - His Royal Highness Captain Tengku Amir Shah is the crown prince of Selangor. Despite the fact that the Sultan of Selangor is the Captain-in-Chief of the Royal Malaysian Navy, HRH decides to join the Malaysian Army. After graduating from the Royal Military Academy Sandhurst on 15 April 2016, his first unit in the Malaysian Army was 17 RAMD (Para). He accomplished the Basic Rapid Deployment Force Course series in 2016 and has been with 17 RAMD since then. He is an officer in the Assault Pioneer Platoon, 17 RAMD (Para).
