= 10th Squadron (Parachute), Royal Army Engineers Regiment =

- 10 Skuadron RAJD (Para)
- Founded: 1 April 1980 (45 years ago)
- Country: Malaysia
- Allegiance: Yang di-Pertuan Agong ('King of Malaysia')
- Branch: Malaysian Army
- Type: Airborne sapper
- Role: Combat engineering; Air assault; Maritime search and rescue; Military engineering
- Part of: 10th Parachute Brigade
- Garrison/HQ: Camp Terendak, Malacca
- Nickname(s): "Airborne sappers"
- Motto(s): Ubique ('Everywhere') (Latin)
- Colours: Sapper blue, maroon and marigold

Commanders
- Current commander: Major Ahmad Farouq Ishak
- Second-in-command: Captain Muhammad Kamil Hamzah

The 10th Squadron (Parachute), Royal Army Engineers Regiment (Abbr.: 10 SQN RAER (Para); Malay: Skuadron ke-10 Rejimen Askar Jurutera Diraja (Para) — 10 Skn RAJD (Para)) is a company-sized airborne sapper from the Malaysian Army's Royal Army Engineers Regiment. 10 SQN RAER (Para) has been a part of the 10th Parachute Brigade since 10 October 1994 and is tasked with providing engineering support to the brigade.

All members of 10 SQN RAER (Para), as a part of the elite 10th Parachute Brigade, must be airborne trained and complete the Basic Rapid Deployment Force Course (Malaysian Army version of the UK's P Company).

== History ==
=== Formed as a Commando sapper ===
On 1 April 1980, the Malaysian Army established the 10th Commando Engineer Squadron, Engineer Regiment under the bill KP/TD/RANCANG/4668 to provide combat engineering support to the 1st Malaysian Special Service Regiment (now known as the 21st Special Service Group, or Grup Gerak Khas — GGK). The squadron's original mission was similar to that of the British Army's 24 Commando Royal Engineers. During its initial formation, the squadron consisted of only three officers and ten sappers. The squadron eventually grew to 10 officers and 218 other ranks before being fully absorbed by the GGK on 1 December 1981. The squadron was renamed the 21st Engineering Squadron, Special Service Group, and was assigned to provide combat engineering support to all GGK units.

=== Downgraded to a conventional field engineer ===
The squadron was transferred from the GGK to the Malaysian Army's 3rd Division (3 DIV) on 1 October 1986. The squadron was renamed the 10th Engineering Squadron, Engineer Regiment. On 31 October 1989, the squadron was transferred again, this time to the Malaysian Army's 1st Division (1 DIV), and was relocated from the Camp Terendak in Malacca to the Camp Penrissen in Kuching.

=== Reconstruct for an airborne sapper role ===
The 10th Engineering Squadron was scheduled to be converted to an airborne sapper unit in the early 1990s. The squadron returned to Camp Terendak on 1 November 1992, along with other Malaysian Army existing and future airborne units. Under the bill KP/TD/JURUTERA/8416 Vol 1, the squadron was transferred to the 10th Strategic Brigade of the 11th Strategic Division (11 DIV STRA) and renamed the 10th Squadron (Parachute), Royal Army Engineers Regiment in January 1993.

=== Reassemble as the Rapid Deployment Force ===
After Exercise Halilintar in Langkawi on 10 October 1994, then-Prime Minister Dr Mahathir Mohamad officially introduced the world to the new Malaysian Rapid Deployment Force, which included the 10 SQN RAER (Para) and other airborne units. The 10th Strategic Brigade was renamed the 10th Parachute Brigade on that day, and it became an independent military unit in the Malaysian Army, reporting directly to the Chief of the Army.

== Role and responsibilities ==
The role and responsibilities of the 10 SQN RAER (Para) are similar to those of other squadrons in the Royal Army Engineers Regiment, but because they are airborne trained, they can conduct airborne and air assault operations. Their mission is similar to that of the British Army's 9 Parachute Squadron RE.

Aside from that, they were tasked with rescuing and retrieving members of the 10th Parachute Brigade who had landed on the sea during static or free fall parachute exercises. Together with the Pathfinder Company (Parachute), they must also supervise and maintain the 10th Parachute Brigade's shooting range.

== In the media ==
Television featuring 10 SQN RAER (Para)

- 2019: "Leftenan Zana", a TV series by TV3 starring Janna Nick and Sheila Rusly about the youngest daughter of a retired army officer who wishes to carry on her father's legacy despite being prevented by her family. She eventually progressed to the position of engineering officer and airborne sapper in the 10 SQN RAER (Para). This series aired on 7 February 2019.
