= 9th Battalion (Parachute), Royal Malay Regiment =

- Batalion ke-9, Rejimen Askar Melayu Diraja (Para)
- Founded: 1 September 1965 (59 years ago)
- Country: Malaysia
- Allegiance: Yang di-Pertuan Agong ('King of Malaysia')
- Branch: Malaysian Army
- Type: Airborne infantry
- Role: Airborne operations; Air assault; Raid
- Size: 6 companies
- Part of: 10th Parachute Brigade
- Garrison: Camp Terendak, Malacca
- Nickname(s): "Harimau Para" ('Airborne tigers'), "9 RAMD"
- Motto(s): Tak Kenal Menyerah ('Does not know to give up')
- Colours: Green and black
- March: Pahlawan sembilan
- Mascot(s): Tiger
- Anniversaries: 6 September
- Engagements: Indonesia–Malaysia confrontation; Communist insurgency in Malaysia (1968–1989); 2006 East Timorese crisis
- Website: 9melayupara.com

Commanders
- Current commander: Lieutenant Colonel Norazlan Abu
- Notable commanders: General Yaacob Mohd Zin, General Zulkifeli Mohd Zin

The 9th Battalion (Parachute), Royal Malay Regiment (Malay: Batalion ke-9, Rejimen Askar Melayu Diraja (Payung Terjun)), abbreviated 9 RAMD (Para) from its local name, is a battalion-sized airborne infantry unit of the Malaysian Army's Royal Malay Regiment. Since 10 October 1994, 9 RAMD has been a part of the 10th Parachute Brigade.

The current commander of the 9 RAMD (Para) is Lieutenant Colonel Mohd Salmuazhari Md Salleh.

== History ==
=== Formed as an infantry unit ===
On 1 September 1965, during the Indonesia–Malaysia conflict, a pioneer team was formed in Majidee Camp, Johor Bahru. Lieutenant Colonel Mahmood Sulaiman was appointed as its first commander and was tasked with growing the unit to combat size. The unit's strength was increased on 31 December 1965, and two new companies were formed: Battalion HQ Company and A Company. On 5 March 1966, 120 new soldiers were transferred to 9 RAMD, resulting in the formation of B and C Companies. Later, D Company was added, and the infantry battalion was officially established.

The 9 RAMD was the first infantry battalion from Malaysia's post-independence army to be invited to participate in a military exercise overseas. In 1974, the unit travelled to Australia to participate in Exercise Latin Forum. Four years prior, 9 RAMD was also the first infantry battalion to participate in a Commonwealth Nations military exercise called Exercise Bersatu Padu.

The 9 RAMD was actively involved in the Communist insurgency in Malaysia (1968–1989), particularly in Sarawak. Between 1972 and 1974, the 9 RAMD was involved in numerous skirmishes and managed to kill 38 communist terrorists and apprehend 16, an extraordinary feat for a non-special forces unit. Because of their achievements in Sarawak, the King of Malaysia had the honour of presenting the battalion with its colours on 22 March 1975.

=== Reconstruct for an airborne role ===
In the early 1990s, as part of the TD 2000 plan, 9 RAMD and 17th Battalion, Royal Malay Regiment (17 RAMD) were designated to be upgraded to an airborne unit. A few of its members were sent to Special Warfare Training Centre in Malacca to receive airborne training. In early December 1992, 9 RAMD was transferred from Quetter Camp in Kluang to Terendak Camp in Malacca and assigned to the Malaysian Army's 11th Strategic Division's 10th Strategic Brigade. On 13 December 1992, under the bill KP/TD/P&P/4019/3, the 9th RAMD was officially renamed the 9th Battalion (Parachute), Royal Malay Regiment, and given one year to fully train to achieve operational status as an airborne unit. By 1 January 1995, 70% of the 9 RAMD had received parachute training.

=== Reassemble as the Rapid Deployment Force ===
The Malaysian Army's top brass intends to combine all airborne units into a single combat force. The 8th Battalion (Parachute), Royal Ranger Regiment, 9 RAMD (Para), and 17 RAMD (Para) were merged into a single airborne unit in 1993 as its airborne infantry element. On 10 October 1994, following Exercise Halilintar, then-prime minister Dr Mahathir Mohamad officially introduced the unit as the Rapid Deployment Force, and the 10th Strategic Brigade was renamed the 10th Parachute Brigade. The 10th Parachute Brigade is becoming an independent combat force reporting directly to the Chief of the Army.

== Role and responsibilities ==
The 9 RAMD (Para) serves as an airborne infantry unit for the Rapid Deployment Force (RDF). The RDF's airborne infantry is tasked with being able to deploy at any time and to any location via air, land, or sea. They have five primary roles, which are as follows:

1. Operate conventionally, either independently or as part of a joint force, in response to threats that occur within or outside of Malaysia.
2. Defending and rescuing Malaysian citizens and property located abroad.
3. Assisting law enforcement with any threats that occur within Malaysia.
4. Fight the insurgency.
5. Assisting friendly countries in the event of a natural disaster, defending their citizens, or serving as a peacekeeper.

== Structure ==
=== Current structure ===
Since December 1992, the 9 RAMD (Para) has been stationed at Terendak Camp in Malacca. Under 9 RAMD, there are six paratrooper companies and one welfare organisation.

Current structuren of 9 RAMD (Para)
Name	Type
9 RAMD (Para) Headquarters	Management and administration of the battalion
Alpha Company	Airborne infantry company
Bravo Company	Airborne infantry company
Charlie Company	Airborne infantry company
Delta Company	Airborne infantry company
Support Company	Mortar, heavy machine-gun, anti-tank and communications support
BAKAT 9 RAMD PARA	Support for the battalion's family welfare

=== Disbanded units ===
==== Tiger Platoon, 9 RAMD ====
The Tiger Platoon was a commando unit of the 9 Royal Malay Regiment. In 1972, the platoon was established as a long-range reconnaissance patrol for 9 RAMD, and its status was later upgraded to a commando unit at the end of 1972. Tiger Platoon 9 RAMD was active during the Communist insurgency in Malaysia (1968–1989), particularly in Sarawak, and this platoon was responsible for the majority of terrorists killed by 9 RAMD. Two members of this platoon received Malaysia's second highest valour award, the Star of the Commander of Valour (Malay: Pingat Gagah Berani – PGB).

This platoon's 31 members are as follows:

1. Captain (Quartermaster) Shamsudin Ghows (400788)
2. Captain Mohd Yasin Hj Tahir (410032)
3. Second Lieutenant Zainal Seman (411031)
4. Second Lieutenant Ibrahim Hj Sudin (410778)
5. 8165 Warrant Officer Class II Jantan Nyamat, PGB
6. 10597 Sergeant Mohd Yusof Mohd Yunus
7. 11590 Corporal Abd Wahab Abd Latif
8. 16767 Corporal Zainal Abidin Panjang Salleh
9. 10157 Corporal Hadi Ghazali
10. 17300 Corporal Kamaruddin Atan
11. 9592 Corporal Safar Ibrahim, PGB
12. 11585 Corporal Othman Leman
13. 928844 Corporal Ibrahim Wan Chik
14. 928824 Lance Corporal Abu Bakar Ahmad
15. 17816 Lance Corporal Mohd Yusof Nazir
16. 16896 Private Mohamad Abu Bakar
17. 17591 Private Dalip Juri
18. 928782 Private Ibrahim Harun
19. 19085 Private Abd Rahman Mohamad
20. 930827 Private Sharif Harun
21. 23493 Private Mohd Ali Abd Rahman
22. 26068 Private Minhad Abd Rahman
23. 23291 Private Mohamad Abd Rahman
24. 19297 Private Wan Yaakob Wan Ibrahim
25. 23326 Private Othman Sulaiman
26. 19866 Private Halim Sulaiman
27. 19072 Private Johan Baba
28. 25602 Private Azamat Sudin
29. 28616 Private Mohamad Sulung
30. 19961 Private Abd Rasap Siang
31. 19301 Private Che Daud Che Soh

== Traditions and customs ==
=== Colours ===
- Green – Comradery and trust are represented by this colour.
- Black – Represents sheer tenacity and courage.

=== Uniforms ===
Maroon beret

The maroon beret represented the battalion's ability as an airborne unit. The British Army's Parachute Regiment had a strong influence on the Malaysian Army's airborne force establishment. Since 10 October 1994, all RDF-trained members have worn this beret.

=== Ceremonial object ===
Sculpture of a silver horse warrior

The horse warrior, made of pure silver, was presented to the battalion by General Tan Sri Yaacob Mohd Zain, the 10th Chief of Defence Forces, in 1993. General Tan Sri Yaacob was the 9 RAMD's third Commander. The sculpture, which cost RM 46,000, was made in Kuala Lumpur. Its foundation is made of teak. It represents the strength and agility of the 9 RAMD.

== List of commanders ==
No.	Portrait	Commander	Took office	Left office	Time in office	Ref.
1	Mahmood bin Sulaiman	Lieutenant Colonel; Mahmood bin Sulaiman	1 September 1965	1 August 1966	334 days	
2	Tahir Ismail	Lieutenant Colonel; Tahir Ismail	2 August 1966	27 July 1968	1 year, 360 days	
3	Yaacob Mohd Zain	Lieutenant Colonel; Yaacob Mohd Zain (born 1935)	28 July 1968	18 August 1970	2 years, 21 days	
4	Nik Mahmood Fakarudin Mohd Kamel	Lieutenant Colonel; Nik Mahmood Fakarudin Mohd Kamel	19 August 1970	3 May 1972	1 year, 258 days	
5	Mohd Zin Daud	Lieutenant Colonel; Mohd Zin Daud	4 May 1972	24 December 1972	234 days	
6	Izaidin Shamsudeen	Lieutenant Colonel; Izaidin Shamsudeen	25 December 1972	31 December 1974	2 years, 6 days	
7	Noor Khan Siraj Khan	Lieutenant Colonel; Noor Khan Siraj Khan	1 January 1975	31 December 1975	364 days	
8	Abdul Samad Ayob	Lieutenant Colonel; Abdul Samad Ayob	1 January 1976	31 December 1978	2 years, 364 days	
9	Abdullah Hussin	Lieutenant Colonel; Abdullah Hussin	1 January 1979	31 December 1980	1 year, 365 days	
10	Mohd Arshad Mohd Raji	Lieutenant Colonel; Mohd Arshad Mohd Raji	1 January 1981	12 July 1982	1 year, 192 days	
11	Mazlan Baharudin	Lieutenant Colonel; Mazlan Baharudin	13 July 1982	31 May 1985	2 years, 322 days	
12	Abd Aziz Hanapi	Lieutenant Colonel; Abd Aziz Hanapi	1 June 1985	15 September 1989	4 years, 106 days	
13	Che Ojang Ab Rahman	Lieutenant Colonel; Che Ojang Ab Rahman	16 September 1989	14 December 1992	3 years, 89 days	
14	Mohd Nawi Ibrahim	Lieutenant Colonel; Mohd Nawi Ibrahim	15 December 1992	31 July 1993	228 days	
15	Zulkifeli Mohd Zin	Lieutenant Colonel; Zulkifeli Mohd Zin (born 1954)	1 August 1993	4 March 1995	1 year, 215 days	
16	Che Hamzah Awang Kechik	Lieutenant Colonel; Che Hamzah Awang Kechik	5 March 1995	4 March 1996	365 days	
17	Johari Mat Shek	Lieutenant Colonel; Johari Mat Shek	5 March 1996	8 April 1998	2 years, 34 days	
18	Ismet Nayan Ismail	Lieutenant Colonel; Ismet Nayan Ismail	9 April 1998	6 January 2001	2 years, 272 days	
19	Mohd Nazri Abidin	Lieutenant Colonel; Mohd Nazri Abidin	7 January 2001	25 January 2003	2 years, 18 days	
20	Azman Shah Omar	Lieutenant Colonel; Azman Shah Omar	26 January 2003	19 November 2004	1 year, 298 days	
21	Nadzri Che Lah	Lieutenant Colonel; Nadzri Che Lah	20 November 2004	31 January 2007	2 years, 72 days	
22	Hamdan Ismail	Lieutenant Colonel; Hamdan Ismail	1 February 2007	15 February 2009	2 years, 14 days	
23	Abdul Karim Ahmad	Lieutenant Colonel; Abdul Karim Ahmad	16 February 2009	14 April 2012	3 years, 58 days	
24	Mohd Edafi Daud	Lieutenant Colonel; Mohd Edafi Daud	15 April 2012	27 June 2014	2 years, 73 days	
25	Ismail Mohamed	Lieutenant Colonel; Ismail Mohamed	27 June 2014	27 June 2016	2 years, 0 days	
26	Md Zaini Osman	Lieutenant Colonel; Md Zaini Osman	28 June 16	26 February 2019	2 years, 243 days	
27	Ahmad Fitri Othman	Lieutenant Colonel; Ahmad Fitri Othman	27 February 2019	25 January 2021	1 year, 333 days	
28	Norazlan Abu	Lieutenant Colonel; Norazlan Abu	26 January 2021	Incumbent	4 years, 149 days	

== Notable members ==
- Hayazi Abdul Aziz – Warrant Officer 1st Class (Rtd.) Hayazi bin Abdul Aziz is the first-ever Regimental Sergeant Major of the Malaysian Armed Forces (MAF), the highest non-commissioned appointment in the military. He began his career with 9 RAMD (Para), serving in key roles such as company sergeant major and parachute instructor warrant officer. On 7 May 2015, he was appointed Regimental Sergeant Major of the Malaysian Army and later, on 6 October 2019, became the inaugural holder of the Regimental Sergeant Major of the MAF position. He retired on 19 September 2024 after 31 years of distinguished service.
- Jantan Nyamat, PGB – Jantan bin Nyamat first joined the Malaysian Army in 1952 and served until 1959 before reenlisting on 15 November 1963 with 1 RAMD during the Indonesia–Malaysia Confrontation. After the formation of 9 RAMD in 1965, he transferred to the new battalion and later volunteered for its elite Tiger Platoon, where he rose to the rank of Platoon Sergeant. For his gallantry during an operation on 23 December 1972, he was awarded the Star of the Commander of Valour (PGB) by the King of Malaysia. He retired in 1979 with the rank of Warrant Officer Class II.
- Safar Ibrahim, PGB – Saafar bin Ibrahim enlisted in the Malaysian Army in 1953 and served as a section leader in the elite Tiger Platoon. On 20 December 1972, during a patrol ambushed by 20–25 communist terrorists, Safar and his four-man team, though wounded and outnumbered, managed to repel the attackers and kill one. With ammunition running low, he bravely exposed himself after 20 minutes of fighting to call for backup, using grenades as cover. For his courage, he was awarded the Star of the Commander of Valour (PGB) by the King of Malaysia. He retired as a corporal on 22 January 1977 and tragically died in a car accident in 1980.
- Taib Awal, PGB – Taib bin Awal enlisted in the Malaysian Army in the late 1960s and earned the Star of the Commander of Valour (PGB) for his bravery during the Gunung Pueh Clash in November 1973, where he fought alongside his commanding officer, Captain Hamid Awang.
- Yaacob Mohd Zain – General (Retd.) Tan Sri Yaacob Mohd Zain was the third Commander of 9 RAMD. He was promoted to the highest professional rank in the Malaysian Armed Forces, Chief of the Defence Forces, on 11 April 1992.
- Zulkifeli Mohd Zin – General (Retd.) Tan Sri Zulkifeli Mohd Zin was the 15th Commander of 9 RAMD (Para). He is the unit's first commander since it was rebuilt for an airborne role. On 15 June 2011, he was appointed the 18th Chief of the Defence Forces.
