= Pathfinder Company (Malaysia) =

Pathfinder Company (Parachute), 10th Parachute Brigade
- Kompeni Pandura (Para), 10 Bgd Para
- Founded: 1995; 31 years ago
- Country: Malaysia
- Branch: Malaysian Army
- Type: Pathfinder
- Role: Special operations; Direct action; Raiding; Special reconnaissance; Command, control and communication; Close air support; Forward observer; Combat intelligence
- Part of: 10th Parachute Brigade
- Garrison/HQ: Camp Terendak, Malacca
- Nicknames: "Tinjau Para" ('Airborne Recon'), "RECON"
- Mottos: Pantas, Senyap, Maut ('Swift, Silent, Deadly')
- Anniversaries: 1 July
- Engagements: Lahad Datu standoff (2013)
- Website: @Pandura10Para (Official social media)

Commanders
- Current commander: Major Mohd Salman Alias

Insignia
- Pandura Skills Badge

The Pathfinder Company (Parachute) (Malay: Kompeni Pandura (Para), pronounced /kəmpəniˈpɑːnˈdʊˈrɑː/) is a pathfinder and reconnaissance unit within Malaysian Army's 10th Parachute Brigade (10 PARA BDE).

This elite unit is composed of a small group of paratroopers specially trained to carry out high-stakes special operations missions for the brigade. They train together as a cohesive team and maintain strong relations with other elite forces within the Malaysian Armed Forces, including the 21st Special Service Group, Royal Malaysian Navy's Naval Special Forces, and the Royal Malaysian Air Force's RMAF Special Forces.

As of 9 January 2024, the unit is commanded by Major Mohd Salman Alias, who took over from Lieutenant Colonel Salmuazhari Md Salleh.

The Pandura is equivalent to the French Army's Commando Parachute Group, which serves as the pathfinder unit for the 11th Parachute Brigade.

== History ==
The Pathfinder Company (Parachute) was originally formed in 1995 as Platun Pandura (English: Pathfinder Platoon) to fulfil the need for an infiltration team capable of entering operational areas and providing navigation assistance and movement control for the main airborne forces. The unit was modelled after the Pathfinder Platoon of the British Army, which inspired its tactics and organisational structure.

On 1 June 1999, the Malaysian Army officially recognised the Pandura as a formal military unit. As the platoon expanded, it was reorganised into a full company on 1 July 2008, and its designation was officially changed to Pathfinder Company (Parachute).

The Pandura Company's capabilities have continued to grow, with a significant extension of its skill set on 11 August 2021. The unit was trained to parachute into the sea, swim to shore, and infiltrate enemy lines from the coastline, further enhancing its versatility in special operations. In present-day operations, the Pandura Company is influenced by and operates similarly to the U.S. Marine Corps Force Recon, emphasising versatility, deep reconnaissance, and high-value target elimination behind enemy lines.

== Etymology ==
The term 'Pandura' is an abbreviation of the Malay word 'Pandu Arah Udara', which translates directly to 'Pathfinder'.

== Roles ==
Initially, the Pandura Platoon's role was to provide 10 PARA BDE with navigation assistance and movement control for drops, flight paths, and landing in operational areas. The unit was tasked with studying, selecting, and marking out drop zones (DZ), landing zones (LZ), landing sites (LS), and plane landing points. Pandura paratroopers would infiltrate target areas, ensure their safety, and provide navigation support to enable larger airborne forces to land as a cohesive unit rather than scattered into smaller groups. Additionally, they were capable of directing artillery, aircraft, and naval gun fire support (NGF) during operations.

Over time, other combat elements, such as snipers and combat intelligence were incorporated into the Pandura Platoon, leading to its expansion into a full company. Pandura paratroopers could operate as sniper teams while also relaying critical information to aircraft pilots during operations. The Pandura, with its specialised skills, became known as the "eyes and ears" of 10 PARA BDE.

Due to their elite status, Pandura paratroopers were often selected to serve as instructors, teaching jungle survival skills and combat tactics to both local and international military units. The unit's close cooperation with the 10th Squadron (Parachute), Royal Army Engineers Regiment (The army's airborne sapper unit) also saw them take responsibility for overseeing the Para Integrated All Weather Multi Mission Range (PIAW), a shooting range managed by 10 PARA BDE.

== Formations ==
Because the Pandura unit is small and exclusive, much of its detailed operations remain classified. However, some platoons within the company are more well-known to the general public due to their specialised roles and high-profile operations. The most notable platoons include:

Name (English)	Name (Malay)	Roles
Recon Platoon	Platun Tinjau Pandura	The Recon Platoon is responsible for conducting deep special reconnaissance missions behind enemy lines. Their primary role is to provide real-time information about enemy positions, terrain, and other strategic factors to support the broader operational planning of the 10 PARA BDE. The Recon Platoon fulfils a role similar to a combination of USMC Force Recon (providing reconnaissance and intelligence) and USMC ANGLICO (directing fire support and guiding air/naval operations). The Recon Platoon key responsibilities include: Reconnaissance and Intelligence Gathering; Insertion Ahead of Main Forces; Raiding and marking key locations; Directing Fire Support
Sniper Platoon	Platun Sniper Pandura	The Sniper Platoon is trained to engage high-value targets at extended ranges, provide sniper overwatch, and assist with surveillance and intelligence gathering. The Sniper Platoon operates similarly to the USMC Scout Snipers, providing long-range precision fire and intelligence that supports broader tactical objectives. The Sniper Platoon key responsibilities include: Precision Target Elimination; Sniper Overwatch and Protection; Observation, surveillance, and target acquisition; Directing Fire Support

== Training ==
The new members of the 10 PARA BDE's Pandura Company were chosen based on combat qualifications and parachute insertion skills, including static line and free fall. Pandura paratroopers must also be able to operate visual aids and electronic equipment, as well as provide ground-to-air communication and drive various off-road vehicles such as all-terrain vehicles and motocross. They must be able to interpret and value the weather, wind direction, conditions, and cloud height, as well as the visibility and safety of the landing area, in real time.

Pandura paratrooper must have 'Mobility': the ability to operate by air, land and sea; and 'Flexibility': the ability to operate on short notice in a variety of ways, to deal with any type of contingency, whether low or high level. The Pandura Company's capabilities were extended on 11 August 2021. They were trained to parachute into the sea and swim to the coastlines in order to get behind enemy lines.

=== Preparatory course — unit level (4 weeks) ===
As a preparation for the actual pathfinder course conducted by the Special Warfare Training Centre (SWTC), the Pandura Company (Para) held a month of their own Pandura Course for the candidates.

=== Pathfinder course (7 weeks) ===
This 7-week course, known as Kursus Pandu Arah in Malay, is offered at SWTC. Members who complete the Pandura course will receive a Pandura badge. The following conditions must be met in order to receive the Pathfinder badge:

- Pass basic parachute course
- Pass pathfinder course

=== Basic free fall course (6 weeks) ===
Military free fall is the Pandura Company's specialty, which sets them apart from the other units in the 10 PARA BDE. This course is offered by SWTC and lasts 6 weeks.

=== Advanced training ===
Among the advanced training options available to Pandura Company paratroopers are:

- Advanced free fall (HAHO/HALO)
- Special reconnaissance
- Sniper
- Close air support
- Joint terminal attack controller

== Killed in the line of duty ==
Rank	Name	Date of death	Circumstances
Corporal	Mohamad Azrin Mohamad Isa	1 September 2021	He went missing on 29 August 2021, while participating in infiltration training while tactically swimming across the Pahang River during Exercise Para Predator Series 1/2021. On 1 September 2021, his body was discovered 75 kilometers away from where he was last seen. Lance Corporal Azrin was a member of Pandura Company (Para)'s Recon Platoon. On 2 September 2021, he was posthumously promoted to the rank of Corporal.

== Equipment ==
Aside from free-fall equipment, the Pandura paratroopers relied on vital navigation systems such as the Operational Parachutist Navigational System (OPANAS) and the Global Positioning System (GPS). They also use ground-to-air communication to communicate with aircraft for airborne force drops.

The Pandura paratroopers carry the same combat equipment as the other 10 PARA BDE's infantry units, with the exception of the sniper team.
