= 10th Parachute Brigade =

Malaysian Army special operations unit

- 10 Briged Para ١٠ بريڬيد ڤارا
- 10th Parachute Brigade's Insignia
- Founded: 5 October 1979; 47 years ago
- Country: Malaysia
- Branch: Malaysian Army
- Type: Specialised rapid deployment force
- Role: Special operations; Airborne operations; Amphibious operations; Rapid deployment
- Size: Brigade
- Part of: Rapid Deployment Force
- Garrison/HQ: Camp Terendak, Malacca
- Nicknames: "Storm Trooper", "Pasukan Sayap Berdarah" ('The Blood Wing Forces'), "Briged Halilintar" ('Thunderbolt Brigade'), "Malaysian Marine Corps"
- Patron: Chief of Army
- Motto: Tindak Pantas ('Act Fast')
- Beret: Maroon
- Anniversaries: 10 October
- Deployments: List: Communist insurgency in Malaysia (1968–1989); Genting Sempah incident (1995); East Timorese crisis (1999–2002); International Force East Timor (1999–2000); Cross border attacks in Sabah (1962–present); Operation Pasir (2000–present); Operation Daulat (2013); Afghanistan–Pakistan border conflicts (1949–present); Malaysian Medical Team, Chaman, Pakistan (2002); Malaysian Medical Team, Kashmir, Pakistan (2005); Indian Ocean earthquake and tsunami (2004); Malaysian Medical Team, Aceh, Indonesia (2004–2005); Timor-Leste crisis (2006); Operation Astute (2006); Arab–Israeli conflict (1948–present); UNIFIL (2007–present); War in Afghanistan (2001–2021); ISAF (2011–2014)

Commanders
- Current commander: Major General Khairul Anwar Soib
- Deputy commander: Brigadier General Fazillah Ibrahim

Insignia
- Parachutist badge

- Cap badge

- Tactical formation patches

The 10th Parachute Brigade (Note: In Malaysian English, the proper grammatical term for this unit is "10th Parachute Brigade". Other Commonwealth nations also use this naming style for their historical airborne forces units, such as the United Kingdom's 1st Parachute Brigade and Canada's 1st Canadian Parachute Battalion. France follows a similar naming convention with its 11th Parachute Brigade. For alternative names for this Malaysian unit, see the 10th Parachute Brigade (Malaysia)#Etymology) (Malay: Briged ke-10 Payung Terjun; Jawi: ١٠ بريڬيد ڤارا), commonly known as 10 PARA BDE, is a special operations formation of the Malaysian Army that serves as the primary strike element of the Malaysian Rapid Deployment Force (Malay: Pasukan Aturgerak Cepat or PAC). The brigade is trained to conduct forced entry operations across ground, airborne, airmobile, and amphibious domains.

Under the Manual Kualiti Standard Angkatan Tentera Malaysia (SATM; lit. 'Malaysian Armed Forces Standard Quality Manual'), the PAC element of the brigade is classified as part of the nation's special forces (Pasukan Khas). It shares this classification with the 21st Special Service Group, the Naval Special Forces (PASKAL), and the RMAF Special Forces (PASKAU), as well as specialised military personnel such as aircrews, military divers, submarine crews, and diving medical assistants.

Unlike regular Malaysian Army formations, 10 PARA BDE operates as an independent combined arms formation that reports directly to the Chief of Army, outside the command structure of any field army division. On 9 October 2020, under the 'ARMY 4NEXTG' plan, then Chief of Army General Zamrose Mohd Zain upgraded the status of 10 PARA BDE from an airborne infantry brigade to a special operations formation. In April 2023, the appointment of a major general to command the brigade reflected its elevated strategic importance. As part of the ongoing 10 PARA BDE's Way Forward restructuring initiative, the formation maintains its brigade organisation while expanding its multi-domain capabilities. This expansion includes incorporating airmobile marine infantry elements, along with plans to transition its official title to reflect its evolution beyond a traditional airborne role.

10 PARA BDE is notable as the only elite combat unit within the Malaysian Armed Forces that accepts female personnel into its ranks. Within the broader national security framework, the only other elite combat unit to integrate women is the Special Actions Unit (UTK) of the Royal Malaysia Police.

The brigade is commanded by Major General Datuk Khairul Anwar Soib, who succeeded Major General Datuk Khairul Azmizal Ahmad Natal on 4 February 2025.

== Etymology ==
The official Malay name, 'Briged Infantri Ke Sepuluh Paracut', translates to 'Tenth Parachute Infantry Brigade' in Malaysian English. (Note: As a Commonwealth country, Malaysia adheres to The Queen's English, or Received Pronunciation, for its official English.) The Malay term 'paracut' is borrowed from the English word 'parachute'. Alternatively, 'payung terjun' is another common Malay translation for parachute.

In English, the unit is officially known as the '10th Parachute Brigade'. Informally, people also refer the unit as the '10th Airborne Brigade', as the abbreviation 'PARA' indicates 'Airborne'. All terms—10 Brigade (Para), 10th Brigade (Parachute), 10th Brigade (Airborne), and 10th Paratrooper Brigade—refer to the same unit.

The units under this brigade, such as the 8th Battalion (Parachute), Royal Ranger Regiment, can be denoted in American English as the '8th Battalion (Airborne), Royal Ranger Regiment' or simply 8 RANGER (Airborne). Similarly, the special operations small unit tactics within this brigade, Pathfinder Company (Para), can be referred to as 'Pathfinder Company (Airborne)'.

== History ==
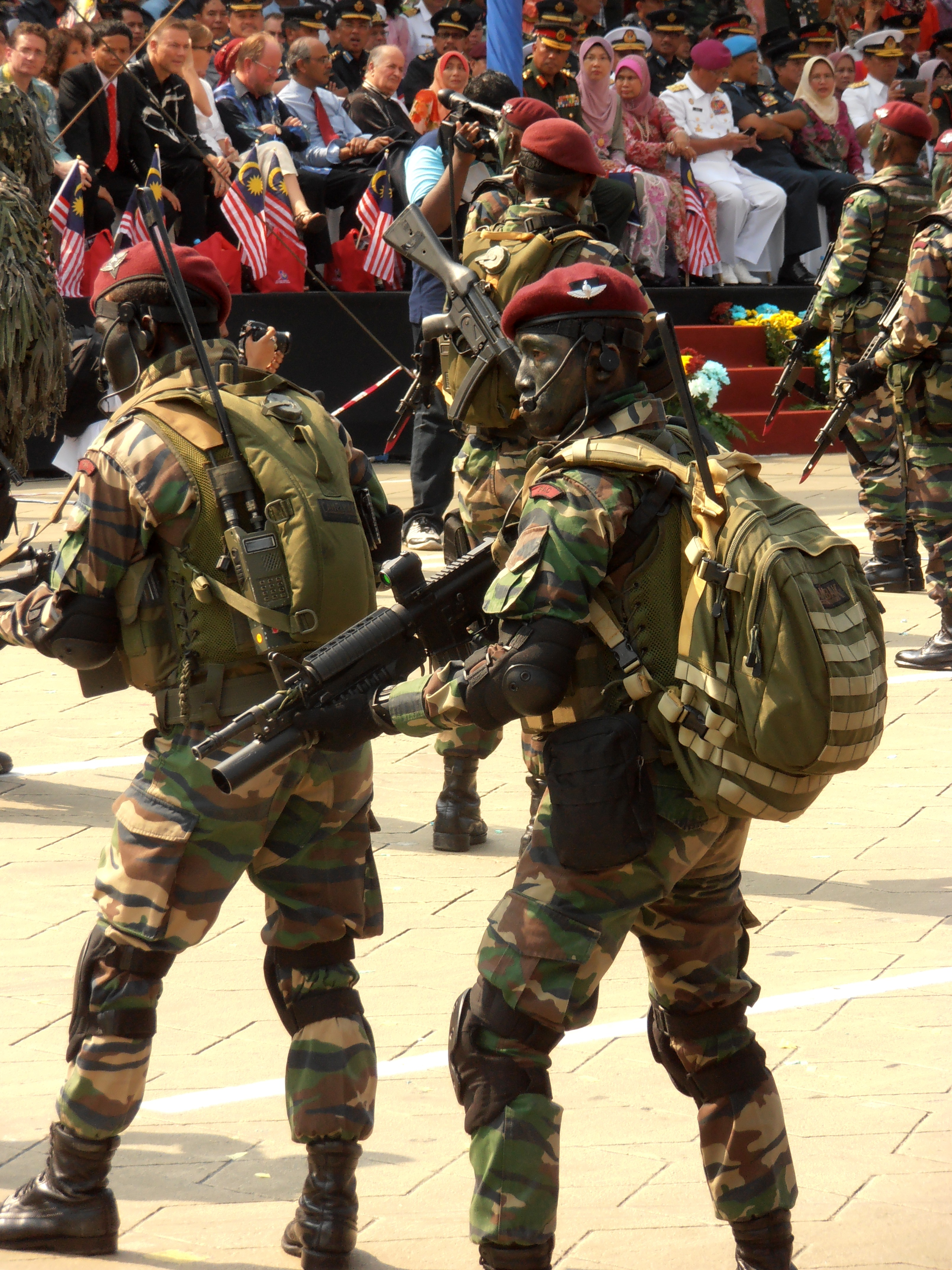
A paratrooper of 10 PARA BDE with Colt M4A1 with M203 grenade launcher and Aimpoint Micro-T1 red dot sight.

=== Established as an infantry brigade ===
The 10th Infantry Brigade was officially established on 5 October 1979 at Camp Sungai Besi in Kuala Lumpur during the Communist insurgency in Malaysia (1968–1989). At that time, the brigade was placed under the 2nd Infantry Division. Later, the brigade was relocated to Camp Pengkalan Hulu in Perak to relieve some of the area of operation from the 2nd Infantry Brigade.

=== Downsized to Task Force ===
The 10th Infantry Brigade was downsized in December 1982 and renamed to Task Force 083, while their area of operations remained unchanged. Since 1 January 1983, Task Force 083 has been assigned responsibility for the area of operations named Operation KOTA Echo/Foxtrot (Malay: Ops KOTA Echo/Foxtrot). Members of the task force are rotated among battalions from the Royal Malay Regiment and the Malaysian Ranger Regiment (now known as the Royal Ranger Regiment). On 2 May 1984, the task force was placed under the 11th Strategic Division.

=== Reorganised as a Strategic Defence Brigade ===
On 1 January 1990, Task Force 083 was upgraded back to the strength of a brigade and renamed the 10th Strategic Brigade. During this time, the Communist insurgency in Malaysia (1968–1989) had recently ended. The 11th Strategic Division was tasked by the Army Headquarters (Malay: Markas Tentera Darat) with strategic defence, requiring them to experiment in planning, doctrine, training, and other areas to ensure the Malaysian Army had an advantage in the event of a new armed conflict. In December 1992, the brigade was relocated from Camp Pengkalan Hulu to Camp Terendak in Malacca.

=== Integrated into the Rapid Deployment Force ===
In early 1994, the 10th Strategic Brigade was integrated into a new military unit named the Malaysian Rapid Deployment Force. Simultaneously, the brigade was unofficially upgraded to an airborne brigade. On 10 October 1994, the then Prime Minister of Malaysia, Mahathir Mohamad, officially announced the establishment of Malaysian Armed Forces' Rapid Deployment Forces, and the 10th Strategic Brigade was officially renamed the 10th Parachute Brigade. Simultaneously, the brigade became an independent military formation directly under the command of the Chief of Army, and the 11th Strategic Division was officially dissolved. (Note: The 11th Strategic Division was dissolved, and everything that remained, including staff, facilities, and other assets, was absorbed into the newly established command known as the Malaysian Army Training and Doctrine Command.) As of 2023, the 10th Parachute Brigade is the sole component of the Malaysian Rapid Deployment Force, supported by the Royal Malaysian Air Force and the Royal Malaysian Navy.

=== Upgraded to the status of special operations formation ===
Although initially trained in airborne operations, the battalions under the 10 PARA BDE were originally designated as standard infantry battalions, performing conventional infantry duties. At the time, they were classified by the Malaysian Army as Batalion Infantri Standard or Standard Infantry Battalions in English. However, on 9 October 2020, under the 'ARMY 4NEXTG' plan, General Zamrose Mohd Zain, the Chief of Army, upgraded 10 PARA BDE's status to special operations formation. This transformation relieved them of the conventional infantry roles previously assigned to standard infantry battalions, allowing them to focus on more specialised tasks.

...Pasukan 10 Bgd Para tidak akan melakukan operasi rutin seperti sebelum ini. Kita akan memastikan mereka akan terus berlatih untuk melaksanakan tugas-tugas khusus.

[...The 10th Parachute Brigade will no longer carry out routine (conventional infantry) operations as before. We will ensure that they continue training to carry out special operations.]

— General Zamrose Mohd Zain, during the 10th Parachute Brigade's anniversary press conference on 9 October 2020

With this upgrade, 10 PARA BDE now operates at a level comparable to the United States Army's 75th Ranger Regiment and the British Army's Specialised Infantry Group (now known as the Army Special Operations Brigade). Their primary focus revolves around air assault operations, airborne operations, and amphibious warfare operations with extended capabilities in special operations light infantry roles or functioning as special operations-capable forces.

=== Restructure as a special operations formation with multi-domain capability ===
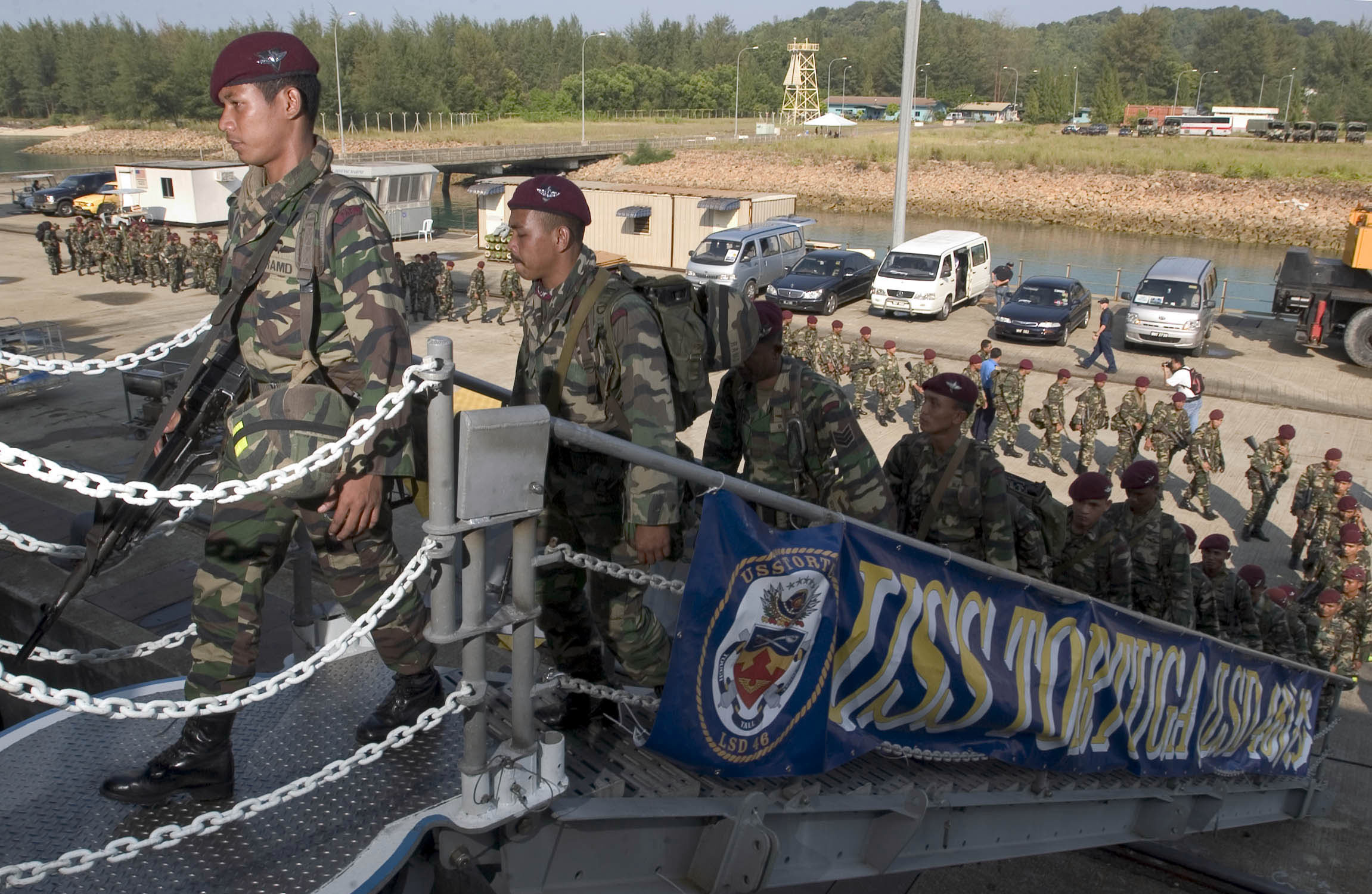
Paratroopers from the 10 PARA BDE boarded the amphibious dock landing ship USS Tortuga (LSD-46) to conduct a beach raiding exercise during the 2006 Cooperation Afloat Readiness and Training (CARAT).

Malaysia, as a nation in maritime Southeast Asia with a 590,000 square kilometres (170,000 sq nmi) maritime zone, realises the importance of an amphibious military unit such as Marines. In 2013, the Malaysian government expressed its desire to establish a marine corps, but they couldn't decide which military service should be in charge of the marine corps. For instance, while most marine units fall under the navy, there are instances where marine units fall under the army, as seen with the Amphibious Rapid Deployment Brigade, a part of the Japan Ground Self-Defense Force.

The 10 PARA BDE has been trained as a substitute for the Marines, since the early 2000s. In June 2002, the 8th Battalion (Parachute), Royal Ranger Regiment (8 RANGER (PARA)), underwent training with the United States Marine Corps. In August 2002, the 8 RANGER (PARA) was deployed to Sabah under Operations PASIR to defend the coastline alongside other Malaysian army units. In 2006, the 10 PARA BDE participated in the CARAT exercise, assuming the role of a Marine unit. Due to conflicts in the South China Sea, in 2022, the Army Headquarters directed the 10 PARA BDE to restructure as a hybrid airborne-marine unit. The new role of the 10 PARA BDE was showcased to the public during the 89th Army Day (Malay: Hari Tentera Darat), with members of the brigade conducting beach raids from the Royal Malaysian Navy's KD Mahawangsa.

=== Potential upgrade to division sized unit ===
On 17 April 2023, the Chief of Army, General Mohammad Ab Rahman, promoted the 10 PARA BDE commander, Brigadier General Khairul Azmizal Ahmad Natal, to the rank of Major General. With this promotion, the 10 PARA BDE was unofficially upgraded to a division-sized military unit. This marks the first time, since the establishment of this brigade, that it is led by a major general. As of 2020, the 10 PARA BDE's members exceed 4800 personnel, falling only short of 200 personnel from the division size according to NATO standards.

=== Integration of amphibious and air assault operations ===
In January 2024, the Chief of Army, General Muhammad Hafizuddeain Jantan, announced future development plans for the Malaysian Army. Several units, including the 10 PARA BDE, were identified for inclusion in these initiatives. For the brigade, the programme is officially designated Way Forward 10 Briged (Para), or 10 PARA BDE's Way Forward. The plan places particular emphasis on enhancing the brigade's capability to conduct amphibious and air assault operations.

To support the implementation of these concepts, the Army Headquarters engaged with the United States Army and the United States Marine Corps, seeking assistance in areas such as exercise planning, organisational structures, force composition, logistics, and asset deployment. By March 2024, a blueprint for the initiative had been finalised, and implementation commenced within the 10th Parachute Brigade.

In December 2024, the first nucleus cadre of instructors and trainers, designated as the Mobile Training Team, was established. Comprising approximately 20 officers and 108 other ranks, the team underwent retraining in amphibious and air assault operations. The Mobile Training Team now serves as the foundation for training future members of the 10th Parachute Brigade in these specialised roles.

In Series 1/2025, the 10 PARA BDE introduced an experimental pilot version of its selection pipeline, incorporating elements of basic amphibious warfare and basic air assault training. This extended the course duration to six weeks. The brigade headquarters is currently planning to test a seven-week version in the upcoming series, with the most effective structure to be adopted as the official standard in the future.

=== Establishment of the Amphibious Boat Company ===
On 1 August 2025, as part of the follow-up to the Way Forward programme, the 10 PARA BDE established a nucleus team for a new amphibious combat formation. The unit, officially designated the Amphibious Boat Company (Malay: Kompeni Bot Amfibi), was created as an experimental element within the brigade to trial the concepts and plans developed since early 2024.

The nucleus team serves as a test-bed for shaping the brigade's future amphibious role and determining the final structure and functions of the unit. Current plans envisage the company being deployed using hovercraft, Offshore Raiding Craft (ORC), and Combat Rubber Raiding Craft (CRRC), with embarkation and support provided by the Royal Malaysian Navy.

=== Timeline ===
- 5 October 1979 – The 10th Infantry Brigade was established at Camp Sungai Besi in Kuala Lumpur.
- October 1979 – The 10th Infantry Brigade moved to Camp Pengkalan Hulu in Perak and became part of the 2nd Infantry Division.
- December 1982 – The 10th Infantry Brigade was reorganised and became Task Force 083.
- 2 May 1984 – Task Force 083 was placed under the 11th Strategic Division.
- November 1984 – Task Force 083 comprised the 8th Battalion of the Ranger Regiment (8 RANGER), which was stationed at Camp Terendak in Malacca.
- 1 January 1987 – The 8 RANGER underwent training as an experimental airborne battalion.
- 1 January 1990 – Task Force 083 was elevated to brigade formation and re-branded as the 10th Strategic Brigade.
- January–November 1992 – Combat support units, including armoured, artillery, engineering, and others, were incorporated into the structure of the 10th Strategic Brigade.
- December 1992 – The 10th Strategic Brigade moved to Camp Terendak in Malacca at the same time that the 9th Battalion and 17th Battalion of the Royal Malay Regiment were assigned to the brigade.
- 1994 – The Malaysian Rapid Deployment Force was informally established, and the 10th Strategic Brigade was assigned to this force.
- 10 October 1994 – Malaysian Prime Minister, Mahathir Mohamad, officially established the Malaysian Rapid Deployment Force, re-designating the 10th Strategic Brigade as the 10th Parachute Brigade.
- 10 October 1994 – The 10 PARA BDE conducts rapid deployment exercises, collaborating with special forces such as the 21st Special Service Group and Naval Special Forces (PASKAL). Operational support is provided by the Royal Malaysian Navy and the Royal Malaysian Air Force. The 1994 Halilintar Exercise (Malay: Eks Halilintar/94) featured a scenario where the Rapid Deployment Force, led by the 8 RANGER (PARA), reclaimed Langkawi International Airport from an invading force.
- 1 June 1999 – The pathfinder and reconnaissance unit for the 10th Parachute Brigade, officially named the Pathfinder Platoon (Para) (Malay: Platun Pandura (Para)), was formally established. This unit, initially created on an ad hoc basis since 1995 as a pathfinder task force, now becomes an official part of the brigade.
- June 2002 – A battalion within the 10th Parachute Brigade underwent marines training with the USMC.
- 21 February 2018 – The 18th Battalion of the Royal Malay Regiment was elevated to an airborne battalion and positioned under the 10th Parachute Brigade. Headquartered at Camp Seberang Takir in Kuala Nerus, Terengganu, this unit is assigned the responsibility of covering the east peninsular region.
- 9 October 2020 – Upgraded to the status of specialised light infantry.
- 2022 – The 10th Parachute Brigade assumed the role of marine forces while awaiting the establishment of the Malaysian version of the Marine Corps by the Malaysian Armed Forces.
- January 2024 – The 10 PARA BDE's Way Forward, future plans for the brigade, was introduced.
- March 2025 – A new selection pipeline for the brigade was introduced.
- 1 August 2025 – The Amphibious Boat Company (Malay: Kompeni Bot Amfibi) was established.

== Roles ==
As of 2023, the 10 PARA BDE has a multi-spectrum of roles. Its original roles are as an airborne and air assault unit for the Malaysian Armed Forces, similar to the British Army's 16 Air Assault Brigade. The amphibious elements were later added, making the 10 PARA BDE a hybrid airborne-marine unit capable of deployment from sea, air, and land. The five primary objectives of the 10 PARA BDE are as follows: (Note: Before its upgrade to specialised light infantry in 2022, the brigade aimed for this objective. Its objectives may vary after 2022.)

1. Operate either independently or as part of a joint force in response to threats occurring within or outside Malaysia.
2. Defend and rescue Malaysian citizens and property located abroad.
3. Assist law enforcement with any threats occurring within Malaysia.
4. Fight insurgency.
5. Assist friendly countries in the event of a natural disaster, defending their citizens, or serving as peacekeepers.

== Identities ==
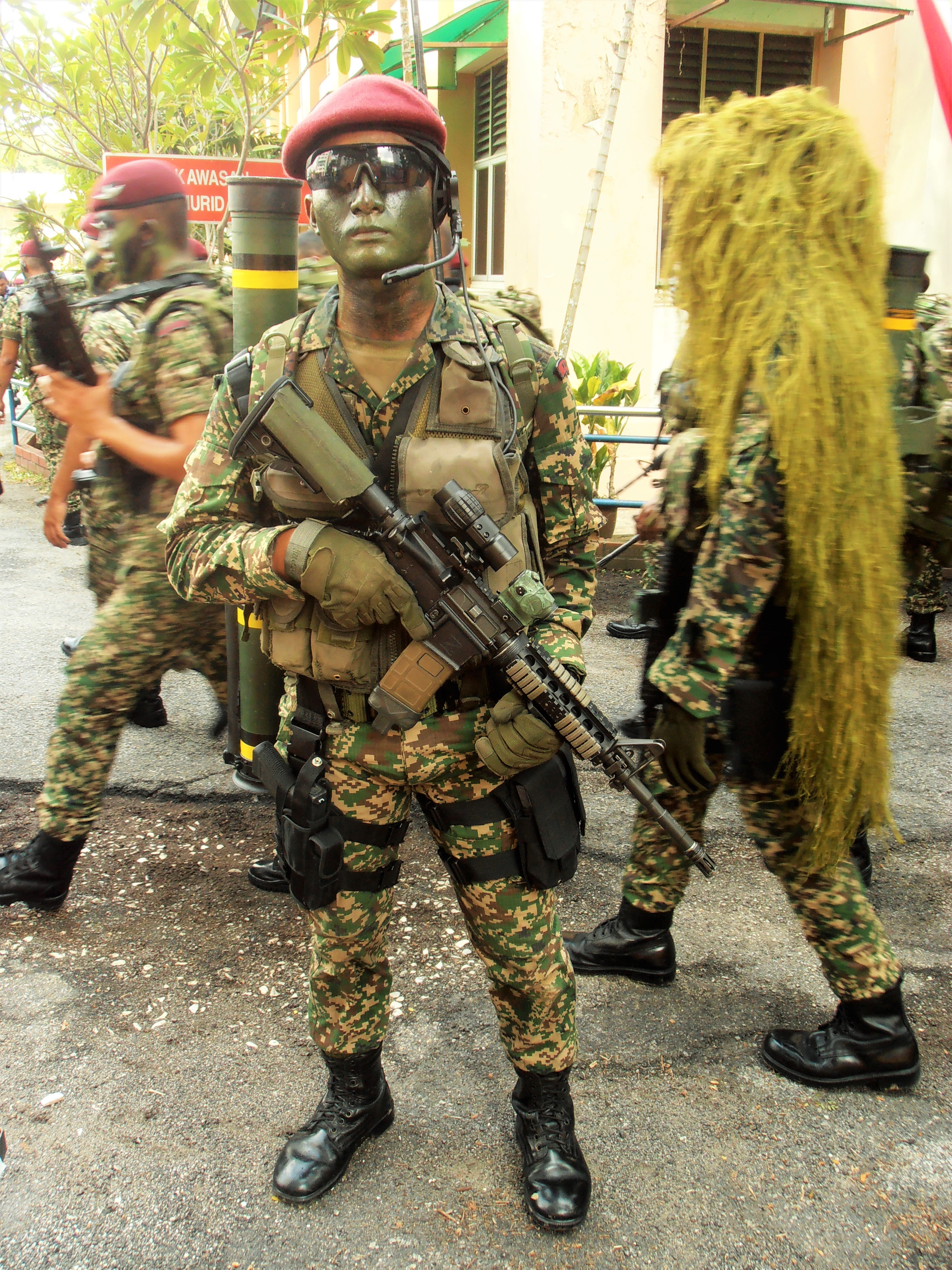
A paratrooper from the 10 PARA BDE of the Malaysian Army is holding his M4A1 carbine. Notice that the beret is worn in a style where the cap badge is not visible from the front. This style of beret is used by all elite units in Malaysia, including the 10 PARA BDE and all special forces. The style was first adopted by Gerak Khas during the Communist insurgency in Malaysia (1968–1989) and was inspired by the Royal Marines Commando Snipers team who served alongside Gerak Khas during the conflict.

=== Maroon beret ===
The maroon beret worn by the 10th Parachute Brigade is known as 'Pegasus'. To qualify for wearing the maroon beret, one must successfully complete both the Basic Parachutist Course and the Basic Rapid Deployment Force Course. This practice is modelled after the British Parachute Regiment, including the style of wearing the beret and the cap badge.

=== Cap badge ===
The insignia consists of parachute wings affixed to a black triangle background, with a Keris, featured prominently and pointing downwards.

=== Parachutist badge ===
The design of the Malaysian military parachutist badge draws inspiration from the Navy and Marine Corps Parachutist Insignia. For members of the 10 PARA BDE, this badge is referred to as 'Sayap Berdarah', translating to 'Blood Wings' in English. During the Blood Wings ceremony, VIPs, typically the Chief of Army or the Commander of 10 PARA BDE, along with instructors, punch the metal parachutist badge into the chests of the graduates. The sharp pins of the wing symbolically induce bleeding, and only those who undergo this ceremony earn the privilege to wear a blood-red background trim (Malay: Pelapik) on the back of their parachutist badge when donning any service uniform, excluding the combat uniform. Other units, like the 21st Special Service Group, if trained in airborne operations, wear the parachutist badge without the background trim.

=== PAC shoulder tab ===
Members of the 10 PARA BDE wear this tab on their left shoulder in both service dress and combat uniforms. The maroon-coloured tab is embroidered with black letters 'PAC', representing the acronym for Pasukan Aturgerak Cepat.

=== Airborne shoulder tab ===
The tab is similar to the US Army 101st Airborne Division tab, with yellow or gold 'AIRBORNE' letters embroidered on a black background. In the Malaysian Army, it is worn on the left shoulder of the service dress uniform. The black and olive version is worn above the tactical formation patches on the combat uniform.

=== Motto ===
Tiada Misi Terlalu Sukar, Tiada Pengorbanan Terlalu Besar, Tugas Diutamakan! (No Mission Too Difficult. No Sacrifice Too Great. Duty First!). The motto is adopted from the motto of the 1st Infantry Division of the United States Army.

== Structures ==
The headquarters of the 10th Parachute Brigade is based at Camp Terendak, Malacca, also known as the 'Home of the Paras'.

Structure of the 10 PARA BDE (2022)

=== Current structure ===
Currently, the 10th Parachute Brigade consists of the following units:

- Headquarters, 10th Parachute Brigade. At Camp Terendak in Malacca
  - 8th Battalion (Parachute), Royal Ranger (Specialised light infantry). At Camp Terendak in Malacca
  - 9th Battalion (Parachute), Royal Malay (Specialised light infantry). At Camp Terendak in Malacca
  - 17th Battalion (Parachute), Royal Malay (Specialised light infantry). At Camp Terendak in Malacca
  - 18th Battalion (Parachute), Royal Malay (Specialised light infantry). At Camp Sri Pantai in Terengganu
  - 1st Artillery Regiment (Parachute), Royal Artillery (Airmobile close support artillery). At Camp Terendak in Malacca
  - Armoured Squadron (Parachute), Royal Armoured (Airmobile mechanised infantry and light armoured fighting vehicle). At Camp Syed Sirajuddin in Negeri Sembilan
  - 10th Signal Squadron (Parachute), Royal Signals (Airmobile communication and information support). At Camp Terendak in Malacca
  - 10th Engineering Squadron (Parachute), Royal Army Engineers (Close support airmobile engineers). At Camp Terendak in Malacca
  - 361st Air Defence Battery (Parachute), Royal Artillery (Close support airmobile anti-aircraft gunners). At Camp Terendak in Malacca
  - 10th Field Workshop Company (Parachute), Royal Electrical & Mechanical Engineers (Close support airmobile engineers). At Camp Terendak in Malacca
  - Pathfinder Company (Para) (Special operations small unit tactics). At Camp Terendak in Malacca
  - Support Company (Parachute) (Airmobile anti-tank, heavy machine gun, grenade machine gun, and light armoured car support). At Camp Terendak in Malacca
  - Medical Company (Parachute), Royal Medicals (Airmobile medical support). At Camp Terendak in Malacca
  - 10th Logistic Company (Parachute), Royal Logistics (Airmobile combat logistics support). At Camp Terendak in Malacca
  - Amphibious Boat Company (Airmobile marine infantry). At Camp Terendak in Malacca
  - Military Police Platoon (Parachute), Royal Military Police (Brigade's law enforcement). At Camp Terendak in Malacca
  - Intelligence Cell of the 10th Parachute Brigade, Royal Intelligence (Military intelligence support). At Camp Terendak in Malacca

*Airmobile: Insertion via parachute (airborne) and helicopters (air assault)

=== Family welfare support ===
10 PARA BDE's BAKAT oversees the family welfare support for the brigade. The organisation is under the leadership of the spouse of the Commander of 10 PARA BDE, with the commander serving as the patron for this organisation.

== Selection and training ==
There are two ways for soldiers in the Malaysian Army to serve in the Malaysian Rapid Deployment Force (RDF) and the 10th Parachute Brigade. The first type is for combat service support, such as logistics, medical, chaplains, and others. These individuals only need to pass the Basic Parachutist Course and qualify as airborne forces. However, soldiers also have the option to challenge themselves by undertaking the full pipeline, culminating in the acquisition of the coveted maroon beret.

The second type is the full pipeline, which is mandatory for those who want to be on the front lines with the combat teams or combat support teams. Officers and soldiers in this category need to go through three courses before being awarded the maroon beret and parachutist badge. These courses, collectively known as the Malaysia Rapid Deployment Force Selection pipeline, are as follows:

=== Preparatory course (2 Weeks) ===
This course, officially known as the 10th Parachute Brigade Induction Programme, lasts for two weeks and is divided into two types. The first type is designed for other ranks, while the second, known as the 10th Parachute Brigade Junior Officer Induction Programme, is tailored for officers.

The course aims to instill discipline, multi-skills, practicality, substance, and action-oriented skills in the candidates. For officers, leadership skills are also included in their curriculum. Throughout the course, candidates undergo physical and mental preparation for subsequent courses in the RDF pipeline. This involves completing a 2.5 kilometres (1.6 mi) run twice a day at 0700 hrs and 1500 hrs. Candidates need to navigate through an obstacle and endurance course known as Endurance Challenge Tachtlon and undergo marksmanship tests as part of their final assessment for this course.

=== Basic Parachutist Course (4 Weeks) ===
This course, also known as jump school or airborne school, is conducted at the Special Warfare Training Centre, Camp Sungai Udang in Malacca. It is compulsory, even for non-combat soldiers such as doctors, nurses, chefs, chaplains, intelligence personnel, and others who are attached to the 10 PARA BDE.

The course is divided into three phases:

==== Phase 1: Theory ====
The first phase lasts for two weeks, during which candidates are instructed in the correct techniques for parachute jumps. They learn how to land, emergency procedures if the main chute does not deploy or fails to open correctly, how to handle collisions in the air, deploying the second chute, maintaining discipline in the aircraft, landing techniques in challenging conditions (such as rough winds or water landings), and the correct method for packing the parachute after landing.

Every Friday, candidates must pass the following physical tests:

- Running 3.2 km (2.0 mi) in under 16 minutes
- Rope climbing to a height of 6 m (20 ft)
- Performing 6 chin-ups
- Completing 32 press-ups in under 1 minute
- Completing 32 sit-ups in under 1 minute
- Buddy-carrying for 100 m (330 ft)

==== Phase 2: Tower week ====
The second phase, lasting for one week, involves testing the theories learned in Phase 1 at a high tower. Each candidate is required to carry 40 kilograms (88 lb) of equipment for each exercise. The exercises include:

- Sitting for 45 minutes in a hot mock aeroplane in full battle equipment
- Jumping from a 32 ft (9.8 m) tower
- Completing an exit tower exercise from a 50 ft (15 m) height

==== Phase 3: Jump week ====
The final phase of the Basic Parachutist Course, known as the Jump Week, involves candidates being sent to a selected airport. The airport and drop zones are not fixed, with known drop zones including Gong Kedak in Kelantan, Padang Terap in Kedah, and Pontian in Johor. During this week, candidates are required to complete eight jumps, with at least two jumps performed in full battle equipment. In some cases, only seven jumps are needed if weather conditions do not permit. Non-full RDF pipeline candidates receive their parachutist badge in a small graduation ceremony after the last jump, while full RDF pipeline candidates move on to the next course.

=== Basic Rapid Deployment Force Course (6+ Weeks) ===
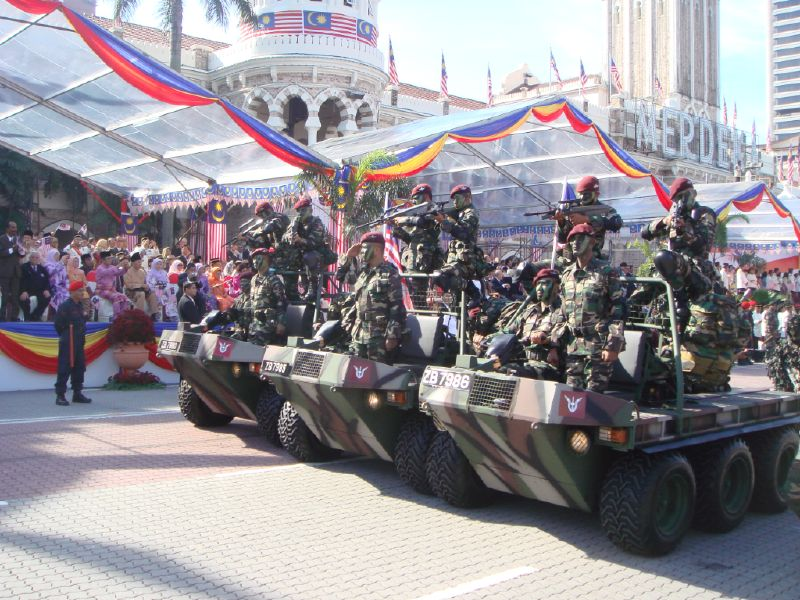
Paratroopers of 10 PARA BDE with Supacat vehicle.

The course, officially known as Kursus Asas Pasukan Aturgerak Cepat (Kursus APAC), is conducted at various locations where units of the 10th Parachute Brigade are based. It was originally held at the Perkampungan Gempita Para ("Airborne Combat Village") in Camp Terendak, Malacca. In later years, the course was decentralised, with responsibility for its conduct rotated among the brigade's units. At present, it is primarily conducted in two locations: Terengganu, where the 18th Battalion Royal Malay Regiment (Para) is garrisoned, and Malacca, which hosts the majority of the brigade's units.

The course initially lasted four weeks but was extended to six weeks beginning with Series 1/2025, following the expansion of the brigade's role to include air assault and amphibious operations. Experimental adjustments are ongoing, with a possible extension to seven weeks in future series; the final course length will be determined after evaluation. Previously, air assault and amphibious training were considered advanced and non-compulsory, with candidates only required to go through the theory during selection. These elements have since been integrated into the basic syllabus.

The primary objective of the course is to develop the mental and physical resilience of paratroopers, foster esprit de corps, and reinforce the "Buddy System" as a core principle. Often compared to the United States Army's Ranger Assessment and Selection Programme (RASP), the course serves as the Malaysian Army's equivalent gateway to elite airborne service.

The course is also known as Latihan Semangat Waja ("Iron Will Training") and the Pegasus Course. It is divided into two phases, designed to progressively test and evaluate candidates' combat readiness.

==== Phase 1: Camp phase ====
During this phase, candidates undergo both theoretical and practical training to prepare them for the subsequent phase and their roles within the Malaysian RDF and the 10 PARA BDE. The theories they learn encompass:

- Airborne Operations: Understanding the principles and tactics involved in parachute-assisted military operations, covering both strategic and tactical aspects of airborne assaults
- Amphibious Operations: Learning the strategies and techniques used in military operations that involve both land and water elements, emphasising versatility in deployment.
- Air Assault Operations: Gaining knowledge and skills related to rapid deployment and assault via helicopters or other air assets, with a focus on speed and flexibility.

==== Phase 2: Field phase ====
Conducted outside the military camp, the Field Phase is the 10 PARA BDE's version of the United States Navy SEAL's 'Hell Week'. (Note: This phase spans about one week almost the same length as the US Navy Seals'. The training, challenge and exercise of both Hell Week maybe different but the objective is the same which is to make elite military personnel.) During this phase, candidates undergo a series of demanding challenges designed to assess their physical and mental fortitude. The field phase includes amphibious infiltration, jungle warfare with small unit tactics, long-distance loaded marching by foot, land navigation tests, climbing and ascending mountains, swimming and river crossing, and survival in swamps.

Throughout this phase, all theories and training acquired in Phase 1 are put to the test. The field phase simulates real-world conditions, ensuring candidates can apply their knowledge and skills effectively in challenging operational scenarios.

==== Phase 3: Air assault and amphibious training ====
The air assault and amphibious phase was introduced in 2025 as part of the expanded role of the 10th Parachute Brigade under the Way Forward plan. In this phase, candidates apply the knowledge acquired during earlier stages of training through practical air assault and amphibious operations.

Trainees undergo the Basic Amphibious Warfare Course and the Basic Air Assault Course, which were previously considered advanced and non-compulsory qualifications. The amphibious component is conducted in coastal and beach environments, where candidates train in basic beach raiding tactics and other littoral operations.

The air assault component is conducted at designated training facilities, including tower-based sites where candidates learn insertion techniques such as fast-roping. Plans are in place to incorporate training with real helicopters, providing candidates with live air assault experience. Should this be implemented, the overall course length may be extended from six to seven weeks, although the final structure and duration remain under review by brigade headquarters.

==== Graduation ====
The graduation ceremony, originally conducted at Parawood, Camp Terendak, underwent a significant change in 2022. Originally, trainees would swim approximately 100 metres (330 ft) in murky water, carrying their weapons and equipment, before being bestowed with the maroon beret and the blood wing as symbols of their graduation. The ceremony would conclude with the recitation of the para oath and a para war dance performed by the graduates.

However, since 2022, the graduation ceremony has evolved to include a beach raiding exercise. Graduates now participate in this exercise before being officially bestowed with the maroon beret and the blood wing.

=== Advanced training ===
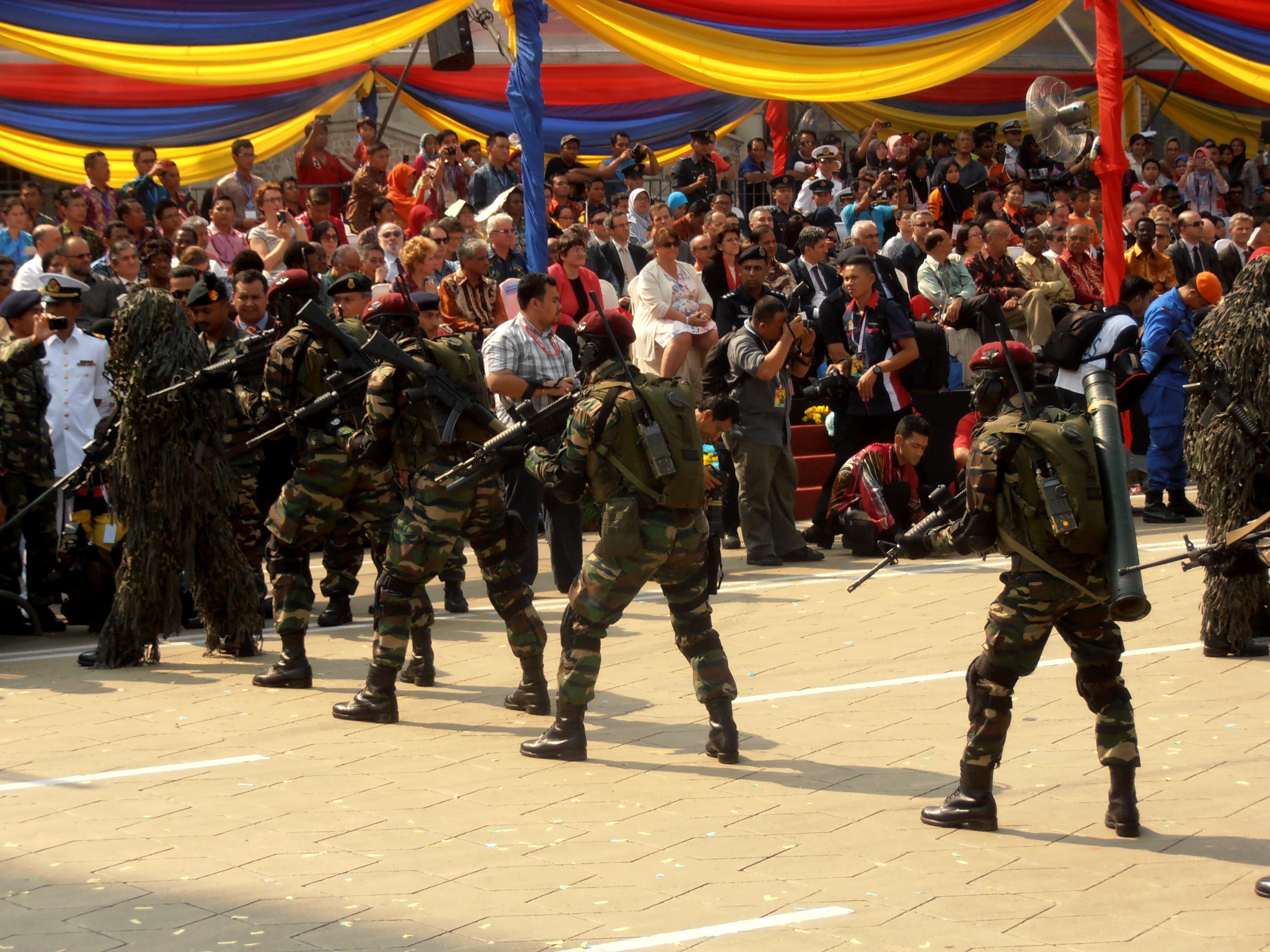
Paratroopers from 10 PARA BDE in demonstration for the 56th Merdeka Day parade.

After graduating from the RDF pipeline, new members are required to undergo compulsory advanced training courses tailored to their specific specialities within the 10th Parachute Brigade. For instance, graduates assigned to specialised light infantry combat units, like the 9th Battalion (Parachute), Royal Malay Regiment, must complete three additional advanced courses:

1. Rifleman Class II Marksmanship Course (4 weeks)
2. Rifleman Class I Marksmanship Course (4 weeks)
3. Military Hand-to-Hand Combat Course (2 weeks)

In addition to the compulsory training, members of the 10 PARA BDE have the opportunity to advance their skills by participating in advanced courses offered by the Malaysian Armed Forces. They can also strive to join the 10 PARA BDE's special operations unit, the Pathfinder Company (Para). Several veteran paratroopers from the 10 PARA BDE have chosen to undergo Special Forces Selection.

Some of the advanced/specialist training courses include:

- Tactical Air Landing Operations (TALO)
- Free Fall
- Close Quarters Combat (CQC)
- Vehicle driver
- HALO/HAHO
- Sniper
- Demolition expert
- Sharpshooters
- Pathfinder
- Airborne combat medic

== Equipment ==
Name	Type	Origin	Notes
Beretta 92FS	Semi-automatic pistol	(Italy)	
Browning HP Mk.3	Semi-automatic pistol	(Belgium)	Out in service
Glock	Semi-automatic pistol	(Austria)	Glock 18 and Glock 26.
Heckler & Koch P9S	Semi-automatic pistol	(Germany)	Out in service
SIG Sauer P226	Semi-automatic pistol	(Switzerland)	
Remington 870	Shotgun	(United States)	
Beretta PMX	Submachine gun	(Italy)	
Heckler & Koch MP5	Submachine gun	(Germany)	MP5A3 and MP5SD3.
Colt M4A1	Assault rifle	(United States)	
Colt M16A1 Model 653	Assault rifle	(United States)	Out in service
Colt M16A4	Assault rifle	(United States)	
Accuracy International Arctic Warfare	Sniper rifle	(United Kingdom)	
Barrett M107	Anti-material rifle	(United States)	
Harris Gun Works M-96	Anti-material rifle	(United States)	
FN MAG 58	Machinegun	(Belgium)	
FN Minimi Mk.2	Machinegun	(Belgium)	
Heckler & Koch HK11	Machinegun	(Germany)	
M203 grenade launcher	Grenade launcher	(United States)	
Mk 19 grenade launcher	Grenade launcher	(United States)	
Milkor MGL	Grenade launcher	(South Africa)	
MBDA Eryx	Anti-tank	(France)	
NLAW	Anti-tank	(United Kingdom)	
M72 LAW	Anti-tank	(United States)	
Anza	Anti-aircraft missile	(Pakistan)	Anza Mk 1 and Anza Mk 2.

== Para oath ==
Kami berikrar bahawa kami, sentiasa mentaati Rukun Negara dan Ikrar Kesatria.
Kami berikrar bahawa kami, dengan kemahuan kami sendiri, diterjunkan dan melaksanakan tugas parajurit para.
Kami berikrar bahawa kami menjunjung tinggi dan mempertahankan darjat, nama, kehormatan dan jiwa parajurit para.
Kami berikrar bahawa kami, sentiasa bersiap sedia untuk diterjunkan pada setiap saat, di mana jua, dan dalam keadaan apa sekalipun.
Kami berikrar bahawa kami, sentiasa bersikap sopan dan menurut perintah dengan ikhlas dan jujur.

"We pledge that we always obey the Rukun Negara and the Warriors' Pledge.
We pledge that, with our own will, we jump and carry out the duties of the paratroopers.
We pledge that we uphold and defend the ranks, names, honours, and souls of the paratroopers.
We pledge that we are always ready to jump at any time, anywhere, and in whatever circumstances.
We pledge that we will always be polite and sincerely and honestly carry out all orders given to us."

== Future plans ==
=== Amphibious assets ===
Under the 2024 Way Forward programme, Army Headquarters outlined plans to restructure the 10th Parachute Brigade (10 PARA BDE) into a dynamic, multi-role formation with the ability to conduct operations across sea, air, and land. The brigade is intended to serve as a rapidly deployable force capable of insertion from multiple domains.

To support these roles, several amphibious assets have been requisitioned, including hovercraft, Offshore Raiding Craft (ORC), and Combat Rubber Raiding Craft (CRRC). The brigade is scheduled to receive six Hovercraft Kaiman, to be built in Malaysia through a partnership between Airlift Hovercraft (Australia) and IDC Technologies (Malaysia). The locally built variant will be designated the Hovercraft Salamander, with delivery planned to begin in October 2025.

As of August 2025, no official specifications have been released regarding the ORC and CRRC models intended for the brigade. With the integration of these assets, the likelihood of establishing a separate Malaysian Marine Corps has diminished, as the 10th Parachute Brigade is expected to fulfil the amphibious role within the Malaysian Army.

=== Potential name changes ===
As the brigade's capabilities expand beyond its traditional airborne role, consideration has been given to renaming the formation in order to reflect its multi-domain operational role. Proposed changes remain under discussion as part of the wider Way Forward programme.

== Recent operations ==
The unit has been deployed in the following operations:

Operation	Country	Year
Malaysian Medical Team (MASMEDTIM), Chaman	Pakistan	2002
MASMEDTIM, Kashmir	Pakistan	2005
MASMEDTIM, Acheh	Indonesia	2004–2005
Operation PADANAN SIPADAN ISLAND RESORT (Ops Pasir), Sabah	Malaysia	2002–present
Operation Astute	Timor-Leste	2006
MALCON-UNIFIL	Lebanon	2007–present
Genting Sempah Incident	Malaysia	2007
MALCON-ISAF	Afghanistan	2011–2014
Ops Daulat	Malaysia	2013

Malaysian Medical Team, Pakistan

On 14 October 2005, members of the Malaysian Medical Team (MasMedTim) serving in Battagram, Pakistan, were recommended to receive a daily service allowance of RM100 in recognition of their challenging conditions. The team had been deployed to support relief efforts following the devastating 2005 Kashmir earthquake, and by 26 October, they had established a field hospital in Battagram, located roughly 250 kilometres (160 mi) from Islamabad.

Despite their commitment, the team faced severe hardships. They were equipped with tropical tents and kerosene heaters, which were poorly suited to the subzero temperatures of the mountainous region. Nighttime temperatures often dropped to −7 °C (19 °F), and soldiers had to carry out their duties without adequate winter clothing or access to hot water. These harsh conditions persisted for over two months, making their humanitarian mission both physically and mentally demanding.

Operation "Padanan, Sipadan Island Resort"

The security surveillance, code-named Operation Padanan Sipadan Island Resort, or Ops Pasir, which was launched on 20 September 2000, following the hostage-taking incidents in Sipadan and Pandanan islands, had restored confidence among tourists to visit the resort islands. The integrated operation involved the Malaysian army, navy, and air force, as well as other related agencies such as the police and the coast guard.

== The Chief of Army as patron ==
As a military formation that sits directly under the Chief of Army, the Chief of Army is traditionally selected to become the patron of the 10th Parachute Brigade. Every new Chief of Army is given a maroon beret and blood wings upon their visit to Camp Terendak as a symbol of honorary membership in the airborne brotherhood.

== Commanders ==
No.	Portrait	Commander of 10 PARA BDE	Took office	Left office	Time in office	Ref.
17	Dato' Tengku Muhammad Fauzi Tengku Ibrahim	Brigadier General; Dato' Tengku Muhammad Fauzi Tengku Ibrahim	17 March 2016	22 October 2018	2 years, 219 days	
18	Khairul Azmizal Ahmad Natal	Brigadier General; Khairul Azmizal Ahmad Natal	23 October 2018	18 July 2019	268 days	First term
19	Hj Semaon Hj Marjuki	Brigadier General; Hj Semaon Hj Marjuki	19 July 2019	28 October 2020	1 year, 101 days	
20	Datuk Khairul Azmizal Ahmad Natal	Major General; Datuk Khairul Azmizal Ahmad Natal	29 October 2020	4 February 2025	4 years, 98 days	Second term
21	Khairul Anwar Soib	Brigadier General; Khairul Anwar Soib	5 February 2025	Incumbent	1 year, 249 days	

== Honorary maroon beret ==
As the second most prestigious beret in the Malaysian Army, only after the green beret of Gerak Khas, the maroon beret of 10 PARA BDE is honorarily awarded to high-ranking individuals, military or government officials, and foreign VIPs. In Malaysia, the honorary beret is part of the official military attire.

Among the recipients are:

- King Hamad bin Isa Al Khalifa, King of Bahrain, received it in May 2017.
- Sultan Nazrin Shah, Sultan of Perak, received it in August 2014.
- Sultan Sallehuddin, Sultan of Kedah, received it in February 2018.
- Crown Prince Al-Muhtadee Billah, Crown Prince of Brunei, received it in November 2013.
- Crown Prince Tengku Amir Shah. Crown Prince of Selangor, received it in March 2017. Tengku Amir is a graduate of Basic Rapid Deployment Force Course Series 2/2016. He held the rank of Leftenan Muda (Second Lieutenant) in 17 RAMD (Para) when he received the beret.
- Najib Razak, Prime Minister of Malaysia, received it in October 2003.
- Hishammuddin Hussein, Malaysian Minister of Defence, received it in July 2013.
- General Ismail Omar, Malaysian Chief of Defence Force, was the first recipient.
- General Suraphong Suwana-adth, Thailand Chief of Defence Forces, received it in May 2017.
- General Songwit Noonpackdee, Thailand Chief of Defence Forces, received it in October 2023.
- Major General Aminan Mahmud, Commander of the Royal Brunei Armed Forces, received it in March 2014.
- General Ismail Hassan, former Malaysian Chief of Army, was the second recipient.
- General Mohd Zahidi Zainuddin, former Malaysian Chief of Army, was the third recipient.
- General Udomdej Sitabutr, Commander-in-Chief of the Royal Thai Army, received it in March 2015.
- General Chalermchai Sitthisad, Commander-in-Chief of the Royal Thai Army, received it in April 2017.
- General Apirat Kongsompong, Commander-in-Chief of the Royal Thai Army, received it in January 2020.
- General George Toisutta, Chief of Staff of the Indonesian Army, received it on 11 May 2010.
- General Budiman, Chief of Staff of the Indonesian Army, received it in October 2013.
- Major General Chan Chun Sing, Singapore Chief of Army, received it in September 2010.

== Killed in the line of duty ==
Rank	Name	Unit	Year of Death	Circumstances
Private	Awanis Othman	Salary and Budget Department, Headquarters Company	31 July 1998	During a basic free fall course training exercise at Camp Terendak, Malacca, Private Awanis was involved in a fatal accident. On her third jump out of eleven in the course, witnesses reported that Private Awanis's parachute malfunctioned and failed to deploy. Sergeant Ali Ahmad of the RMAF Special Forces, acting as the skydiving instructor, exited the Nuri aircraft after Private Awanis. He attempted to reach her in mid-air and deploy a parachute for both of them. The tragic delay in Sergeant Ali's parachute deployment caused a fatal outcome for both individuals.
Ranger	Norizan Abdul Rahman	8th Battalion (Parachute), Royal Ranger Regiment	15 August 2001	Fatality from a pulmonary hemorrhage during Operation KOTA Foxtrot Series 2/2001 in Gerik, Perak.
Ranger	Siti Hajar Yakub	8th Battalion (Parachute), Royal Ranger Regiment	2 December 2007	A parachute incident occurred during preparations for the Langkawi International Maritime and Aerospace Exhibition show. Strong winds encountered during a static line jump diverted approximately fourteen paratroopers from the designated landing zone. These paratroopers landed either in the swamp area or in the sea. On arrival, the rescue team confirmed the deaths of three paratroopers by drowning.
Private	Nurul Wahida Mohamad Yunus	17th Battalion (Parachute), Royal Malay Regiment	2 December 2007	A parachute incident occurred during preparations for the Langkawi International Maritime and Aerospace Exhibition show. Strong winds encountered during a static line jump diverted approximately fourteen paratroopers from the designated landing zone. These paratroopers landed either in the swamp area or in the sea. On arrival, the rescue team confirmed the deaths of three paratroopers by drowning.
Private	Raymond Duncan	Armoured Squadron (Parachute), Royal Armoured Corps	2 December 2007	A parachute incident occurred during preparations for the Langkawi International Maritime and Aerospace Exhibition show. Strong winds encountered during a static line jump diverted approximately fourteen paratroopers from the designated landing zone. These paratroopers landed either in the swamp area or in the sea. On arrival, the rescue team confirmed the deaths of three paratroopers by drowning.
Corporal	Mohamad Safuan Hassan	8th Battalion (Parachute), Royal Ranger Regiment	25 June 2018	Fatality due to a falling tree during Operation KOTA Foxtrot Series 2/2018 in Gerik, Perak.
Lance corporal	Fahrurozi Abd Manaf	8th Battalion (Parachute), Royal Ranger Regiment	25 June 2018	Fatality due to a falling tree during Operation KOTA Foxtrot Series 2/2018 in Gerik, Perak.
Corporal	Mohamad Azrin Mohamad Isa	Pathfinder Company	1 September 2021	Lance Corporal Azrin went missing on 29 August 2021, while participating in infiltration training while tactically swimming across the Pahang River during Exercise Para Predator Series 1/2021. On 1 September 2021, his body was discovered 75 kilometres (47 mi) away from where he was last seen. He was a member of Pathfinder Company's Recon Platoon. On 2 September 2021, he was posthumously promoted to the rank of Corporal.

== In popular culture ==
Books, television, and movies featuring the 10th Parachute Brigade:

- 2010: "Delta Two Bar" is a telemovie by RTM that tells the story of the son of a veteran of the Malaysian Communist Insurgency War, who is currently serving with the 10th Parachute Brigade.
- 2016: "Majalah 3: Wira Semerah Hati" is a documentary by TV3, produced by Nurul Fariha Onn, which aired on 29 May 2016. It explores the operations of the 10th Parachute Brigade and won the 2016 Anugerah Skrin award in the documentary category.
- 2017: "Panorama: Sayap Berdarah" is a documentary by RTM that highlights the operations of the 10th Parachute Brigade. It was aired on 5 September 2017.
- 2019: "Leftenan Zana" is a television drama directed by Sheila Rusly and produced by JS Pictures for TV3, starring Janna Nick, Redza Rosli, and Sheila Rusly. The series follows the story of the youngest daughter of a retired army officer who aspires to follow in her father's footsteps. Despite strong opposition from her family, she secretly joins basic training and eventually becomes an EOD officer and paratrooper in the 10th Engineering Squadron (Parachute) of the 10th Parachute Brigade. The show also portrays her journey through training. It premiered on 7 February 2019.

== See also ==
- Elite Forces of Malaysia
  - Malaysian Army 21st Special Service Group
  - Royal Malaysian Navy PASKAL
  - Royal Malaysian Air Force PASKAU
  - Malaysia Coast Guard Special Task and Rescue
  - Royal Malaysia Police Pasukan Gerakan Khas
