= 18th Battalion (Parachute), Royal Malay Regiment =

- Batalion ke-18, Rejimen Askar Melayu Diraja (Para)
- Founded: 1 May 1976 (50 years ago)
- Country: Malaysia
- Allegiance: Yang di-Pertuan Agong ('King of Malaysia')
- Branch: Malaysian Army
- Type: Airborne infantry
- Size: Airborne operations; Air assault; Raid
- Part of: 10th Parachute Brigade
- Garrison: Camp Sri Pantai, Seberang Takir, Terengganu
- Nicknames: "Singa Para" ('Airborne lions'), "Aslan"
- Motto: Tangkas Berjuang ('Agile to fight')
- Colours: Light blue and dark blue
- Engagements: MALCON II-IFOR, Bosnia and Herzegovina (1996)
- Website: @18RAMD (Official social media)

Commanders
- Current commander: Lieutenant Colonel Mohd Zaki Jusoh

The 18th Battalion (Parachute), Royal Malay Regiment (Malay: Batalion ke-18, Rejimen Askar Melayu Diraja (Payung Terjun)), abbreviated 18 RAMD (Para) from its local name, is a battalion-sized airborne infantry unit of the Malaysian Army's Royal Malay Regiment. The 18 RAMD is the newest conventional infantry unit to be promoted to an airborne unit, and they have now officially been part of the Malaysian Army's elite 10 Parachute Brigade since 21 February 2018.

== History ==
=== Formed as an infantry battalion ===
The 18 RAMD was formed during communist insurgency as an infantry battalion on 1 May 1976, in Camp Segenting, Port Dickson. In February 1996, 18 RAMD were assigned to the MALCON II-IFOR peacekeeping mission in Bosnia and Herzegovina. On 10 April 1999, 18 RAMD was reassigned to the 8th Infantry Brigade and relocated to Camp Sri Pantai, Seberang Takir in Terengganu.

=== Restructured as an airborne unit ===
The Malaysian Army Command sought a suitable infantry unit outside of the current airborne units to be transformed into a new airborne unit. The Army Command considered the Camp Sri Pantai, (Note: Locals commonly refer to the Camp Sri Pantai as the "Camp Seberang Takir".) which is close to the Sultan Mahmud Airport, and chose the unit headquartered there, 18 RAMD, to be converted to an airborne role. The first batch of 18 RAMD's was sent to the Special Warfare Training Centre on 28 October 2015, to receive basic parachute training. The 18 RAMD was redesignated as the 18th Battalion (Parachute) of the Royal Malay Regiment on 10 September 2015. On 27 April 2017, 140 paratroopers from 18 RAMD participated in Exercise Lion Warrior Siri 1/2017 to prepare themselves to be a part of the Malaysian Rapid Deployment Force.

On 21 February 2018, Tan Sri Zulkiple Kassim, the then-Chief of the Army, officially acknowledged the 18th Battalion (Parachute), Royal Malay Regiment as part of the 10th Parachute Brigade and Rapid Deployment Forces.

== Role and responsibilities ==
The 18 RAMD (Para), like the other airborne infantry in the 10th Parachute Brigade, is expected to be able to deploy at any time and to any place by air, land, or sea. Their responsibilities are as follows:

1. Operate conventionally, either independently or as part of a joint force, in response to threats that occur within or outside of Malaysia.
2. Defending and rescuing Malaysian citizens and property located abroad.
3. Assisting law enforcement with any threats that occur within Malaysia.
4. Fight the insurgency.
5. Assisting friendly countries in the event of a natural disaster, defending their citizens, or serving as a peacekeeper.
