= Combat Rubber Raiding Craft =

Rubberised fabric tactical inflatable boat used by the US Navy

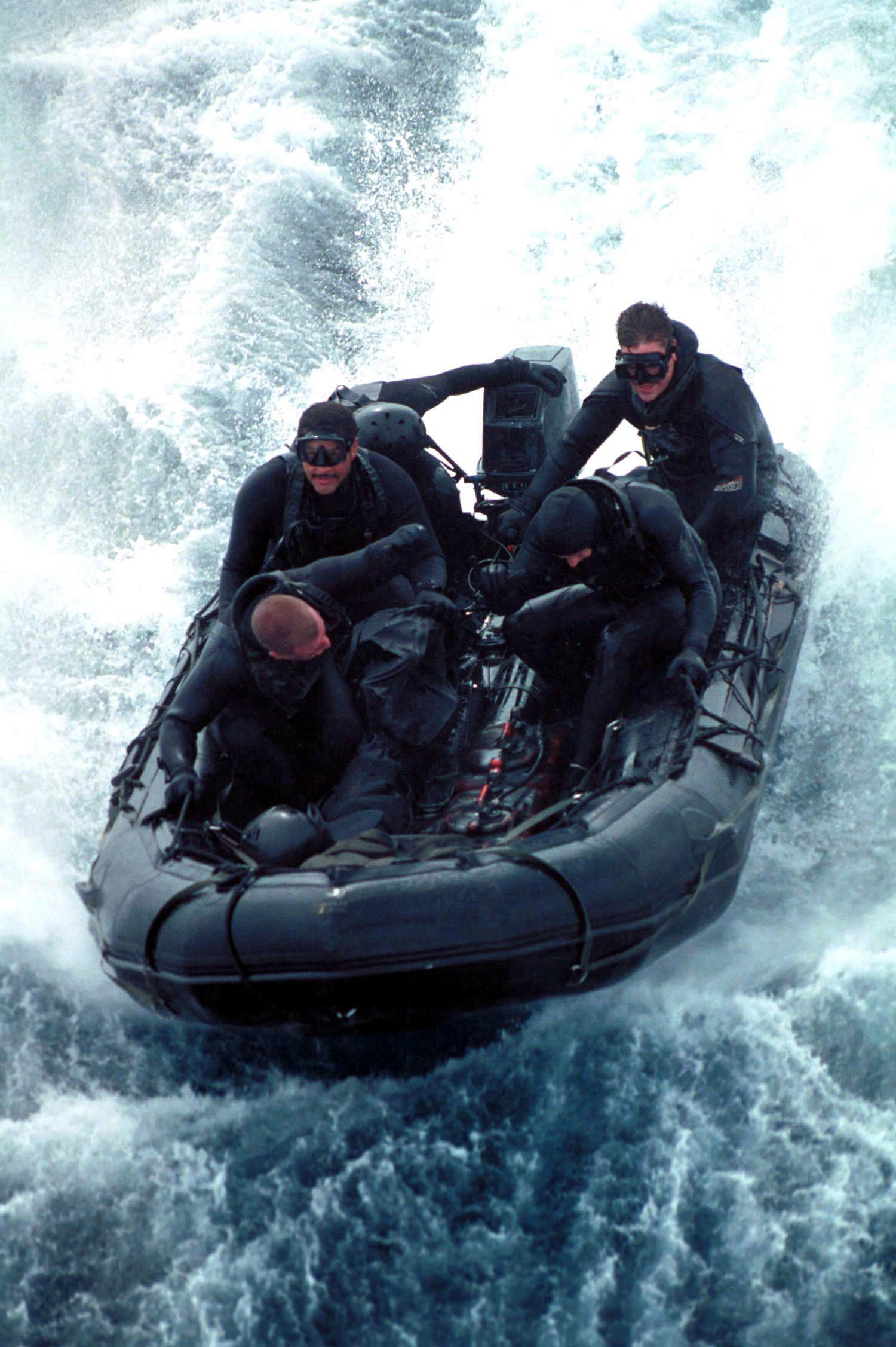
A CRRC manned by U.S. Navy SEALs from SEAL Team 5 during an exercise in 2000.

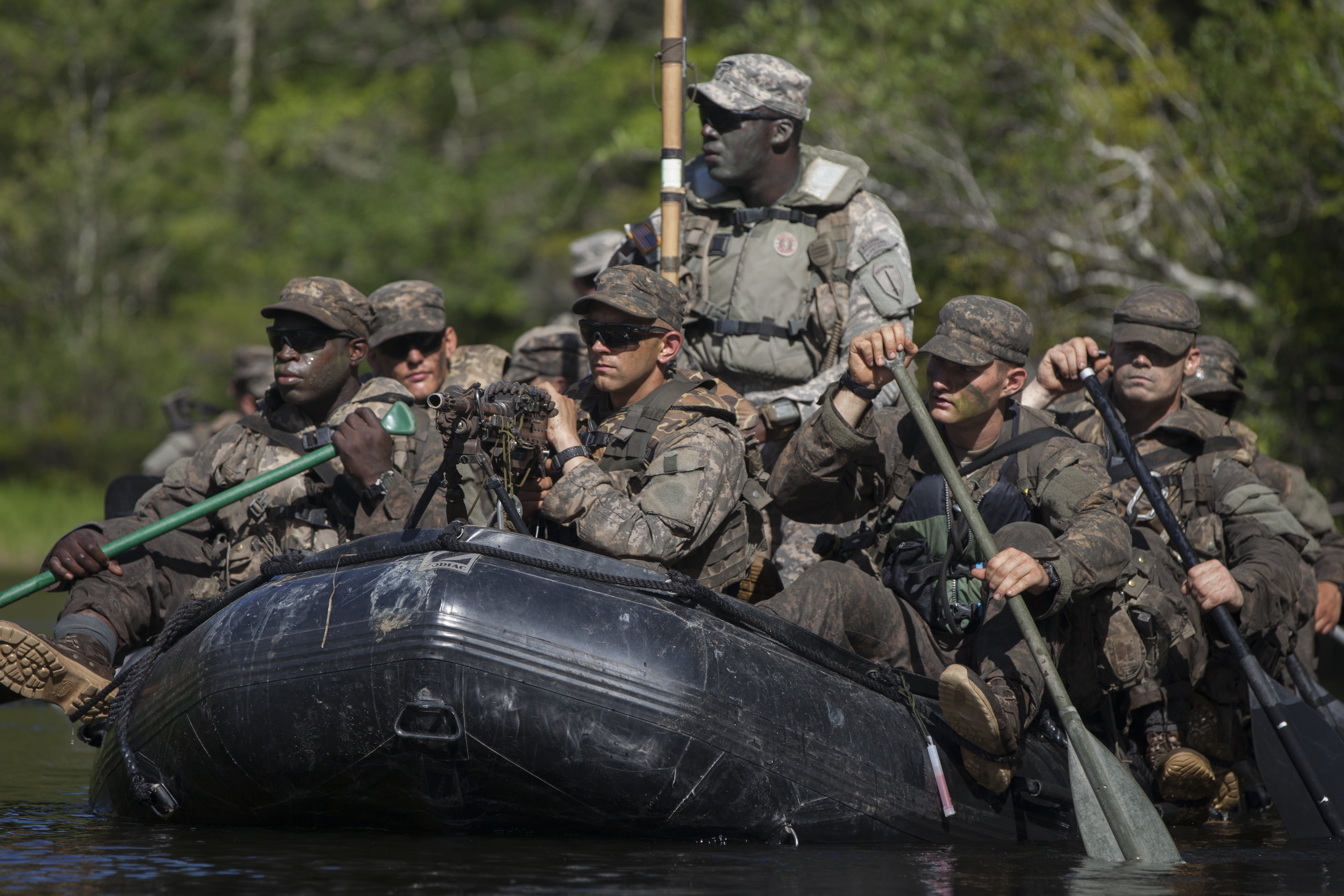
U.S. Army soldiers paddle their CRRC down a river to start their waterborne training mission during the Swamp Phase of Ranger School.

The Zodiac Milpro Futura Commando 470, designated as the Combat Rubber Reconnaissance Craft or the Combat Rubber Raiding Craft (CRRC), is a specially-fabricated rubber inflatable boat in widespread use by the U.S. military. The CRRC is typically simply referred to as a "Zodiac", referring to the boat's manufacturer, Zodiac Milpro.

== Function ==
The boat can be used for over-the-horizon transportation, inserting lightly armed raiding parties or reconnaissance teams onto beaches, piers, offshore facilities and larger vessels. The CRRC can be inflated in minutes by foot pump, compressor or CO_{2} tank and can be deployed from shore and a variety of vessels. Additionally, it can be launched from several types of aircraft and submarines equipped with a special lockout chamber or a Dry Deck Shelter. Its chief advantages are light weight, compact size when stowed, stealth, versatility, and the safety imparted by its super-buoyant nature (which gives it the ability to operate in relatively high seas).

A total of eight individual airtight chambers comprise the FC470. The main hull or gunwale contains five intercommunicating chambers, which are separated by internal baffles and valves. This means that a single leak will not result in loss of pressure throughout the boat, and that air can be bled between chambers to compensate for loss in one. Two additional chambers, located below the gunwale on either side and called "speed skags," provide cushioning for the boat's occupants and additional buoyancy in case of pressure loss in the hull. The final chamber is an inflatable keel tube which runs the length of the craft and gives the bottom of the hull a "V" shape, imparting directional stability and additional shock absorption. A wooden "transom" board at the stern provides a mounting point for the outboard engine(s). The deck (floor) is composed of four interlocking aluminum plates, which are fixed to the "thrust board" at the bow end and the transom at the stern. This rigid structure, spanning the entire internal area of the boat, prevents the hull from collapsing or "taco-ing" under power.

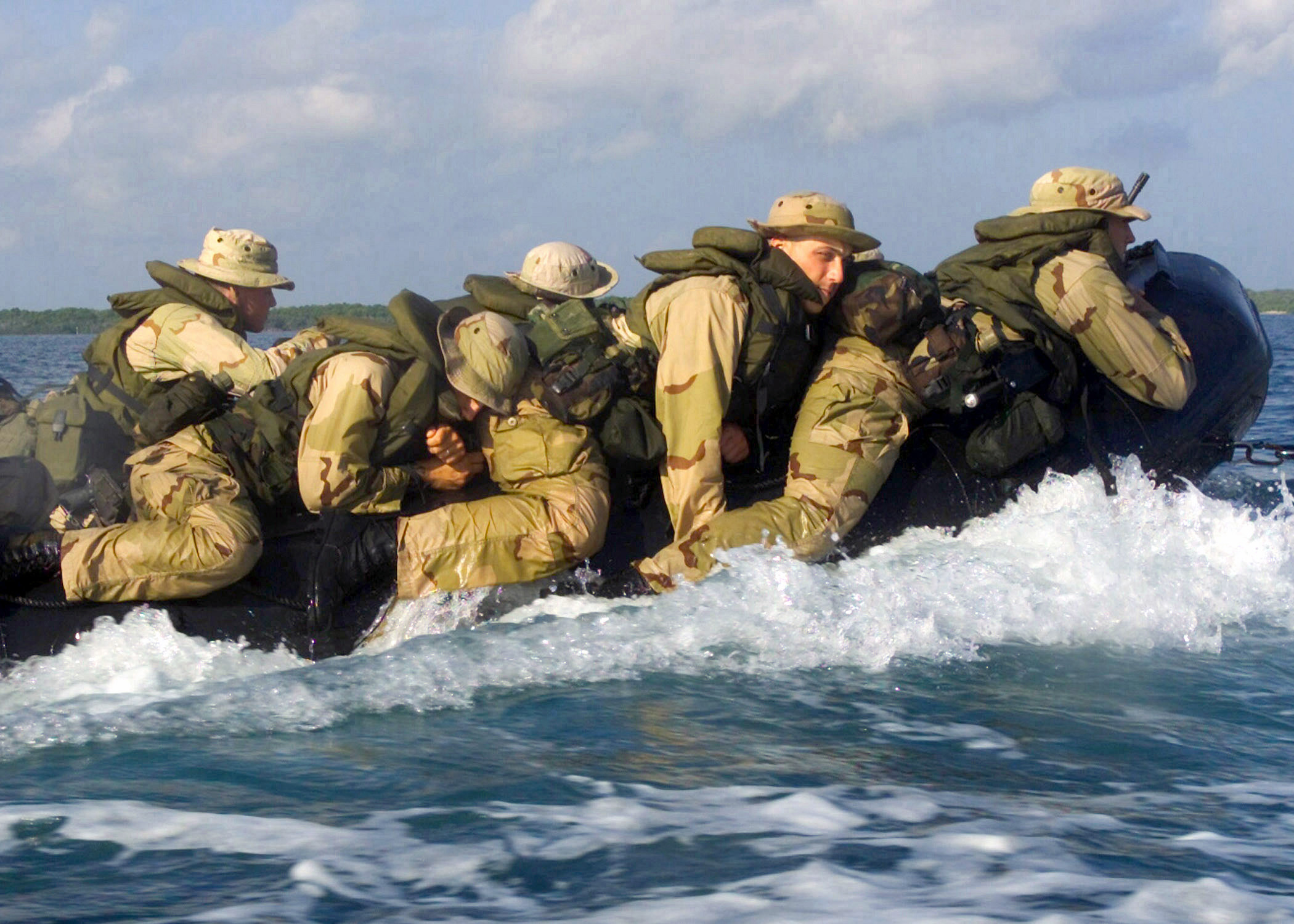
U.S. Marines from the Battalion Landing Team 2/2 go ashore in a CRRC during a 2003 exercise.

A ready-for-use craft includes an outboard engine (two in some configurations); removable aluminium deckplates or roll-up slatted decking; paddles; a bow line for securing the docked boat and a "righting" line which is used to flip the boat in the event of capsizing. At the bow of the boat are storage bags for equipment (foot pumps, extra lines, etc.) and a special fuel bladder, which can be of either 6- or 18-gallon capacity and which feeds the engine via a flexible hose. Deflated and rolled up, the boat and all necessary equipment can easily fit into the bed of a small pickup. Most military CRRCs use a 55 horsepower (41 kW) two-stroke engine with a pump-jet propulsor, which consists of a shrouded impeller. This design reduces the risk of serious injury to personnel in the water when compared to the traditional open propeller. It also reduces the risk of the propulsion system being seriously damaged by submerged objects.

A specially-trained coxswain sits at the stern (rear) of the boat and controls it via the tiller arm, attached to an outboard engine. The coxswain is considered the commander of the craft and is ultimately responsible for its operation, regardless of whether a senior-ranking individual is on board. Across from him sits the assistant coxswain, who relays hand signals from other boats and aids the coxswain as required. The remaining passengers (six raiders plus the two coxswains make up a full team) normally lay on and straddle the gunwale, keeping a low silhouette to help avoid detection and leaving room on the deck for weapons, equipment and (if necessary) additional fuel bladders.

Because the CRRC offers no protection to its occupants and is itself highly vulnerable to small-arms fire, operations involving it almost always take place at night and depend on the elements of stealth and surprise. To alleviate this, Zodiac introduced ArmorFlate, the world's first inflatable bulletproof system for inflatable boats, in 2002. It can be installed on the Zodiac FC470 and inflates in 40 seconds.

== Specifications ==
- Length 4.7 metres (15 ft 5 in)
- Width 1.9 metres (6 ft 3 in)
- Empty weight 146 kg (322 lb)
- Max engine weight 110 kg (240 lb)
- Max passengers: 10
- Max payload (including fuel): 1,250 kg (2,760 lb)
- Max range: varies depending on fuel load and payload

== Operators ==
- Philippines - Philippine Marine Corps
- United States United States Marine Corps, United States Navy

== See also ==
- Offshore Raiding Craft
