= Offshore Raiding Craft =

Small boat used by the Royal Marines

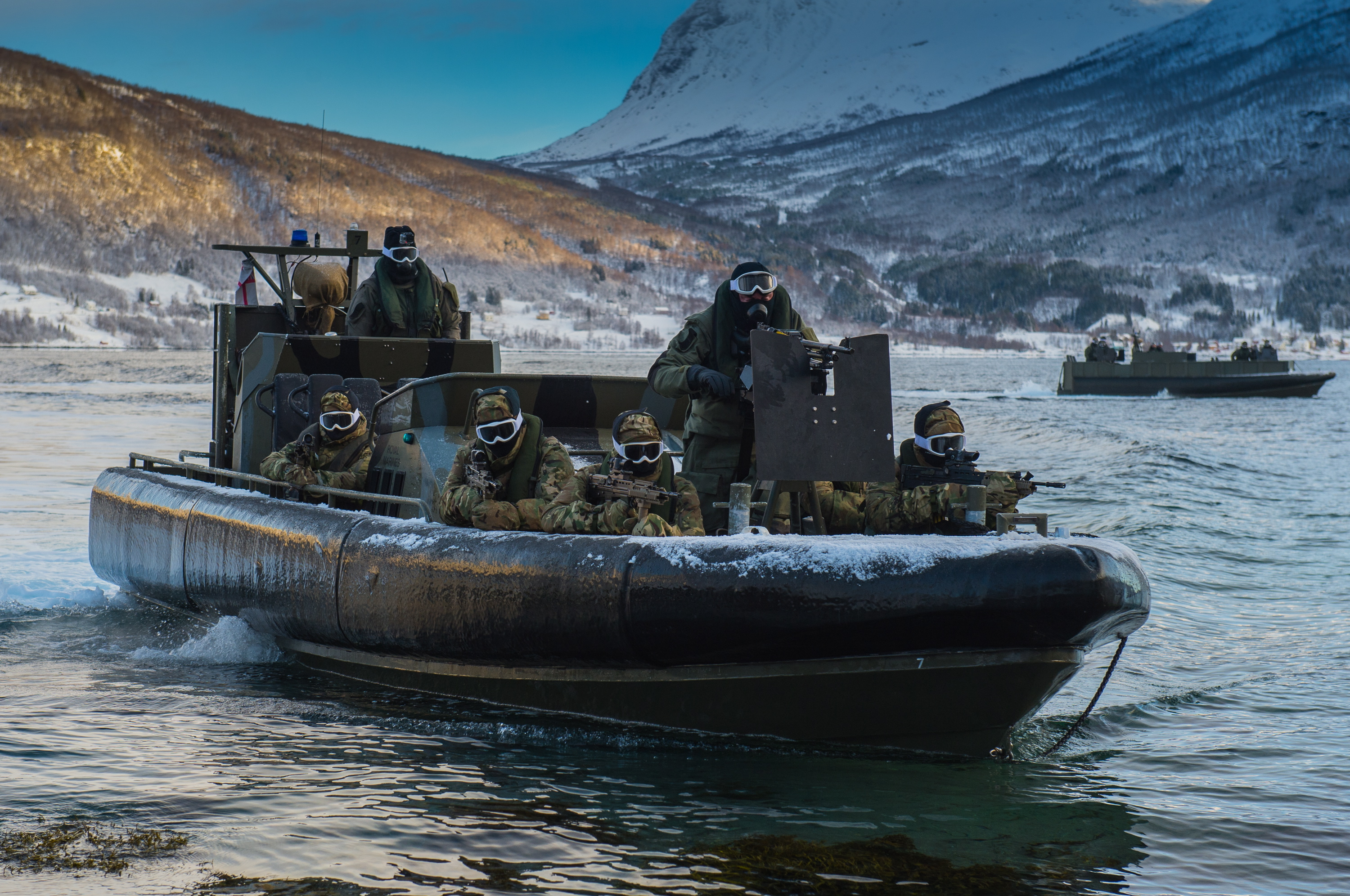
- Royal Marine Offshore Raiding Craft

Class overview
- Builders: Holyhead Marine Services
- Active: Several dozen CRC/ORC as of 2024 (troop-carrying and fire-support variants)

General characteristics
- Type: Fast Assault Craft
- Displacement: Light Load 4760 kg inc fuel & 2 crew & armour, Full load 6000 kg
- Length: 9.1m
- Beam: 2.9m
- Draught: Light 0.56 m, Loaded 0.69 m
- Propulsion: Twin Steyr M0256K43 high speed diesel engines each developing 250Hp/184Kw at 4300rpm.
- Speed: Light load 39 knots, Full load 32 knots (ORC); "up to 40 knots" (CRC)
- Range: In excess of 200 nautical miles (370 km) (ORC and CRC)
- Complement: 12 Royal Marines (1 driver, 3 gunners, 8 fully equipped troops)
- Armament: Fwd; single or twin GPMG. Aft 2 off; .50 cal, GPMG or 40mm grenade launchers, Gau mini gun
- Armour: Dynema ballistic protection to defeat 7.62mm x 39 Ball at 20m. (optional)

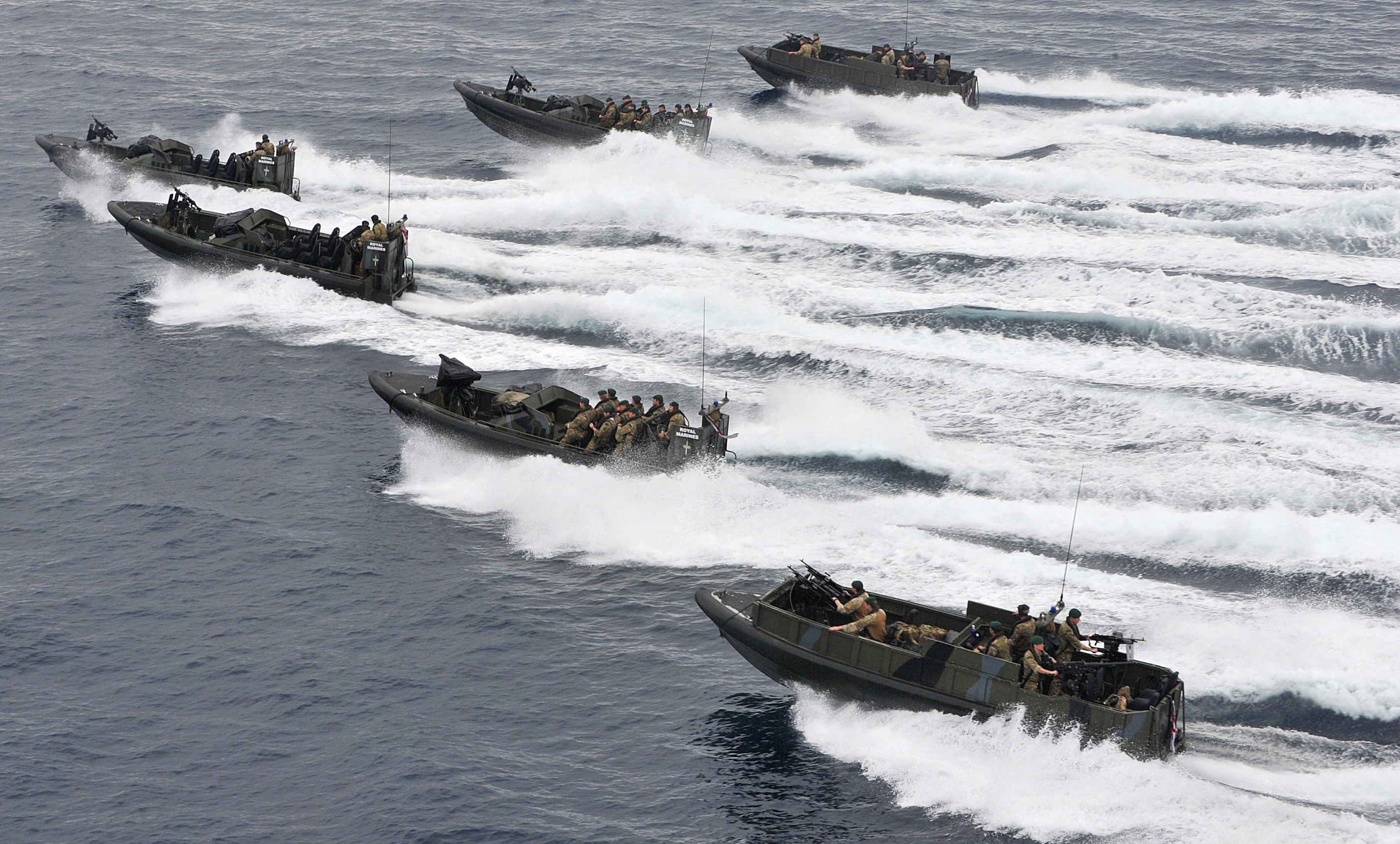
Royal Marines Offshore Raiding Craft during exercise Corsican Lion in 2012. Note the two ORCs -top and bottom right- fitted with armour.

The Offshore Raiding Craft (ORC) is a small, fast boat used by the Royal Marines for troop insertion, and patrols. The ORC is primarily used when undertaking strategic raiding missions, where speed and covertness is desired. However, it is equally capable when conducting larger scale amphibious operations alongside the larger and more traditional LCACs, LCUs and LCVPs.

There are two variants of the ORC:

- Mid Console Variant (MCV), a.k.a. the Fire Support Variant
- Aft Console Variant (ACV), a.k.a. the Troop Carrying Variant

== Commando Raiding Craft ==
In 2023, 23 of the original 35 ORC were reportedly donated to Ukraine. They were replaced in U.K. service by the upgraded Commando Raiding Craft (CRC). The CRC is fitted with three general purpose machine guns or .50 heavy machine gun mounts, as well as protection against enemy fire for the troops inside. The CRC has a speed of up to 40 knots, a range of 200 nautical miles and can be underslung from a helicopter or deployed from ships of various sizes. They incorporate a new configuration with driving position moved from the back to front for better manoeuvrability and employ a more sophisticated electronic suite for communications and navigation.

== See also ==
- List of active Royal Marines military watercraft
- Combat Rubber Raiding Craft
