= Basic Rapid Deployment Force Course (Malaysia) =

Selection and assessment programme in the Malaysian Army

The Basic Rapid Deployment Force Course (Malay: Kursus Asas Pasukan Aturgerak Cepat, abbreviated as APAC) is a four-week course conducted by the Malaysian Army. It forms part of the Malaysia Rapid Deployment Force Selection pipeline for officers and soldiers who intend to join the Malaysian Rapid Deployment Force (RDF) and the 10th Parachute Brigade.

The course is one of five phases in the RDF selection process, alongside the preparatory course, the basic parachutist course, the basic amphibious warfare course, and the basic air assault course. Depending on the availability of training slots, the APAC course may be conducted as either the second or third phase. (Note: The preparatory course lasts for 2 weeks, and the basic parachutist course, also known as jump school or airborne school, lasts for 4 weeks.) It is typically held at Camp Terendak in Malacca and traditionally concludes at Dataran Parawood (Parawood Parade Ground). However, in 2021, the course concluded at the Kuala Terengganu Drawbridge.

Following the elevation of the 10th Parachute Brigade to hybrid airborne-marine status in 2022, during the 89th Army Day (Hari Tentera Darat), the course finale has since been relocated to coastal areas, including Besar Island in Malacca.

The APAC course is regarded as the Malaysian Army's equivalent to the United States Army's Ranger Assessment and Selection Programme (RASP). At present, passing this course is the sole pathway for officers and soldiers to earn the maroon beret.

== History ==
Following the reorganisation of the 11th Reserve Army Division into the 11th Strategic Division in 1984 and its reassignment to a strategic defence role, the division was tasked with studying foreign military training models to determine the most suitable practices for adoption by the Malaysian Army. Delegations were sent to several countries, and the capabilities of the British Army's 5th Airborne Brigade attracted particular interest.

In 1987, Task Force 083 (now 10th Parachute Brigade), under the command of the 11th Strategic Division, conducted a trial of airborne capabilities using the 8th Battalion, Royal Rangers. To support this initiative, the 11th Strategic Division developed an airborne training course in collaboration with the Special Warfare Training Centre, which is responsible for preparing the Malaysian Army's Special Forces in airborne operations. The course was inspired by the British Army's Pre-Parachute Selection (P Company) and the United States Army's four-week Ranger Indoctrination Program (RIP), now known as the Ranger Assessment and Selection Programme (RASP).

The course originally lasted five weeks but was shortened to four weeks beginning with Series 1/2022. In Series 1/2025, the 10th Parachute Brigade introduced an experimental pilot version of the course, incorporating elements of basic amphibious warfare and basic air assault training. This extended the course duration to six weeks. The brigade command is currently planning to test a seven-week version in the upcoming series, with the most effective structure to be adopted as the official standard in the future.

== Course aims ==
This course is designed to assess and evaluate the mental and physical endurance of officers and soldiers aspiring to join an elite unit in the Malaysian Army. It serves the purpose of acquainting participants with the roles, challenges, and responsibilities they will encounter upon becoming members of the Malaysian Rapid Deployment Force. Furthermore, the rigorous nature of the assessments in this course aims to cultivate a sense of camaraderie, or esprit de corps, among the members of the Malaysian Rapid Deployment Force and instill a profound sense of achievement for entering the airborne brotherhood.

== Course ==
This 4-week course closely resembles the curriculum of the US Army's Ranger Assessment and Selection Program, except it excludes marksmanship, breaching and explosive tactics. (Note: RASP is an 8-week course, with the last four weeks focusing on special operations tactics, including marksmanship, explosives, and breaching.) Conducted twice a year and also referred to as Latihan Semangat Waja and Pegasus Course, the course is divided into two phases. The initial phase takes place in a camp setting, and the subsequent phase involves candidates undergoing intense physical training as an introduction to what they will face if selected to be part of any unit under the 10th Parachute Brigade. This course is the final phase in the Malaysian Rapid Deployment Force pipeline, following the jump school. Candidates at this stage are already drained and exhausted from the jump school held at the Special Warfare Training Centre.

=== Phase 1: Camp Phase ===
Phase 1, also known as the 'camp phase', is typically held at Camp Terendak. During this phase, candidates are introduced theoretically and practically to the three core operations synonymous with the 10th Parachute Brigade:

1. Airborne operations
2. Air assault operations
3. Amphibious operations

This phase is also designed to prepare candidates for what they will face in the second phase. Candidates must pass the following tests during this phase before proceeding to the second phase of the course:

- Obstacle and endurance course: A speed march for 1.5 kilometres (0.93 mi) in full battle gear before navigating 11 obstacles under 8 minutes and 30 seconds
- 150 metres (160 yd) swimming test
- 10 metres (33 ft) platform dive
- Commando endurance course: The Malaysian Army version of the Royal Marines' Tarzan assault course
- Tower test: Abseiling and repelling
- 12 kilometres (7.5 mi) speed march under 1 hour 45 minutes in full battle gear
- Team carrying a 250 kilograms (550 lb) combat raiding craft for 2.2 kilometres (1.4 mi)
- 3.2 kilometres (2.0 mi) run under 14 minutes and 30 seconds without full battle gear
- 22 kilometres (14 mi) speed march in full battle gear

=== Phase 2: Field Phase ===
After successfully completing the 22 kilometres (14 mi) speed march, candidates proceed to the next phase, the 'field phase'. This phase, held outside the military camp, is designed as a practical test for candidates, emphasising skills as an amphibious unit and long-ranged patrol unit. Candidates begin this phase by paddling combat raiding craft, simulating infiltration by sea, before navigating through land in full battle gear with loaded bags and equipment. Upon reaching Mount Ledang, they hike up and descend the mountain before surviving in a swamp for four days. Afterwards, they proceed with the final test, a 40 kilometres (25 mi) loaded forced march back to Camp Terendak. The total distance they have to cover by foot during this phase is about 65 kilometres (40 mi).

The tests they need to pass in this phase are:

- Paddling a combat raiding craft for 25 kilometres (13 nmi)
- 17 kilometres (11 mi) night and day map reading and land navigation test
- River crossing exercise
- Climb and descend Mount Ledang (Highest point: 1,276 metres (4,186 ft))
- Four-day survival training in a swamp area
- 40 kilometres (25 mi) of forced march in full battle gear

== Advanced course ==
Beginning in 2025, two additional courses have been made compulsory and incorporated into the Rapid Deployment Force selection pipeline. These are the Basic Amphibious Warfare Course and the Basic Air Assault Course. Both are conducted following the completion of the Basic Rapid Deployment Force Course.

As these courses are currently in the experimental stage, their combined duration ranges between two and three weeks. Until the training structure is finalised, the exact duration of each course remains subject to change.

== Graduation ==
Before the modifications were made to the course in 2022, the ceremony for the Malaysian Rapid Deployment Force pipeline occurred at the end of the 40 kilometres (25 mi) forced march. At the conclusion of the forced march on the 'Parawood parade grounds', candidates in full battle gear needed to swim across a 100 metres (110 yd) pool that symbolised the end of all tests. A simple graduation ceremony, attended by family and friends, included the bestowal of the maroon beret, a blood wings (Malay: Sayap berdarah) ceremony, and a war dance demonstration by the graduates.

After Series 1/2022, the graduation ceremony includes a beach assault demonstration by the graduates, symbolising the 10th Parachute Brigade's dual role as both a marine and its original role as an airborne and air assault unit. Only after the beach assault demonstration will graduates be bestowed with the maroon beret and a blood wings ceremony.

=== Blood wings ceremony ===
Instructors hold the Parachutist Badge, also known as the airborne wing, which graduates should receive upon completing jump school before starting the Basic Rapid Deployment Force Course. They only receive it during this ceremony. The blood wings ceremony is a tradition in which VIP guests punch the airborne wing into the graduate's chest. The wings, without a pin-back clasp, pierce the graduate's skin, causing them to bleed with their airborne wing. This tradition has been carried on since the early '80s, inspired by the Gerak Khas airborne graduates who received a similar ceremony after completing jump school at the Special Warfare Training Centre. This practice is itself inspired by the US Army's and US Marine Corps' tradition of blood wings. (Note: see Blood wings)

Those who go through this ceremony have the right to wear a blood-red background trim (Malay: Pelapik) at the back of their parachutist badge when using any service uniform, excluding the combat uniform.
