= Special Warfare Training Centre (Malaysia) =

Military school for special operations

- Pusat Latihan Peperangan Khusus ڤوست لاتيهن ڤڤراڠن خصوص
- PULPAK Emblem
- Founded: 1 August 1976; 50 years ago
- Country: Malaysia
- Branch: Malaysian Army
- Type: Special Operations Training Centre
- Role: To recruit, assess, select, train, and educate members of the Malaysian Army's 21 GGK and the Malaysian Armed Forces. This is achieved by offering basic and advanced special operations training, education, and doctrine.
- Part of: Malaysian Army Training and Doctrine Command
- Garrison/HQ: Camp Sungai Udang, Malacca
- Nicknames: "Kilang Gerak Khas" ('Gerak Khas Factory')
- Mottos: Pengetahuan Kejayaan ('Knowledge Success')

Commanders
- Commandant: Colonel Nordin bin Abu

Insignia
- Beret Flash

The Special Warfare Training Centre (Abbr.: SWTC; Malay: Pusat Latihan Peperangan Khusus — PULPAK; Jawi: ڤوست لاتيهن ڤڤراڠن خصوص) is a Malaysian Army training centre located at the Camp Sungai Udang in Malacca. Its primary purpose is to conduct special forces selection and to provide specialised courses and training for personnel from the 21st Special Service Group, 10th Parachute Brigade, and other elite units of the Malaysian Armed Forces (MAF) (Angkatan Tentera Malaysia — ATM) to strengthen Malaysia's defensive garrison against enemies and terrorists.

The SWTC also provides training to personnel from the Royal Malaysian Police, the Malaysian Coast Guard, the Johor Military Force, and the special forces of neighbouring nations, such as Brunei, Myanmar, and the Maldives.

The SWTC is managed by the 21st Special Service Group and administered by the Army Training and Doctrine Command (Markas Pemerintahan Latihan dan Doktrin Tentera Darat). The technical control of SWTC is overseen by the Special Forces Operation Cell (Sel Operasi Pasukan Khusus — SOPASUS) of the Operations and Training Wing (Cawangan Operasi dan Latihan — OPLAT) of the Malaysian Army Command (Markas Tentera Darat).

== History ==
=== Establishment as Special Warfare Training Centre of Malaysian Armed Forces ===
Regional political and military changes in Southeast Asia led to the idea of establishing a special training facility to provide personnel with specialised knowledge, particularly for Gerak Khas members. On 1 August 1976, the training centre was established at Camp Sungai Udang in Malacca as Pusat Latihan Peperangan Khas Angkatan Tentera Malaysia (PLPK ATM). By 1 January 1977, the centre had become fully operational and had begun conducting special forces selection.

In 1979, the training centre expanded its role to become a comprehensive military school, teaching a variety of special operations skills. Before 1979, MAF's special operations personnel received specialised training at overseas military academies. The rising costs of sending personnel overseas contributed to the development of SWTC. Prior to the foundation of SWTC, members of the 1st Malaysian Special Service Regiment (now known as the 21st Commando Regiment) conducted fundamental courses such as the Basic Commando Course (Kursus Asas Komando).

=== Name Change to Special Warfare Training Centre of Malaysian Army ===
In 1985, PLPK ATM was renamed Pusat Latihan Peperangan Khas Tentera Darat (PLPK TD) after the Royal Malaysian Navy (RMN) and Royal Malaysian Air Force (RMAF) began conducting their own special forces selection at their respective bases.

=== Transfer to the Command of the Malaysian Army Training and Doctrine Command ===
In 1995, PLPK TD changed its name once more when all training institutes under the Malaysian Army were renamed in accordance with the creation of the Army Training and Doctrine Command (Pemerintahan Latihan dan Doktrin Tentera Darat). It is currently called the Special Warfare Training Centre or Pusat Latihan Peperangan Khusus in Malay and is popularly known by the abbreviation of its Malay name, PULPAK. (Note: PUsat Latihan PeperangAn Khusus) The centre is no longer under the administration of the 21st Special Service Group but is now administered by the Army Training and Doctrine Command.

== Roles ==
The SWTC's objectives are to provide specialised training and courses to all military personnel according to the current situation. SWTC's tasks include:

- Conducting basic commando training for the Malaysian Army and other military services.
- Training personnel of special forces as well as regular soldiers in specialised training and special operations as required by higher authority.
- Conducting advanced training for special forces and army personnel as directed by higher authority.
- Conducting training evaluation tests on special forces.
- Providing observers and qualified instructors for specialised assignments in special forces.
- Revising and analysing all doctrines pertaining to specialised training and operations.

== Training Module ==
At SWTC, most instructors come from the 21st Special Service Group and the 10th Parachute Brigade. They ensure their knowledge and skills are up-to-date by attending military schools in other countries.

SWTC comprises five training wings, each offering specialised courses.

=== Commando Wing ===
- Basic Commando Course (Note: Before 1985, the SWTC conducted the Basic Commando Course for all three branches of the Malaysian Armed Forces: Gerak Khas, PASKAL, and HANDAU.)
- Sniper Course (Note: The Malaysian Army offers two sniper courses. The SWTC conducts a sniper course tailored for special forces, while the Army Combat Training Centre (PULADA) provides the infantry sniper course.)
- Sniper Supervisor Course
- Mountaineering Course
- Mountaineering Supervisor Course

=== Special Stratagem Wing ===
- Small Unit Patrol Course
- Patrol Leader Course
- Patrol Sergeant Course
- Patrol Officer Course
- Close Quarter Battle (CQB) Course
- Abseiling Supervisor Course

=== Parachute Wing ===
- Basic Parachute Course (Malay: Kursus Asas Payung Terjun)
- Jump master Course
- Basic Free Fall Course
- Advanced Free Fall Course (HAHO/HALO)
- Static Ramp Air Course
- Parachute Instructor Course (Static Line)
- Parachute Instructor Course (Free Fall)
- Pathfinder Course

=== Rigger Wing ===
- Basic Parachute Rigger and Maintenance Course
- Inspector of Rigging and Maintenance

=== Amphibious Wing ===
- Small Boat Coxswains Course
- Basic Diving Course
- Diving Instructor Course
- Combat Swimmer Course
- Combat Swimmer Assistant Leader Course
- Combat Swimmer Leader Course
- Basic Demolition Course (Malay: Kursus Asas Letupan)
- Special Demolition Course (Malay: Kursus Letupan Khas)

== Former Commandant ==
Name	Year
Colonel Hussin bin Awang Senik,	1 January 1977 – 1 March 1978
Colonel Borhan bin Ahmad	1 March 1978 – 1 January 1981
Colonel Hasbullah bin Yusof	1 January 1981 – 16 November 1983
Colonel Mohd Ramli bin Ismail	16 November 1983 – 16 January 1987
Colonel Ghazali bin Ibrahim	16 January 1987 – 16 January 1990
Colonel Zainuddin bin Taib	16 January 1990 – 1 August 1991
Colonel Ahmad Rodi bin Zakaria	1 August 1991 – 1 May 1995
Colonel Mohd Shahrin bin Hj. Abd Majid	1 May 1995 – 16 May 1997
Colonel Muhamad Yasin bin Yahya	16 May 1997
