= Rapid Deployment Force (Malaysia) =

Malaysian Rapid Deployment Force
- Pasukan Aturgerak Cepat Malaysia ڤاسوكن اتورڬرق چڤت
- Founded: 10 October 1994; 30 years ago
- Country: Malaysia
- Branch: Malaysian Army; Fire and Rescue Department of Malaysia
- Role: Military: Airborne forces, Quick reaction force; Non-military: First responder, Search and rescue

The Malaysian Rapid Deployment Force (Abbr.: RDF; Malay: Pasukan Aturgerak Cepat — PAC) is a rapid reaction force that to can be quickly deployed during an emergency (wartime or peacetime) usually via air or light land transport. Malaysia RDF has military and non-military components.

== History ==
On 10 October 1994, three Malaysian Army airborne battalions, the 8th Royal Ranger Regiment (Para), 9th Royal Malay Regiment (Para) and 17th Royal Malay Regiment (Para) were reorganised and redesignated into a single airborne force termed the 10th Parachute Brigade, also known as 10 Para.

In March 2011, the Fire and Rescue Department of Malaysia (FRDM) established the Special Tactical Operation and Rescue Team of Malaysia, or popularly known as STORM. The new team originally functioned as a Special Rescue Unit for incidents involving urban areas, landslides, high-building rescue, wide-area search and rescue (SAR), forest fires, flood and natural disasters. In March 2014, after flight MH370 went missing, the scope and capabilities of the STORM widened to include SAR for aircraft crashes. The team was retrained to be part of the Rapid Deployment Force.

== Components ==
The Malaysian Rapid Deployment Force has two components. The military component was added in 1994, while the non-military component was added in 2014. The military component includes parachute capability, while the non-military components are spread across the nation and act as first responders.

=== Rapid Deployment Force ===
The RDF is officially named the Rapid Deployment Forces of Malaysian Armed Forces (RDF-MAF; Malay: Pasukan Aturgerak Cepat Angkatan Tentera Malaysia — PAC-ATM). This component is a key component for the Malaysian RDF. Currently, there is only the 10th Parachute Brigade inside this component. This component is supported by the Royal Malaysian Air Force (RMAF) for air transportation. Few platoons are based at the RMAF Airbase for Quick reaction force roles. The members of the RDF-MAF can be identified with its maroon 'PAC' shoulder tab on their left shoulder. PAC is the acronym for the Pasukan Aturgerak Cepat. Its members are trained as parachute forces.

=== Special Tactical Operation and Rescue Team ===
The Special Tactical Operation and Rescue Team of Malaysia (STORM; Malay: Pasukan Khas Operasi, Taktikal dan Penyelamat Malaysia) is the FRDM's urban search and rescue (USAR) team. It was established in 2011 to operate with the Federal Government Heavy USAR Taskforce. The SMART team initially responded to emergencies in the cities at West Malaysia. STORM's role later expanded to include aircraft crash SAR and its region of operations were widened to include East Malaysia. The STORM is the most elite unit in the FRDM. Its members are spread throughout FRDM State's Headquarters. Its members can be identified with the 'STORM' unit patch and the 'STORM' Camouflage Dress.
