= Malaysian Armed Forces Reserve =

Combined military reserve components of the Malaysian Armed Forces

- Pasukan Simpanan Angkatan Tentera (ڤاسوكن سيمڤنن اڠكتن تنترا); Angkatan Sukarela (اڠكتن سوكاريلا)
- Founded: 2010 (15 years ago)
- Country: Malaysia
- Branch: Malaysian Army; Royal Malaysian Navy; Royal Malaysian Air Force
- Type: Military reserve force
- Part of: Malaysian Armed Forces
- Headquarters: Wisma Kementah, Camp Mindef, Kuala Lumpur
- Nickname(s): PSAT

Commanders
- Current commander: Chief of Defence Forces

The Malaysian Armed Forces Reserve (Malay: Pasukan Simpanan Angkatan Tentera — PSAT, Jawi: ڤاسوكن سيمڤنن اڠكتن تنترا), also known in Malay as Angkatan Sukarela (Reserve Force), serves as the combined military reserve component of the Malaysian Armed Forces (MAF). It comprises non-regular personnel who are trained the same as regular armed forces for both peacetime and wartime operations.

The reserve force was officially established in 2010 following a revision of the National Defence Policy (Dasar Pertahanan Negara). The primary aim of this restructuring was to centralise and unify the previously independent reserve elements maintained by the three branches of the armed forces:

- The Territorial Army
- The Royal Malaysian Naval Volunteer Reserve
- The Royal Malaysian Air Force Volunteer Reserve

The overall command of the Malaysian Armed Forces Reserve falls under the position of Commander of the Reserve Force (Panglima Pasukan Simpanan), a role concurrently held by the Chief of Defence Forces. The Commander is supported by senior flag officers from each branch of service, known as Assistant Commanders of the Reserve Force (Asisten Panglima Pasukan Simpanan), who represent and coordinate reserve matters within their respective services.

== History ==
=== Origins: Straits Settlements Volunteer Force and Force 136 ===
The earliest locally raised reserve unit in British Malaya was the Singapore Volunteer Rifle Corps, formed in 1854 in the Straits Settlements state of Singapore. (Note: At the time, Singapore was one of the states within the broader region known as Malaya, or British Malaya.) This unit was established in response to patriotic sentiment among the European community in Malaya during the Crimean War. The volunteer movement later spread to other regions of the Straits Settlements, including Penang, Province Wellesley and Malacca, where the Penang and Province Wellesley Volunteer Corps was established on 1 March 1861, followed by the formation of the Malacca Volunteer Corps in 1922.

Initially, these units functioned as militia forces and were not centrally organised or included in the official order of battle of the Malayan Security Forces. They were only brought under centralised control in 1924, after the creation of Malayan Command, when they were consolidated under the Straits Settlements Volunteer Force (SSVF) and formally recognised within the British military structure. Similar volunteer formations were later raised in the Federated Malay States and Unfederated Malay States. All such reservist units were disbanded following the occupation of British Malaya by the Imperial Japanese Army during the Second World War.

During the Japanese occupation, the Far East branch of the British Special Operations Executive (SOE) deployed operatives from Force 136 into Malaya by submarine and parachute. In addition to conducting sabotage operations, these operatives recruited local volunteers to form guerrilla resistance units. Among the resistance cells formed during this period were the Force 136 Ulu Perak Branch (also known locally as Askar Melayu Setia), the Force 136 Kedah Branch, and the Force 136 Pahang Branch (also known as Wataniah Pahang). These units were disbanded following the end of the war and the surrender of Japanese forces in 1945.

=== The Malayan Emergency and the Home Guard ===
In 1948, the Malayan Emergency began, marking the start of an armed insurgency by the Malayan Communist Party (MCP), which sought to establish a Communist state in Malaya. The MCP had previously been allied with the British during the Second World War through its military wing, the Malayan Peoples' Anti-Japanese Army (MPAJA). Following the war, the MPAJA reorganised itself as the Malayan Peoples' Anti-British Army, later renamed the Malayan National Liberation Army (MNLA).

The MNLA operated primarily as a guerrilla force and relied on raiding villages to obtain food and supplies. In response, the colonial government established a village-based militia known as the Home Guard, composed of civilian volunteers from local communities. These included both men and women of various ages, who were trained by the police and military to defend their villages from insurgent attacks.

=== Establishment of the Territorial Army of Malaya ===
As the Malayan Emergency approached its final phase and the Communist insurgency weakened, the government decided that the Home Guard was no longer necessary in its existing form. However, many volunteers expressed their desire to continue serving the nation. This sentiment was conveyed to policymakers, who took steps to retain a structured reserve force.

In early 1958, the government passed the Territorial Army Ordinance 1958, which came into effect on 1 June 1958. On the same date, the Territorial Army of Malaya was officially established. Known in Malay as Askar Wataniah (عسكر وطنيه), the name was selected to honour the wartime resistance group Wataniah Pahang. The unit would later become known as the Rejimen Askar Wataniah, or Territorial Army Regiment in English.

Many of the initial members were drawn from the Home Guard. However, because the Territorial Army was still in its early stages of development and could not yet provide nationwide coverage, the Home Guard continued to operate in certain areas. Over time, its role shifted from a military support force to an auxiliary policing function.

The legacy of the Home Guard continues today in the form of the Malaysia Volunteers Corps Department (RELA), short for Ikatan Sukarelawan Malaysia. RELA now operates under the Ministry of Home Affairs, providing auxiliary support to both the Royal Malaysia Police and the Malaysian Armed Forces.

=== Establishment of the Royal Malaysian Naval Volunteer Reserve ===
The Royal Malaysian Naval Volunteer Reserve (Pasukan Simpanan Sukarela Tentera Laut Diraja Malaysia, abbreviated as PSSTLDM) was officially established in 1952 under the name Malaya Naval Reserve. The formation was modelled after the Straits Settlements Naval Volunteer Reserve (SSNVR), which served as the Royal Navy's naval reserve component within the Straits Settlements Volunteer Force.

The original SSNVR was first raised on 27 April 1934 at Sembawang Naval Base in Singapore. A second branch was later established in Georgetown, Penang, in 1938. As with other reservist formations in British Malaya, the SSNVR was disbanded during the Japanese occupation in the Second World War. Following the end of the conflict and the reorganisation of Malaya's defence forces, the Malaya Naval Reserve was created on the same grounds as the former SSNVR base in Penang.

In 1963, coinciding with the formation of Malaysia, the unit was officially renamed the Royal Malaysian Naval Volunteer Reserve, reflecting its integration into the Royal Malaysian Navy as its volunteer reserve component.

=== Establishment of the Royal Malaysian Air Force Volunteer Reserve ===
The Royal Malaysian Air Force Volunteer Reserve (Pasukan Simpanan Sukarela Tentera Udara Diraja Malaysia, abbreviated as PSSTUDM) was formally established in 1988. Its origins can be traced to No. 101 Flight RMAF, a security flight under the Royal Malaysian Air Force (RMAF), which was originally formed on 24 April 1959.

In 1988, No. 101 Flight was relocated to Universiti Utara Malaysia to serve as a training unit for the university's Air Force Reserve Officer Training Unit (ROTU). This move marked the beginning of a formalised air force reserve training structure within higher education institutions.

On 6 October 1993, following a decision by the Board of Ministers, the RMAF Command upgraded No. 101 Flight to a full command-level formation under the name Pasukan Simpanan Tentera Udara (Air Force Reserve Command). This reorganisation placed all air force reserve elements under a single unified command structure, and the new command assumed responsibility for recruitment, training, and mobilisation of all RMAF reservist personnel.

=== Creation of the Malaysian Armed Forces Reserve ===
Malaysia's National Defence Policy (Dasar Pertahanan Negara) was first introduced in 1971, initially circulated only within the armed forces. It has been revised on several occasions, including in 1979, 1981, 1986, 1993, 2006, and most recently in 2010. A major conceptual shift occurred in 1989, when the then Minister of Defence, Tan Sri Musa Hitam, introduced the concept of Total Defence, known in Malay as Pertahanan Menyeluruh or HANRUH.

Prior to the adoption of HANRUH, military reservists were often regarded as a secondary component of national defence, with a limited role as a second line of response. Under the HANRUH concept, reservists were recognised as an integral part of a broader, whole-of-nation defence strategy. The 2010 revision of the National Defence Policy formally stipulated that regular and reservist personnel were to be treated as equals in the defence of the country.

This policy revision led to a significant professionalisation of the reserve forces. Reservists began receiving training equivalent to that of regular personnel and were no longer viewed as auxiliary or subordinate troops. The same revision also resulted in the establishment of the Malaysian Armed Forces Reserve, a unified structure intended to consolidate all existing reserve formations across the Army, Navy, and Air Force under a standardised command and training system.

Since the implementation of these reforms, the integration of reserve units into the regular command structure has advanced significantly. Within the Malaysian Army, reservist regiments and units are now placed under the operational control of regular army divisions and brigades, enabling them to deploy alongside regular forces in any missions.

== Armed Forces Act 1972 ==
Reservists serving under the Malaysian Armed Forces Reserve are subject to the Armed Forces Act 1972 (Act 77), in the same manner as regular personnel of the Malaysian Armed Forces. This legislation places reservists under the jurisdiction of military law, meaning that any offences committed during the course of their reservist duties are handled in accordance with the provisions of Malaysian military justice.

At the same time, reservists are afforded specific legal protections under Sections 201B and 201C of the Armed Forces Act 1972. These provisions safeguard reservists from employment-related repercussions while they are fulfilling military duties on behalf of the nation. In essence, these sections are designed to ensure that civilian employers cannot penalise, dismiss, or discriminate against employees who are temporarily absent from work due to their commitment to military service.

== Organisation and structure ==
Under the 2010 revision of the National Defence Policy, the Malaysian Armed Forces Reserve was formally classified into two categories: the Regular Force Reserve (Pasukan Simpanan Angkatan Tetap) and the Volunteer Force Reserve (Pasukan Simpanan Angkatan Sukarela). In practice, this categorisation is largely administrative, as both groups operate within a unified structure. Operationally, all reservists serve under one of three principal components that form the core of the Malaysian Armed Forces Reserve.

The three main components are:

- Territorial Army (Pasukan Askar Wataniah)
- Royal Malaysian Naval Volunteer Reserve (Pasukan Simpanan Sukarela Tentera Laut Diraja Malaysia)
- Royal Malaysian Air Force Volunteer Reserve (Pasukan Simpanan Sukarela Tentera Udara Diraja Malaysia)

In addition to these main components, several supporting units are also included under the umbrella of the Armed Forces Reserve. These include:

- Full-Time Mobilised Force (Pasukan Kerahan Sepenuh Masa)
- Specialist and Specialised Reserve Force (Pasukan Simpanan Pakar dan Khusus)
- Reserve Officer Training Unit (Pasukan Latihan Pegawai Simpanan)
- Reservist Training Unit (Pasukan Latihan Anggota Simpanan)
- Malaysian Combined Cadet Force (Pasukan Kadet Bersatu Malaysia)

=== Regular Force Reserve ===
The Regular Force Reserve (Malay: Pasukan Simpanan Angkatan Tetap) consists of former regular service personnel who have completed their mandatory service, either through retirement or resignation. Members retain their previous rank and professional specialisations and may be called upon to serve in a similar capacity within the reserve.

=== Volunteer Force Reserve ===
The Volunteer Force Reserve (Malay: Pasukan Simpanan Angkatan Sukarela) comprises individuals who join the military through specific reservist recruitment schemes. These include entry via the Reserve Officer Training Unit (ROTU), the Reservist Training Unit, or other conventional recruitment pathways. Unless commissioned as officers or enlisted as specialists, these personnel begin their service at the lowest enlisted ranks, in the same manner as regular recruits.

=== Full-Time Mobilised Force ===
The Full-Time Mobilised Force (Malay: Pasukan Kerahan Sepenuh Masa) is composed of contract-based personnel who serve full-time in roles comparable to those of regular military staff. They follow the same pay structure as regular personnel. However, they serve on fixed-term contracts, are not eligible for a full career progression to senior officer ranks, and do not qualify for military retirement benefits. Despite these limitations, members of this force have greater prospects for absorption into the regular services.

=== Specialist and Specialised Reserve Force ===
The Specialist and Specialised Reserve Force (Malay: Pasukan Simpanan Pakar dan Khusus) recruits individuals with professional expertise in niche technical and engineering fields. These include telecommunications, port operations, water resources engineering, power generation, and railway systems. The 2020 Defence White Paper outlined the government's intent to expand recruitment into additional fields aligned with evolving national defence needs.

=== Reserve Officer Training Unit (ROTU) ===
The Reserve Officer Training Unit (Malay: Pasukan Latihan Pegawai Simpanan) is a structured officer commissioning programme for undergraduates at selected Malaysian universities. Cadets undergo three years of military training during their academic studies. Upon successful completion, graduates are commissioned as reserve officers in one of the three main reserve components of the Malaysian Armed Forces.

=== Reservist Training Unit ===
The Reservist Training Unit (Malay: Pasukan Latihan Anggota Simpanan) is a military training programme designed for students pursuing diploma or certificate-level qualifications at public universities and Technical and Vocational Education and Training (TVET) institutions. It is distinct from the Reserve Officer Training Unit (ROTU), which is intended for undergraduate students on officer commissioning pathways.

Participants in the Reservist Training Unit receive non-officer-level military instruction and are subsequently enlisted into the Malaysian Armed Forces Reserve as other ranks. Upon completion of training, they are posted to one of the three main reserve components.

The programme serves as a pathway for non-degree students to contribute to national defence while gaining military skills and discipline alongside their vocational education.

=== Malaysian Combined Cadet Force ===
The Malaysian Combined Cadet Force (Malay: Pasukan Kadet Bersatu Malaysia, abbreviated as PKBM) is a uniformed youth organisation established in selected secondary schools throughout Malaysia. The programme is modelled after the British Combined Cadet Force and serves as an introductory platform for students to experience military structure, values, and discipline.

Each branch of the Malaysian Armed Forces administers its own component of the cadet corps, which includes:

- PKBM Darat (Combined Cadet Force Army Section)
- PKBM Laut (Combined Cadet Force Navy Section)
- PKBM Udara (Combined Cadet Force Air Force Section)

Participation is limited to schools in proximity to military installations. Unlike the British version, The Cadets in Malaysia are issued a military identification number similar to those of regular personnel, and the programme serves as a foundational exposure to military discipline and values.

== Future plans ==
According to the 2020 Defence White Paper, which builds upon the foundation of the National Defence Policy, the Malaysian government has outlined plans to enhance the role and capabilities of the Malaysian Armed Forces Reserve. These efforts aim to ensure that reservists are able to complement regular forces and be deployed alongside them in various operational scenarios, including crises and armed conflict.

The government has reaffirmed its commitment to integrating the reserve force more fully into national defence planning. Reservists are no longer viewed solely as a strategic reserve to be activated only during emergencies or foreign invasions. Instead, they are being positioned as a flexible and ready component of the armed forces, capable of contributing to a broad range of missions.

To realise this objective, the following initiatives have been proposed:

- Enhancing training and professionalism among reservists, ensuring they attain skills and standards equivalent to those of professional soldiers in the regular force.
- Assigning critical operational roles to reservists, such as base security, urban defence, and short-range air defence operations.
- Establishing a dedicated reserve special forces unit capable of providing rapid response capabilities in areas such as reconnaissance, border access control, and counter-insurgency operations. This concept draws inspiration from the United Kingdom's 21 SAS and 23 SAS, which are reserve special forces formations.
- Expanding the scope of the Specialist and Specialised Reserve Force, with a focus on critical technical domains such as satellite engineering, cybersecurity, systems integration, cloud computing, and big data. These additions are intended to equip the armed forces with the expertise required to confront evolving security threats in the digital and information environments.

These proposals reflect a broader strategic shift towards a total defence posture in which every component of the military, including reservists, plays a direct and proactive role in safeguarding national security.

== See also ==
- Military reserve force
  - National Guard – The combined reserve components of the United States Army and United States Air Force
  - Reserve Defence Forces – The combined military reserve components of the Irish Defence Forces
  - Primary Reserve – The combined military reserve components of the Canadian Armed Forces
- Malaysia Coast Guard Volunteer Force
- Royal Malaysia Police Volunteer Reserve
- Auxiliary Fire Brigade (Malaysia)
- Volunteer Fire Brigade (Malaysia)
