= Territorial Army (Malaysia) =

Reserve component of the Malaysian Army

Territorial Army of Malaysia
- Askar Wataniah Malaysia عسكر وطنيه مليسيا
- Crest of the Territorial Army of Malaysia
- Founded: 1 June 1958; 68 years ago
- Country: Malaysia
- Branch: Malaysian Army
- Type: Military reserve force
- Size: 50,000 total personnel
- Part of: Malaysian Armed Forces Reserve
- Headquarters: Wisma Kementah, Camp Mindef, Kuala Lumpur
- Nicknames: Rejimen Askar Wataniah (Territorial Army Regiment), AW, Angkatan Simpanan Tentera Darat Malaysia (Malaysian Army Reserve)
- Mottos: Berkhidmat Untuk Negara (Serve for the Country)
- Anniversaries: 1 June
- Deployments: Cross border attacks in Sabah (1962–present); Indonesia–Malaysia confrontation (1963–1966); Communist insurgency in Malaysia (1968–1989); 13 May 1969 racial riots; Operation Penawar (2020–2021)
- Website: https://aw.army.mil.my/imwatan/

Commanders
- Assistant Commander of the Reserve Force: Major General Dato' Mohammad Razeif Che Ahmad
- Notable commanders: Dato' Yeop Mahidin

Insignia
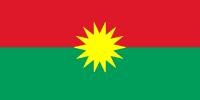
- Flag

The Territorial Army Regiment of Malaysia (Malay: Rejimen Askar Wataniah Malaysia, Jawi: عسكر وطنيه مليسيا) serves as the reserve component of the Malaysian Army. Commonly referred to as the Territorial Army Regiment (Rejimen Askar Wataniah), it is the largest military reserve force in Malaysia. The formation comprises a variety of units, including infantry regiments, armoured squadrons, engineering squadrons, and other support elements.

The Territorial Army forms one of the three principal components of the Malaysian Armed Forces Reserve, alongside the Royal Malaysian Naval Volunteer Reserve and the Royal Malaysian Air Force Volunteer Reserve.

As of the current command structure, the Territorial Army is led by Major General Dato' Mohammad Razeif Che Ahmad, who holds the appointment of Assistant Commander of the Reserve Force (Malay: Asisten Panglima Pasukan Simpanan), reporting directly to the Chief of Defence Forces, who concurrently serves as the Commander of the Reserve Force (Panglima Pasukan Simpanan).

== Etymology ==
The official Malay name of the formation is Askar Wataniah Malaysia, while its official English designation is the Territorial Army of Malaysia. The lineage of this name dates back to 1958, following the enactment of the Territorial Army Ordinance 1958, under which the force was formally established as the Askar Wataniah Malaya (Territorial Army of Malaya). The name was inspired by resistance groups that had operated during the Second World War, notably the Askar Melayu Setia and the Wataniah Pahang.

According to Dewan Bahasa dan Pustaka, both "askar" and "wataniah" are loanwords of Arabic origin. The word "Askar" (عسكر) translates to "military" or "soldier", while "Watan" (وطن) means "homeland". The suffix -iah is an Arabic-derived noun-forming element used in Malay to indicate abstract concepts or affiliations. Thus, Wataniah can be interpreted as "related to the homeland". In modern Arabic usage, as cited in A Dictionary of Modern Written Arabic (1976) by Hans Wehr, "Wataniah" denotes "patriotism" or "love for the homeland".

In colloquial Malaysian usage, the formation is often referred to as the Territorial Army Regiment (Rejimen Askar Wataniah), although this is somewhat misleading. The term is more appropriately applied to the 500-series Reserve Regiments, which form the core infantry component of the Territorial Army. In reality, the Territorial Army consists of a broad array of units, including infantry regiments, armoured squadrons, engineer squadrons, and other combat and support elements.

== History ==
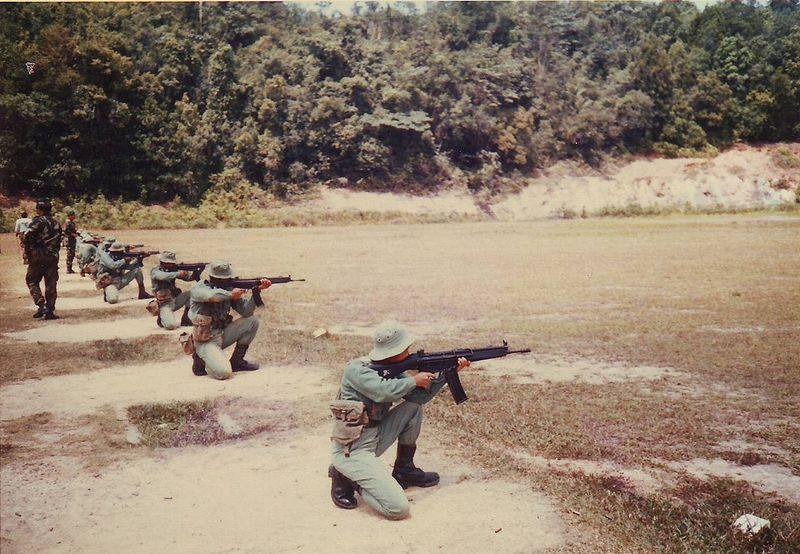
Reservist of the Territorial Army in a shooting course with Heckler & Koch HK33A2, c. 1990s.

=== Origins: Volunteer militia units in British Malaya ===
The modern history of military reserve forces in Malaya began in 1854 with the establishment of the Singapore Volunteer Rifle Corps in the Straits Settlements territory of Singapore. The outbreak of the Crimean War in 1853 stirred patriotic sentiment among the European expatriate community in Malaya, prompting the formation of local militia units. This sentiment soon spread to other territories within the Straits Settlements, leading to the creation of similar units in Penang, Province Wellesley, Malacca, and Labuan. Among these were the Penang and Province Wellesley Volunteer Corps, established on 1 March 1861, and the Malacca Volunteer Corps, formed in 1922. Similar movements later took root in the Federated Malay States and the Unfederated Malay States, where militia units began to be formed from 1902 onwards.

By 1924, the militia units of the Straits Settlements were brought under centralised control as part of the Straits Settlements Volunteer Force (SSVF). The SSVF was incorporated into the British military structure and placed under the command of the Malayan Command. Similarly, the militia units in the Federated and Unfederated Malay States were organised under the Federated Malay States Volunteer Force (FMSVF) and the Unfederated Malay States Volunteer Force (UMSVF), respectively. These formations fought alongside regular Commonwealth forces against the Imperial Japanese Army during the Second World War but were subsequently disbanded following the Japanese occupation of Malaya.

=== Local guerrilla resistance forces ===
During the Japanese occupation of Malaya, anti-Japanese resistance began to take shape. Motivated in part by the nationalist sentiment that had grown since the Second Sino-Japanese War, members of the Malayan Communist Party (MCP), largely comprising Chinese immigrants, formed the Malayan People's Anti-Japanese Army (MPAJA). Operating as a guerrilla force, the MPAJA conducted sabotage operations and harassed Japanese forces across the country.

This resistance movement opened the door for the Special Operations Executive (SOE) to insert operatives into Malaya to provide training and logistical support. The SOE's Far East branch, known as Force 136, deployed its agents covertly via submarine and parachute. Among these agents were ethnic Malays who had been recruited while studying or working abroad before the war. Notable figures included Ibrahim Ismail and Tunku Osman, both of whom were instrumental in organising Malay resistance groups.

Several Malay guerrilla formations were established under Force 136, including the Ulu Perak Branch (also known as Askar Melayu Setia), the Kedah Branch, and the Pahang Branch (also known as Wataniah Pahang). Prominent resistance fighters included Dato' Yeop Mahidin Mohamed Shariff, Tunku Abdul Rahman, Tun Abdul Razak Hussein, and Tan Sri Ghazali Shafie. These formations, together with Force 136, undertook sabotage missions against Japanese military assets. All of these guerrilla forces were disbanded following the Japanese surrender in 1945.

=== The Malayan Emergency and civilian volunteer forces ===
After the Japanese surrender on 2 September 1945, members of the MCP sought to transform Malaya into a communist state. Taking advantage of the power vacuum that existed prior to the re-establishment of British military administration on 12 September 1945, the MCP's paramilitary wing, the MPAJA, seized control of various areas, conducting reprisals against alleged collaborators. This campaign of violence continued even after the British returned.

The MPAJA was reorganised as the Malayan People's Anti-British Army and later rebranded as the Malayan Races Liberation Army (MRLA). The security situation deteriorated significantly by 1948. In response to the assassination of three European plantation managers in Sungai Siput, Perak, the Malayan Emergency was formally declared.

With MRLA insurgents acquiring supplies from both Thailand and communist sympathisers, they also resorted to raiding rural settlements. This situation necessitated the formation of the Home Guard, a locally recruited force composed of civilian volunteers. Trained by the Federation of Malaya Police Force (FMPF) and Commonwealth military personnel, these villagers were tasked with protecting their communities against insurgent attacks.

=== Establishment of the Territorial Army of Malaya ===
As the Malayan Emergency entered its final phase, the Home Guard was deemed surplus to requirements in its original form. However, many volunteers wished to continue serving the nation. In response, the Territorial Army Ordinance 1958 was passed and came into effect on 1 June 1958, officially establishing the Territorial Army of Malaya, known in Malay as Askar Wataniah Malaya and later Askar Wataniah Malaysia when Malaysia was formed in 1963, when it merged with corresponding organizations in Sarawak and British North Borneo. The name was chosen as a tribute to the wartime Askar Melayu Setia and Wataniah Pahang guerrilla groups of the Second World War. In honour of this, 1 June is marked as Territorial Army Day to mark the anniversary of this service.

Initial recruitment was drawn primarily from former Home Guard personnel. Because of its limited resources and infrastructure, the Territorial Army could not yet cover the entire country, and as a result, the Home Guard continued to function in certain regions, albeit in a support capacity to civil police. Eventually, this evolved into the Malaysia Volunteers Corps Department (RELA), which now operates under the Ministry of Home Affairs and supports both the Royal Malaysia Police and the Malaysian Armed Forces.

At its inception, the Territorial Army consisted of only two components: the Technical Reserve Force and the Infantry Reserve Force. The Specialist Reserve Force was later added to the TA in 1977. By 1965, the Territorial Army included four infantry battalions, four technical support squadrons, one materiel squadron, and one military police unit. Between the 1960s and 1970s, an additional twelve militia units were raised, named according to their regions, and were incorporated under the Territorial Army's administration.

From 1963 to 1965, the TA of Malaysia included in its ranks elements of the Singapore Volunteer Corps, which would later form part of the basis of the future Singapore Armed Forces and the SAF Volunteer Corps.

=== Centralisation and restructuring ===
Following the 13 May 1969 racial riots, the Territorial Army was temporarily placed under a unified Malaysian Army command and tasked with providing a defence buffer against similar incidents in the future. In 1974, the Directorate General of the Territorial Army (Malay: Jabatanarah Askar Wataniah) underwent restructuring, initiating a major transformation of the force.

A new initiative, known as the Full-Time Mobilisation System (Malay: Sistem Kerahan Sepenuh Masa), was introduced for the Infantry Reserve Force. Under this scheme, selected reservists were employed on fixed-term contracts and assigned to national development projects, such as the construction of the East–West Highway. These units became known as the Askar Kerahan Jalan Raya Timur–Barat (East–West Highway Mobilised Forces) and were organised into four infantry battalions.

On 1 March 1979, all battalions under this mobilisation force were absorbed into the regular Malaysian Army as follows:

- 11th Infantry Battalion, Territorial Army, became the 23rd Battalion, Royal Malays
- 12th Infantry Battalion, Territorial Army, became the 24th Battalion, Royal Malays
- 13th Infantry Battalion, Territorial Army, became the 25th Battalion, Royal Malays
- 14th Infantry Battalion, Territorial Army, became the 9th Battalion, Malaysian Rangers

On 7 February 1980, the twelve local militia defence units were formally integrated into the Territorial Army as infantry battalions, replacing the original Territorial Army formations. These newly reorganised units were upgraded into battalion-level combat formations under the Territorial Army structure. At the same time, the Territorial Army was officially renamed as the Pasukan Simpanan Tentera Darat (Malaysian Army Reserve).

To centralise command, the Malaysian Army established the 51st Army Reserve Brigade on 1 January 1981, the first dedicated brigade-level formation for the reserve force. Subsequently, on 19 February 1981, the 11th Infantry Division was converted into the 11th Army Reserves Division (Malay: Divisyen ke-11 Pasukan Simpanan Tentera Darat), which assumed command over all reserve units, including infantry, technical, and specialist formations.

However, by 1 October 1982, the 51st Brigade was dissolved, deemed redundant due to the formation of the 11th Division. In 1984, the division's role was revised to focus on strategic defence functions, resulting in the decentralisation of reservist command once more.

=== HANRUH concept and expansion ===
In 1988, the Malaysian Army implemented a major reorganisation of the reserve force structure. As part of this initiative, the Army Reserve reverted to its former name, the Territorial Army of Malaysia. During the same period, the Territorial Army was reorganised into four distinct categories. On 15 November 1988, all twelve Army Reserve infantry battalions were upgraded to regimental level and re-designated as the 500-series Reserve Regiments. Additionally, the Reserve Officers Training Unit (ROTU) was formally incorporated into the Territorial Army structure. At this stage, the Territorial Army comprised the following components:

- 500-series Reserve Regiments — 12 regiments
- Technical Units
  - Field Engineer Squadrons
  - Field Signal Squadrons
- ROTU
- Specialist units
  - Specialist Signal Squadrons
  - Specialist Engineer Squadrons

In 1989, then Minister of Defence Tan Sri Musa Hitam introduced the Total Defence strategy ('Pertahanan Menyeluruh, or HANRUH), which recognised reservists as integral to national defence and not merely as supplementary forces. The policy led to the expansion of combat and service support roles within the Territorial Army and increased the standard of training to align more closely with that of regular units.

In 1998, the Full-Time Mobilisation System was reintroduced, leading to the establishment of the 300-series Infantry Battalions. These units are composed of reservists employed on fixed-term contracts. A total of five battalions were raised, and unlike the earlier version of the Full-Time Mobilisation System, their primary role is border security. They were stationed along the Malaysia–Thailand and Indonesia–Malaysia land borders.

=== Al-Mau'nah Arms Heist ===
On 2 July 2000, an outpost defended by the 304th Infantry Battalion, Territorial Army, was targeted in an arms heist by the Al-Mau'nah, the militant and anti-Mahathir group. (Note: Technically, Al-Ma'unah was an anti-Mahathir extremist group rather than an anti-government militant organisation. Their demands focused specifically on the resignation of then-Prime Minister Mahathir Mohamad, rather than the dissolution of the entire government.) Posing as senior military officers conducting a surprise inspection, the intruders disarmed the personnel and seized a large quantity of weapons, including 97 M16 rifles, four GPMGs, five grenade launchers, and thousands of rounds of ammunition. The group retreated to Bukit Jenalik, Sauk, taking hostages and engaging in a four-day standoff with security forces. Two hostages were tortured and killed. The group surrendered, and its leaders were charged with waging war against the Yang Di-Pertuan Agong. Mohamed Amin Mohamed Razali, along with his lieutenants Zahit Muslim and Jamaluddin Darus, was sentenced to death, while sixteen others received life sentences.

=== Establishment of the Border Regiment ===
In 2008, the five 300-series Infantry Battalions of the Territorial Army were absorbed into the newly established Border Regiment (Malay: Rejimen Sempadan). They continued their original border security roles, thereby streamlining the structure of the Territorial Army and shaping its present-day form.

=== National Defence Policy 2010 and the Malaysian Armed Forces Reserve ===
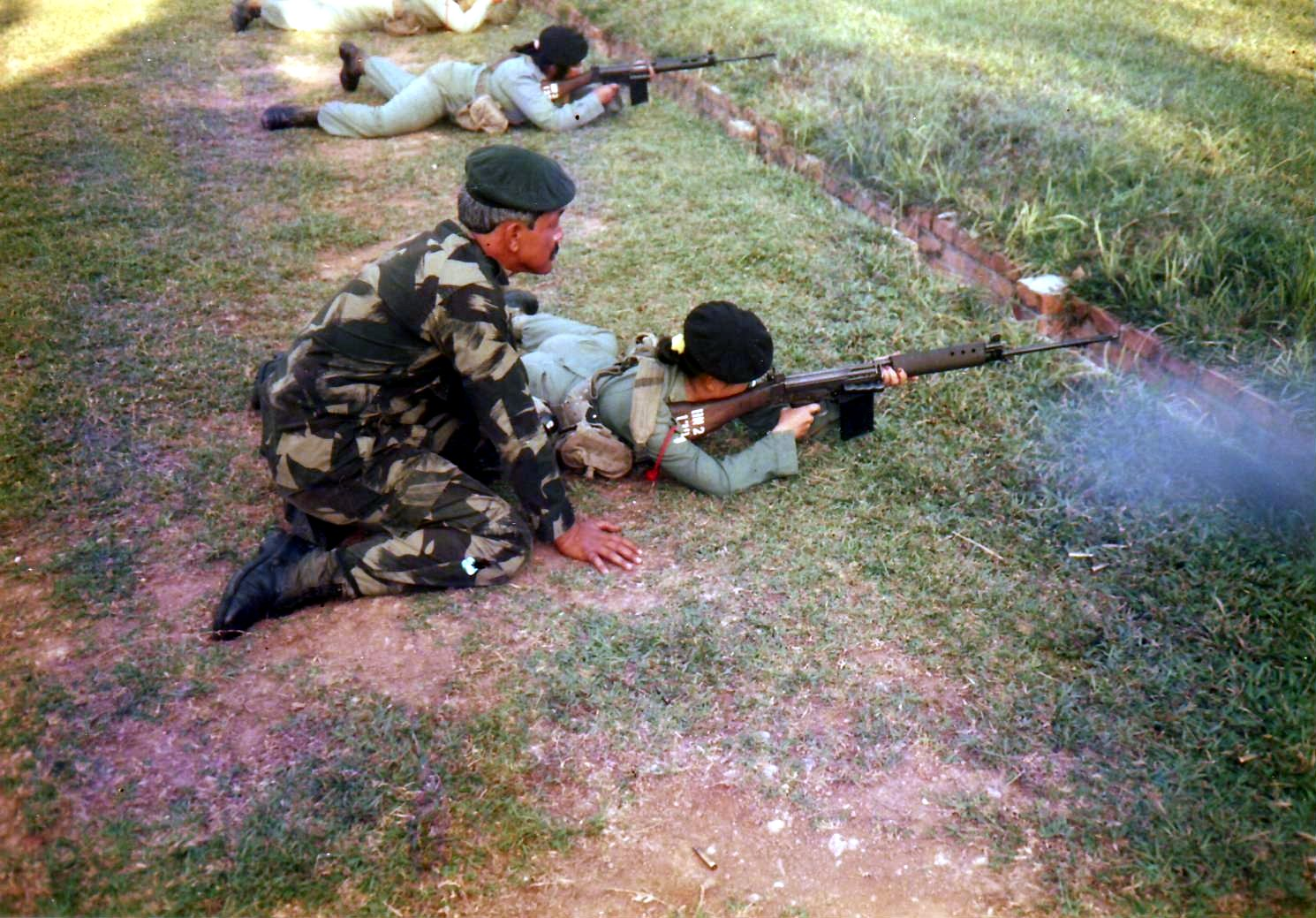
A female reservist of the Territorial Army with an L1A1 SLR, c. 1990s. Notably, she is wearing a combat uniform from the Communist Insurgency era, while her instructor is dressed in the newer camouflage combat attire.

The 2010 revision of the National Defence Policy adopted the HANRUH concept formally and established the Malaysian Armed Forces Reserve (Malay: Pasukan Simpanan Angkatan Tentera). Reservists were declared equal to regular forces in defending the nation. Reserve units from all branches were unified under a single command and began receiving standardised training, equipment, and uniforms. Prior to this, reservists often wore outdated combat dress from the communist insurgency era.

The 500-series Reserve Regiments were integrated into the Malaysian Army's order of battle and placed under the operational command of regular army brigades based on regional alignment.

=== Defence White Paper 2020 and future development ===
The 2020 Defence White Paper, a continuation of the National Defence Policy, outlined plans to further enhance the Malaysian Armed Forces Reserve. The government committed to employing reservists in broader roles beyond emergency deployment. Key initiatives include the following:

- Enhancing training and professionalism among reservists, ensuring they attain skills and standards equivalent to those of professional soldiers in the regular force.
- Assigning reservists to key operational tasks, such as base security, urban defence, and short-range air defence operations.
- Creating a reserve special forces element to conduct reconnaissance, border access control, and counter-insurgency operations, inspired by the British's 21 SAS and 23 SAS, which are reserve special forces formations.
- Expanding the Specialist and Specialised Reserve Force to include emerging fields such as satellite engineering, cybersecurity, systems integration, cloud computing, and big data. These additions are intended to equip the armed forces with the expertise required to confront evolving security threats in the digital and information environments.

These measures reflect a national shift towards the HANRUH posture, in which all military components, including reservists, are expected to play an active and equal role in safeguarding Malaysia's sovereignty.

== Organisation and structure ==
Structure of the Malaysian Army reserve (2025)

Like all components of the Malaysian Armed Forces Reserve, the Territorial Army is divided into two primary categories: the Regular Force Reserve (Pasukan Simpanan Angkatan Tetap) and the Volunteer Force Reserve (Pasukan Simpanan Angkatan Sukarela). The Regular Force Reserve comprises former regular service personnel who have either retired or resigned after completing their mandatory service. These individuals typically retain the rank and specialisation they held during their time in the regular forces. Conversely, the Volunteer Force Reserve represents the standard reservist pathway, consisting of individuals who join through recruitment schemes such as officer commissioning programmes, specialist intake, or general enlistment. These reservists usually begin at entry-level ranks according to their entry route.

Since its establishment in June 1958, the Territorial Army has evolved to include a variety of operational roles. Currently, it is structured into four primary elements:

- Combat element
- Combat support element
- Service support element
- Training element

=== Combat element ===
Within the Malaysian Army, combat elements comprise units assigned with direct fighting responsibilities, such as infantry and armoured formations. These units serve as the primary offensive and defensive force in conventional and unconventional military operations.

The Territorial Army's combat component is made up predominantly of infantry regiments and a single administrative armoured regiment. Units under this element are trained to the same standards as regular army counterparts and can be integrated into brigade-level operational formations.

==== Infantry ====
The infantry element constitutes the largest component of the Territorial Army. It is made up of the 500-series Reserve Regiments, each trained as standard line infantry following the organisational structure of the Royal Malay Regiment, the Royal Ranger Regiment and the Border Regiment. Additionally, the Critical Target Force, originally known as the Critical Target Unit, performs infantry roles with a specific focus on security force tasks. Both formations operate as deployable infantry and may be embedded into the Malaysian Army's broader operational structure. All are modeled on their counterparts in the British Army Reserve, which the TA upon its formation was patterned after.

===== Combat infantry regiments =====
There are currently sixteen active 500-series reserve infantry regiments within the Territorial Army. Each regiment comprises multiple battalions and subordinate companies and is regionally distributed across Malaysia. The regiments are assigned to the command structure of relevant divisions or brigades based on geographical location.

- 501st Reserve Regiment, Territorial Army (Malay: Rejimen 501 Askar Wataniah). Located at Camp Tebrau in Johor Bahru, Johor
  - 1st Battalion. Located at Camp Tebrau, Johor Bahru
    - A Company. Located at Camp Tebrau, Johor Bahru
    - B Company. Located at Camp Kota Tinggi
    - C Company. Located at Camp Pontian
  - 2nd Battalion. Located at Camp Joned
    - A Company. Located at Camp Joned
    - B Company. Located at Camp Tangkak
    - C Company. Located at Camp Segamat
  - 3rd Battalion. Located at Camp Mahkota
    - A Company. Located at Camp Mahkota
    - B Company. Located at Camp Batu Pahat
    - C Company. Located at Camp Sri Iskandar
- 502nd Reserve Regiment, Territorial Army (Malay: Rejimen 502 Askar Wataniah). Located at Camp Sungai Buloh in Selangor
  - 1st Battalion. Located at Camp Sungai Buloh
  - 2nd Battalion. Located at Camp Shah Alam
  - 3rd Battalion. Located at Camp Sabak Bernam
  - 502nd Regiment TA Training Centre. Located at Camp Sungai Tengi
- 503rd Reserve Regiment, Territorial Army (Malay: Rejimen 503 Askar Wataniah). Located at Camp Jalan Tambun in Perak
  - 1st Battalion. Located at Camp Syed Putra
    - A Company. Located at Camp Syed Putra
    - B Company. Located at Camp Parit
    - C Company. Located at Camp Sitiawan
    - D Company. Located at Ungku Omar Polytechnic in Ipoh, Perak
  - 2nd Battalion. Located at Camp Jalan Temenggong, Taiping
    - A Company. Located at Camp Jalan Temenggong, Taiping
    - B Company. Located at Camp Kuala Kangsar
    - C Company. Located at Camp Gerik
    - D Company. Located at Camp Pengkalan Hulu
  - 3rd Battalion. Located at Camp Teluk Intan
    - A Company. Located at Camp Tapah
    - B Company. Located at Camp Teluk Intan
    - C Company. Located at Universiti Tunku Abdul Rahman in Kampar
    - D Company. Located at Sultan Azlan Shah Polytechnic in Behrang
  - 503rd Regiment TA Training Centre. Located at Camp Syed Putra
- 504th Reserve Regiment, Territorial Army (Malay: Rejimen 504 Askar Wataniah). Located at Camp Bukit Keteri in Perlis
  - 1st Battalion
  - 2nd Battalion
  - 3rd Battalion
- 505th Reserve Regiment, Territorial Army (Malay: Rejimen 505 Askar Wataniah). Located at Camp Force 136 in Pahang (Commander: Brigadier General Tengku Amir Nasser Ibrahim Shah)
  - 1st Battalion. Located at Camp Telok Sisik in Kuantan
  - 2nd Battalion. Located at Camp Susur Tembeling, Jerantut
  - 3rd Battalion. Located at Camp Puncak Mas, Raub
    - A Company. Located at Camp Bentong
  - 4th Battalion. Located at Camp Force 136
- 506th Reserve Regiment, Territorial Army (Malay: Rejimen 506 Askar Wataniah). Located at Camp Pengkalan Chepa in Kelantan
  - 1st Battalion. Located at Camp Pengkalan Chepa
  - 2nd Battalion. Located at Camp Machang
  - 3rd Battalion. Located at Camp Sungai Durian in Kuala Krai
  - 506th Regiment TA Training Centre. Located at Camp Sungai Durian
- 507th Reserve Regiment, Territorial Army (Malay: Rejimen 507 Askar Wataniah). Located at Camp Bukit Perwira in Sabah
  - 1st Battalion
  - 2nd Battalion
  - 3rd Battalion
- 508th Reserve Regiment, Territorial Army (Malay: Rejimen 508 Askar Wataniah). Located at Camp Jalan Rasah in Negeri Sembilan (Commander: Brigadier General Tunku Ali Redhauddin)
  - 1st Battalion. Located at Camp Sikamat in Seremban
  - 2nd Battalion. Located at Camp Tampin
  - 3rd Battalion. Located at Camp Kuala Pilah
- 509th Reserve Regiment, Territorial Army (Malay: Rejimen 509 Askar Wataniah). Located at Camp Lebuh Peel in Penang
  - 1st Battalion
  - 2nd Battalion
  - 3rd Battalion
- 510th Reserve Regiment, Territorial Army (Malay: Rejimen 510 Askar Wataniah). Located at Camp Sri Rejang in Sibu, Sarawak
  - 1st Battalion
  - 2nd Battalion
  - 3rd Battalion
- 511th Reserve Regiment, Territorial Army (Malay: Rejimen 511 Askar Wataniah). Located at Camp Ria in Kuching, Sarawak
  - 1st Battalion. Located at Camp Ria
  - 2nd Battalion. Located at Camp Pakit
  - 3rd Battalion. Located at Camp Sematan
  - Kuching Sarawak Polytechnic Territorial Army. Located at Kuching Sarawak Polytechnic
- 512th Reserve Regiment, Territorial Army (Malay: Rejimen 512 Askar Wataniah). Located at Camp Padang Midin in Terengganu
  - 1st Battalion
  - 2nd Battalion
  - 3rd Battalion
- 513th Reserve Regiment, Territorial Army (Malay: Rejimen 513 Askar Wataniah). Located at Camp Jalan Kolam Air in Kedah
  - 1st Battalion. Located at Camp Jalan Kolam Air
  - 2nd Battalion. Located at Camp Kulim
  - 3rd Battalion. Located at Camp Bukit Pinang, Kepala Batas
- 514th Reserve Regiment, Territorial Army (Malay: Rejimen 514 Askar Wataniah). Located at Camp Bukit Beruang in Melaka
  - 1st (Melaka Tengah) Battalion. Located at Camp Bukit Beruang
  - 2nd (Alor Gajah) Battalion. Located at Camp Bukit Beruang
  - 3rd (Jasin) Battalion. Located at Camp Bukit Beruang
- 515th Reserve Regiment, Territorial Army (Malay: Rejimen 515 Askar Wataniah). Located at Camp Mindef in Kuala Lumpur
  - 1st (Putrajaya) Battalion. Located at Camp Mindef
  - 2nd Battalion. Located at Camp Mindef
  - 3rd Battalion. Located at Camp Mindef
- 516th Reserve Regiment, Territorial Army (Malay: Rejimen 516 Askar Wataniah). Located at Camp Kukusan in Sabah
  - 1st Battalion
  - 2nd Battalion
  - 3rd Battalion

===== Security force =====
The security force element within the Territorial Army originates from the former Askar Kerahan Jalan Raya Timur–Barat, which was later designated as the 300-series infantry battalions. These battalions were subsequently absorbed into the Border Regiment following its establishment in 2008.

In 2009, the Malaysian government sought to reinstate the security force function within the Territorial Army. This function was previously represented by the Critical Target Unit (Malay: Unit Sasaran Penting), which has since been upgraded and reorganised into the Critical Target Force, Territorial Army (Malay: Pasukan Sasaran Penting, Askar Wataniah). The primary role of this infantry unit is to safeguard vital national infrastructure and key installations. These include telecommunications towers, water treatment and pumping stations, and military training areas.

The Critical Target Force operates under the command of infantry brigade-level headquarters. Its personnel are primarily recruited on a contractual basis under the Full-Time Mobilised Force (Malay: Pasukan Kerahan Sepenuh Masa) scheme.

Current units under this element include the following:

- Critical Target Unit (Territorial Army), 1st Infantry Brigade (Malay: Sasaran Penting (Askar Wataniah) 1 Briged)
- Critical Target Unit (Territorial Army), 3rd Infantry Brigade (Malay: Sasaran Penting (Askar Wataniah) 3 Briged)
- Critical Target Unit (Territorial Army), 6th Infantry Brigade (Malay: Sasaran Penting (Askar Wataniah) 6 Briged)
- Critical Target Unit (Territorial Army), 7th Infantry Brigade (Malay: Sasaran Penting (Askar Wataniah) 7 Briged)
- Critical Target Unit (Territorial Army), 8th Infantry Brigade (Malay: Sasaran Penting (Askar Wataniah) 8 Briged)
- Critical Target Unit (Territorial Army), 11th Infantry Brigade (Malay: Sasaran Penting (Askar Wataniah) 11 Briged)

==== Armour ====
The Territorial Army currently maintains four dedicated reserve armoured squadrons, structured on a yeomanry-style model similar to the British Army Reserve as an administrative regiment and aligned with the traditions of the Royal Armoured Corps (abbr.: RAC; Malay: Kor Armor Diraja). These squadrons are distributed across different regions and placed under the command of local regular armoured regiments. Personnel within these reserve units receive training consistent with that of the regular army and can be mobilised to support mechanised operations, typically utilising light armoured vehicles.

The formation previously existed as a single unit—the Armoured Squadron (Territorial Army) RAC—composed of four troops. Under the strategic framework of the Army4NextG and the Angkatan Masa Depan policies, these troops were formally upgraded to their current status as full squadrons to enhance the Army's reserve capabilities.

The unit and its current deployment locations are:

- D Squadron (Territorial Army), 1st Armoured Regiment RAC (Malay: Skuadron D (Askar Wataniah) 1 KAD). Located at Camp Batu Sepuluh
- D Squadron (Territorial Army), 2nd Armoured Regiment RAC (Malay: Skuadron D (Askar Wataniah) 2 KAD). Located at Camp Sri Rusa
- D Squadron (Territorial Army), 3rd Armoured Regiment RAC (Malay: Skuadron D (Askar Wataniah) 3 KAD). Located at Camp Lapangan Terbang
- D Squadron (Territorial Army), 4th Armoured Regiment RAC (Malay: Skuadron D (Askar Wataniah) 4 KAD). Located at Camp Penrissen

=== Combat support element ===
Within the Malaysian Army, units responsible for specialised operational roles such as artillery, communications, intelligence, field engineering, and provost duties are classified under the combat support element. These formations play a vital role in supporting frontline combat units by providing essential capabilities that enhance operational efficiency and coordination across the battlefield.

Some reservists serving within this element are recruited through the Specialist and Specialised Reserve Force (Pasukan Simpanan Pakar dan Khusus) scheme. This programme allows civilians with relevant professional backgrounds to serve in military roles that match their civilian expertise. Examples include engineers and communications specialist. The recruitment and employment of such personnel are in line with strategic requirements outlined in the National Defence Policy and reinforced in the 2020 Defence White Paper.

The following Territorial Army units are designated as part of the combat support element:

==== Artillery ====
The Territorial Army includes several artillery units. Although relatively modest in size, six artillery batteries have been established and integrated into the divisional-level order of battle alongside regular artillery units from the Royal Artillery Regiment (abbr.: RA; Malay: Rejimen Artileri Diraja). Four of these are field batteries trained to operate 105mm howitzers and mortars. One is a medium artillery battery equipped with 155mm howitzers, and the final battery provides air defence capability.

- D Field Battery (Territorial Army), 2nd Artillery Regiment RA (Malay: D Bateri (Askar Wataniah) 2 RAD). Located at Camp Mahkota
- D Field Battery (Territorial Army), 3rd Artillery Regiment RA (Malay: D Bateri (Askar Wataniah) 3 RAD). Located at Camp Kemunting
- D Field Battery (Territorial Army), 4th Artillery Regiment RA (Malay: D Bateri (Askar Wataniah) 4 RAD). Located at Camp Segamat
- D Field Battery (Territorial Army), 5th Artillery Regiment RA (Malay: D Bateri (Askar Wataniah) 5 RAD). Located at Camp Desa Pahlawan
- D Battery (Territorial Army), 21st Medium Artillery Regiment RA (Malay: D Bateri (Askar Wataniah) 21 RAD). Located at Camp Syed Sirajuddin
- D Battery (Territorial Army), 31st Air Defence Regiment RA (Malay: D Bateri (Askar Wataniah) 31 RAD GAPU). Located at Camp Tun Ibrahim

==== Communications ====
The Territorial Army maintains specialised reservist signal units tasked with supporting the Royal Signal Regiment (abbr.: R SIGNALS; Malay: Rejimen Semboyan Diraja) in the establishment, maintenance, and restoration of military communication lines. While previously operating as a small specialist formation, the unit underwent a significant expansion in 2024 to reflect the critical role of communications in modern warfare. The current organisational structure comprises five specialist signal regiments and four regular signal squadrons. The specialist regiments are primarily staffed by professional personnel from Telekom Malaysia (TM), ensuring the integration of advanced civilian technical expertise into the Army's signal capabilities.

This evolution culminated in 2024 when the Telecommunications Specialist Signal Regiment Headquarters underwent a comprehensive organisational upgrade, resulting in its formal redesignation as the 56th Telecommunications Specialist Signal Regiment (Territorial Army) R SIGNALS. As an independent formation, the 56th Regiment is not restricted to a specific divisional order of battle. Instead, its units remain highly mobile and are deployable nationwide in accordance with strategic requirements. This flexible command structure ensures that the regiment's technical expertise can be effectively leveraged across various operational theatres as necessitated by national defence priorities.

- 11th Signal Squadron (Territorial Army) R SIGNALS (Malay: 11 Skuadron Wataniah Semboyan Diraja - 11 SSD). Located at Camp Erskine
- 12th Signal Squadron (Territorial Army) R SIGNALS (Malay: 12 Skuadron Wataniah Semboyan Diraja - 12 SSD). Located at Camp Sungai Ara
- 13th Signal Squadron (Territorial Army) R SIGNALS (Malay: 13 Skuadron Wataniah Semboyan Diraja - 13 SSD). Located at Camp Terendak
- 14th Signal Squadron (Territorial Army) R SIGNALS (Malay: 14 Skuadron Wataniah Semboyan Diraja - 14 SSD). Located at Camp Muara Tuang
- 56th Telecommunications Specialist Signal Regiment (Territorial Army) R SIGNALS (Malay: 56 Rejimen Semboyan Pakar Telekom (Askar Wataniah) RSD). Located at Camp Mindef
- 561st Telecommunications Specialist Signal Regiment (Territorial Army) R SIGNALS (Malay: 561 Skuadron, Rejimen Semboyan Pakar Telekom (Askar Wataniah) RSD). Located at TM Jalan Raja Chulan
- 562nd Telecommunications Specialist Signal Regiment (Territorial Army) R SIGNALS (Malay: 562 Skuadron, Rejimen Semboyan Pakar Telekom (Askar Wataniah) RSD). Located at TM Kuantan
- 563rd Telecommunications Specialist Signal Regiment (Territorial Army) R SIGNALS (Malay: 563 Skuadron, Rejimen Semboyan Pakar Telekom (Askar Wataniah) RSD). Located at TM Taiping
- 564th Telecommunications Specialist Signal Regiment (Territorial Army) R SIGNALS (Malay: 564 Skuadron, Rejimen Semboyan Pakar Telekom (Askar Wataniah) RSD). Located at TM Kuching

==== Field engineering ====
The Territorial Army operates eight engineering units and a dedicated headquarters under the administrative and operational framework of the Royal Engineers Regiment (abbr.: RE; Malay: Rejimen Askar Jurutera Diraja). This formation comprises a combination of field and specialised engineering squadrons designed to meet diverse military requirements. Field engineering squadrons are tasked with providing combat engineering and construction services; these units are typically integrated into divisional-level commands to support regional operations. In contrast, specialised squadrons remain highly mobile and are deployable nationwide according to strategic and operational priorities.

- Engineering Line of Communication Headquarters RE (Malay: Markas RAJD Pakar). Located at Camp Mindef
- 21st Field Squadron (Territorial Army) RE (Malay: 21 Skuadron (Askar Wataniah) RAJD). Located at Camp Tun Ibrahim
- 22nd Field Squadron (Territorial Army) RE (Malay: 22 Skuadron (Askar Wataniah) RAJD). Located at Camp Mahkota
- 23rd Field Squadron (Territorial Army) RE (Malay: 23 Skuadron (Askar Wataniah) RAJD). Located at Camp Jalan Pusara
- 24th Field Squadron (Territorial Army) RE (Malay: 24 Skuadron (Askar Wataniah) RAJD). Located at Camp Sangro
- 40th Port Service Specialist Regiment (Territorial Army) RE (Malay: 40 Rejimen Pakar Pelabuhan (Askar Wataniah) RAJD). Located at Camp Mindef
- 50th Railway Service Specialist Regiment (Territorial Army) RE (Malay: 50 Rejimen Pakar Keretapi (Askar Wataniah) RAJD). Located at Camp Mindef
- 60th Water Service Specialist Regiment (Territorial Army) RE (Malay: 60 Rejimen Pakar Air (Askar Wataniah) RAJD). Located at Camp Mindef
- 70th Electric Generator Specialist Regiment (Territorial Army) RE (Malay: 70 Rejimen Pakar Janaelektrik (Askar Wataniah) RAJD). Located at Camp Mindef

The 40th Squadron is responsible for defending and maintaining port operations in cooperation with port auxiliary police. The 50th Squadron consists of railway personnel primarily from Malaya Railways (KTM) and Trans Borneo Railways and focuses on railway maintenance and rapid repair. The 60th Squadron ensures water supply continuity during disruptions or sabotage. The 70th Squadron, composed of Tenaga Nasional Berhad (TNB) staff, focuses on ensuring uninterrupted power supply to critical military infrastructure.

==== Provost ====
Reservists may also be assigned to provost duties. Four Territorial Army Military Police Companies are currently operational and function under the Royal Military Police Corps (abbr.: RMC; Malay: Kor Polis Tentera Diraja). These units are responsible for enforcing military discipline and regulations within Malaysian Army installations.

In addition, certain public and government institutions contribute personnel to the Territorial Army Military Police. For example, the security personnel of University of Technology Malaysia (UTM) have served as part of the Territorial Army component of the 7th Military Police Company, Royal Military Police.

The four Territorial Army Military Police Companies are as follows:

- 11th Military Police Company (Territorial Army) RMP (Malay: 11 Kompeni (Askar Wataniah) KPTD). Located at Camp Penrissen
- 12th Military Police Company (Territorial Army) RMP (Malay: 12 Kompeni (Askar Wataniah) KPTD). Located at Camp Batu Uban
- 13th Military Police Company (Territorial Army) RMP (Malay: 13 Kompeni (Askar Wataniah) KPTD). Located at Camp Sungai Buloh
- 14th Military Police Company (Territorial Army) RMP (Malay: 14 Kompeni (Askar Wataniah) KPTD). Located at Camp Batu Sepuluh

==== Intelligence ====
Reservists are also eligible to serve within intelligence roles, primarily in support and counterintelligence capacities. One Territorial Army Intelligence Company has been established as part of the Royal Intelligence Corps (abbr.: R INT; Malay: Kor Risik Diraja).

- 12th Intelligence Company (Territorial Army) R INT (Malay: 12 Kompeni Perisikan (Askar Wataniah) KRD). Located at Camp Lapangan Terbang

=== Service support element ===
In the Malaysian Army, units that do not fall under the combat or combat support categories are classified as part of the service support element. The Territorial Army maintains several units within this category to provide essential logistical and technical services to support operational readiness.

==== Electrical and Mechanical Engineering ====
The Territorial Army maintains two Electrical and Mechanical Engineering Field Workshops, located in Ipoh and Kuala Lumpur. These units are composed of reservists attached to the Corps of Royal Electrical and Mechanical Engineer (abbr.: REME; Malay: Kor Jurutera Letrik dan Jentera Diraja) and are trained in vehicle maintenance, mechanical and electrical repairs, and the upkeep of equipment and other technical assets within the Territorial Army.

Historically, four additional division-level workshops were based in Taiping, Melaka, Kuantan, and Kuching. However, these have since been decommissioned, leaving only two operational field workshops.

- 31st Field Workshop (Territorial Army) REME (Malay: 31 Woksyop Medan (Askar Wataniah) KJLJD). Located at Camp Remelis
- 41st Field Workshop (Territorial Army) REME (Malay: 41 Woksyop Medan (Askar Wataniah) KJLJD). Located at Camp Batu Kentonmen

==== Logistic ====
The Territorial Army logistic element comprises five transport companies, one supply company, and one air despatch platoon. These units are attached to the Royal Logistic Corps (abbr.: RLC; Malay: Kor Pekhidmatan Diraja) and responsible for the transportation of personnel and materiel, supply chain operations, and aerial delivery of logistical support.

- 7th Supply Company (Territorial Army) RLC (Malay: 7 Kompeni Bantuan (Askar Wataniah) KPD). Located at Camp Mindef
- 11th Logistic Company (Territorial Army) RLC (Malay: 11 Kompeni Angkut (Askar Wataniah) KPD). Located at Camp Rasah
- 12th Logistic Company (Territorial Army) RLC (Malay: 12 Kompeni Angkut (Askar Wataniah) KPD). Located at Camp Ipoh
- 13th Logistic Company (Territorial Army) RLC (Malay: 13 Kompeni Angkut (Askar Wataniah) KPD). Located at Camp Mindef
- 14th Logistic Company (Territorial Army) RLC (Malay: 14 Kompeni Angkut (Askar Wataniah) KPD). Located at Camp Tebrau
- 15th Logistic Company (Territorial Army) RLC (Malay: 15 Kompeni Angkut (Askar Wataniah) KPD). Located at Camp Desa Pahlawan
- 17th Air Delivery Platoon (Territorial Army) RLC (Malay: 17 Platun Hantaran Udara (Askar Wataniah) KPD). Located at Camp Kemunting

==== Ordnance ====
The Territorial Army maintains a single unit dedicated to ordnance duties, responsible for the provision and management of military stores, ammunition, and other materiel. This unit attached to the Royal Ordnance Corps (abbr.: ROC; Malay: Kor Ordnans Diraja) and supports operations within the Kuala Lumpur Garrison.

- 51st Ordnance Company (Territorial Army) ROC (Malay: 51 Kompeni Ordnans (Askar Wataniah) KOD). Located at Camp Batu Kentonmen

Previously, additional brigade-level ordnance teams were maintained by the Territorial Army, but these have since been disbanded.

==== Medical ====
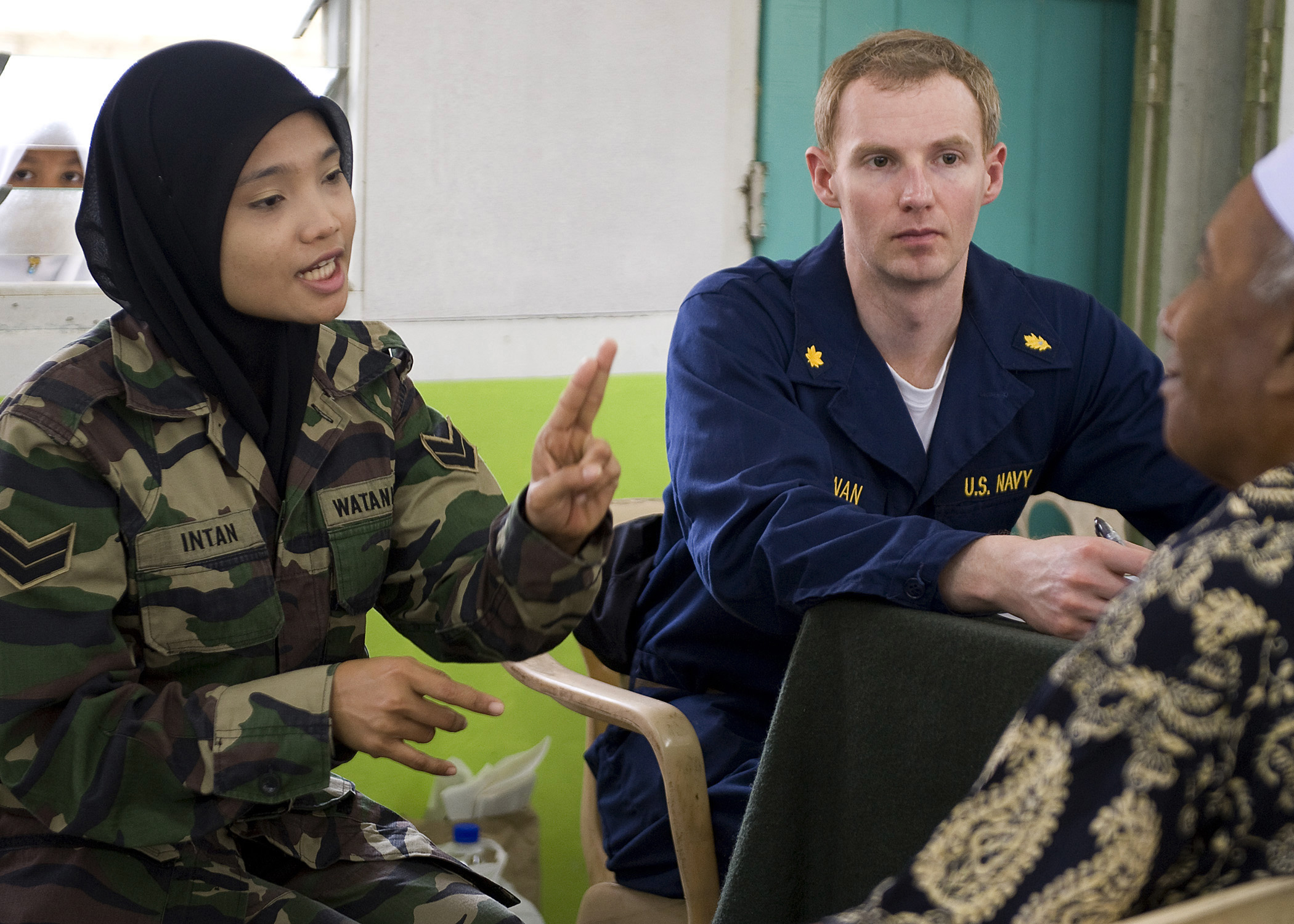
Territorial Army Corporal Intan Badri, observed by US Navy Lieutenant Commander Scott Bannan, screening a patient during a CARAT Malaysia 2009 medical civil action project at Seberan Tayor Primary School in Kuantan, Malaysia, on 24 June 2009.

The Territorial Army maintains two reserve medical companies, situated in Peninsular and East Malaysia, which are composed of reservists with professional medical backgrounds. These personnel are formally attached to the Royal Medical Corps (abbr.: RMC; Malay: Kor Kesihatan Diraja) and are integrated into the broader army medical battalion structure to provide essential healthcare services during both peacetime and military operations.

In contrast to the expansion observed in other Territorial Army branches, the medical reserve component has undergone a significant reduction in scale. Previously organised as a formation of four companies, the unit was restructured into two companies:

- 11th Field Medical Company (Territorial Army) RMC (Malay: 11 Kompeni Medan Perubatan (Askar Wataniah)). Located at Camp Semenggoh
- 12th Field Medical Company (Territorial Army) RMC (Malay: 12 Kompeni Medan Perubatan (Askar Wataniah)). Located at Camp Kubang Kerian (Universiti Sains Malaysia Kubang Kerian Campus)

=== Training element ===
==== Reserve Officers Training Unit ====
The Reserve Officers Training Unit (abbr.: ROTU, Malay: Pasukan Latihan Pegawai Simpanan – PALAPES) is a military training programme established for undergraduate students at Malaysian universities, with the objective of commissioning them as reserve officers in the Malaysian Armed Forces. As of 2020, a total of 21 universities and higher education institutions in Malaysia host ROTU programmes affiliated with the Malaysian Army.

Officer cadets enrolled in the ROTU programme are regarded as members of the Territorial Army throughout their training. They wear the Territorial Army beret and, upon successful completion of the training programme, are commissioned as officers within the Territorial Army.

In institutions hosting ROTU units, the vice-chancellor or chief executive officer is formally appointed as the commandant of the unit and is granted an honorary rank within one of the branches of the Malaysian Armed Forces Reserve, including the Territorial Army.

==== Reservist Training Unit ====
The Reservist Training Unit (RTU, Malay: Pasukan Latihan Anggota Simpanan) functions similarly to ROTU but is tailored for students enrolled in diploma or certificate-level programmes at public universities and Technical and Vocational Education and Training (TVET) institutions. Like ROTU cadets, RTU trainees are considered members of the Territorial Army during the training period.

However, unlike ROTU officer cadets, graduates of the RTU programme are enlisted into the Malaysian Armed Forces Reserve as enlisted personnel or other ranks rather than being commissioned as officers.

== Future plans ==
According to the 2020 Defence White Paper, which builds upon the framework established by the National Defence Policy, the Malaysian government has outlined strategic initiatives to enhance the role and operational readiness of the Malaysian Armed Forces Reserve. As a major component of this reserve structure, the Territorial Army is expected to play an expanded and more integrated role in national defence.

These initiatives reflect a shift in the perception of reservists, who are no longer regarded solely as a strategic force to be mobilised during emergencies or external conflicts. Instead, reservists are being positioned as an operationally ready and flexible component of the armed forces, capable of deployment alongside regular units during both peacetime and wartime missions.

To support this strategic transformation, several key proposals have been introduced:

- Assign operational responsibilities to reservists in key areas, such as base security, urban defence, and short-range air defence operations.
- Establish a dedicated special forces unit within the reserve force, intended to provide rapid response capabilities in areas such as reconnaissance, border security, and counter-insurgency. This concept is modelled on the British 21st and 23rd Special Air Service Regiments, which operate as reserve special forces.
- Expand the scope of the Specialist and Specialised Reserve Force to include personnel with technical expertise in critical domains such as satellite engineering, cybersecurity, systems integration, cloud computing, and big data. These fields are considered vital for enhancing the Malaysian Armed Forces' capabilities in information and digital warfare.

These proposals form part of a broader strategy aimed at achieving a total defence concept, in which all elements of the military, including the Territorial Army and other reserve components, are integrated into the national security architecture and prepared for a range of contemporary and future threats.

== Valour ==
Although the Territorial Army functions as a reserve force, its members have demonstrated courage and dedication equal to that of regular army personnel. Over the years, several reservists have been recognised with significant military honours for their bravery in the line of duty.

One notable example is then-Private Ielias Ibrahim, who was awarded the Pingat Gagah Berani (Star of the Commander of Valour), Malaysia's second-highest gallantry award. On 15 August 1977, during a routine patrol near the construction site of the East–West Highway in Gerik, Perak, his five-man team was ambushed by approximately 30 communist insurgents. All of his comrades were shot, including one who was critically wounded, leaving Ielias as the only uninjured soldier. He held his position and defended his team for three hours until reinforcements arrived.

== Notable members ==
The following individuals are among the notable figures who have served or are currently serving in the Malaysian Territorial Army as reservists:

- Aizat Amdan – A Malaysian singer-songwriter and former contestant on Akademi Fantasia. He was the winner of the 2009 Anugerah Juara Lagu, a prestigious Malaysian music award. In 2011, he enlisted as a reservist in the Territorial Army alongside several other public figures.
- Ana Raffali – A Malaysian singer-songwriter and winner of the 2010 Anugerah Juara Lagu. She joined the Territorial Army in 2011 as part of a celebrity recruitment initiative.
- Ashraf Muslim – A Malaysian actor active since 2008 and recipient of several acting awards, including Best Actor (TV Series) at the 2017 Anugerah Skrin. He was commissioned as a second lieutenant through the Reserve Officers Training Unit (ROTU) at Universiti Teknologi MARA (UiTM), although he remained inactive for a time due to his acting career. He resumed active service as a reservist in 2023 and was promoted to lieutenant in 2024.
- David Teo – A film producer and director with Metrowealth. He enlisted in the Territorial Army in 2011 and has actively encouraged fellow artists to join the reserve force. In recognition of his contributions, he was appointed Honorary major.
- Ielias Ibrahim PGB – The only known Territorial Army soldier to be awarded the Pingat Gagah Berani (Star of the Commander of Valour), Malaysia's second-highest gallantry award. In August 1977, while serving as a private with the East–West Highway Mobilised Force, his five-man patrol was ambushed by approximately 30 communist insurgents. Ielias single-handedly held off the attackers for three hours after the rest of his patrol was incapacitated, resulting in the deaths of three enemy combatants. He retired in 1998 with the rank of Warrant Officer First Class.
- Intan Ladyana – A Malaysian actress, model, and film director who began her career in 2005. Her accolades include Best Supporting Actress at the 24th Festival Filem Malaysia and Best Actress (Film) at the 2012 Anugerah Skrin. She joined the Territorial Army in 2011.
- Khairy Jamaluddin – A former politician, political analyst, and public figure who served as Minister of Youth and Sports, Minister of Science, Technology and Innovation, and Minister of Health between 2013 and 2021. He joined the Territorial Army in 2010 and completed the Basic Parachute Course at the Special Warfare Training Centre in 2011. He was later appointed Commander of the 508th Reserve Regiment with the rank of brigadier general in recognition of his support for youth recruitment into the reserves. Following political developments in 2018, he resigned his commission.
- Mohd Nor Bond – A former seafearer who retired with the rank of sea captain before becoming a film director and actor. He joined the Territorial Army in 2011 and currently serves as a major in the Royal Logistics Corps (Territorial Army).
- Nurul Hidayah Ahmad Zahid – An entrepreneur and former television host. She enlisted in the Territorial Army in 2011 and currently serves as a captain with the 1st (Putrajaya) Battalion, 515th Reserve Regiment. She is the daughter of Ahmad Zahid Hamidi, Malaysia's current Deputy Prime Minister.
- Siti Nurhaliza – One of Malaysia's most prominent recording artists, with numerous national and international awards to her name. She joined the Territorial Army in 2011 as a reservist.
- Shaheizy Sam – A Malaysian actor recognised both locally and regionally, including winning the 2013 Southeast Asian Best Actor Award and Most Popular Star at the 2014 Anugerah Bintang Popular Berita Harian. He enlisted as a reservist in 2011.
- Tuanku Syed Faizuddin Putra Jamalullail – The Raja Muda (Crown prince) of Perlis, who has served in the Territorial Army since 1981. He has actively promoted military service among the youth in Perlis. In 2004, he was made an honorary member of the 8th Battalion (Parachute), Royal Ranger. He currently holds the rank of brigadier general and has served as commander of the 504th Reserve Regiment since 2008.
- Yeop Mahidin – Malaysian national hero and the first Director of the Territorial Army, widely recognised as the Father of the Territorial Army (Malay: Bapa Askar Wataniah). Born in Perak and an alumnus of the Malay College Kuala Kangsar, he began his career as a civil servant. Prior to the Second World War, he served as Assistant District Officer of Kuala Lipis. During the war, he collaborated with Force 136 operatives to establish the Wataniah Pahang resistance group. After the war, he was appointed Deputy Director of the Home Guard and later became the first Director of the Territorial Army. He retired in 1963 and resumed civil service, eventually becoming Setiausaha Bahagian Kanan in the Ministry of Social Welfare. (Note: Setiausaha Bahagian Kanan (Senior Division Secretary) is the third-highest non-political civil servant within a ministry, ranking below the Deputy Chief Secretary (Timbalan Ketua Setiausaha, TKSU) and the Chief Secretary (Ketua Setiausaha, KSU).) In 1967, he joined the Federal Land Development Authority (FELDA) as Director of Settlers' Affairs.
- Zaki Salleh Yunus – A defence journalist and reserve officer who was commissioned through the ROTU programme at Universiti Teknologi MARA (UiTM).

== Lineage ==
1958	1963 Name changes	1980 Name changes	1988 Name changes
Territorial Army of Malaya (Askar Wataniah Malaya)	Territorial Army of Malaysia (Askar Wataniah Malaysia)	Army Reserve Force (Pasukan Simpanan Tentera Darat)	Territorial Army of Malaysia (Askar Wataniah Malaysia)

== See also ==
- Malaysian Armed Forces Reserve
  - Royal Malaysian Naval Volunteer Reserve
  - Royal Malaysian Air Force Volunteer Reserve
- Australian Army Reserve
- British Army Reserve
- United States Army Reserve
