= Reserve Officer Training Unit =

Reserve officer training programme of the Malaysian Armed Forces

- Pasukan Latihan Pegawai Simpanan ڤاسوكن لاتيهن ڤڬاواي سيمڤنن
- The Reserve Officer Training Unit crest
- Founded: 18 December 1978; 46 years ago
- Country: Malaysia
- Branch: Malaysian Army; Royal Malaysian Navy; Royal Malaysian Air Force
- Part of: Malaysian Army Training and Doctrine Command
- Nickname: "Palap"
- Mottos: Sentiasa di hadapan (English: Always in the front), Sentiasa memimpin (English: Always take charge)
- Colours: Red, yellow and green

The Reserve Officer Training Unit (Abbr.: ROTU, Malay: Pasukan Latihan Pegawai Simpanan – PALAPES, Jawi: ڤاسوكن لاتيهن ڤڬاواي سيمڤنن) is a military training programme designed for undergraduate students at Malaysian universities, with the aim of commissioning them as reserve officers in the Malaysian Armed Forces.

Graduates of the programme are commissioned into the respective service branches of the Armed Forces Reserve, either as Second Lieutenants in the Territorial Army (Askar Wataniah), Second Lieutenants in the Royal Malaysian Air Force Volunteer Reserve (Pasukan Simpanan Sukarela Tentera Udara), or as Acting Sub-Lieutenants in the Royal Malaysian Naval Volunteer Reserve (Pasukan Simpanan Sukarela Tentera Laut Diraja Malaysia).

== History ==
=== Origins: The University of Malaya Reserve Army ===
During the Indonesia–Malaysia confrontation in 1965, thirty students from the University of Malaya, all of whom were alumni of the Royal Military College, volunteered to undergo military training at Siputih Training Camp, Batu Gajah, Perak, during their semester break. On 3 April 1965, the university's academic staff and lecturers established the 1st (University of Malaya) Reserve Army Battalion, Territorial Army (Batalion Pertama Askar Wataniah Universiti Malaya). Owing to the absence of a nearby military installation, early training sessions for staff and students were conducted in a small room within the university's Faculty of Arts and Social Sciences.

As the unit expanded in 1969, the University of Malaya constructed a five-bay wooden building at KM 8, Jalan Damansara, Kuala Lumpur, to serve as the unit's headquarters and training centre. The site, later known as Camp Damansara, was built on university-owned land by the Malaysian Public Works Department under a mutual agreement between the university and the Ministry of Defence. Under this arrangement, the university was required to share the facility with the 11th Infantry Division of the Malaysian Army.

In 1983, the 11th Infantry Division added a garage and instructors' quarters to the facility. However, in 1984, the division relocated to Camp Imphal, leaving Camp Damansara under the sole administration of the University of Malaya.

==== Expansion to other universities ====
With the resurgence of communist insurgency in 1968, the battalion was expanded in 1970 to include three additional institutions: the MARA Institute of Technology (now Universiti Teknologi MARA), the University of Agriculture Malaysia (now University of Putra Malaysia), and the National University of Malaysia (Universiti Kebangsaan Malaysia). These institutions became sub-units of the original battalion:

- 1st (University of Malaya) Reserve Army Battalion, Territorial Army
  - HQ Company – University of Malaya
  - A Company – MARA Institute of Technology
  - B Company – University of Agriculture Malaysia
  - C Company – National University of Malaysia

=== Establishment of the Reserve Officer Training Unit ===
In 1978, Brigadier General Dato' Abdul As Ismail, Commander of the Territorial Army, proposed the formation of a formalised military officer training programme at universities. He presented this idea to vice-chancellors of public universities and the Director of the MARA Institute of Technology. The proposal was well received, and on 18 December 1978, the Chief of Defence Forces and Chief of Army formally approved the establishment of the Reserve Officer Training Unit (ROTU).

On 26 February 1979, the Chief of the Army convened a meeting with university administrators and directed them to establish ROTU programmes at their institutions. The National University of Malaysia was the first to implement the directive, officially establishing its ROTU on 1 July 1979, with Professor Mohd Ghazali appointed as the first commandant and granted the honorary rank of Lieutenant Colonel.

Subsequently, the 1st (University of Malaya) Reserve Army Battalion, Territorial Army, was officially dissolved on 2 February 1980, with the University of Malaya's ROTU established on 5 February 1980, followed by the University of Agriculture Malaysia on 8 February 1980 and the MARA Institute of Technology on 6 March 1980.

By 2017, ROTU programmes had been established in 18 more universities and institutions, including three additional branches of Universiti Teknologi MARA. In the late 1980s, ROTU was officially renamed Pasukan Latihan Pegawai Simpanan (PALAPES).

=== Naval and Air Force Variants ===
The naval variant of ROTU, known as PALAPES Laut, was launched in 1986 at Universiti Sains Malaysia, while the air force variant, PALAPES Udara, was introduced in 1989 at Universiti Utara Malaysia. While all PALAPES programmes operate under a single command structure, the specific military training for each service is conducted by the respective branches of the Malaysian Armed Forces.

== Objectives ==
While the specific objectives of the Reserve Officer Training Unit may vary slightly across different universities and institutions, the core aims are consistent throughout the programme. These core objectives include:

- To introduce undergraduate students to the fundamentals of military training and service.
- To instil discipline, patriotism, and leadership qualities among students.
- To develop a pool of trained manpower from institutions of higher learning who are capable of serving in the Malaysian Armed Forces, either in a regular or reserve capacity.

== Structure of ROTU in universities and institutions ==
The structure of ROTU may differ between universities and institutions, but it generally follows a common organisational framework.

Each ROTU unit is headed by a commandant, an honorary role typically held by the vice-chancellor of the university or the chief executive officer of the institution. The day-to-day leadership and administration are overseen by the Deputy Commandant, who is the senior university or institution staff member in charge of operations.

The Deputy Commandant is supported by a Head Instructor, who is a regular officer from the Malaysian Armed Forces. In larger universities, the Head Instructor usually holds the rank of lieutenant colonel, while in smaller institutions, the rank may be major (Army/Air Force) or lieutenant commander (Navy).

Assisting the Head Instructor are several key personnel, including:

- An Adjutant
- A Regimental Sergeant Major (RSM)

These officers are further supported by regular military officers and enlisted personnel tasked with instruction, logistics, training, and administrative duties.

In addition to regular armed forces personnel, ROTU units also benefit from the involvement of university lecturers and staff who were themselves commissioned as reserve officers during their student years or who remain active in the Malaysian Armed Forces Reserve across its various branches.

== Selection and training of ROTU Cadets ==
Before receiving a commission as reserve officers, ROTU cadets must undergo a structured training programme comprising three phases, each lasting one academic year.

According to Malaysian government statistics published in 2017, the maximum quota for cadets at a given university is 450 cadets across all three phases, with two exceptions:

- The National Defence University of Malaysia (UPNM) is permitted up to 650 cadets. (Note: The National Defence University of Malaysia is a public university that accepts two types of students. The first are officer cadets who are already part of the regular military and will be assigned to their respective units upon graduation. The second are civilian students who are not required to serve in the military after graduating. However, civilian students are required to join ROTU, and while the officer cadets undergo military training, the civilian students participate in their own ROTU training programme.)
- Each campus of Universiti Teknologi MARA (UiTM) is allotted a quota of 105 cadets. (Note: UiTM is a public university with branch campuses in every state across Malaysia. Larger campuses within these branches may have their own ROTU programmes, which operate independently and do not use the ROTU quota allocated to the main campus, UiTM Shah Alam.)

This quota applies specifically to Army ROTU (PALAPES Darat); no official quota figures have been published for Navy (PALAPES Laut) or Air Force (PALAPES Udara) ROTU units.

Participation in ROTU is open to full-time first-year undergraduate students enrolled in bachelor's degree programmes. Applicants must satisfy several physical eligibility criteria as outlined under MK LAT CPL/SIMP 500/3/5/6:

Minimum Physical Requirements
Requirement	Male	Female
Height	162 centimetres (5.31 ft)	157 centimetres (5.15 ft)
Weight	47.5 kilograms (105 lb)	45 kilograms (99 lb)
BMI (Note: In 2025, the Malaysian Armed Forces approved the use of alternative fitness assessment standards alongside the Body Mass Index (BMI). This decision was made in recognition of the limitations of BMI, particularly for individuals who are older, have higher muscle mass, or possess other physical attributes that may render BMI an inaccurate measure of fitness.)	≤ 26.9	≤ 26.9

=== Selection ===
Prospective cadets are known as Bakal Pegawai Kadet (Potential Officer Cadet) and are identified by their intake batch, e.g., Bakal Pegawai Kadet Ambilan 19 (Potential Officer Cadet Intake 19). Selection is conducted in three phases, with the final stage often held at a military facility.

Phase 1: Physical Fitness Test

All candidates must pass the Malaysian Armed Forces Standard Physical Fitness Test, which includes:

- Cardiovascular Test:
  - 2.4 kilometres (1.5 mi) run under 15 minutes.
  - 40 metres (44 yd) sprint under 11 seconds.
- Strength Test:
  - Standing broad jump exceeding 221 centimetres (7.25 ft).
  - 35 sit-ups within 1 minute.

Phase 2: Medical Examination

Candidates must undergo a comprehensive medical screening to ensure they are free from chronic illnesses such as:

- Heart disease
- Asthma
- Hypertension
- Colour blindness

Phase 3: Personality assessment and interview

During the final stage, applicants attend a formal interview, typically conducted at the nearest military base relevant to their ROTU branch. For instance, students from Universiti Malaysia Pahang Al-Sultan Abdullah applying for Navy ROTU are required to attend interviews at the Kuantan Naval Base.

Oath-taking ceremony

Upon successful completion of all three selection phases, candidates participate in a formal oath-taking ceremony, presided over by the commanding officer of the military base. Only after this are they officially designated as ROTU Officer cadet and eligible to begin formal military training in Phase 1.

=== Training ===
The ROTU programme is organised into three progressive phases, each corresponding to the cadet's year of university study. The Army ROTU (PALAPES Darat), the Navy ROTU (PALAPES Laut), and the Air Force ROTU (PALAPES Udara) each conduct their own specialised training syllabus. Although the content is tailored to each service branch, all programmes follow a similar phased structure that culminates in the commissioning of cadets as officers.

Phase	Phase name	Training		
Phase	Phase name	Army ROTU	Navy ROTU	Air Force ROTU
1	Junior Officer Cadet (First-Year Students)	During their first year, officer cadets undergo foundational military training to qualify as second-class riflemen (Riflemen Class II). The training syllabus includes marching drills, weapon handling (specifically the combat rifle), map reading, military customs and etiquette, and fundamental fieldcraft skills.	During the first year, officer cadets are introduced to naval life and basic maritime disciplines. Training includes marching drills, swimming, basic sea survival, weapon handling (combat rifle), maritime knowledge (seamanship), naval customs and etiquette, and elementary sea navigation. This phase provides foundational exposure to the duties and lifestyle of a naval officer.	In the first year, officer cadets undergo foundational training as air force infantry. The programme includes marching, weapon handling (combat rifle), map reading, basic military fieldcraft, and instruction in Royal Malaysian Air Force (RMAF) customs and etiquette. This phase provides cadets with a fundamental understanding of Air Force life and discipline.
2	Intermediate Officer Cadet (Second-Year Students)	In the second year, cadets are prepared for the role of section commander. The training advances to include leadership skills, continued marching and drill practice, enhanced weapon training (including the use of grenade launchers and light machine guns), advanced map reading, and intermediate-level field military knowledge.	In the second year, officer cadets enter the Junior Midshipman phase, where they receive intermediate-level training to prepare them for leadership roles. The curriculum includes marching, swimming, sea survival, maritime knowledge, naval leadership, naval etiquette and customs, basic naval warfare tactics, and intermediate-level sea navigation.	During the second year, officer cadets are prepared for section-level leadership roles. Training encompasses advanced marching, map reading, intermediate field military knowledge, and military leadership. Notably, unlike their counterparts in the Army ROTU, Air Force ROTU cadets receive additional training in pistol handling, alongside continued combat rifle drills. Etiquette, customs, and protocols of the Air Force are further reinforced.
3	Senior Officer Cadet (Third-Year Students)	By their final year, cadets are trained to assume the role of platoon leader. This phase includes advanced marching, military leadership development, and the introduction of more sophisticated weapon systems such as general-purpose machine guns (GPMGs) and rocket launchers. Training also covers advanced field tactics, strategic map reading, and reinforcement of military customs and protocol. At the conclusion of the third year, cadets must undergo an additional 15-day commissioning course, known as commissioning training. This intensive programme focuses on ceremonial drill, leadership evaluation, and preparation for the Passing Out Parade, which formally marks the cadet's commissioning as a reserve officer in the Territorial Army.	The final year, referred to as the Senior Midshipman phase, focuses on advanced naval officer development. Cadets undergo training in advanced marching, swimming, sea survival techniques, maritime operations, naval leadership, naval etiquette and traditions, naval warfare tactics, and advanced sea navigation. As with other ROTU branches, third-year cadets are required to complete an additional 15-day commissioning programme known as commissioning training. This phase emphasises ceremonial drills and prepares cadets for the Passing Out Parade, which marks their formal commissioning as reserve officers in the Royal Malaysian Naval Volunteer Reserve.	In the final year, officer cadets are trained to assume platoon-level leadership responsibilities. Their instruction includes advanced marching, tactical leadership, weapon proficiency (including both rifles and pistols), advanced field military knowledge, and continued emphasis on Air Force customs and traditions. As with all other ROTU branches, third-year cadets are required to complete an additional 15-day commissioning training programme, which focuses on ceremonial drills and formal preparations for the Passing Out Parade, marking their commissioning as reserve officers in the Royal Malaysian Air Force Volunteer Reserve.

=== Post-Training and Commissioning ===
Upon completing all three training phases and the commissioning training, cadets are formally commissioned as reserve officers in the Malaysian Armed Forces Reserve.

- Cadets in three-year academic programmes will graduate and continue their service as reserve officers, often stationed at military units near their home or workplace.
- Cadets in longer programmes (such as engineering or medical degrees) may continue serving with their university's ROTU unit, assisting in instruction and leadership in their capacity as fully commissioned officers.

== Cadets benefits ==
University students actively compete for slots in the ROTU programme due to the wide range of benefits associated with being selected as a cadet and eventually commissioned as a reserve officer in the Malaysian Armed Forces.

=== Military training ===
Cadets undergo structured military training tailored to their respective ROTU branch and training phase. The curriculum mirrors aspects of regular military training, albeit adapted for university-level cadets.

- Army ROTU: Cadets progress through increasing levels of weapons proficiency. First-year cadets train with combat rifles; second-year cadets are introduced to grenade launchers and light machine guns; third-year cadets receive training on general-purpose machine guns and portable rocket launchers.
- Navy ROTU: Training includes seamanship, basic naval operations, sea survival, and familiarity with the functions and roles aboard naval vessels.
- Air Force ROTU: Cadets are trained primarily as Air Force infantry while also being exposed to Royal Malaysian Air Force operations, aircraft types, and base protocols.

=== Allowances ===
Cadets receive monthly allowances funded by the Malaysian Armed Forces. These allowances are uniform across all ROTU branches. In addition to financial stipends, cadets are also provided with meal allowances during training sessions and camps.

Financial allowances as 1 July 2016
Training	Time needed to complete	Rate		
Training	Time needed to complete	Junior	Intermediate	Senior
Local training	240 hours	RM 6.00/hour	RM 6.00/hour	RM 6.00/hour
Continuous training	14 days	RM 53.83/day	RM 58.00/day	RM 62.17/day
Annual military camping	15 days	RM 53.83/day	RM 58.00/day	RM 62.17/day
Commissioning training	15 days	—	—	RM 62.17/day
Bonus for complete attendance	—	RM 520.00	RM 520.00	RM 520.00
Uniform No. 1 (Ceremonial dress) allowance	—	—	—	RM 1,500.00
Uniform maintenance allowance	—	—	—	RM 400.00

=== Accommodation ===
Provision of accommodation varies depending on the university or institution. Some universities allocate specific residence halls for ROTU cadets. For example:

- Universiti of Putra Malaysia (UPM) assigns cadets to Kolej Sultan Alaeddin Suleiman Shah (KOSASS).
- Universiti Utara Malaysia (UUM) places cadets at Inapan Siswa Yayasan Al-Bukhary.

Typically, cadets are offered accommodation for the full three-year duration of their ROTU service.

=== Career pathways in the armed forces ===
Upon successful completion of the ROTU programme and graduation from university, cadets are commissioned as reserve officers and may continue their service by reporting to nearby reserve units. To maintain active reserve status, officers must fulfil a minimum of 70% of annual training requirements. Those who become inactive for extended periods may reactivate their status by reporting to the nearest reserve camp, passing a physical fitness test, and submitting relevant documentation.

ROTU graduates also have the option to pursue a full-time career in the Malaysian Armed Forces by enrolling in the Graduate Officer Cadet Course (Malay: Kursus Pegawai Kadet Graduan), a nine-month officer commissioning programme. ROTU alumni are evaluated on equal terms with other non-ROTU university graduates for entry into this course and are permitted to apply for any military branch, regardless of the ROTU branch they previously served in.

== Future plans ==
=== Special commissioning pathway for ROTU graduates ===
On 5 September 2024, the Ministry of Defence announced plans to streamline the entry pathway for university graduates who have been commissioned through the ROTU programme. This special route is intended to be shorter than the standard Graduate Officer Cadet Course, as ROTU graduates have already undergone three years of structured military training. The first intake under this accelerated pathway is scheduled to commence in 2025, with 100 slots allocated for ROTU graduates.

=== Loan relief for ROTU graduates ===
The Ministry of Defence has also proposed to subsidise 50 percent of the National Higher Education Fund Corporation (PTPTN) loans for ROTU graduates, particularly those from high-demand fields such as Science, Technology, Engineering, and Mathematics (STEM). This initiative effectively positions eligible students as partial recipients of a Ministry of Defence scholarship.

== Cadets ranks structure ==
The ranks of ROTU cadets are modelled after those used by their respective service academies, namely the Malaysian Army Academy, the KD Sultan Idris I for the Royal Malaysian Navy, and the Royal Malaysian Air Force College. The Army and Air Force ROTUs share similar hierarchical structures, whereas the Navy ROTU adopts a distinct rank system based on naval traditions.

=== Army ROTU ranks ===
Army ROTU cadets adopt a rank structure comparable to that used at the Malaysian Army Academy. Cadets progress through ranks corresponding to their year of training, with designations such as Junior Cadet, Intermediate Cadet, and Senior Cadet. Some cadets may also be assigned as "rank-holders" based on performance, leadership ability, and training requirements.

Year	Phase Name	Rank-holder (Malay: Pemegang pangkat)							Regular
Year	Phase Name	Rank-7	Rank-6	Rank-5	Rank-4	Rank-3	Rank-2	Rank-1	Rank-0
4	Commissioned Officer								
4	Commissioned Officer								Second Lieutenant Leftenan Muda
3	Senior Officer Cadet								
3	Senior Officer Cadet	Senior Under Officer Pegawai Rendah Kanan	Junior Under Officer Pegawai Rendah Muda	Regimental Sergeant Major Sarjan Mejar Rejimen	Staff Sergeant Officer Cadet Pegawai Kadet Staf Sarjan	Sergeant Officer Cadet Pegawai Kadet Sarjan	Corporal Officer Cadet Pegawai Kadet Korporal	Lance-corporal Officer Cadet Pegawai Kadet Lans Koperal	Officer Cadet Pegawai Kadet
2	Intermediate Officer Cadet								
2	Intermediate Officer Cadet					Sergeant Officer Cadet Pegawai Kadet Sarjan	Corporal Officer Cadet Pegawai Kadet Korporal	Lance-corporal Officer Cadet Pegawai Kadet Lans Koperal	Officer Cadet Pegawai Kadet
1	Junior Officer Cadet								
1	Junior Officer Cadet								Officer Cadet Pegawai Kadet

=== Navy ROTU ranks ===
The Navy ROTU, affiliated with KD Sultan Idris I (Malaysia's equivalent of the Britannia Royal Naval College), maintains a distinct rank structure. Second- and third-year cadets are both designated as Pegawai Kadet Kanan in Malay; however, their English titles differ based on seniority, with third-year cadets often referred to as "senior midshipmen".

Navy ROTU cadets may also hold "rank-holder" appointments, including Cadet Commanding Officer and Cadet Executive Officer (also known as Division Commander). The structure is further organised into divisions, traditionally named Thana (red) and Zain (blue). In larger units, subdivisions may be used, such as Thana Alpha, Thana Bravo, Zain Alpha, and Zain Bravo.

Cadets from the Malaysian Maritime Academy follow a modified training path due to the requirement of a one-year internship aboard merchant vessels. As a result, they bypass the Junior Midshipman phase (second year), with relevant training redistributed across their first and third years.

The Navy ROTU Rank Structure (except for the Malaysian Maritime Academy)
Year	Phase	Rank-holder (Malay: Pemegang pangkat)				Regular	
Year	Phase	Epaulette	Slip-on	Epaulette	Slip-on	Epaulette	Slip-on
4	Commissioned Officer						
4	Commissioned Officer					Acting Sub-lieutenant Leftenan Muda	
3	Senior Midshipman						
3	Senior Midshipman	Cadets' Commanding Officer Pegawai Memerintah Kadet		Division Commander Ketua Divisyen		Midshipman Pegawai Kadet Kanan	
2	Junior Midshipman						
2	Junior Midshipman					Midshipman Pegawai Kadet Kanan	
1	Officer Cadet						
1	Officer Cadet					Officer Cadet Pegawai Kadet	

=== Air Force ROTU ranks ===
The Air Force ROTU employs a rank structure similar to the Army ROTU, with equivalent responsibilities and progression. However, the Air Force uses distinct epaulettes featuring a dark blue background with yellow stripes, in contrast to the Army's green. The word "MALAYSIA" appears at the base of the epaulette in yellow lettering.

== Ongoing units ==
As of the present, a total of 21 universities and institutions of higher learning in Malaysia have established ROTU under the Malaysian Armed Forces. These units serve as training centres for undergraduate students aspiring to be commissioned as reserve officers in the Army, Navy, or Air Force.

One Air Force ROTU unit was formerly active at Universiti Teknologi MARA (UiTM), Sarawak Branch. It was established in June 2004 but was officially dissolved on 7 July 2013.

Reserve Officer Training Units as the year 2023
No	Institutions	Establishment date	First Commandant	ROTU Branches		
No	Institutions	Establishment date	First Commandant	Army	Navy	Air Force
1	National University of Malaysia	1 July 1979	Lieutenant Colonel (Honorary) Professor Mohd Ghazali	Yes	No	No
2	University of Malaya	5 February 1980	Colonel (Honorary) Royal Professor Ungku Abdul Aziz	Yes	Yes	No
3	Universiti Putra Malaysia	8 February 1980	Lieutenant Colonel (Honorary) Professor Tan Sri Dr. Mohd Rashdan Baba	Yes	Yes	No
4	Universiti Teknologi MARA	6 March 1980	Colonel (Honorary) Associate Professor Nik Abdul Rashid Nik Abdul Majid	Yes	Yes	Yes
5	Universiti Sains Malaysia	7 June 1980	Colonel (Honorary) Dato' Dr. Amir Awang	Yes	Yes	Yes
6	Universiti Utara Malaysia	1 May 1984	Colonel (Honorary) Professor Tan Sri Awang Had Salleh	Yes	Yes	Yes
7	Universiti Teknologi MARA, Arau Campus	1985		Yes	No	No
8	Universiti Teknologi MARA, Dungun Campus	1985		Yes	No	No
9	University of Technology Malaysia	11 April 1991	Captain (Honorary) Dato' Dr. Ridzuan Salleh, RMNVR	Yes	Yes	No
10	Universiti Malaysia Sabah	1996	Captain (Honorary) Datuk Dr. Mohd Harun Abdullah, RMNVR	Yes	Yes	Yes
11	Universiti Malaysia Sarawak	1 July 1997	Colonel (Honorary) Professor Dato' Mohamad Zawawi Ismail	Yes	No	Yes
12	Sultan Idris Education University	1998		Yes	No	No
13	Universiti Teknologi MARA, Malacca Branch	June 2003		Yes	No	No
14	Tun Hussein Onn University of Malaysia	1 October 2003	Colonel (Honorary) Dato' Dr. Mohd Noh Dalimin	Yes	No	No
15	Universiti Malaysia Perlis	3 March 2005	Brigadier General (Honorary) Dato' Professor Dr. Kamarudin Hussin	Yes	No	No
16	National Defence University of Malaysia	2007	Brigadier General Dato' Amir Hashim, RMAF	Yes	Yes	Yes
17	Universiti Malaysia Pahang Al-Sultan Abdullah	2009	Captain (Honorary) Professor Dato' Dr. Daing Nasir Ibrahim, RMNVR	Yes	Yes	Yes
18	International Islamic University Malaysia	13 July 2009		Yes	No	Yes
19	Malaysian Maritime Academy	1 August 2010	Commander (Honorary) David Fredric, RMNVR	No	Yes	No
20	Universiti Sultan Zainal Abidin	3 November 2011		No	No	Yes
21	Universiti Malaysia Terengganu	2015		No	Yes	Yes
22	Universiti Sains Islam Malaysia	28 March 2016		Yes	No	No
23	Universiti Teknikal Malaysia Melaka	16 April 2018		Yes	No	No
24	Universiti Malaysia Kelantan	20 August 2020		Yes	Yes	No

== See also ==
- Reserve Officers' Training Corps
  - Army Reserve Officers' Training Corps – U.S. Army ROTC
  - Naval Reserve Officers Training Corps – U.S. Navy and U.S. Marine Corps ROTC
  - Air Force Reserve Officer Training Corps – U.S. Air Force and U.S. Space Force ROTC
  - Reserve Officers' Training Corps (Philippines)
  - Reserve Officers' Training Corps (South Korea)
