= Royal Malaysian Air Force Volunteer Reserve =

Reserve and volunteer components of the Royal Malaysian Air Force

- Pasukan Simpanan Sukarela Tentera Udara Diraja Malaysia ڤاسوقن سيمڤنن سوکاريلا تنترا اودارا دراج مليسيا
- Founded: 6 October 1993; 32 years ago
- Country: Malaysia
- Branch: Royal Malaysian Air Force
- Type: Military reserve force
- Part of: Malaysian Armed Forces Reserve; Air Force Reserve Headquarters
- Garrison/HQ: RMAF Sendayan, Negeri Sembilan
- Nicknames: Pasukan Simpanan Tentera Udara (Air Force Reserve), PSTU, Angkatan Simpanan Tentera Udara Diraja Malaysia (RMAF Reserve), Air Force Reservist

Commanders
- Director of Air Force Reserve: Colonel Ahmad Rashidi Ithnin RMAF

The Royal Malaysian Air Force Volunteer Reserve (RMAFVR; Malay: Pasukan Simpanan Sukarela Tentera Udara Diraja Malaysia, abbreviated as PSSTUDM; Jawi: ڤاسوقن سيمڤنن سوکاريلا تنترا اودارا دراج مليسيا) functions as the reserve component of the Royal Malaysian Air Force. It was established on 6 October 1993 following a decision by the Board of Ministers, making it the youngest of Malaysia's military reserve forces. (Note: The second youngest, if the coast guard is considered a military organisation. In some countries, such as the United States, the coast guard is classified as part of the armed forces. The Malaysia Coast Guard Volunteer Force, established in 2017, is the youngest militarised volunteer force in Malaysia.) The formation is administered by the Air Force Reserve Headquarters (Malay: Markas Pasukan Simpanan Tentera Udara; PSTU) and forms one of the core elements of the Malaysian Armed Forces Reserve.

The headquarters of the RMAFVR is located at RMAF Sendayan. It is currently commanded by Colonel Ahmad Rashidi Ithnin RMAF, who succeeded Colonel Mohd Shahfreen Baba RMAF in 2026. The commanding officer holds the appointment of Director of the Air Force Reserve (Malay: Pengarah Pasukan Simpanan Tentera Udara). (Note: The Director of the Air Force Reserve also serves as its Chief of Staff. The individual holding this position currently holds the highest executive rank within the Air Force Reserve, until such time as the organisation is expanded back to its previous size.) Historically, the position was designated as the Assistant Chief of the Air Force Reserve (Malay: Asisten Panglima Markas Pasukan Simpanan Tentera Udara) and was held by an officer with the rank of brigadier general.

== History ==
=== Origins: Air Force ROTU ===
The Royal Malaysian Air Force Volunteer Reserve (RMAFVR) was established in response to the need for a dedicated air force reserve component to accommodate commissioned graduates of the Air Force Reserve Officers Training Unit (ROTU) programme. While other branches of the Malaysian Armed Forces already had established reserve elements, the Royal Malaysian Air Force (RMAF) lacked such a structure. The first cohort of Air Force ROTU cadets commenced training in 1988, and upon completing their three-year programme, they had no formal avenue to continue serving as reservists within the air force.

=== Formation of the Royal Malaysian Air Force Volunteer Reserve ===
The issue of an absent air force reserve component was eventually raised in Parliament, and on 6 October 1993, the Board of Ministers approved the formation of the RMAF's own reserve force. It was officially named the Royal Malaysian Air Force Volunteer Reserve (Pasukan Simpanan Sukarela Tentera Udara Diraja Malaysia, abbreviated PSSTUDM). A new command was created for its administration, known as the Air Force Reserve Command Headquarters (Malay: Markas Pemerintahan Pasukan Simpanan Tentera Udara), with its first headquarters located at RMAF Kuala Lumpur.

Following its establishment, the RMAFVR expanded throughout Malaysia, in tandem with the extension of the Air Force ROTU programme to additional universities and higher education institutions.

=== Organisational restructuring and capability expansion ===
In 2012, the RMAFVR underwent a structural reorganisation and capability expansion. The force was categorised into four main components:

- Air Force ROTU (Malay: PALAPES Udara)
- Air Force Reservist Training Unit (Malay: Pasukan Latihan Anggota Simpanan Tentera Udara)
- Reservist Airmen (Malay: Perajurit Muda PSTU)
- Air Force Specialist Reserve (Pasukan Simpanan Pakar Tentera Udara)

By 2020, ten universities in Malaysia had established Air Force ROTU units. The RMAFVR was administratively divided into six geographical detachments:

- Central Detachment
- Eastern Detachment
- Northern Detachment
- Sabah Detachment
- Sarawak Detachment
- Southern Detachment

=== Downsizing and command realignment ===
However, a decline in recruitment for the Air Force Reserve, compounded by the effects of the COVID-19 pandemic, led to a downsizing of both the Air Force Reserve Command Headquarters and the RMAFVR. In mid-2019, the Air Force Reserve Command Headquarters ceased to be led by the Assistant Chief of Air Force Reserve, with Brigadier General Muhammad Shafiq Jahudi RMAF being the last to hold the position.

The leadership structure was revised, and the command was placed under the Director of Air Force Reserve, who concurrently served as Chief of Staff of the Air Force Reserve. The command's designation was also downgraded; the term "Command" was removed, and it became known simply as the Air Force Reserve Headquarters. It was placed under the oversight of the Assistant Chief of Staff (Administration) of the RMAF.

As a result of this restructuring, the RMAFVR was reduced to only two categories:

- Air Force ROTU
- Air Force Specialist Reserve

=== Relocation to Sendayan Air Base ===
In line with the phased closure of Kuala Lumpur Air Base, all RMAF units stationed there began relocating to RMAF Sendayan from January 2018. This relocation included the Air Force Reserve Headquarters and the RMAFVR, which were officially moved in November 2019.

At Sendayan, the Air Force Reserve Headquarters and the RMAFVR was allocated approximately 40 acres (16 ha) for its garrison. The facilities include administrative and training blocks, a jungle survival training camp, a volleyball court, an obstacle and endurance course, and proximity to a shared parade ground used by other RMAF formations.

=== Expansion and future reforms ===
Following a period of downsizing, the Ministry of Defence has initiated plans to expand the reserve forces. This development aligns with the current "Total Defence" concept (Malay: Pertahanan Menyeluruh; HANRUH), which aims to increase the strength of the Malaysian Armed Forces Reserve to a level comparable to that of the regular forces by 2033.

To achieve this objective, a restructuring of the Air Force Reserve began in 2025. By 2026, six new squadrons were established for the RMAFVR. These squadrons are distributed throughout Malaysia and serve as a primary mechanism for implementing the strategies outlined in the 2020 Defence White Paper and subsequent national security frameworks. These reforms are intended to bolster national readiness and ensure that the reserve component remains a resilient and responsive support element for the RMAF.

== Organisation and structure ==
=== Current structure ===
Following a significant organisational downsizing in 2019, the current structure of the Air Force Reserve was formalised in 2026.

- Air Force Reserve Headquarters. Located at RMAF Sendayan in Negeri Sembilan
- Air Force Specialist Reserve. Located at RMAF Sendayan
- Royal Malaysian Air Force Volunteer Reserve (RMAFVR) squadrons
  - No. 181 Squadron RMAFVR. Located at RMAF Subang in Selangor
  - No. 182 Squadron RMAFVR. Located at RMAF Butterworth in Penang
  - No. 183 Squadron RMAFVR. Located at RMAF Kuantan in Pahang
  - No. 184 Squadron RMAFVR. Located at RMAF Gong Kedak in Kelantan
  - No. 185 Squadron RMAFVR. Located at RMAF Kuching in Sarawak
  - No. 186 Squadron RMAFVR. Located at RMAF Labuan in Labuan
- Air Force Reserve Officers Training Unit
  - Central
    - International Islamic University Malaysia Air Force ROTU
    - Universiti Teknologi MARA Air Force ROTU
    - National Defence University of Malaysia Air Force ROTU
  - Eastern
    - Universiti Malaysia Pahang Al-Sultan Abdullah Air Force ROTU
    - Universiti Sultan Zainal Abidin Air Force ROTU
  - Northern
    - Universiti Sains Malaysia Air Force ROTU
    - Universiti Utara Malaysia Air Force ROTU
  - Sabah
    - Universiti Malaysia Sabah Air Force ROTU
  - Sarawak
    - Universiti Malaysia Sarawak Air Force ROTU

==== Air Force Specialist Reserve ====
The Air Force Specialist Reserve is a unit within the RMAFVR that recruits individuals with professional expertise in niche technical and engineering disciplines relevant to the aerospace sector. Fields of specialisation include aerospace engineering, telecommunications engineering, mechanical engineering, and satellite engineering.

Established in 2020, the unit is part of an initiative by the Royal Malaysian Air Force (RMAF) to fulfil the strategic goals outlined in the 2020 Defence White Paper, which emphasised enhancing technical capabilities and integrating reservists into operational roles.

The main role of this unit is to provide technical support to the RMAF and to contribute to the modernisation of its capabilities through the application of current technologies, innovative ideas, and inventions introduced at international technology forums.

The unit is currently led by Colonel Dr. Nafizah Goriman Khan RMAFVR, one of the first Malaysian woman to enter the field of telecommunication engineering, which was traditionally dominated by men. She is a leading satellite specialist at the Malaysian Space Agency and a researcher at the University of Nottingham Malaysia Campus.

==== Air Force Reserve Officer Training Unit ====
The air force variant of the Reserve Officer Training Unit (ROTU) was inaugurated on 22 September 1988 at RMAF Kelapa Batas for Universiti Utara Malaysia. Initially, a new squadron designated as the Universities Air Squadron (Malay: Skuadron Udara Universiti; SUU) was formed for students, with training provided by No. 101 Flight RMAF. Following the expansion of the programme to other tertiary institutions, the SUU was renamed the Air Force Reserve Officer Training Unit (Malay: Pasukan Latihan Pegawai Simpanan Tentera Udara), or Air Force ROTU (PALAPES Udara). No. 101 Flight RMAF was subsequently upgraded to become the current Air Force Reserve Headquarters (Malay: Markas Pasukan Simpanan Tentera Udara).

Trainees enrolled in the Air Force ROTU are automatically considered members of the RMAFVR during their period of instruction. Consequently, ROTU cadets wear the standard RMAFVR uniform and beret. It includes the "PSSTUDM" label on the left breast pocket, which denotes their status as part of the volunteer reserve. At present, nine universities and institutes of higher education across Malaysia host Air Force ROTU units.

== Future plans ==
The Defence White Paper, published in 2020, outlined the future direction of the Malaysian Armed Forces (MAF), including its reserve components. Under this framework, reservists are no longer viewed solely as a strategic force to be mobilised during emergencies or external conflicts. Instead, they are being positioned as an operationally ready and flexible component of the armed forces, capable of deployment alongside regular units during both peacetime and wartime missions.

Several key proposals have been introduced for the reservist force, including:

- Assign operational responsibilities to reservists in key areas, such as base security, urban defence, and short-range air defence operations.
- Establish a dedicated special forces unit within the reserve force, intended to provide rapid response capabilities in areas such as reconnaissance, border security, and counter-insurgency. This concept is modelled on the British Army's 21st and 23rd Special Air Service Regiments and the Royal Navy's Special Boat Service Reserve, which operate as reserve special forces formations.
- Expand the scope of the Specialist and Specialised Reserve Force to include personnel with technical expertise in critical domains such as satellite engineering, cybersecurity, systems integration, cloud computing, and big data. These fields are considered vital for enhancing the Malaysian Armed Forces' capabilities in information and digital warfare.

In line with this strategic direction, the Malaysian Armed Forces Reserve was established to centralise the reserve components across the three branches of the MAF. Although progress was initially slow due to the COVID-19 pandemic, the Royal Malaysian Air Force (RMAF) has since launched several initiatives to strengthen its reserve elements.

=== Development of reserve special forces capability ===
Beginning in September 2019, two reservists from the Air Force Reserve Headquarters were selected to join the RMAF Special Forces Adaptation Programme. The two pioneers, Second Lieutenant Salehin RMAFVR and Second Lieutenant Fauzi RMAFVR, were attached to the RMAF Regiment at Jugra Air Base. While continuing their respective duties and trades within the RMAF, they underwent physical conditioning in preparation for the Special Forces Selection.

Within a few years, they are expected to successfully pass the Special Forces Selection; otherwise, they will be reassigned to their original units. This programme aligns with the objectives set out in the 2020 Defence White Paper, and more reservists are expected to be selected for the programme in the future.

=== Integration of reservists into base security operations ===
As of 2025, the Air Force Headquarters has proposed the expansion of the Royal Malaysian Air Force Volunteer Reserve (RMAFVR) to include detachments at all Royal Malaysian Air Force (RMAF) air bases. Under this proposal, each air base would be assigned an RMAFVR detachment, trained as part of the RMAF Ground Defence Force (RMAF HANDAU). These reservists would be tasked with base security duties and would operate alongside regular RMAF HANDAU personnel in patrol and defensive operations.

This initiative is part of the RMAF's broader effort to realise the objectives outlined in the 2020 Defence White Paper, in which the Malaysian government redefined the role of reservists as an operationally ready and flexible component of the armed forces, capable of deployment alongside regular units during both peacetime and wartime operations.

== Notable members ==
The following individuals are among the notable figures who have served, or are currently serving, in the Royal Malaysian Air Force Volunteer Reserve (RMAFVR):

- Nafizah Goriman Khan – Colonel Dr. Nafizah Goriman Khan RMAFVR is a leading satellite specialist in Malaysia and one of the first Malaysian women to enter the field of telecommunications engineering. With nearly 30 years of experience, she was personally recruited by Sultan Abdullah of Pahang, who also holds the honorary title of Air Commodore-in-Chief of the RMAF, to join the Air Force Reserve. In 2020, she was promoted to the rank of colonel and appointed director of the Air Force Specialist Reserve. She currently serves as a researcher at the University of Nottingham Malaysia Campus and has previously worked at SIRIM and the Malaysian Space Agency.
- Nicol David – Major Datuk Nicol David RMAFVR is a former professional squash player and former world number one in women's squash. She joined the RMAF Volunteer Reserve in mid-2012 to promote youth involvement in military service. In September 2012, she was promoted to the rank of major in recognition of her contributions and status as a national sports icon.
- Tengku Abdul Samad Shah – Brigadier General Tengku Abdul Samad Shah RMAFVR is a member of the Selangor royal family and the brother of the current Sultan of Selangor. (Note: In Malay nobility, the prefix Tengku, along with its variations such as Tunku and Tengkuh, can be translated as "Royal Prince". As a formal title, it is equivalent to "Prince" in English. For example, Tengku Abdul Samad Shah may be referred to as Prince Abdul Samad Shah in English-speaking contexts.) He enlisted in the RMAF Volunteer Reserve in 1993 and played a key role in the establishment of the RMAF reserve component. In 2015, he was promoted to the rank of brigadier general in recognition of his service and contributions to the RMAF and the Air Force Reserve.
- Tengku Musahiddin Shah – Colonel Tengku Musahiddin Shah RMAFVR, son of Tengku Abdul Samad Shah, is also a member of the Selangor royal family. He joined the RMAF Volunteer Reserve in 2021 and was appointed a board member of the Supporting Committee for the RMAFVR (Malay: Jawatankuasa Pendukung Pasukan Simpanan Sukarela Tentera Udara Diraja Malaysia). In 2022, he was commissioned as a military officer by the King of Malaysia and granted the rank of colonel.
- Tengku Zafrul Aziz - Captain Tengku Zafrul RMAFVR is a banker-turned-politician and the current Minister of Investment, Trade, and Industry. He is a descendant of the Langkat and Deli royal families from Sumatra, Indonesia. Prior to his political career, he held senior roles in the financial sector, including serving as Chief Executive Officer (CEO) of Maybank Investment Bank and Group CEO of CIMB Group. He was appointed a senator in the Dewan Negara in 2020 and served as Minister of Finance from 2021. An avid marathon runner, he has been actively involved in sports events. In 2021, he was appointed a board member of the Supporting Committee for the RMAFVR and was subsequently commissioned as a military officer by the King of Malaysia, receiving the rank of captain.

== See also ==
- Malaysian Armed Forces Reserve
  - Territorial Army
  - Royal Malaysian Naval Volunteer Reserve
- Royal Air Force Volunteer Reserve
