= Royal Malaysian Naval Volunteer Reserve =

- Pasukan Simpanan Sukarela Tentera Laut Diraja Malaysia ڤاسوكن سيمڤنن سوكاريلا تنترا لاوت دراج مليسيا
- Founded: 1952; 74 years ago
- Country: Malaysia
- Branch: Royal Malaysian Navy
- Type: Military reserve force
- Part of: Malaysian Armed Forces Reserve; Royal Malaysian Naval Reserve Command Headquarters
- Garrison/HQ: Johor Bahru Naval Base, Masai, Johor
- Nicknames: Naval Reservist, RMN Reserve, Angkatan Sukarela Tentera Laut (Naval Reserve Force)
- Deployments: Malayan Emergency (1948–1960); Cross border attacks in Sabah (1962–present); Indonesia–Malaysia confrontation (1963–1966); Communist insurgency in Malaysia (1968–1989)
- Website: https://simpanan.navy.mil.my/

Commanders
- Current commander: First Admiral Azhar Adam RMN
- Chief of staff: Captain Murthi Subromoniam RMN

The Royal Malaysian Naval Volunteer Reserve (Malay: Pasukan Simpanan Sukarela Tentera Laut Diraja Malaysia, abbreviated PSSTLDM; Jawi: ڤاسوكن سيمڤنن سوكاريلا تنترا لاوت دراج مليسيا) serves as the reserve component of the Royal Malaysian Navy. It operates under the command of the Royal Malaysian Naval Reserve Command Headquarters (Malay: Markas Pemerintahan Pasukan Simpanan TLDM) and maintains a nationwide presence across Malaysia. It is one of the three principal reserve components of the Malaysian Armed Forces Reserve and is the oldest among them in terms of continuous active service.

The headquarters is located at the Johor Bahru Naval Base. The unit is commanded by First Admiral Azhar Adam RMN, who reports directly to the Chief of Navy and the Chief of Defence Forces. The latter concurrently serves as the Commander of the Reserve Force (Malay: Panglima Pasukan Simpanan).

== History ==
=== Early origins: Volunteer military roots in the Straits Settlements ===
The roots of Malaysia's naval reserve can be traced back to 1854 with the establishment of the Singapore Volunteer Rifle Corps in the Straits Settlements. This unit was formed in response to patriotic sentiments among the European expatriate community in Malaya during the Crimean War, which began in 1853. The success of this initiative encouraged the formation of similar military volunteer units throughout British Malaya.

By 1924, these volunteer units in the Straits Settlements were consolidated under a single organisation known as the Straits Settlements Volunteer Force (SSVF). The scope of military volunteer-ism was later extended to include maritime defence. Following the implementation of the Colonial Naval Defence Act of 1931, the Straits Settlements government, in collaboration with the Malayan Naval Force, established a naval branch of the SSVF. This formation, officially known as the Straits Settlements Naval Volunteer Reserve (SSNVR), was created on 27 April 1934 in Singapore. A second branch was subsequently established in Penang in 1938.

The term "Malayan Naval Force" was used to describe Commonwealth naval units, including those from the Royal Navy and Royal Australian Navy, that were based in Malaya. According to the Colonial Naval Defence Act, any Commonwealth naval forces operating in Malaya were considered part of the Malayan Naval Force.

The SSNVR and other militia units were disbanded in 1941 following the Japanese invasion and subsequent occupation of Malaya during the Second World War.

=== Post-war reorganisation and the Malaya Naval Reserve ===
In 1947, two years after the Japanese surrender, the Malayan authorities established an administrative unit known as the Volunteer Records Office. This office was responsible for maintaining service records and managing pensions and allowances for veterans of the Malayan Naval Force. It was staffed by four volunteers. (Note: The Volunteer Records Office is a volunteer-based entity whose four members receive only a volunteer allowance rather than a regular salary. Its primary role is to assist navy veterans with their needs.) Commander H. E. H. Nicholls RN, the last pre-war commander of the Malayan Naval Force, served as head of the office. He was assisted by Lieutenant Commander A. J. P. Henton RN, Petty Officer Sarkawi Bujang, and Petty Officer Abdul Majid Abdul Rahman, all of whom had formerly served with the force.

In 1949, the Malayan government, in cooperation with the Royal Navy, re-established the Malayan Naval Force under the new name of the Malayan Navy. At the same time, the Volunteer Records Office was upgraded to serve as the headquarters of the new navy.

During the early years of the Malayan Emergency, the Malayan Navy created a reserve component known as the Malaya Naval Reserve. In August 1952, this formation was granted royal status and renamed the Royal Malayan Naval Reserve, following the conferment of the "Royal" title to the navy by Queen Elizabeth II. At the time, its headquarters was located in Kuala Lumpur at the site now occupied by Masjid Negara. In 1957, the headquarters moved to Jalan Ampang, Kuala Lumpur, and on 2 December 1977, the site was commissioned as a stone frigate under the name KD Sri Klang, referencing its location in the Klang Valley. (Note: KD stands for Kapal Diraja, which translates directly as "Royal Ship". In comparison to the Royal Navy, Kapal Diraja is equivalent to "His/Her Majesty's Ship" (HMS). All commissioned Royal Malaysian Navy (RMN) vessels carry the prefix KD, KLD (Kapal Layar Diraja – Royal Yacht), or KTD (Kapal Tunda Diraja – Royal Tugboat). RMN ships without the KD prefix are typically on loan to the navy from other entities.)

=== Renaming and formalisation ===
Following the formation of Malaysia in 1963, the reserve force was renamed the Royal Malaysian Naval Volunteer Reserve. It remains the official naval reserve component of the Royal Malaysian Navy and is the oldest continuously active reserve formation within the Malaysian Armed Forces. (Note: The Territorial Army, the reserve component of the Malaysian Army, was established in 1958, and the Royal Malaysian Air Force Volunteer Reserve followed in 1993. Both are significantly newer than the Royal Malaysian Naval Volunteer Reserve, which was established in 1952.)

From 1963 to 1965, the Singapore Naval Volunteer Reserve, established during the British colonial period in 1954, served as the state level formation of the RMNVR in the state. Upon independence, it became part of the basis of the Republic of Singapore Navy.

=== Relocations within the Klang Valley ===
In 1997, the Royal Malaysian Naval Reserve Command Headquarters was relocated from Jalan Ampang to Camp Mindef in Kuala Lumpur, while KD Sri Klang remained at its original site.

In 2003, construction began on a new naval facility at Indah Island in Klang, Selangor, intended to house the National Hydrographic Centre, the Royal Malaysian Naval Reserve Command Headquarters, and serve as the new garrison for KD Sri Klang. On 19 December 2006, this site was commissioned as a stone frigate under the name KD Sultan Abdul Aziz Shah.

=== National Defence Policy 2010 and the Malaysian Armed Forces Reserve ===
The 2010 revision of the National Defence Policy formally adopted the Total Defence (HANRUH) concept and led to the establishment of the Malaysian Armed Forces Reserve (Malay: Pasukan Simpanan Angkatan Tentera). Under this framework, reservists were recognised as having equal status and responsibility to regular personnel in the defence of the nation. Reserve formations from all three services, which include the Territorial Army, the Royal Malaysian Naval Volunteer Reserve, and the Royal Malaysian Air Force Volunteer Reserve, were placed under a unified command. These formations began to receive standardised training, equipment, and uniforms as part of a coordinated national defence structure.

=== Relocation to Johor Bahru Naval Base ===
In 2016, construction began on a new naval base at Masai in Johor. The new base was intended to serve as the future garrison of both the Royal Malaysian Naval Reserve Command Headquarters and the Royal Malaysian Naval Volunteer Reserve unit for southern East Malaysia. Construction was completed on 31 March 2020, and the headquarters officially relocated. The reservist unit based there was commissioned as a stone frigate under the name KD Sri Medini. The Johor Bahru Naval Base is now nicknamed the "Home of the Naval Reservist", replacing the Indah Island Naval Base in Selangor as the principal reservist hub.

== Organisation and structure ==
The Royal Malaysian Naval Volunteer Reserve operates under the command of the Royal Malaysian Naval Reserve Command Headquarters. There are a total of eleven Naval Reserve units across Malaysia, with six based in West Malaysia and five in East Malaysia. Of these, five are designated as stone frigates, serving as commissioned shore-based establishments. The units are as follows:

- Royal Malaysian Naval Reserve Command HQ. Located at Johor Bahru Naval Base in Masai, Johor
  - KD Sri Klang. Located at Indah Island Naval Base in Klang, Selangor
  - KD Sri Likas. Located at Sepangar Bay Naval Base in Kota Kinabalu, Sabah
  - KD Sri Manjung. Located at Lumut Naval Base in Perak
  - KD Sri Medini. Located at Johor Bahru Naval Base in Johor
  - KD Sri Penang. Located at Royal Malaysian Naval Volunteer Reserve Training Centre in Gelugor, Penang
  - Kuantan Naval Volunteer Reserve. Located at Kuantan Naval Base in Pahang
  - Kuching Naval Volunteer Reserve. Located at Sarawak River in Kuching, Sarawak
  - Labuan Naval Volunteer Reserve. Located at Labuan Naval Base in Labuan
  - Sandakan Naval Volunteer Reserve. Located at Sandakan Naval Base in Sandakan, Sabah
  - Setiu Naval Volunteer Reserve. Located at Setiu in Terengganu
  - Tawau Naval Volunteer Reserve. Located at Tawau in Sabah

== Future plans ==
According to the 2020 Defence White Paper, which builds upon the framework established by the National Defence Policy, the Malaysian government has outlined strategic initiatives to enhance the role and operational readiness of the Malaysian Armed Forces Reserve. As one of the primary components of this reserve structure, the Royal Malaysian Naval Volunteer Reserve is expected to assume a more integrated and expanded role in national defence.

These initiatives reflect a shift in the perception of reservists, who are no longer regarded solely as a strategic force to be mobilised during emergencies or external conflicts. Instead, reservists are being positioned as an operationally ready and flexible component of the armed forces, capable of deployment alongside regular units during both peacetime and wartime missions.

To support this strategic transformation, several key proposals have been introduced:

- Assign operational responsibilities to reservists in key areas, such as base security, urban defence, and short-range air defence operations.
- Establish a dedicated special forces unit within the reserve force, intended to provide rapid response capabilities in areas such as reconnaissance, border security, and counter-insurgency. This concept is modelled on the British Army's 21st and 23rd Special Air Service Regiments and the Royal Navy's Special Boat Service Reserve, which operate as reserve special forces formations.
- Expand the scope of the Specialist and Specialised Reserve Force to include personnel with technical expertise in critical domains such as satellite engineering, cybersecurity, systems integration, cloud computing, and big data. These fields are considered vital for enhancing the Malaysian Armed Forces' capabilities in information and digital warfare.

These proposals are part of a broader strategy to realise the concept of total defence (HANRUH), whereby all elements of the military, including reserve components, are fully integrated into the national security structure and are prepared to respond to modern and emerging threats.

In 2018, six personnel from the Royal Malaysian Naval Volunteer Reserve successfully completed the Malaysian Special Forces Selection and were awarded the magenta beret of the Naval Special Forces (PASKAL). This achievement marked a significant milestone and may have influenced the inclusion of a dedicated special forces reserve unit in the 2020 Defence White Paper, potentially paving the way for the future establishment of a special operations reserve capability within Malaysia.

== See also ==
- Malaysian Armed Forces Reserve
  - Territorial Army
  - Royal Malaysian Air Force Volunteer Reserve
- Royal Naval Reserve
- Royal Australian Naval Reserve
