= Yeop Mahidin Mohamed Shariff =

Yeop Mahidin bin Mohamed Shariff (20 February 1918 – 1999) was the first Director of Rejimen Askar Wataniah, the reserves component of the Malaysian Army. He was widely regarded as the “Father of Wataniah” for his efforts in establishing the Rejimen Askar Wataniah as a credible force.

== Biography ==
Yeop Mahidin was born on 20 February 1918 in Kampung Lambor Kiri, Parit, Perak to a Customs officer. He was educated at the Anderson School and a keen boxer who was a bantam weight champion. He was a keen footballer, and was active in field hockey and cricket, in which he was once given the "Batsman of the Year" award.

One of his relatives is Abdullah CD, a guerilla fighter who later join the Communist Party of Malaya (CPM), and later founded the 10th Malay Regiment, a predominant Malay guerilla unit in CPM.

According to his family, Yeop Mahidin came from a long line of silat exponents who served as protectors to the Perak Sultanate. His children, both the men and the women in the family are known as efficient fighters with a style of fighting handed down over generations. One of his sons, named Mokhtar, nicknamed Apin, went on to establish the largest silat schools in the United Kingdom. He is known as the Mahaguru Silat Gayong or Grand Master of Silat Gayong.

He aspired to join the Malay Regiment but was discouraged to do so by his headmaster L.D Whitfield who wanted him to join the Malayan Civil Service. In 1937, Yeop Mahidin went to the Malay College to prepare him for life in the Civil Service.

In 1938, Yeop Mahidin was appointed a magistrate in Telok Anson (now Teluk Intan) before transferring to Kajang in 1939. In 1940 he again transferred, this time to Kuala Lipis as Assistant District Officer. He joined the local Malay State Volunteer Rifles Reserve and commissioned a 2nd Lieutenant.

== World War II ==
When World War II broke out, Yeop Mahidin formed a resistance group called the Pahang Wataniah. The unit had a strength of 254 men and was assisted by Force 136, which assigned Major Richardson to help train the unit. His bravery and exploits earned him the nickname "Singa Melayu" (Malay Lion). The main success of the team is still in the memories of Dato 'Yoep is the success they ambushed the Japanese Army, where a group of 20 locals under the leadership of Lt Confident to kill 30 to 40 people and destroyed 41 Japanese military vehicles. This success is the result of planning and selection of an ambush spot by Dato 'Yoep as the head of the team.

During 1950, the team 'Home Guard was formed and Dato 'Yoep was appointed as Deputy Director. The primary goal of the Home Guard is to assist the security forces in the face of the communist threat. In 1958, the team disbanded and Dato 'Yoep has been appointed as Chief Food Denial' Officer 'in Perak. When the Territorial Army was established to replace the Home Guard, Dato 'Yoep was appointed as the first Director of the Territorial Army with the rank of Colonel. In addition, he was also Chairman of the Armed Forces Boxing and Football. Then in November, 1963, Dato 'Yoep have left the military and became a District Officer of Kuala Lipis. In 1965, he was appointed as Secretary, Ministry of Social Welfare and in 1967 joined Felda settlers Affairs Director.

In 1945, Yeop Mahidin was made Commander of local resistance forces and made a Major. He was offered by the British to undergo military training in Britain but he refused. Captain Abdul Razak bin Hussein (later Malaysia's Second Prime Minister) and Lieutenant Ghazali bin Shafie (a renowned Malaysian Foreign Minister) was sent instead.

== Founding of Rejimen Askar Wataniah ==
In 1950, the British Malaya government formed the "Home Guard" and Yeop Mahidin was made the Deputy Director of the Malayan Home Guard. The Home Guard was tasked with static local Defence and manned checkpoints that curbed the flow of supplies to Communist Terrorists.

In 1958, as the threat of the communist terrorists receded, the Malayan Home Guard was disbanded. The Malayan Territorial Army was formed in 1958 with the passing of the Territorial Army Ordinance 1958. The Territorial Army soon changed its name to Askar Wataniah. Yeop Mahidin was made the First Director of Askar Wataniah with the rank of Colonel.

== Retirement ==
Yeop Mahidin left the Askar Wataniah in 1963 when he was made the District Officer of Kuala Lipis. Yeop Mahidin was also a renowned Silat exponent and instructor.

He was also active in the Malaysian Olympic Movement was the Chef-de-Mission of the Malaysian contingent during the 1971 South East Asian Peninsular Games in Kuala Lumpur.

== Sources ==
- KOLONEL DATO' YEOP MAHIDIN BIN MOHAMED SHAFIFF
- The 1967 Ramon Magsaysay Award for Community Leadership BIOGRAPHY of Tun Abdul Razak
- The Japanese Occupation of Malaya, 1941-45 By Paul H. (Lecturer in History, National University of Singapore, Singapore) Kratoska pg 294
