= Ielias Ibrahim =

Former Malaysian soldier

Ielias Ibrahim PGB PKH PPA PPS BAT
- Born: 30 April 1956 (age 70); Batu 16, Batu Kurau, Taiping, Perak, Federation of Malaya
- Military career
- Allegiance: Malaysia
- Branch: Malaysian Army
- Service years: 1976–1998
- Rank: Warrant Officer I
- Service number: 144520
- Units: Rejimen Askar Wataniah; Royal Ranger Regiment

Ielias bin Ibrahim is a former Malaysian soldier. He is notable for being the only soldier from Rejimen Askar Wataniah to have been awarded the Panglima Gagah Berani.

== Army career ==
He first joined the army on 27 December 1976 at the age of 20 and was absorbed into 19 Platoon, D Company of 11 Rejimen Askar Wataniah. His unit's primary duty was to man roadblocks and guard the construction of the East-West Highway through the town of Gerik, Perak.

On 15 August 1977, he was involved in a firefight which earned him the Panglima Gagah Berani. His unit of 5 soldiers (including himself) was given the duty of transporting rations to another military post. En route they discovered a dead monkey on the pathway that they were using. Upon inspection it was decided that the monkey had been slaughtered. After discounting the possibility of an ambush, the unit moved forward only to be mowed down by enemy fire. One Lance Corporal Ahmad Zaki was shot in the thigh, with Pvt Abdul Halim and Pvt Tajudin both badly wounded with shots to the chest. Pvt Ielias managed to jump clear and landed in a bush of thorns which lacerated his outer cornea.

The enemy, numbering around 30, had effectively surrounded them and were armed with automatic rifles including M16's supplied by North Vietnam. Although they were in a position to destroy the unit, they chose to force the unit to surrender. One of the wounded soldiers, (either Pvt Halim or Tajudin) managed to get to his rifle and tried to continue the fight but the enemy effectively disabled him by wounding both of his arms and shoulders. Enemy fire continued to rain upon him until he smeared his face with his own blood. Lance Corporal Zaki, who was badly wounded, pleaded to his men to pull him to safety. He however, succumbed to his wounds as a result of blood loss.

Although the unit was effectively down to only Pvt Ielias, he did not waver and found cover behind a mound of termites nests, which are extremely hard and known to be able to withstand direct fire. He brought his FN FAL into action, continuing the fight. The firefight lasted for about 7 hours, in which he fired only 5 shots, killing 3 enemies. Of his 5 shots, only one missed the target with one enemy being shot twice. Halted by the effective fire from Pvt Ielias, the enemy withdrew from the area once they detected military reinforcements arriving.

As a result of his actions, he was conferred with the Panglima Gagah Berani on 29 August 1977 by Yang di-Pertuan Agong Sultan Yahya Petra and with the Pingat Keberanian Handal by Sultan Idris Al-Mutawakkil Alallahi Shah, the sultan of Perak, on 12 December 1977.

By 1977, the threat from communist elements had subsided so his unit was disbanded and he was transferred to 9th Royal Ranger Regiment. He retired from the Army in 1998 as a Regimental Sergeant Major.

== Honours ==
- Malaysia
  - Recipient of the Star of the Commander of Valour (PGB) (1977)
- Perak
  - Recipient of the Conspicuous Gallantry Medal (PKH) (1977)
- Malaysian Armed Forces
  - Malaysian Service Medal (PJM)
  - General Service Medal (PPA)
  - Loyal Service Medal (PPS)
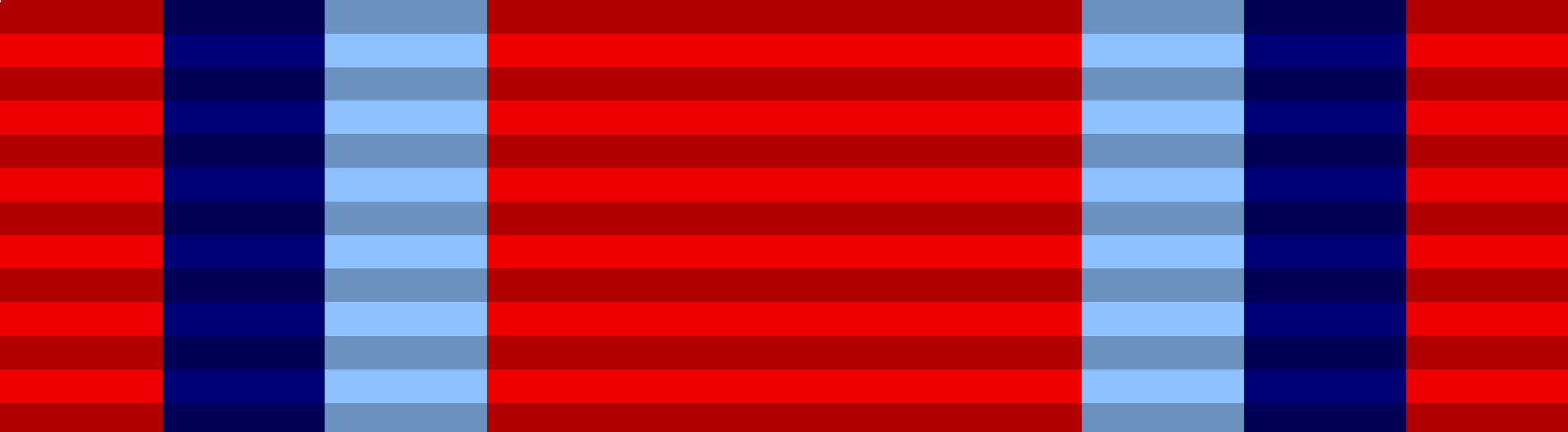
  - Herald of the Most Gallant Order of Military Service (BAT)
