= Border Regiment (Malaysia) =

- Rejimen Sempadan
- Active: 12 January 2008 - present
- Country: Malaysia
- Branch: Malaysian Army
- Type: Line Infantry
- Role: Border Security and Enforcement Infantry
- Size: 11 battalions
- Part of: Malaysian Armed Forces
- Mottos: Setia Waspada (Loyal and Alert)
- Anniversaries: 12 January

The Rejimen Sempadan (English: Border Regiment) of the Malaysian Army was formed with the conversion of the 300-series Regular Force Reserve (Simpanan Angkatan Tetap) of the Rejimen Askar Wataniah (Territorial Army) into the 3rd regiment of the Infantry Corps. Its current strength of 11 infantry battalions being tasked with guarding the national border against all type of incursion, infiltration, smuggling and criminal activities. Currently, it is responsible for the northern border of Peninsular Malaysia with Thailand as well as the border of East Malaysia with Indonesia.

All Border Battalions are subordinated into a Border Brigade with a 30 Brigade HQ reporting to 2 Division HQ and 31st Brigade reporting to 1 Division HQ.

== Battalions ==
The RS has a total of 6 battalions, all of which are standard infantry battalions:

Formation	Headquarters/Locations:
30th Brigade HQ	Bukit Keteri Camp, Kangar, Perlis
1st RS Battalion	Batu Sebelas Camp, Tanah Merah, Kelantan
2nd RS Battalion	Batu Melintang Camp, Jeli, Kelantan
3rd RS Battalion	Pengkalan Hulu Camp, Perak
4th RS Battalion	Grik Camp, Grik, Perak
5th RS Battalion	Bukit Kayu Hitam, Kedah
8th RS Battalion	Shan Shui Camp, Tawau, Sabah
11th RS Battalion	Bera Camp, Pahang
