= Penang and Province Wellesley Volunteer Corps =

- The Badge of Penang Province Wellesley Volunteer Corps
- Active: 1 March 1861–1879; 1889–15 February 1942
- Country: Straits Settlements (now a part of Malaysia)
- Allegiance: British monarchy, allied forces
- Branch: Volunteer Reserves
- Type: Rifle infantry
- Role: Infantry
- Size: 1 battalion
- Part of: Straits Settlements Volunteer Force
- Garrison/HQ: George Town, Penang
- Mascot(s): Scottish highland bull
- Engagements: World War I; 1915 Singapore Mutiny; World War II; Malayan campaign; Battle of Penang (1941); Battle of Singapore

Commanders
- Notable commanders: George Douglas Alexander Fletcher OBE MC

The Penang and Province Wellesley Volunteer Corps (Abbr.: P&PWVC), also known as the Penang Volunteer Corps or Penang Volunteer Rifle, was a militia unit formed in British Malaya. It was officially established on 1 March 1861, making it one of the earliest locally raised volunteer military units in the region.

Together with the Singapore Volunteer Corps and the Malacca Volunteer Corps, the P&PWVC formed part of the Straits Settlements Volunteer Force (SSVF), a volunteer formation within the Crown Colony of the Straits Settlements. Within the SSVF structure, the Penang Volunteer Rifle was designated as the 3rd Battalion, while Singapore comprised the 1st and 2nd Battalions, and Malacca formed the 4th Battalion.

Following the expulsion of Singapore from Malaysia in 1965, the Penang Volunteer Rifle inherited the distinction of being the oldest military unit established in Malaysia.

== History ==
The formation of the Straits Settlements Volunteer Force (SSVF) began in 1854, during the height of the Crimean War, which prompted the British to establish local volunteer militias in their colonial territories. Among the earliest of these was the Singapore Volunteer Rifle Corps, founded in the same year. The movement was mirrored in other British colonies, including the establishment of the Hong Kong Volunteer Corps (now Royal Hong Kong Regiment).

Following its inception in Singapore, the SSVF expanded to other territories within the Straits Settlements, including Penang, Malacca, and Labuan. On 1 March 1861, the Penang and Province Wellesley Volunteer Rifle was officially raised, marking the beginning of locally organised militia forces in northern Malaya.

The Penang unit was disbanded in 1879 but was later revived in 1899 under the new designation Penang and Province Wellesley Volunteer Corps, largely due to the efforts of three prominent Penang residents: Dr. Brown, M.L.C., and Mr. P. Kennedy, then President of the Penang Municipal Commissioners.

In its early years, the Penang Volunteer Rifle, along with other units in the SSVF, operated as a European-only formation, excluding other ethnic groups. This racial policy continued until 1899, when the Penang unit began accepting non-European members, followed by the Singapore units in 1901.

The outbreak of the Second Boer War (1899–1902) further invigorated the volunteer movement across British Malaya. This led to the establishment of the Federated Malay States Volunteer Forces (FMSVF) and the Unfederated Malay States Volunteer Forces (UMSVF). Collectively, these units formed part of the wider Malayan Volunteer Forces, with the SSVF serving as one of its integral components.

The Battle of Singapore in February 1942 marked the final engagement of the SSVF. The force was ultimately overrun and defeated by the Imperial Japanese Army following the fall of Singapore on 15 February 1942.

=== Timeline ===
- 1 March 1861 – The Penang and Province Wellesley Volunteer Rifle (P&PWVR) was established. Only open to European descendant.
- 1879 – P&PWVR was disbanded.
- 1889 (before the Boer War) – P&PWVR was revived as Penang and Province Wellesley Volunteer Corps (P&PWVC). The Headquarters was moved from Kampong Bahru to Northam Road.
- 1889 – Opens its membership to European and Eurasian descent .
- 1910 – Opens its membership to Malay descendant.
- August 1914 – World War I. Immediate and rapid increase in the enrolment of volunteers.
- 1915 – Took part in the suppression of the Sepoy Mutiny.
- November 1933 – The P&PWVC get the first place after won almost all of the categories offered in 1933 Malaya Command Rifle Meeting.
- November 1934 – The P&PWVC placed at the first place back-to-back after won two of four main categories offered in 1934 Malaya Command Rifle Meeting. Others Top 5 teams are: Burma Rifles (Runner-Up), Selangor Battalion FMSVF (2nd Runner-Up), Wiltshire Regiment (4th Place) and Johore Military Forces (5th Place).
- 1936 – The P&PWVC get the first place in 1936 Malaya Command Rifle Meeting. Others Top 5 teams are: Selangor Battalion FMSVF (Runner-Up), Johore Military Forces (2nd Runner-Up), Middlesex Regiment (4th Place) and Malay Regiment (5th Place).
- 1939 – World War II. Increase in the enrolment of volunteers
- December 1941 – Battle of Penang. The battle starts on 9 December 1941 with air battle between Japanese and allied forces over Penang Island. By 13 December, the Governor of the Straits Settlements, Sir Shenton Thomas, ordered the evacuation of the European community on Penang Island to Singapore. On 15 December, most of British and Commonwealth forces withdraw from Penang. By 19 December, Penang completely falls to the Japanese.
- 15 February 1942 – Last stance at Battle of Singapore. All 4 battalions of SSVF including the Penang Volunteer Corps were defeated by the Japanese Forces. Members were taken as Prisoner of war (POW) and were sent to Japanese war prisons throughout the Far East.
- Late 1945 – World War II ends. POW survivors was released in England and later return to their home.

== Organisation ==
The soldiers and officers of Penang and Province Wellesley Volunteer Corps (P&PWVC) were divided by ethnicity. The strength of P&PWVC by the time of WWII was 916 men.

P&PWVC's formations as World War II
Company's Official Name	Ethnic	Company's Type	Notes
H.Q. Company	Mixed	Battalion's Headquarters Company	
A Company	European	Rifle Company	
B (M.G.) Company	European	Machine gun Company	
C (Malay) Company	Malay	Rifle Company	
D (Chinese) Company	Chinese	Rifle Company	
E (Eurasian) Company	Eurasian	Rifle Company	
P.W. Company	Mixed	Public Work Administration Company	
G (Malay) Company	Malay	Rifle Company	
