= Total defence =

Defence policy encompassing military and civilian aspects

Total defence is a defence policy combining and extending the concept of military defence and civil defence. It entails a high level of readiness of both the state and its society to defend itself in cases of dangers and catastrophes such as war, crisis, or natural disasters. Total defence represents all activities preparing the society for war. It implies that in a state of war or emergency, all functions of society, both military and civilian, are included in the defence efforts. This means that in the event of a crisis, all social institutions, such as army, police, parliament, government and its agencies, local authorities, the health system, civil society organizations, entrepreneurs, and individuals would all be mobilized to defend the state.

The implementation of total defence is not globally uniform; instead, the modalities of its application differ from state to state. Differences can be noticed from the implementing elements. Achieving absolute protection of the population is not possible and requires significant resources and costs, for that reason the states make calculations on how to reach the highest possible level of readiness of the population for crisis situations. They usually opt for certain combinations of elements of total defence, which are adapted to their capabilities and level of threat. Particularly important elements are compulsory military service, territorial defence forces, civil defence, economic defence, and psychological defence. Civil defence efforts might include a compulsory fire service, while economic defence preemptively prepares for a war economy by stockpiling strategic reserves. States applying total defence are also more likely to engage in peacetime tripartite compulsory arbitration in order to maintain essential services. Depending on the country's geography, other aspects of total defence could include the establishment of national redoubts and stay-behind forces, training conscripts in free war tactics, and designing civil infrastructure, such as highway strips, to be easily repurposed for military use.

For example, in Finland, the term (Finnish: kokonaismaanpuolustus) encompasses all measures in civil and military sectors that safeguard the livelihoods and security of citizens against external threats, in order to defend Finland's independence. Similarly in Sweden, the term (Swedish: totalförsvaret) means that civil and military defence activities operate jointly, with the aim of protecting and ensuring socially important functions, such as the Swedish Parliament and the Port of Gothenburg.

== List of users ==
Total defence has been adopted by several countries:

- Austria
- Denmark
- Estonia
- Finland
- Indonesia
- Lithuania
- Norway
- Russia
- Singapore
- Sweden
- Serbia
- Switzerland
- Taiwan
- Ukraine

== See also ==
- Total war
- Whole-of-society
