= 23 SAS (Reserve) =

British Army Reserve special forces unit

23 Special Air Service
- Special Air Service Insignia worn by 23 SAS(R)
- Active: 1959–present
- Country: United Kingdom
- Branch: Army Reserve
- Type: Special forces
- Role: Special operations
- Part of: United Kingdom Special Forces
- Garrison/HQ: MOD Kingstanding, Birmingham, West Midlands, United Kingdom
- Engagements: War on terror • War in Afghanistan

23 Special Air Service Regiment (Reserve) (23 SAS(R)) is a British Army Reserve special forces unit that forms part of United Kingdom Special Forces. Together with 21 Special Air Service Regiment (Artists) (Reserve) (21 SAS(R)), it forms the Special Air Service (Reserve) (SAS(R)). Unlike the regular SAS Regiment, it accepts members of the general population without prior military service.

== History ==
The unit was founded during 1959, as an additional regiment of the Territorial Army of the United Kingdom, and was created from the former Reserve Reconnaissance Unit (RRU), this unit having originated from an organisation known as Military Intelligence 9. The initial headquarters location was London, the headquarters were moved during 1959, to Thorpe Street, Birmingham, during 1966, to Kingstanding, Birmingham, within a Territorial Army centre.

In 1985, David Stirling, founder of the SAS, commented "There is one often neglected factor which I would like to emphasize - the importance of the two SAS Territorial regiments. At the start of the Second World War, and during its early stages, it was the ideas and initiatives of these amateur soldiers which led to the creation of at least two units within the Special Forces and gave a particular elan to others. When, however, a specialist unit becomes part of the military establishment, it runs the risk of being stereotyped and conventionalized. Luckily the modern SAS looks safe from this danger; it is constantly experimenting with innovative techniques, many of which stem from its Territorial regiments, drawn as they are from every walk of civilian life."

23 SAS was formed as a result of a direct military requirement of 1 (BR) Corps: because of the RRU's impressive performance during its annual exercise in 1957, when it tested their new techniques in battlefield surveillance and nuclear targeting, 1 (BR) Corps requested the unit to be included in its order of battle. The RRU evolved to become 23 SAS. The role of the SAS in the defence of West Germany was kept top secret but by the 1960s, the KGB and East German intelligence were well aware of what was being planned and even tried, unsuccessfully, to penetrate the unit. 21 and 23 SAS would have been mobilized and deployed to 1 (BR) Corps within 48 hours of an alert. The regiment's first commander was Lt Col H S Gillies; Anthony Hunter-Choat OBE was the commanding officer of the regiment from 1977 to 1983. Peter de la Billiere, who later commanded 22 SAS and then became Director Special Forces, served as the adjutant of 21 for part of this period. He later wrote "People began to see that the Territorial SAS were first class and enhanced the reputation of the whole Regiment in a special way of their own."

In early 2003, a composite squadron of about 60 soldiers of 23 SAS, including soldiers from 21 SAS, were deployed to Afghanistan. There are conflicting accounts on the role of the squadron during this time with Rayment writing in 2003 that it was "long-range reconnaissance" while in 2010 Rayment writes that it was to "establish a communications network across Afghanistan and also acted as liaison teams". Neville writes that they were "instrumental in early efforts to unite various warlord factions" working with the SIS [Secret Intelligence Service] and that they also provided close protection for SIS officers. In June 2008, three soldiers from 23 SAS were killed by a landmine that their Snatch Land Rover triggered in Helmand Province.

On 1 September 2014, 21 and 23 SAS were moved from United Kingdom Special Forces and placed under the command of 1st Intelligence, Surveillance and Reconnaissance Brigade. The units then left that brigade before the end of 2019. Today the two reserve regiments, 21 SAS and 23 SAS are back under the operational command of the Director Special Forces, as an integrated part of United Kingdom Special Forces.

== Organisation ==
The unit structure is as follows:

- 23 SAS(R) RHQ (Birmingham)
  - HQ Squadron (Birmingham)
  - B Squadron (Leeds)
  - D Squadron (Scotland)
  - G Squadron (Manchester)

== Recruitment and training ==
To join, personnel must be aged between 17 years 9 months to 47 years 6 months and phase two trained in another reserve or regular unit. They must first undergo the UKSF briefing course and, if successful, are mobilised to undertake a six month, full time selection course which runs twice a year. Those who pass routinely progress straight onto mission specific training and operations. Applications to join SAS(R) are accepted from men and women, across all three services.
