= Structure of the Malaysian Army =

Organisation of the Malaysia Army

The command structure of the Malaysian Army follows a model typical of modern 21st-century armies. The Army Headquarters serves as the highest authority and houses the senior leadership of the force. Beneath it are four subordinate commands: two responsible for combat operations and two responsible for logistics, training, and doctrine.

== History ==
The Malaysian Army has been strongly influenced by the British Army in its traditions, structures, and uniforms. This is due to its lineage, as the present Malaysian Army is a continuation of the Federation of Malaya Army, which was part of the British Army until the Federation of Malaya (present-day Malaysia) gained independence in 1957. This heritage explains why the Army retains the designation 'Army Headquarters' rather than 'Army Command' for its highest authority.

During the 1970s, Malaysia began to look to other countries to modernise its armed forces. Military delegations were sent to nations including the United States, France, and West Germany (present-day Germany). The exchange of ideas and practices with these countries subsequently influenced the organisational structures adopted by the Malaysian Army.

== Introduction ==
The command structure of the Malaysian Army is hierarchical. At the top is the Army Headquarters (Malay: Markas Tentera Darat), followed by field armies (Pemerintahan Medan), which commands divisions (Divisyen) and brigades (Briged). These formations control large groupings of units. Below them are regiments (Rejimen), battalions (Batalion), and companies (Kompeni), which serve as the middle level of command. At the lowest level are platoons (Platun), troops (Terup or Trup), sections (Seksyen), squads (Skuad), and teams (Tim). Like the British Army, the Malaysian Army also uses terms such as 'squadrons' (Skuadron) and 'batteries' (Bateri), depending on corps (Kor) and regimental traditions.

In the Malaysian Army, a corps is only an administrative and ceremonial organisation. It is not used in the order of battle (AE: combat formations). A corps identifies a soldier's area of speciality and carries its own traditions and uniforms. Examples include the Royal Armoured Corps and the Corps of Royal Electrical and Mechanical Engineers.

Regiments have two different meanings in the Malaysian Army. The first type is similar to a corps and serves mainly as an administrative and ceremonial organisation, such as the Royal Malay Regiment and the Royal Ranger Regiment. The second type refers to combat formations that are part of the order of battle, such as the 2nd Armoured Regiment of the Royal Armoured Corps and the 21st Commando Regiment.

In 1988, as part of the Total Defence strategy, the Army reorganised its reserve components. They are now included in the order of battle and placed under brigade commands.

Besides corps and regiments, the army also has other administrative ceremonial organisations that do not use those titles but maintain their own traditions and uniforms. These include the Gerak Khas (special forces), the Malaysian Army Aviation (aviation arm), and the Territorial Army (reserve component).

Malaysian Army personnel can also be posted to other organisations, such as the Malaysian Armed Forces Headquarters, the Joint Forces Headquarters, the Malaysian Defence Intelligence Organisation, or the United Nations Security Council. When serving in these organisations, they continue to follow army traditions and wear army uniforms. An exception is personnel assigned to the Special Malaysia Disaster Assistance and Rescue Team (SMART), who do not use army traditions or uniforms because SMART is the highest-tier national disaster response unit.

== Army Headquarters ==
Command structure of the Malaysian Army (2022)

The Army Headquarters (Malay: Markas Tentera Darat) is the highest administrative and command authority of the Malaysian Army. It is located at Wisma Kementah within Camp Mindef, Kuala Lumpur. The headquarters is headed by the Chief of Army, who is supported by the Deputy Chief of Army, the Chief of Staff of the Army, and the Regimental Sergeant Major of the Army. In keeping with British Army traditions, the term 'Army Headquarters' is used instead of 'Army Command'. The headquarters is responsible for determining the overall direction, policy, and strategic management of the Malaysian Army.

- Malaysian Army leadership
  - Chief of Army
  - Deputy Chief of Army
  - Chief of Staff of the Army
  - Regimental Sergeant Major of the Army

== Field Army ==
The Malaysian Army organises its combat formations according to the two main geographical regions of the country: East Malaysia and West Malaysia. Each field army command is led by a three-star general. The field army commands are as follows:

- Army Eastern Field Command
  - 1st Infantry Division
  - 5th Infantry Division
- Army Western Field Command
  - 2nd Infantry Division
  - 3rd Infantry Division
  - 4th Infantry Division

=== Army Eastern Field Command ===
The Army Eastern Field Command (Malay: Pemerintahan Medan Timur Tentera Darat) is a field army administrative command responsible for army units garrisoned in East Malaysia. Its headquarters is located at Camp Muara Tuang in Sarawak. The command is led by a three-star general holding the appointment of Commander of Eastern Field Army (Panglima Medan Timur Tentera Darat). Two army divisions are currently placed under this command.

=== Army Western Field Command ===
The Army Western Field Command (Malay: Pemerintahan Medan Barat Tentera Darat) is a field army administrative command responsible for army units garrisoned in West Malaysia. Its headquarters is located at Camp Perdana in Kuala Lumpur. The command is led by a three-star general holding the appointment of Commander of Western Field Army (Panglima Medan Barat Tentera Darat). Three army divisions are currently placed under this command.

== Army Service Support ==
The Malaysian Army has two supporting commands that provide combat service support and military education. Each of these commands is led by a two-star general. The supporting commands are as follows:

- Army Logistics Administration Command
- Army Training and Doctrine Command

=== Army Logistics Administration Command ===
The Army Logistics Administration Command (Malay: Pemerintahan Logistik Tentera Darat) is an administrative command responsible for supply, transportation, service support, and electrical and mechanical engineering support for the Army. Its headquarters is located at Camp Imphal in Kuala Lumpur. The command is led by a two-star general holding the appointment of Commander of Army Logistics (Panglima Logistik Tentera Darat). Most Army personnel serving in the Royal Ordnance Corps, the Royal Logistic Corps, and the Corps of Royal Electrical and Mechanical Engineers are placed under this command.

=== Army Training and Doctrine Command ===
The Army Training and Doctrine Command (Abbr.: MyTRADOC; Malay: Pemerintahan Latihan dan Doktrin Tentera Darat) is an administrative command responsible for training and doctrine in the Army. Its headquarters is located at Camp Segenting in Negeri Sembilan. The command is led by a two-star general holding the appointment of Commander of Army Training and Doctrine (Panglima Latihan Tentera Darat).

A total of sixteen military institutes and training centres, together with all Reserve Officer Training Unit (ROTU) training centres at universities, fall under this command. Although administered by the Army, many of these institutes and centres also accept trainees from other branches of the Malaysian Armed Forces, as well as from government agencies and foreign militaries.

== Independent Army Troops ==
The Independent Army Troops are formations that operate outside the structure of both field armies and support commands. They report directly to the Chief of Army and Army Headquarters and can be deployed to any theatre as directed by the Chief of Army. The current independent formations are as follows:

- 10th Parachute Brigade
- 21st Special Service Group
- 165th Military Intelligence Battalion
- Malaysian Army Aviation

=== 10th Parachute Brigade ===
The 10th Parachute Brigade (Malay: Briged ke-10 Paracut) is an elite formation of the Malaysian Army tasked with conducting special operations and capable of deployment by air, sea, or land. It serves as the Army's primary shock force and is trained in airborne, air assault, and amphibious operations. The brigade can operate independently as special operations-capable unit or be employed in support of special forces, providing a broader strategic advantage during special operations. Commanded by a one-star general, the brigade forms the core of the Rapid Deployment Force.

=== 21st Special Service Group ===
The 21st Special Service Group (Abbr.: 21 SSG; Malay: Gerup ke-21 Gerak Khas or 21 Gerup Gerak Khas) is the special forces command of the Malaysian Army, serving as the administrative headquarters responsible for most Gerak Khas operations and management. It is the largest special forces formation in the Malaysian Armed Forces and comprises three army special forces regiments together with various support units.

Formerly known as the Special Force Headquarters (Markas Gerak Khas), the group is commanded by a two-star general who also serves as the Commander of Army Special Forces (Panglima Gerak Khas). The 21 SSG does not oversee military intelligence-related special forces operations, which fall under a different command structure. In addition, joint special operations involving members of the 21 SSG are directed by the Joint Forces Headquarters rather than the group itself.

=== 165th Military Intelligence Battalion ===
The 165th Military Intelligence Battalion (Abbr.: 165 MIB; Malay: Batalion ke-165 Risik Tentera Darat) is an elite formation of the Malaysian Army that provides advanced surveillance and special reconnaissance capabilities. Originally part of the Royal Intelligence Corps, its personnel were once spread across army divisions. In 2017, the battalion was reorganised as an Independent Army Troop formation reporting directly to the Chief of Army, although it continues to recruit its members from the Royal Intelligence Corps.

The battalion is organised into four specialised teams: the Tactical Surveillance Platoon (Platun Pengawasan Tektikal), the UAV Surveillance and Reconnaissance Team (Tim UAV), the Battlefield Surveillance Radar Team (Tim Radar), and the Security/Counter-intelligence Team (Tim Keselamatan/Risik Balas). It is capable of operating independently as a special operations-capable intelligence unit, supplying real-time intelligence to any army formations at the direction of the Chief of Army. It may also be attached to elite forces of the Malaysian Armed Forces (MAF) to provide dedicated intelligence support during special operations.

The 165th Military Intelligence Battalion is not the only elite intelligence formation linked to the Royal Intelligence Corps. The 91st Intelligence Operations Group (Malay: 91 Gerup Operasi Perisikan), which is under the command of the Malaysian Defence Intelligence Organisation, also conducts specialist intelligence functions within the MAF.

=== Malaysian Army Aviation ===
The Malaysian Army Aviation is the aviation arm of the Malaysian Army, responsible for providing rotary-wing air support to Army formations as directed by the Chief of Army. Formerly known as the Army Air Corps, its headquarters is located at Kluang Airport within Camp Mahkota, Johor. The formation is commanded by a one-star general and currently comprises three flying squadrons, which are designated as regiments in line with Army tradition.

== See also ==
- Structure of the British Army
- Structure of the United States Army
