= 3rd Infantry Division (Malaysia) =

- Divisyen Ke-3 Infantri Malaysia
- Founded: 28 December 1976 (49 years ago)
- Country: Malaysia
- Allegiance: Yang di-Pertuan Agong ('King of Malaysia')
- Branch: Malaysian Army
- Type: Combined arms division
- Size: 4 brigades
- Part of: Army West Field Command
- Headquarters: Terendak Camp, Malacca
- Mottos: Gabungan Penggempur ('Combined Arms') (Malay); Semerah, sehitam ('All red, all black') (Malay)
- Colours: Red and black
- March: Semerah Sehitam Link
- Mascot: Rhinoceros
- Anniversaries: 28 December
- Website: @markas3divisyen (Official social media)

Commanders
- Current commander: Major General Dato’ Indera Zahari Mohd Ariffin

Insignia
- Tactical formation patches

The 3rd Infantry Division (Abbr.: 3 DIV; Malay: Divisyen ke-3 Infantri Malaysia) is a division-sized combined arms formation of the Malaysian Army. Its headquarters are in Terendak Camp, Malacca, and it is in charge of defending the south of the Malay peninsula, which includes Malacca, Negeri Sembilan, Johor, and Pahang.

Major General Dato' Tengku Muhammad Fauzi Tengku Ibrahim is the current commander of 3 DIV.

== History ==
=== Formed as an infantry division ===
Founded as an infantry division on 28 December 1976, during communist insurgency, 3 DIV was tasked with defending the Malay peninsula alongside the 2nd Infantry Division (2 DIV) and 11th Infantry Division (11 DIV). At the time, 2 DIV headquarters were based at Sungai Besi Army Base and were in charge of the Malay peninsula's northern region. The 2 DIV was then relocated to Penang, while the 4th Infantry Division was created for the Malay Peninsula's eastern region. Instead, the 11 DIV was reorganised into an army reserve combat formation. Since then, the 3 DIV has been responsible for four states: Malacca, Negeri Sembilan, Johor, and Pahang.

=== Restructure as a combined arms division ===
When armoured and artillery combat elements were added, 3 DIV was reorganised as a combined arms division. They are the first Malaysian Army's infantry division to do so. Despite the fact that it is no longer a pure infantry division, the 3rd Infantry Division retains its original name.

== Structure ==
3rd Division of the Malaysian Army
Emblem	Name	Formation	Place of deployment
	1st Infantry Brigade	Brigade	Seremban
	4th Mechanised Brigade	Brigade	Kuantan
	7th Infantry Brigade	Brigade	Kluang
	3rd Division Artillery	Division	
	5th Battalion, Royal Malay Regiment (5 RAMD)	Battalion	Kluang
	10th Battalion, Royal Malay Regiment (10 RAMD)	Battalion	Batu Pahat
	14th Battalion (Mechanised), Royal Malay Regiment (14 RAMD (MEK))	Battalion	Gemas
	24th Battalion, Royal Malay Regiment (24 RAMD)	Battalion	Seremban
	2nd Regiment, Royal Armoured Corps (2 KAD)	Regiment	Port Dickson
	11th Regiment, Royal Armoured Corps (11 KAD)	Regiment	Gemas
	1st Squadron, Royal Signals Regiment (1 SSB)	Squadron	Seremban
	3rd Battalion, Royal Signals Regiment (3 RSD)	Battalion	
	2nd Regiment, Royal Artillery Regiment (2 RAD)	Regiment	Johor
	3rd Regiment, Royal Military Police Corps (3 KPTD)	Regiment	Melaka
	508th Regiment, Territorial Army (REJ 508 AW)	Regiment	Seremban
	73rd Workshop, Royal Ordnance Corps (73 WKSP)	Workshop	
	4th Mechanised Brigade Workshop (4 WKSP BGD (MEK))	Workshop	Kuantan
	7th Infantry Brigade Workshop (7 WKSP BGD)	Workshop	
	1st Company (Supply), Royal Logistics Corps (1 KOMP KPD/ PL BEKALAN)	Company	
	7th Company (Supply), Royal Logistics Corps (7 KOMP KPD/ PL BEKALAN)	Company	
