= Malaysian Army Aviation =

- Pasukan Udara Tentera Darat (PUTD)
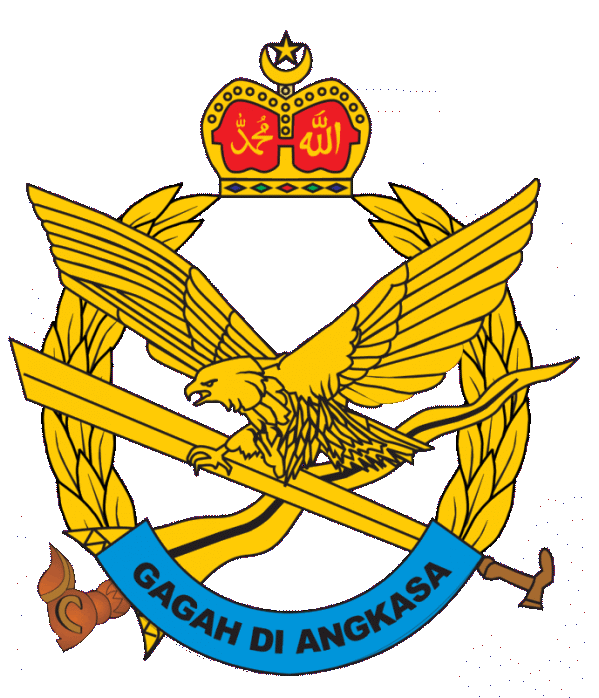
- Malaysian Army Aviation crest
- Country: Malaysia
- Branch: Malaysian Army
- Type: Army aviation
- Role: Aerial warfare Military supply chain management
- Size: 3 squadrons
- Part of: Malaysian Armed Forces
- Garrison/HQ: Kem Mahkota, Kluang, Johor
- Motto: Gagah Di Angkasa

Insignia
- Roundel

The Malaysian Army Aviation (Malay: Pasukan Udara Tentera Darat; PUTD) is the army aviation branch of the Malaysian Army. Currently equipped with helicopters in the liaison, transport and light attack roles. The Malaysian Army also plans to equip PUTD with dedicated attack helicopters in support of Malaysian Army units.

== History ==
The PUTD was formed on 1 July 1994 at the Royal Malaysian Air Force (RMAF) helicopter base in Kluang, Johor. The Army Aviation Project Team was formed to oversee the planning and implementation into the formation of an Army Aviation Wing for the Malaysian Army. At the beginning, six RMAF Officers and six Army Officers were attached to this Pioneer Team to establish PUTD. They are two pilots is Colonel Stephen Ngiau Tai Kong RMAF (Director of the Project Team), Lieutenant Colonel Hj Ibrahim Bin Hj Hashim RMAF, three air force engineering officers named Major Mohd Asri Bin Hamzah RMAF, Major Norazman Bin Saparon RMAF dan Captain Izaidi Bin Musa RMAF and one air force logistics officer is Major Sarudin Bin Chonil RMAF. Whereas another six army officers headed by Lieutenant Colonel Masood Bin Zainal Abidin from RAMD (retired as Deputy Chief of Army with Lieutenant General rank) as Deputy Director, Major Azmi Bin Ariffin from Royal Armoured Corps, Major Idris Bin Mohamad from REMEC, Captain Nazri from KP, Captain Othman Bin Badron from REMEC and Captain Adnan Bin Mat Din from Rejimen Askar Jurutera DiRaja. A combination of expertise from various specialisation that made PUTD where it is today. They are twelve dedicated Officers of Malaysian Armed Forces that become pioneer in this new establishment of the new era of Malaysian Armed Forces with multi-tasking capabilities especially for the Malaysian Army.

PUTD was started flying operations on 11 March 1995, and 881 Squadron as declared operational, with an initial complement of 10 SA316B Alouette III liaison helicopters that were transferred from RMAF. The Kluang Airbase was handed over to PUTD in January 1996. 881 Squadron was declared fully operational on 29 March 1997.

== Roles and responsibilities ==
The roles of PUTD includes the following :

- Provide tactical support to army formations
- Light reconnaissance role
- Operate as part of a combined arms team with other army formations
- Provide limited aerial fire support to army formations
  - Anti armour support to army formations
  - Direct fire support
  - Attack targets of opportunity
- Tactical transport
- Emergency medevac
- Long range observation and scouting
- In theatre search and rescue

== Equipment ==
- Attack helicopters

The Malaysian Army has identified the requirement of an attack helicopter for the PUTD. Several makes have been considered and evaluated, including the Denel Rooivalk, Boeing AH-64 Apache, Agusta A129 Mangusta or TAI/AgustaWestland T129 ATAK and the Eurocopter Tiger. Quantity and variety to purchased unknown. In 2016, six MD530G light attack helicopter ordered.

- Light observation helicopters

PUTD has 11 A109LOH in inventory for light observation duties. One aircraft crashed and written off leaving 10 in inventory. This helicopter can be armed with a 20mm gun and/or rockets for area suppression missions.

- Tactical transport helicopters

This remains a responsibility of the Royal Malaysian Air Force, though it is a logical progression that PUTD will be equipped with light and medium utility helicopters in the future. PUTD acquired 14 Sikorsky S-61A-4 Nuri from Royal Malaysian Air Force as an interim solution before buying the new helicopter. In 2023, Sikorsky S-61A-4 Nuri will be replaced by the new Leonardo AW149.

== Units ==
At the moment, PUTD has three operational squadrons (No. 881 Squadron, No. 882 Squadron and No. 883 Squadron), though more units are planned.

- 881 Squadron

No. 881 Squadron was formed in 1995 with 10 SA.316 Alouette III liaison helicopters transferred from the Royal Malaysian Air Force along with a group of pilots. The unit is commanded by a lieutenant colonel.

In 2006, the squadron was strengthened with the delivery of 11 A109LOH used for light observation duties. Five of the A109LOHs were delivered in December 2005 with the balance of the delivery made during 2006. These helicopters replace the retired SA 316 Alouette III.

The helicopters will be armed with 70-mm. rockets, AIM Twin Missile Pack and 20-mm autocannons.

- 882 Squadron

Transport squadron formed after they received 14 Sikorsky S-61A-4 Nuri medium helicopters from the Royal Malaysian Air Force. The Sikorsky S-61A-4 Nuri will be replaced by the new Leonardo AW149.

- 883 Squadron

The squadron was formed on 11 March 2023. It operates 6 unit MD530G light attack helicopter.

== See also ==
- Royal Malaysian Navy Aviation
