= Royal Intelligence Corps =

- Kor Risik DiRaja
- Kor Risik DiRaja crest
- Active: 7 November 1969 – Present
- Country: Malaysia
- Branch: Malaysian Army
- Role: Military intelligence
- Part of: Malaysian Armed Forces
- Mottos: Pintar dan Cergas; Smart and Active

Commanders
- Colonel In Chief: HRH Sultan Muhammad V, Al-Sultan of Kelantan

Royal Intelligence Corps (Malay: Kor Risik Diraja) is a Malaysian intelligence agency specialising in intelligence gathering, intelligence analysis, psychological warfare (i.e., psy-ops), surveillance, espionage, reconnaissance and counter-intelligence operations. It also manages the propaganda and counter-propaganda effort of the Malaysian Army.

== History ==
Royal Intelligence Corps was formed on 7 November 1969. However, its roots can be traced back to 1953, when Private Hashim Rauf was attached to HQ 355 Field Security Section (FSS) Intelligence Corps (lowed by the attachment in 1955 of other officers and non commissioned officers for the Royal Malay Regiment, the Royal Reconnaissance Regiment and Royal Engineers Regiment to the 355 Field Security Section.

With the independence of Malaya, Malayan members of the Federation Army were transferred back from 355 Field Security Section to form the Federation Field Security Section (FSSS) and combined with the Royal Military Police (FMP), Provost Section and the Special Investigation Section under the Royal Military Police Corps. In 1959, due to the differing roles of the Royal Military Police Corps and the Intelligence Units, the Federation Field Security Section was reconfigured and placed under the General Service Corps (MGSC-Int.).

In 1963, when Malaysia was facing the dual threat of the Insurgency by the Malayan Communist Party the Confrontation with Indonesia, the unit was enlarged and became the Ministry of Defence Intelligence Unit under the Joint Intelligence Directorate at the Ministry of Defence (Malaysia). Intelligence Corps was formally formed on 7 November 1969 by then Malaysia Armed Forces Chief Jeneral Tunku Osman Tunku Mohammad Jewa.

On 7 June 1997, Intelligence Corps was formally bestowed the "Royal" title and became known as Royal Intelligence Corps (Kor Risik Diraja).

== Valour ==
The Royal Intelligence Corps has churned out warriors and heroes who stood firm to the discipline, commitment and dedication to duty and orders given by their superiors. A gallant member of the Combat Intelligence Special Force (Pasukan Khas Perisikan Tempur (PKPT)) was awarded the highest bravery medal of Seri Pahlawan Gagah Perkasa (S.P.). He is Allahyarham Lance Corporal Saimon bin Tarikat who was decorated with the medal after a fierce armed encounter with the communist terrorists (CTs) which took his life in Kampung Pelong Titi, Kuala Kelawang, Jelebu, Negeri Sembilan on January 26, 1983. A handful of officers and men of Royal Intelligence Corps was also awarded with the second-highest gallantry medal of Panglima Gagah Berani (PGB), notably Major Samaon Ahmad, Major Dato' Salehuddin Abdul Muttalib, Warrant Officer 1 Mohamad Baharom, Warrant Officer 2 Jamaluddin Suriani and Corporal Nyopis a/k Nyoeat. Several officers and men were also mentioned in despatches or bestowed with Mentioned-in-Despatches (Kepujian Perutusan Keberanian or K.P.K.).

== Organisation ==
Known units under the Royal Intelligence Corps include the following.

- 165th Army Intelligence Battalion (Batalion 165 Perisikan Tentera Darat)
- 166th Army Intelligence Battalion (Batalion 166 Perisikan Tentera Darat)
- 91st Intelligence Operations Group (91 GOP) (formerly 91 Rejimen Khas Perisikan Tempur (RKPT))
- 92nd Army's Special Branch Battalion (92 Anggota Tentera Cawangan Khas (ATCK))
- 93rd Electronic Warfare Signals Regiment (93 Rejimen Semboyan Peperangan Elektronik (RPSE))

== See also ==
- Malaysian Defence Intelligence Organisation
