= Corps of Royal Electrical and Mechanical Engineers (Malaysia) =

Royal Electrical & Mechanical Engineer Corps
- Kor Jurutera Letrik dan Jentera DiRaja
- Active: 15 July 1957 – present
- Country: Malaysia
- Branch: Malaysian Army
- Type: Maintenance
- Part of: Malaysian Armed Forces

Commanders
- Chairman: Brigadier General Dato' Ts. Muhammad Syafiq Poh bin Abdullah
- Director: Brigadier General Hj Ahmad Jaidi bin Ali
- Colonel-In-chief: HRH Tuanku Muhriz, the Yang di-Pertuan Besar of Negeri Sembilan

Royal Electrical & Mechanical Engineer Corps (Kor Jurutera Letrik dan Jentera DiRaja) is a corps of the Malaysian Army that is responsible for the maintenance of all vehicles, mechanical and electrical equipment of the Malaysian Army, with the exception of heavy equipments of the Rejimen Askar Jurutera DiRaja (Royal Army Engineers Regiment) and signals equipment of the Rejimen Semboyan DiRaja (Royal Signals Regiment).

The lineage of Malaysia Royal Electrical & Mechanical Engineer Corps can be traced to the formation of the British Army Royal Electrical and Mechanical Engineers.

== History ==
Before the outbreak of World War II, various units of the British Army were responsible for the maintenance and repairs of vehicles and equipment of the British Army. The Ordnance Corps took care of weaponry and Logistics, the Royal Engineers maintained engineering plants and machinery, Royal Corps of Signals was responsible for repairs of signals and communications equipment and the Royal Army Service Corps maintained other motor transport of the British Army.

Before 1939, there were two Army Maintenance Workshops in Malaya, one was located at Belakang Mati and the other was located at Changi. Both maintained army equipments and instruments, such as compasses, cameras and such other equipments. The workshops were moved to Alexandra Road, Singapore and the activity of the workshop was enhanced to include repairs on heavier equipment.

In September 1939, another workshop was established in Pulau Pinang, assisted by Indian troopers of the Mobile Workshop Indian Army. A bigger workshop was also established in Kuala Lumpur.

By the time of the return of British Forces to Malaya after World War II, the British Army had already formed the Royal Electrical and Mechanical Engineers (formed in October 1942). When India gained independence in 1947, Indian Army units were withdrawn from Malaya and returned to India. With the outbreak of the Malayan Emergency in 1948, British Forces were stretched. Local Malays were recruited into the British Army to beef up their strength.

The Indian Army's return gave the chance for Malayans to be recruited and trained in REME trades at the REME training Centre at Ayer Rajah, Singapore. They were then assigned as Malayan Other Ranks at the Malayan Workshop in Ipoh, Kluang and Seremban.

In April 1957, the Federation Army Service Corps was formed with the pooling of resources from Medical, Supply, Transport, Logistics and EME units in Malaya. The EME branch of the Federation Army Service Corps undertook maintenance and mechanical and electrical repairs of equipment used by the Federation Army. The EME branch was under the command of the REME Staff Officer I, Lt Kol TFM Moore who was on secondment to the Federation Army. The Malayan Other Ranks were transferred to the Federation Army Service Corps. 6 workshops and 2 Light Aid Detachments was formed.

On 27 May 1958, following the formation of the Malayan Navy and Malayan Air Force, the Services, Ordnance and EME branches of the Federation Army Service Corps were again reorganised and had its name changed to the Armed Forces Maintenance Corps (AFMC).

In 1965, the Armed Forces Maintenance Corps (AFMC) was disbanded and broken up into three separate services. The EME branch was used as the basis for the formation of the Malaysian Electrical and Mechanical Engineers Corps, with Lt. Col. J.R. Dickinson as the first Director. Kor Jurutera Letrik dan Jentera (Electrical And Mechanical Engineers Corps) was officially formed on 9 April 1965. In 1968, Lt. Kol Idrus bin Abdul Rahman was made the first Malaysian director of Kor Jurutera Letrik dan Jentera (previous Directors had been British Army officers on secondment to the Malaysian Army.

On 7 June 1997, the Corps was bestowed the "Royal" title and hence called Kor Jurutera Letrik Dan Jentera DiRaja (KJLJ).

== Organisation and units ==
Jabatanarah JLJ (EME Directorate) at Army headquarters oversees and coordinates activities of Kor Jurutera Letrik dan Jentera.

Kor Jurutera Letrik dan Jentera DiRaja is organised into Base Workshops, while field units include Brigade Support Workshops, Regimental Workshops and Light Aid Detachments.

Kor Jurutera Letrik dan Jentera DiRaja has:

- 2 x Woksyop Pangkalan (Base Workshops)
- 4 x Woksyop Divisyen (Divisional support Workshops)
- 8 x Woksyop Briged (Brigade support Workshops)
- 10 x Woksyop Rejimen (Regimental support Workshop)
- 208 x Detasmen Bantuan Kecil (Light Aid Detachments)
- IJED (Institute of Engineering, Port Dickson)
- SPPTD (Armed Force Apprentice Trade School)
