= General Service Corps (Malaysia) =

- Active: 1 July 1958; 67 years ago
- Country: Malaysia
- Branch: Malaysian Army
- Motto: Berbakti (Devoted)

The General Service Corps was established in 1954 under the name The Federation General Service Corps. Its divisions at that time were the offices of records, payroll, medicine, education and intelligence. The name General Service Corps came into force on 1 July 1958. The medical and intelligence divisions later separated and formed separate corps. This corps is fully responsible for service matters in terms of salary, clerical, education and public relations for the Malaysian Armed Forces. The motto of the General Service Corps is Devoted.
