= National Security Division (Malaysia) =

National Security Division, or Bahagian Keselamatan Negara (BKN), is a senior most grouping within the Malaysian government which meets infrequently. According to a United States diplomatic cable leaked in 2011, BKN is regarded as Malaysia's equivalent to other national security councils. Its main role is to coordinate a broad range of national security issues including natural disaster management, maritime and border control, and cyber security across other government agencies including the Public Order & Security Division, Malaysian Defence Intelligence Organisation, and Malaysian Special Branch.

== History ==
The division was formed on 7 July 1971.
