= Royal Artillery Regiment (Malaysia) =

- Rejimen Artileri Diraja
- Crest of Rejimen Artileri DiRaja
- Active: 15 August 1957–present
- Country: Malaysia
- Branch: Malaysian Army
- Type: Artillery
- Role: Direct / indirect fire support Air defence
- Part of: Malaysian Armed Forces
- Motto: Tangkas Tegas Saksama
- Colors: The guns are regarded as the regimental colours

Commanders
- Colonel-In-chief: HRH Sultan Muhammad V, Al-Sultan of Kelantan

The Rejimen Artileri DiRaja (Royal Artillery Regiment) is the artillery corps of the Malaysian Army. Rejimen Artileri DiRaja was formed in Kajang on 15 August 1957 when a single battery was formed, drawn from Malay personnel formerly serving with the British Army's Royal Regiment of Artillery. Today Rejimen Artileri DiRaja is a modern fighting arm providing direct fire support to Malaysian Army units using field artillery pieces and MLRS.

== History ==
In 1957, an officer from Malaya Command was sent to Singapore to invite Malayan citizens serving with the 1st Singapore Artillery regiment to return home and serve with the Federation Artillery Battery. The drive succeeded in recruiting 89 personnel of 1 Singapore Artillery to return and serve with the Federation Army.

On 15 August 1957, the 1st Field Battery, Federation Army was formed in Kajang with 89 gunners of all ranks, all veterans of the Royal Artillery in Singapore, this date is today marked as its regimental anniversary. The founding battery was equipped with the British 25 pounder field gun and was commanded by Major Sherston Baker, Royal Artillery. Its guns fired the 21 gun salute on Hari Merdeka around half a month later. His successor was Major Rowe and on 1 January 1962 the 1st Regiment Federation Artillery was formed under Lt Col W E Black, its first commander.

== Colonel In Chief And Regimental Motto ==
H.R.H. Tuanku Al-Sultan Muhammad V, the Sultan of Kelantan is the Colonel-In-chief of the Rejimen Artileri DiRaja (Royal Artillery Regiment) since 13 September 2010. He is also the Commander-in-Chief of the Malaysian Armed Forces when he assumed office aa the 15th Yang Di-Pertuan Agong on 13 December 2016.

The regimental Motto is "TANGKAS TEGAS SAKSAMA".

The traditional heraldic emblem of the Malaysian Royal Artillery follows the design of the emblem of the Royal Artillery in the UK.

== Role ==
The main role of Rejimen Artileri DiRaja is to provide direct and indirect artillery fire support in the fields of operations. The modern Rejimen Artileri DiRaja is equipped with a variety of equipment and fulfils a wide range of roles, including observation, Airborne Artillery, Armoured (Mechanised) Artillery, Long Range Missile Systems and Air defence. Regular units of the Rejimen Artileri DiRaja are complemented by members of the Askar Wataniah, which presently provide 5 Artillery Batteries.

== Equipment ==
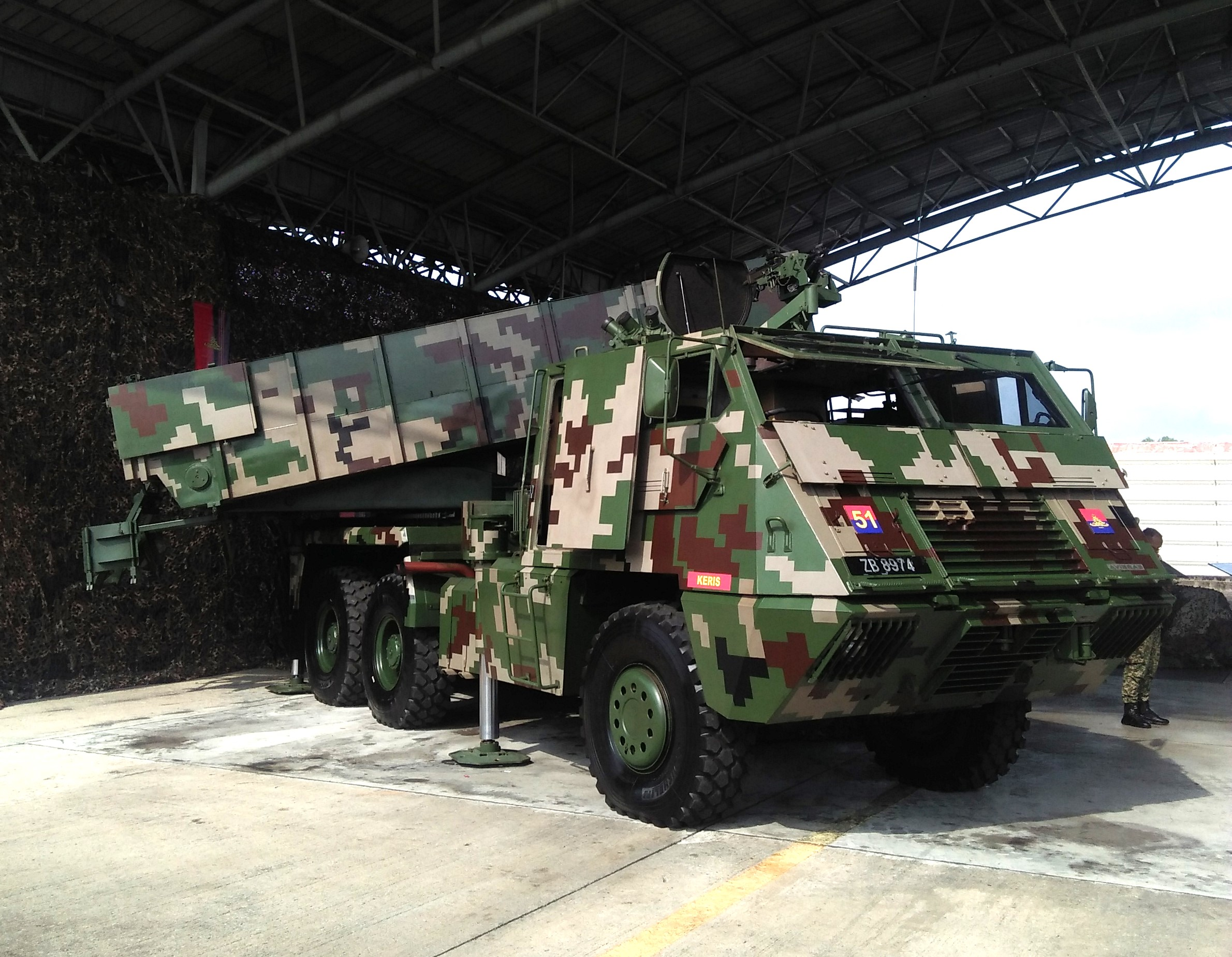
ASTROS-II multiple launch rocket system

The regiment is equipped with Field Artillery pieces, Multiple Launched Rocket Launchers, Anti Aircraft Artillery and Air Defence Missiles. Presently the artillery inventory includes:

- Astros II MLRS
- G5 howitzer
- OTO Melara Mod 56
- M102 howitzer (later use for ceremony)
- GIAT LG1
- Rapier (missile)
- ANZA MK-II missile
- Igla missile
- FN6 missile
- Starstreak missile
- Starburst missile
- Oerlikon 35 mm twin cannon (GDF-005 variant) and 15 FCU Skyguard Radar Systems
- Bofors 40 mm (L70 variant)

=== Field Artillery Regiments ===
Field Artillery Regiments are equipped with 105mm Pack Howitzers which have a range of 10,500 metres.

=== Air Defence Artillery Regiments ===
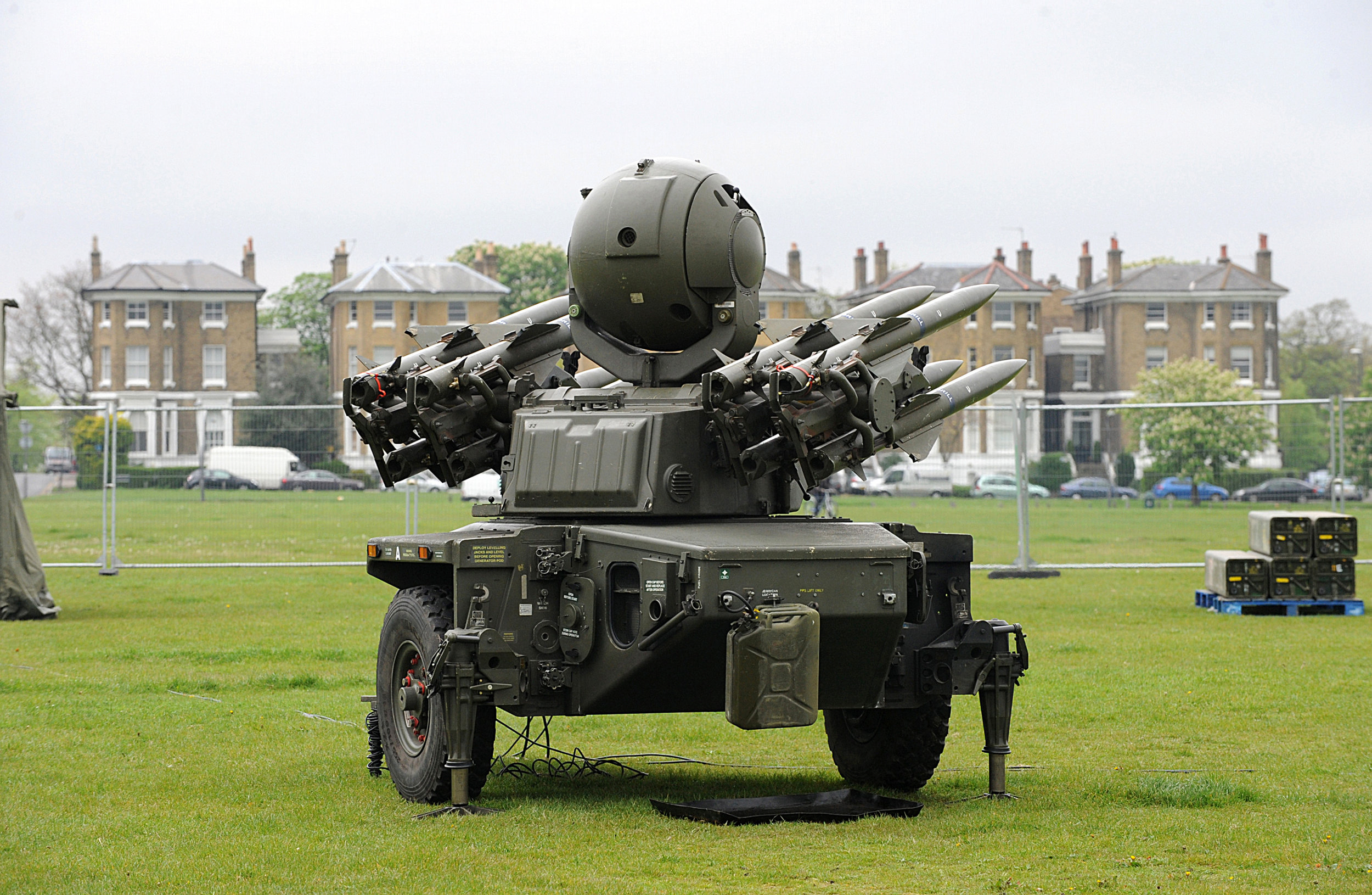
MBDA Rapier SAM

Air Defence Artillery Regiments are equipped with either:

- Radar guided anti-aircraft artillery such as the Oerlikon 35 mm gun system
- Man portable Surface to Air missiles such as the Thales Starstreak, the Anza MK II and the Igla missile systems, with an effective slant range of 5,000 metres.
- The BAe Jernas missile with a reported slant radius of 8,000 metres.

== Guns and Colours ==
The Malaysian Royal Artillery maintains traditions of using Colours and Guns in formal ceremonies, a tradition inherited by the Royal Artillery with later infusions of the traditions of the Honourable Artillery Company.

While the tradition of parading a 25-pounder as Regimental Colour Gun is maintained by the Royal Artillery during the regimental day and Hari Merdeka consistent with the British traditions of the Royal Artillery in the UK, the 1st Artillery Regiment (Parachute), based in Malacca state, is the sole artillery battalion to parade a Regimental Colour in the presence of the Colonel in Chief, HRH the Sultan of Kelantan.

== Units ==
- 1st Regiment Royal Artillery (PARA) based in Terendak, Malacca
- 2nd Regiment Royal Artillery based in Kluang, Johor
- 3rd Regiment Royal Artillery based in Taiping, Perak
- 4th Regiment Royal Artillery based in Segamat, Johor
- 5th Regiment Royal Artillery based in Desa Pahlawan, Ketereh, Kelantan
- 6th Regiment Royal Artillery based in Lok Kawi, Penampang, Sabah
- 7th Regiment Royal Artillery based in Temerloh, Pahang
- 8th Regiment Royal Artillery based in Serian, Sarawak
- 21st Regiment Royal Artillery based in Gemas, Negeri Sembilan
- 22nd Regiment Royal Artillery based in Kota Belud, Sabah
- 23rd Regiment Royal Artillery based in Kamunting, Perak
- 31st Regiment Royal Artillery based in Semenyih, Selangor
- 32nd Regiment Royal Artillery based in Terendak, Malacca
- 33th Regiment Royal Artillery based in Kluang, Johor
- 34th Regiment Royal Artillery based in Gemas, Negeri Sembilan
- 35th Regiment Royal Artillery based in Lok Kawi, Penampang, Sabah
- 361 Battery (361 Bti Parachute) Regiment Royal Artillery based in Terendak, Malacca
- 41st Battery (41 Bti Ceremonial) Royal Artillery Regiment based in Sungai Buloh, Selangor
- 391 Battery (362 Bti Mechanized) Royal Artillery Regiment based in Gemas, Negeri Sembilan
- 51st Regiment Royal Artillery based in Gemas, Negeri Sembilan
- 52nd Regiment Royal Artillery based in Sungai Petani, Kedah
- 61st Regiment Royal Artillery based in Sembrong, Johor
- Royal Artillery Training Centre (PUSARTI); based in Gemas, Negeri Sembilan
