= Malaysian Army =

- Tentera Darat Malaysia تنترا دارت مليسيا
- Crest of the Malaysian Army
- Founded: 1 March 1933; 93 years ago
- Country: Malaysia
- Type: Army
- Role: Land warfare
- Size: 80‚000 active personnel 50,000 reserve personnel
- Part of: Malaysian Armed Forces
- Patron: Yang di-Pertuan Agong
- Mottos: Gagah Setia (Strong and Loyal)
- Colours: Red; Gold
- March: Gagah Setia (Strong and Loyal)
- Anniversaries: 1 March
- Engagements: World War II; 1st Malayan Emergency (1948–1960); Indonesia–Malaysia Confrontation (1962–1966); 2nd Malayan Emergency (1968–1989); Sarawak Communist Insurgency (1962–1990); United Nations Operation in the Congo; Battle of Mogadishu; Kosovo War; United Nations Iran–Iraq Military Observer Group; 2006 East Timorese Crisis; Operation Astute; MALCON–UNIFIL; United Nations Protection Force; ISAF; Cross Border Attacks in Sabah; 2013 Lahad Datu Standoff
- Website: army.mil.my

Commanders
- Supreme Commander: Yang di-Pertuan Agong, Sultan Ibrahim
- Chief of Army: General Dato' Azhan Md Othman
- Deputy Chief of Army: Lieutenant General Dato' Mohamad Suria Mohamad Saad
- Commander of the Western Field Command: Lieutenant General Dato' Khairul Azmizal bin Ahmad Natal
- Commander of the Eastern Field Command: Lieutenant General Datuk Mohd Sofi bin Md Lepi
- Regimental Sergeant Major: Warrant Officer 1 Mohamad Fauzi bin A. Rahman

Insignia
- Flag

The Malaysian Army (Malay: Tentera Darat Malaysia; Jawi: تنترا دارت مليسيا) is the land component of the Malaysian Armed Forces. Steeped in British Army traditions, the Malaysian Army does not carry the title ‘royal’ (diraja) as do the Royal Malaysian Navy and the Royal Malaysian Air Force. Instead, the title is bestowed on selected army corps and regiments who have been accorded the honour by the Yang di-Pertuan Agong ('The King of Malaysia'), who is the Supreme Commander of the Malaysian Armed Forces.

== History ==
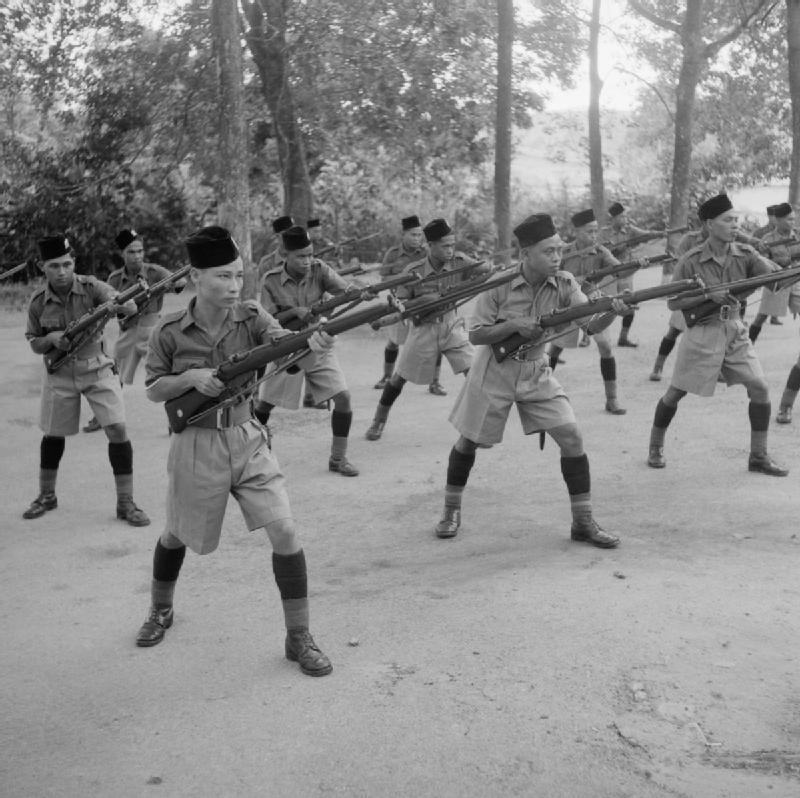
c. October 1941, Malay Regiment soldiers at a bayonet practice before the Battle of Singapore.

The first military units in Malaysia can be traced back to the Penang Volunteer Rifle raised on 1 March 1861 (Note: 1 March is marked as Army Day in honour of the Penang Rifle Volunteers (PRV) raising as the first military unit in the Malay Peninsula.) and the Malay States Volunteer Rifles which existed from 1915 to 1936. The birth of the modern Malaysian Army came about when the Federal Council of the Federated Malay States passed the Malay Regiment Bill on 23 January 1933. This allowed the initial recruitment of 25 males for the First Experimental Malay Company on 1 March 1933 in the Haig Lines camp in Port Dickson, Negeri Sembilan. Major G. McI. S. Bruce of the Lincolnshire Regiment was the first Commanding Officer. By 1 January 1935, the Experimental Company became The Malay Regiment with a complement of 150 men. A battalion was formed on 1 January 1938 and eventually a second battalion on 1 December 1941. The 1st Bn Malay Regiment was famous for its defence of Opium Hill (Bukit Chandu) in Singapore. The ‘Battle of Opium Hill’ on 14 February 1942 involved 42 soldiers commanded by Lt. Adnan Saidi who defended their position against attack from the 18th Division of the Japanese Imperial Army under Lt. Gen. Renya Mutaguchi. After World War II and during the Malayan Emergency, the number of battalions was increased to seven in the early 1950s.

The Kor Armor DiRaja ('Royal Armoured Corps') can trace its roots to the formation on 1 September 1952 of the Federation Reconnaissance Squadron. It was later merged with the Federation Regiment to form the Federation Reconnaissance Corps. The name underwent a few transformations from the Malaysian Reconnaissance Corps (16 September 1967), Royal Malaysian Reconnaissance Corps (May 1979) to Royal Cavalry Corps (December 1979) and finally to Kor Armor Diraja on 8 December 1986. The Royal Ranger Regiment's lineage began in 1863 as the paramilitary Sarawak Rangers. Although the second in the order of precedence, it is the oldest active formation of the Army.

== Profile ==
=== Flag ===
The flag of the Malaysian Army, introduced since the inception of the Malaysian Army and still in use today, combines elements of the Malaysian Flag and the crest of the Malaysian Army. It serves as a symbol of pride and courage for the Malaysian Army.

This flag measures 187 centimetres (74 in) in height and 91.5 centimetres (36.0 in) in width. It is flown from 6.30 am to 6.30 pm daily, following specific protocols and honors.

=== Symbolism ===
- Crown: Represents the loyalty of the Malaysian Army to His Majesty the King of Malaysia and to the Malay State Rulers.
- Crescent Moon and Star: Symbolize the commitment of majority of Malaysian Army members to Islam, the official religion of the Federation.
- The words "Allah" and "Muhammad" symbolize God Almighty and the Messenger of Allah.
- Diamonds: Represent the wealth enjoyed by Malaysians.
- 16 Rice Flower Garlands: Depict the 16 corps within the Malaysian Army.
- Keris Bersilang Duku Ilang: This crossed stand of weapons symbolises bravery and the unwavering commitment of Army soldiers to fight to the last drop of blood. The Keris is a symbol of the fighting peoples of Peninsular Malaysia and a symbol associated with the historic Malay warriors of old, the Duku Ilang a symbol linked to warrior tribes of Malaysian Borneo.

== Organisation and structure ==
Malaysian Army major combat unit locations
Source: Jane's World Armies Issue 23, 2008
New Sabah Times, 2 March 2014
The Borneo Post, 13 February 2016

=== Tactical structure ===
The Malaysian Army currently has 18 Corps and Regiments. These are grouped into 3 main components — the Combat Elements, the Combat Support Elements and the Support Elements.

The Corps and Regiments are currently organised into five divisions. Three of which (the 2nd, 3rd and 4th Divisions) are based on the Malay Peninsula and placed under Western Field Army Headquarters, while the other two (the 1st Division and 5th Division) are based on Malaysian Borneo and placed under Eastern Field Army Headquarters.

The 21st Special Service Group (the Army's special forces), 10th Parachute Brigade and the two Army Aviation Regiments are independent formations.

The Western Field Army Headquarters, Eastern Field Army Headquarters and two support commands (Army Training and Doctrine Headquarters and Army Logistics Administration Headquarters) are placed under Army Headquarters (Army Command).

=== Chief of army ===
The current Chief of Army (Malay: Panglima Tentera Darat — PTD) is General Datuk Azhan Md Othman, who succeeded General Datuk Muhammad Hafizuddeain Jantan since January 1, 2026.

== Rank structure ==
The Malaysian Army uses a rank structure inherited from the British Army. The Malaysian Army rank structure has 17 levels from Private (Prebet) to General (Jeneral). These ranks are divided into 2 main groups — Officer (Pegawai) and Other Ranks (Lain-Lain Pangkat) which includes the Non-Commissioned Officer (Pegawai Tanpa Tauliah — PTT) ranks.

=== Officers ===
Rank group	Commander-in-Chief	General officers				Senior officers			Junior officers			Officer cadets
Rank group	Pemerintah tertinggi	Pegawai tinggi				Pegawai kanan			Pegawai muda			Pegawai kadet
Malaysian Army
Malaysian Army	Fil marsyal	Jeneral	Leftenan jeneral	Mejar jeneral	Brigedier jeneral	Kolonel	Leftenan kolonel	Mejar	Kapten	Leftenan	Leftenan muda

=== Other ranks ===
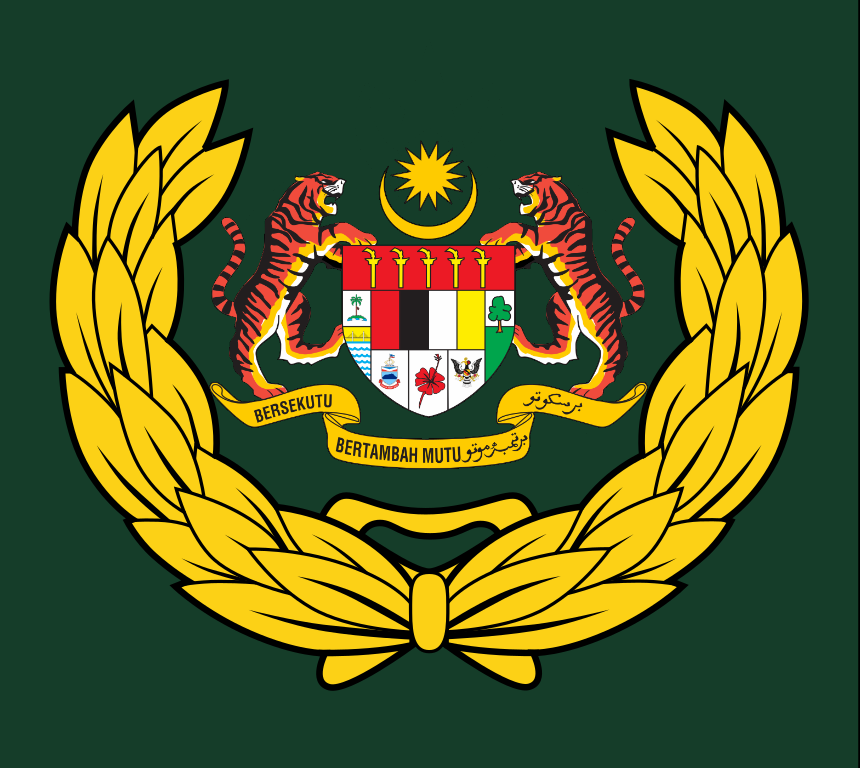
Rank group	Warrant officers		Non-commissioned officers
Rank group	Pegawai waran		Pegawai tanpa tauliah
Malaysian Army							No insignia
Malaysian Army	Pegawai waran I	Pegawai waran II	Staf sarjan	Sarjan	Koperal	Lans koperal	Prebet	Rekrut

== Corps and regiments ==
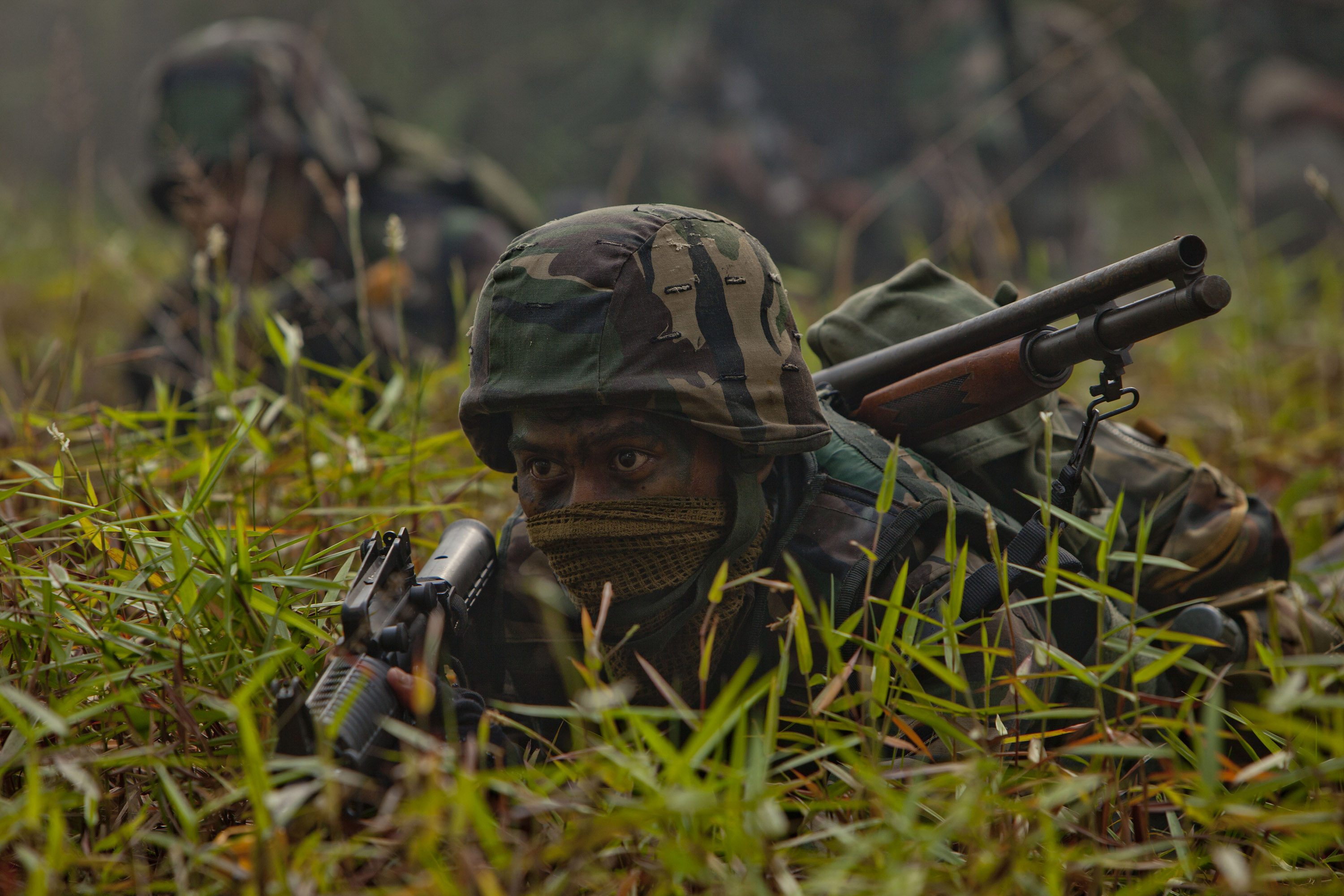
Malaysian soldiers during the Cooperation Afloat Readiness and Training (CARAT) in Malaysia, 2013.

- Rejimen Askar Melayu Diraja ('Royal Malay Regiment')
- Rejimen Renjer Diraja ('Royal Ranger Regiment')
- Rejimen Sempadan ('Border Regiment')
- Kor Armor Diraja ('Royal Armoured Corps')
- Rejimen Artileri Diraja ('Royal Artillery Regiment')
- Rejimen Semboyan Diraja ('Royal Signals Regiment')
- Kor Perkhidmatan Am ('General Service Corps')
- Kor Polis Tentera Diraja ('Royal Military Police Corps')
- Kor Kesihatan Diraja ('Royal Medical Corps')
- Kor Risik Diraja ('Royal Intelligence Corps')
- Kor Perkhidmatan Diraja ('Royal Logistics Corps')
- Kor Ordnans Diraja ('Royal Ordnance Corps')
- Rejimen Askar Jurutera Diraja ('Royal Engineer Regiment')
- Kor Jurutera Letrik dan Jentera Diraja ('Royal Electrical and Mechanical Engineer Corps')
- Kor Agama Angkatan Tentera ('Religious Corps of the Armed Forces of Malaysia')
- Rejimen Askar Wataniah ('Territorial Army Regiment')
- Grup Gerak Khas ('Special Service Group')
- Pasukan Udara Tentera Darat ('Army Air Corps')

=== Combat elements ===
- Rejimen Askar Melayu Diraja

The Rejimen Askar Melayu Diraja ('Royal Malay Regiment') is the most senior regiment of the Malaysian Army. Its ranks are recruited from amongst the Malay population. The Regiment has 27 battalions. The 1st Battalion, the most senior in the Regiment, currently undertakes ceremonial and Royal Guard duties. The remainder are configured as 20 Standard Infantry Battalions, three Mechanised Infantry Battalions and three Parachute Infantry Battalions. The regiment uses rifle green berets except the three airborne battalions that wear maroon berets.

The 19th Bn Royal Malay Regiment (Mech) was involved in the rescue of U.S. 75th Ranger Regiment and Delta Force operatives in Somalia during the Battle of Mogadishu. The unit of 32 Radpanzer Condor APCs and 113 men from MALBATT 1 went in with the U.S. 10th Mountain Division to rescue the trapped Rangers. Four APCs were immobilised and were destroyed by US helicopter gunships. 19 Royal Malay Regiment suffered 1 soldier killed in action (KIA), PFC Mat Aznan Awang while 8 others were wounded in action (WIA). PFC Mat Aznan Awang was later promoted posthumously to Corporal and was awarded with Pingat Seri Pahlawan Gagah Perkasa, the nation's highest gallantry award. In total, 7 officers and 26 NCOs were awarded various medals for their valour during the operation, the highest number of men recommended for medals in a single unit in a single operation.

- Rejimen Renjer Diraja

The Rejimen Renjer Diraja ('Royal Ranger Regiment') is a multi-racial unit organised along similar lines to the Rejimen Askar Melayu Diraja. There are currently 11 battalions within this regiment. The Regiment traces its roots to the Sarawak Rangers and the Sarawak Constabulary, famed jungle trackers who had a deadly reputation during the Malayan Emergency and during the Communist Party of Malaya’s insurgency in Malaysia. The 8th Bn Royal Ranger Regiment (8 Ranger) was the first infantry battalion in the Malaysian Army to undergo conversion into an airborne battalion. The unit is currently assigned to the elite 10th Parachute Brigade. The Malaysian Army's most decorated soldier, WOI (Rtd) Kanang anak Langkau was a Regimental Sergeant Major of 8 Ranger.

- Rejimen Sempadan

The Rejimen Sempadan ('Border Regiment') is a newly created regiment from the 300 series Territorial Army units in charge of the border. The Deputy Prime Minister and Defence Minister, Najib Razak, announced on 1 July 2006 the formation of a new regiment specifically for border patrol. Members of the regiment will be taken from various regiments and corps, most notably from the Rejimen Askar Wataniah. It is believed that the army will form about 2 to 3 brigades of this new regiment. The new regiment was officially raised on 9 February 2008 by Najib Razak at Tanah Merah, Kelantan.

- Kor Armor Diraja

The Kor Armor Diraja ('Royal Armoured Corps') provides the armour capability for the Malaysian Army. Currently, the Corps consists of 5 battalions (sometimes referred to as Regiments), which are equipped with various armoured personnel carriers (AV-8 Gempita, ACV-300 Adnan and K-200 KIFV) and light combat vehicles. Rejimen ke-11 of the Kor Armor Diraja is the sole user of 48 PT-91M Main Battle Tanks from Poland.

=== Combat support elements ===
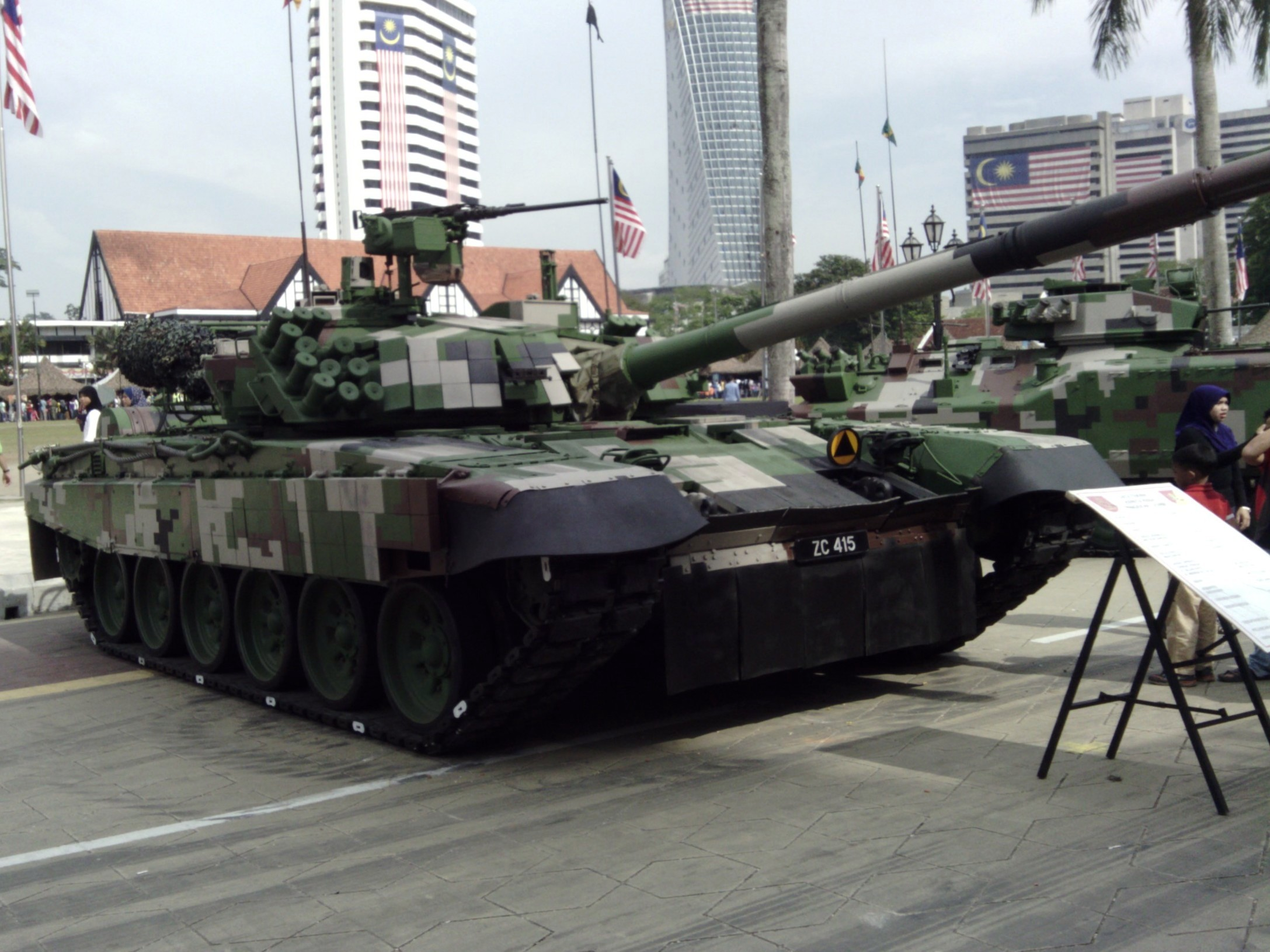
PT-91M Pendekar, main battle tank of Malaysian Army.

- Rejimen Artileri Diraja

The Rejimen Artileri Diraja ('Royal Artillery Regiment') is the artillery corps of the Malaysian Army and provides artillery support and local air defence for army units. The regiment is equipped with 36 Brazilian-made Astros II multiple launch rocket systems (MLRS) and 28 G5 MkIII towed artillery guns from South Africa. Air defence is provided using a mix of Swiss Oerlikon twin 35 mm and Swedish Bofors 40 mm anti-aircraft artillery and missile systems such as the Jernas and Starburst from the UK, Anza from Pakistan, FN-6 from China and Igla from Russia. Malaysia committed to purchase Starstreak V-Shorads missiles from the UK in 2015.

- Rejimen Semboyan Diraja

The Rejimen Semboyan Diraja ('Royal Signals Regiment') is in charge of strategic communication, tactical communications, electronic warfare and early warning systems such as radar.

- Kor Polis Tentera Diraja

The Kor Polis Tentera Diraja ('Royal Military Police Corps') deploys as part of the field army, in support of army operations and enforces proper conduct among army personnel. Aside from being responsible for base security, the military police are also tasked with preventing and investigating criminal activities on army property or by military personnel.

- Rejimen Askar Jurutera Diraja

The Rejimen Askar Jurutera Diraja ('Royal Engineers Regiment') is tasked with demolitions, bridge-laying and the repair of military infrastructure, such as airbase runways or clearing obstacles in emergency situations.

- Kor Jurutera Letrik dan Jentera Diraja

The Kor Jurutera Letrik dan Jentera Diraja ('Royal Electrical and Mechanical Engineers Corps') is responsible for the maintenance of all vehicles and machinery of the Malaysian Army.

- Kor Risik Diraja

The Kor Risik Diraja ('Royal Intelligence Corps') specialises in psychological warfare (psyops), surveillance, intelligence, reconnaissance and counter-intelligence operations. Aside from handling propaganda and counter-propaganda, the corps is also tasked with conducting background checks on recruits when they first enroll in any training courses. There are two Army combat elements attached to the Kor Risik Diraja.

=== Services support elements ===
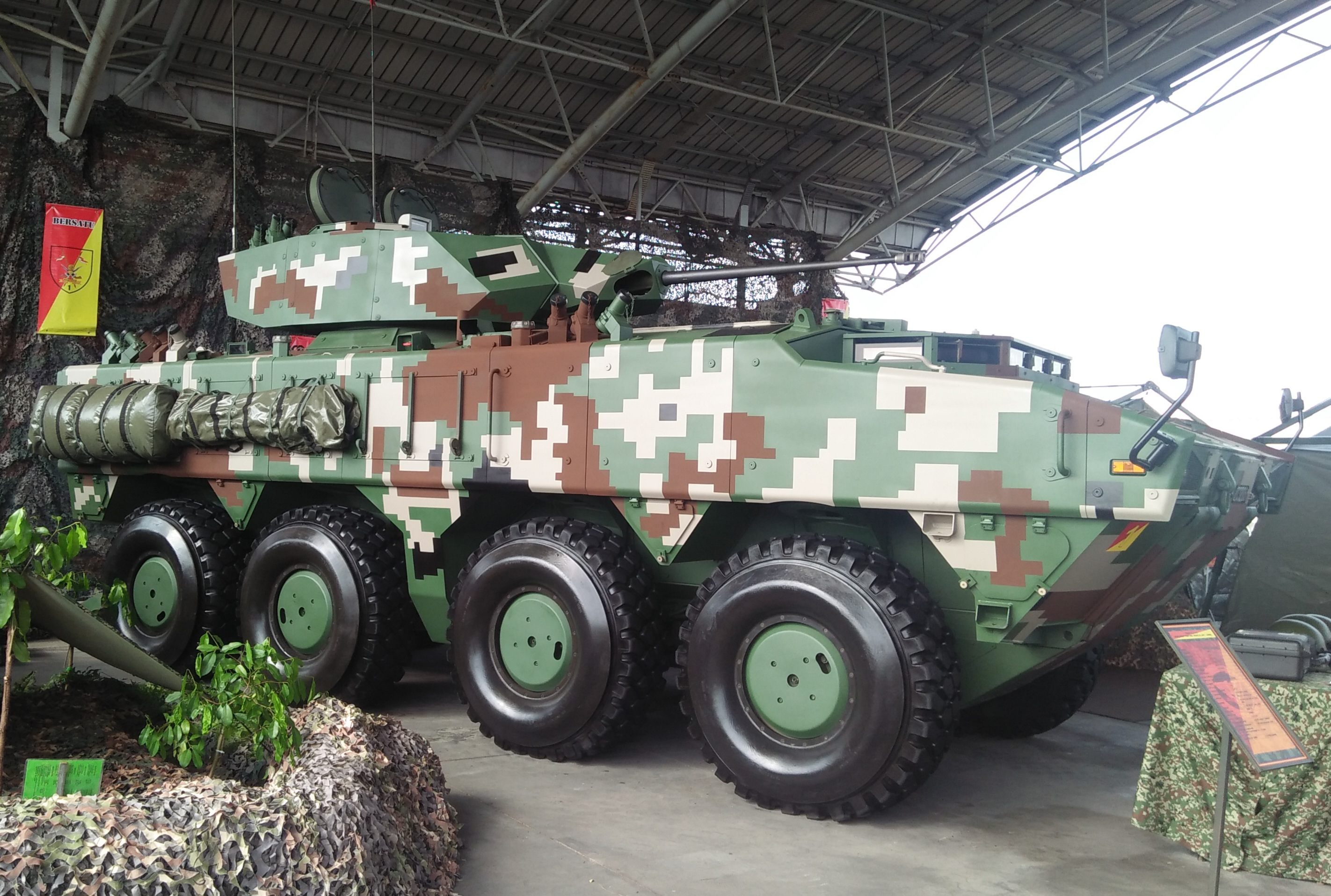
AV8 Gempita infantry fighting vehicle on display.

- Kor Ordnans Diraja

The Kor Ordnans Diraja ('Royal Ordnance Corps') ensures that all military supplies and ordnance are stored, secured and inventoried properly.

- Kor Agama Angkatan Tentera

The Kor Agama Angkatan Tentera (KAGAT; 'Armed Forces Religious Corps') performs religious (chaplainry) services for Muslim, Christian and, other religions in the Malaysian Armed Forces. It also provides counselling and conducts ritual prayers on the battlefield.

- Kor Perkhidmatan Diraja

The Kor Perkhidmatan Diraja ('Royal Logistics Corps') is in charge of transporting troops and supplies to the various units of the Malaysian Army.

- Kor Kesihatan Diraja

The Kor Kesihatan Diraja ('Royal Medical Corps') provides training for Army medics and other specialists. It runs the Armed Forces hospitals and provides the battlefield mobile hospitals. The unit has also provided relief MALMEDTIMs (Malaysian Medical Teams) to Pakistan, Afghanistan, Western Sahara, Indonesia and Palestine.

- Kor Perkhidmatan Am

The Kor Perkhidmatan Am ('General Service Corps') handles administration, educational matters, public relations and financial management for the entire armed forces.

=== Elite forces ===
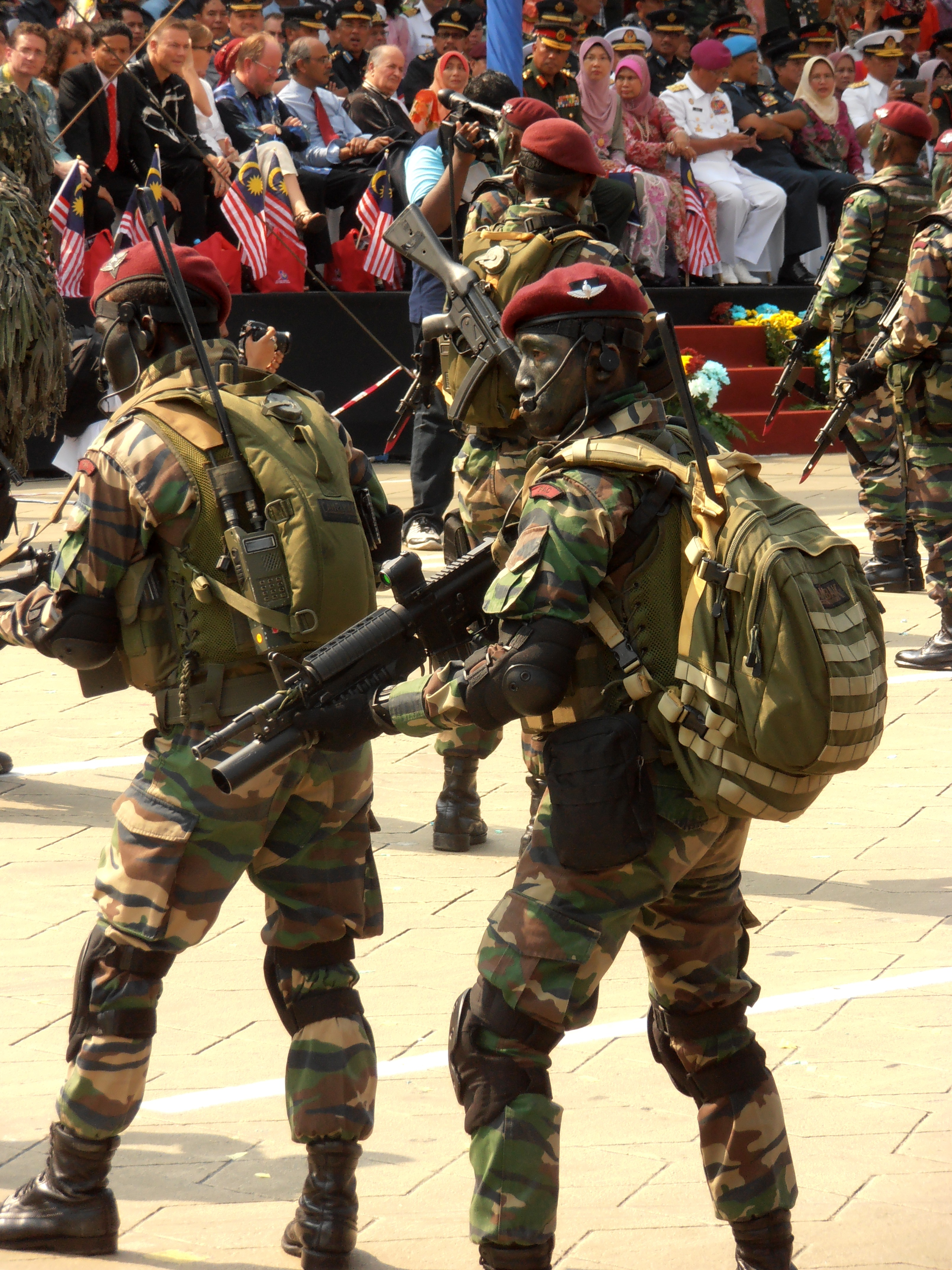
Paratroopers from 10th Para Brigade in demonstration for the 56th Merdeka Day parade.

- 21 Grup Gerak Khas

The 21 Grup Gerak Khas (21 GGK; '21st Special Service Group') is the Malaysian Army's special forces and commando unit. 21 GGK is one of the two Elite forces in the Malaysian Army. 21 GGK is the operational home of various specialists and the Commando regiments, which are capable of conducting unconventional warfare or special operations. One of the known foreign operations involving this regiment was in an attack by Somali militia on a convoy transporting UN Intelligence Chief in UNOSOM II on 18 July 1994. In the action, two members of the regiment were killed in action, while another four were wounded. One of the injured men was taken hostage by the militia and was released nine hours later.

- 10th Parachute Brigade

The 10th Parachute Brigade (10 Para Bde; Malay: 10 Briged Payung Terjun — 10 Bgd Para) is an elite airborne unit tasked with being rapidly deployed inside or outside the boundaries of Malaysia. 10 Para is the key element of the Malaysian Rapid Deployment Force (Malay: Pasukan Aturgerak Cepat — PAC) and it is Malaysia primary main offensive force in time of war or emergencies.

=== Army air corps ===
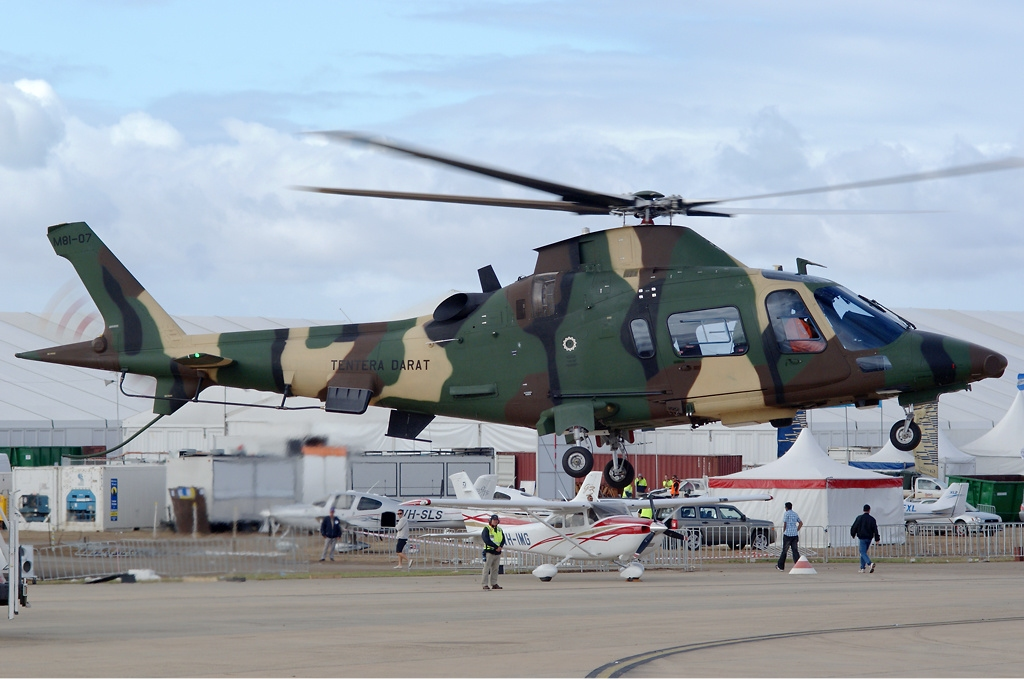
Malaysian Army AW109, armed with 20mm gun and rockets for area suppression.

- Pasukan Udara Tentera Darat

The Pasukan Udara Tentera Darat ('Army Air Corps') is the army aviation branch formed around a core of Royal Malaysian Air Force officers. This new Army formation is tasked with liaison duties, providing limited transport capabilities, close air support and also air reconnaissance using light observation helicopters. The unit currently has three squadron, 881 Army Aviation Regiment, 882 Army Aviation Regiment and 883 Army Aviation Regiment. The main Army Air Corps base is located in Kluang, Johor. As 2019, the Air Corps is equipped with 10 Agusta A109LOH light helicopters and 14 Sikorsky S61A-4 medium helicopter. The 882 Army Aviation Regiment will be received new Leonardo AW149 to replaced its aeging Sikorsky S61A-4 while the 883 Army Aviation Regiment has received 6 units of MD530G light attack helicopter in 2022.

=== Reserves unit ===
- Rejimen Askar Wataniah

The Rejimen Askar Wataniah ('Territorial Army Regiment') forms the second line of Malaysia's defence. Formed by college students, professionals and civilians, it provides support for the regular armed forces of Malaysia and is responsible for the security of key installations in times of conflict. Originally tasked with area and local defence, the Rejimen Askar Wataniah units have been reconfigured and will perform front line duties alongside regular units when the need arises. Rejimen Askar Wataniah units, such as armoured squadrons, are integral units of several Kor Armor Diraja regiments.

=== Rapid reaction infantry battalion ===
- Batalion Siap Sedia Tentera Darat

The Batalion Siap Sedia Tentera Darat (BSSTD; 'Army Rapid Battalion — ARB') is a combat ready battalion of the Malaysian Army. The ARB can be deployed to overseas conflict areas in short notice under order of the United Nations Department of Peacekeeping Operations (UN DPKO). The battalion consists of multiple capabilities, including special operations, armour, infantry and Chemical, biological, radiological and nuclear defence (CBRN defence). Currently, the 7th Battalion, Royal Ranger Regiment (Mechanised) (7 RRD (Mek)) is assigned as the main combat element for the ARB. The 7 RRD (Mek) is supported by various corps and regiments, including special ops operators from the Malaysian Army counter-terrorism regiment, the 11th Special Service Regiment.

== Strength ==
The personnel strength of the Malaysian Army is approximately 80,000 personnel in the Active Army, 50,000 in the Active Reserve and 26,600 active and 244,700 reservists in the paramilitary.

The Malaysian Army consists of 5 infantry divisions, 11 infantry brigades, 1 mechanised brigade, 3 border brigades, 1 special forces brigade and 1 airborne brigade composed of:

- 30 light infantry battalions
- 4 airborne infantry (paratrooper) battalions
- 4 mechanised infantry battalions
- 5 armoured battalions (1 tank regiment)
- 1 light tank squadron
- 14 artillery regiments (4 air defence)
- 3 special forces regiments
- 3 field engineer regiments
- 1 construction engineer regiment
- 1 airborne infantry squadron
- 4 military police regiments
- 1 signals regiment
- 1 intelligence unit
- 3 helicopter squadrons

The territorial army includes:

- 16 light infantry regiments
- 4 specialist engineer regiments

== Present development ==
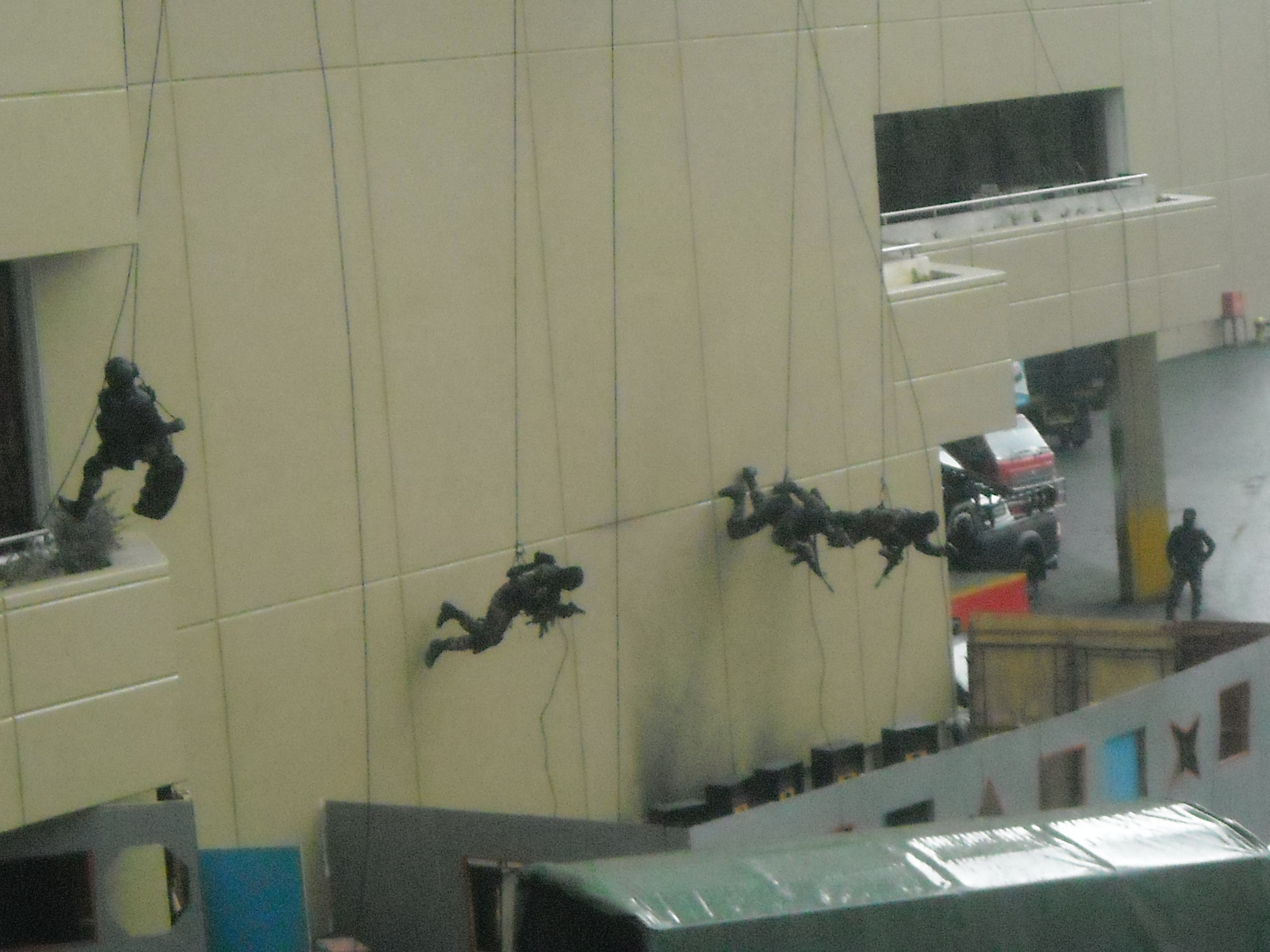
Troopers of GGK using rappels during a counter-terrorism demonstration.

Since the recovery from the 1997 economic crisis, Malaysian Army along with other branches of the Malaysian Armed Forces has regained momentum in its modernising programs.

=== Firearms ===
Currently, the American-made M4 carbine is standard issue for all army units while the Steyr AUG is only in limited use by certain units and the former standard issue M16A1 rifle is only use for ceremonial purposes and by Rejimen Askar Wataniah. Both the M4 carbine and the Steyr AUG are locally produced by SME Ordnance although the Steyr AUG rifle is no longer in production. In conjunction of LIMA 2023, United Arab Emirates EDGE Group had signed an agreement with Malaysian company Ketech Asia for the production of CARACAL firearms locally through the transfer of technology.

=== Tanks ===
The first major procurement was to set a milestone by building its first ever main battle tank regiment. Malaysian Army received delivery of 48 units PT-91M Pendekar main battle tanks and other tank-based equipment like ARV WZT-4 from Poland with fully completed contract of sale in March 2010. As of 2024, the army is planning to upgrade all PT-91M Pendekar tanks with the planned SLEP program. In 2016, a Malaysian company Etika Strategi Sdn Bhd made an agreement with Rheinmetall and Otokar on the possibility of working together on the Turkish joint venture Altay MBT.

=== Armoured combat vehicles ===
Malaysian Army is also rapidly mechanising its current inventory - 267 units locally manufactured DefTech ACV-300 Adnan IFVs were acquired by the army in 2004 and 111 units K200 KIFV also purchased from South Korea. Following the procurement of the Pakistani Bakhtar-Shikan ATGM, they were installed on the ACV-300 Adnans. As of 2023, the army will be modernising 60 ACV-300 Adnans in a Service Life Extension Program (SLEP). The army planned the SLEP for the entire ACV-300 Adnan and K200 KIFV fleet. The AV4 Lipanbara MRAPs were also manufactured by DefTech for the army and are stationed in East Malaysia ESSCOM area of operations. In 2014, the army also procured the locally produced DefTech AV8 Gempita which is based on the Turkish FNSS Pars and manufactured with FNSS Defence Systems assistance. A Malaysian company AVP Engineering has teamed up with a South Korean defence company Doosan DST to offer Black Fox 6x6 wheeled armoured vehicle if it was selected by the Malaysian government. In 2017, Malaysian Army acquired IAG Guardian armoured vehicle for uses in peacekeeping missions in Lebanon. Malaysian Army planned to add locally made light armoured vehicle in their inventory. In 2019, Malaysian government issues a tender for the new multipurpose light armoured vehicle. The variants sought for this new vehicle is the fitted for radio, mortar carrier, anti-tank guided missile carrier, light assault vehicle and special operation vehicle. This new light armoured vehicle is uses to augment the fleets of URO VAMTAC and locally made Weststar GK-M1/M2. In August 2020, the Ministry of Defence is preparing for an open competition to find the replacement for the armoured vehicle to replace the Condor APC and SIBMAS IFV. About 250-400 Armoured Fighting Vehicle were requested by the army, specifically in 4x4 and 6x6 configurations. As of 2024, the army has put in an order for 136 vehicles of the new Mildef Tarantula HMAV and more than 200 vehicles of the Cendana Auto 4x4 have also been delivered to the army since 2021. In Defence Services Asia (DSA) 2022 exhibition, Mildef International Technologies has launched its second armoured vehicle called Mildef Rentaka and offered it for Malaysian Army armoured vehicle program. In same exhibition also, Malaysia signed a contract to purchase Ejder Yalcin for Malaysian Army to be use by the UNIFIL contingent. Mildef also has offered its Mildef Ribat HMLTV for Malaysian Army High Mobility Light Tactical Vehicle Program.

=== Artillery ===
Despite adding some 28 units of South African G5 Mk III 155 mm howitzers, another major procurement was 18 units of Astros MLRS from Brazil, which delivery was completed in 2006. A second batch of 18 units MRLS was ordered in 2007. The United States reportedly agreed to transfer a total of 29 pieces of M109 howitzer artillery to the Malaysian Army but this deal was cancelled at the last minute. In 2018, Malaysian Army ordered 18 units of Nexter LG1 Mk III 105 mm howitzers. It is reported that in October 2024, Malaysian Army has selected the EVA M2 155 mm SPH as future self-propelled howitzer.

=== Air defence ===
There is also a requirement for an upgrade to the current air defence network. However, a dispute between the army and the air force on whether to introduce a mid-range surface-to-air missile system had led to the procurement being put on hold. According to a recent interview of the army's chief of staff, Ismail bin Haji Jamaluddin, the army has no intention of taking over the mid-range air defence role. Malaysian defence company, Weststar Defence Industries and its subsidiary Global Komited, has partnered with British air defence company, Thales for the distribution of Starstreak surface-to-air missile to the Malaysian Army.

=== Aircraft ===
Malaysian Army is now shifting its emphasis on enhancing its air wing. In September 2006, Malaysian Army received its 11th and last Agusta Westland AW109. These helicopters are to initially complement, and ultimately replace, the ageing SA316B Aérospatiale Alouette III helicopters. Some of them were to be installed with light arms and to be tasked to a scout observation unit. Furthermore, the army will also receive S61A-4 Nuri multipurpose helicopters after they are retired from RMAF and these will form the backbone of the army's very first air transport units - 881 and 882 squadrons of the army air wing. To boost the security in eastern Sabah from the attacks by militants in the southern Philippines, especially in the Sulu Sea, the Malaysian government has purchased a total of six McDonnell Douglas MD-530G light attack helicopters from the United States for the Malaysian Army. In 2023, the army acquired Sikorsky UH-60 Black Hawk helicopter as the replacement for the S61A-4 Nuri. Due to delay in contract, there is planned to scrapped the Sikorsky UH-60 Black Hawk acquisition and replaced it with AgustaWestland AW149.

=== Future soldier system and network centric operation system ===
The Malaysian Army currently has a soldier modernisation programme called the Future Soldier System (FSS). Under the FSS, The Malaysian Army plans to equip all soldiers with Personal Protection Equipment (PPE) such as Kevlar helmets, Kevlar vests, Oakley goggles and ear protection equipment. The programme also includes arming all the standard issue M4 carbines with SOPMOD kits, as well as equipping soldiers with a Glock series pistol. Sapura, a Malaysian electronics company, is offering their SAKTI Soldier System concept via work in three areas: Head Sub-System (HSS), Body Sub-System (BSS) and Weapon Sub-System (WSS). The HSS consists of a Helmet–Mounted Micro Camera and night vision capability with a data output, helmet-mounted display and earpiece and microphone. The BSS consists of a controller system, energy unit with a power pack for the communication interface, micro-camera and HMD with a single polymer lithium-ion battery for up to ten hours of operation; a communications interface for secure IP-based radio which from the image is a Thales St@rmille radio and finally a navigation unit with a display for blue force tracking and situational awareness, colour digital mapping and terrain and urban profile analysis. The system displayed is visually similar to the Kord Defence SmartGrip RIC developed in partnership with Thales Australia. The WSS consists of a Rifle Control Unit consisting of a five-button wireless controller for one handed use with key features including push to talk for the radio, switching the HMD on and off, turning the HMD brightness up and down as well as video transmission to friendly forces.

The FSS in conjunction with the Network Centric Operation (NCO) System, will give the three branches of the Armed Forces a shared situational awareness, interoperability and a common operating picture via a X-band satellite-based link and an unmanned aerial vehicle (UAV) system, with hopes to enable self-synchronisation for all three branches. The programme will go through several phases, with Phase 1A (the implementation of the mobile X-band satellite communication linked) and Phase 2 (the demonstration of the capabilities of the FSS with NCO) being successful and operational in 2017. In 2018, during the annual DSA convention, the Malaysian Army showcased a joint exercise between the NCO systems via Army Operations Room and soldiers equipped with FSS systems, where the Army Operations Room coordinated the soldiers doing numerous activities, first being a live firing of a 3-man squad involving the usage of artillery and how precise the accuracy of the artilleries via the FSS and NCO equipment, second being in an Army Training Centre and last being a real simulation operation in East Malaysia. Currently, several combat elements such as the 12th Royal Malay Regiment and the 4th Mechanised Brigade are outfitted with the system. Through the use of this system, the Malaysian Army is able to operate anywhere throughout the world, especially during United Nations Operations.

== See also ==
- Malaysian Armed Forces
  - Royal Malaysian Navy
  - Royal Malaysian Air Force
- Malaysia Coast Guard
- Royal Malaysia Police
- Royal Johor Military Force
- Joint Forces Command
