= Malaysian Defence Intelligence Organisation =

Malaysian intelligence agency

- Pertubuhan Perisikan Pertahanan Malaysia
- Malaysian Armed Forces badge
- Active: 1 October 1981 – Present
- Country: Malaysia
- Role: Military intelligence
- Size: Classified
- Part of: Malaysian Armed Forces

Commanders
- Colonel In Chief: HRH Sultan Muhammad V, Al-Sultan of Kelantan

The Malaysian Defence Intelligence Organisation (MDIO) (Malay: Pertubuhan Perisikan Pertahanan Malaysia, Jawi: ڤرتوبوهن ڤريسيكن ڤرتاهنن مليسيا) is the military intelligence agency of the Malaysia Armed Forces. Its role is said to be equivalent to the US Defense Intelligence Agency.

MDIO is headed by an army lieutenant general and consists of tri services military branch such as army intelligence, naval intelligence and air force intelligence.

== History ==
The MDIO, formerly known as Defense Intelligence Staff Division (DISD), was established on 1 October 1981 to replace the Joint Intelligence Directorate (JID). Its main objective was to gather and produce intelligence products to counter the Communist Party of Malaya (CPM) during the Second Malayan Emergency.

On 23 September 2022, Chief of Defence Forces General Affendi Buang officially changed the name and logo of the Armed Forces Defence Intelligence Staff Division (DISD) to the Malaysian Defence Intelligence Organisation.

From December 2023, Lieutenant-General Datuk Ahmad Norihan Jalal is retiring and his position has been handed over to his deputy and successor, Lieutenant-General Dato’ Mohd Razali Alias. Congratulations are also extended to Lieutenant-General Dato’ Mohd Razali Alias on his appointment as the 18th Director-General of Malaysian Defence Intelligence Organisation (MDIO).

In August 2025, five officers of the MDIO were arrested for leaking intelligence to a smuggling ring in return for money.

== Organisation ==
The DIO's headquarters is located in Kuala Lumpur. It is responsible for the overall management and administration of the organization. The Director General of MDIO is responsible for reporting to the Chief of Armed Forces, the Minister of Defence, and the National Security Division.

== See also ==
- Royal Intelligence Corps
