= Royal Military Police Corps (Malaysia) =

- Kor Polis Tentera DiRaja
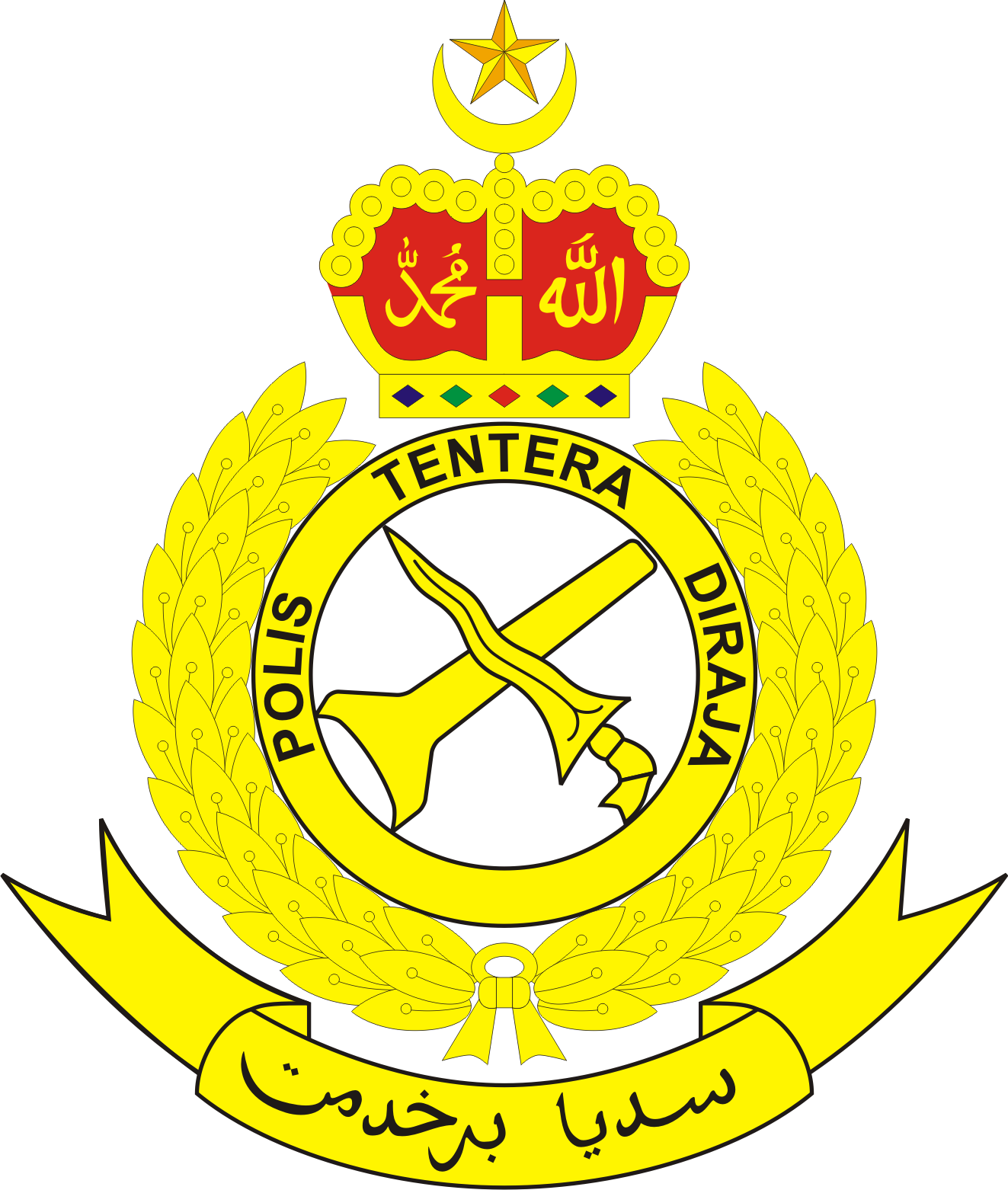
- Kor Polis Tentera DiRaja cap badge
- Active: 12 November 1953; 71 years ago
- Country: Malaysia
- Branch: Malaysian Army
- Type: Military Police
- Part of: Malaysian Armed Forces
- Garrison/HQ: Fort Imphal, Kuala Lumpur
- Nickname(s): Wira Merah; Red Warrior
- Motto(s): Sedia Berkhidmat; Ready to serve
- Beret: Red

Commanders
- Chairman of Royal Military Police Corps: Brigadier General Datuk Mislan Bin Anuar

The Royal Military Police Corps (Standard Malay: Kor Polis Tentera DiRaja) is the military police branch of the Malaysian Army. Referred to as the "Redcaps" like their British counterpart or, more popularly, known as "MPs", the Kor Polis Tentera DiRaja keep discipline within the Army ranks and ensure security at Malaysian Army installations.

== History ==
At the end of World War II, Malaya was in a precarious situation. The civil police was in tatters and the two battalions of the Malay Regiment has been disbanded by the Japanese when Singapore fell in 1942 and not to be reformed until 1948. When British sent Forces to Malaya at the end of World War II, Military Police units of the Indian Army played a major role in assisting the civil authorities enforcing peace and order in Malaya.

On 4 December 1950, during the early years of the Malayan Emergency, 9 Malay Regiment soldiers were chosen to form Malay Regiment Military Police Section and perform Provost duties within the regiment. They were stationed at Kem Segenting at Port Dickson.

On 12 November 1953, the Malay Regiment Military Police (enlarged from the previously one section strength) was transferred to the British Royal Military Police administration and transferred to Taiping, Perak, and the Military Police Company was formed, under the command of Captain Thomas Michael Dillon-White. Apart from performing provost duties, the Military Police Company assisted civil authorities in keeping public order.

The Military Police Company moved to Kuala Lumpur on 29 March 1957 and underwent a name change to the Federation Military Police. And in July 1957, the company was moved to Fort Imphal in Kuala Lumpur. With the formation of Malaysia, the unit was called the Malaysian Military Police Corps. The corps was bestowed the royal "DiRaja" title on 7 June 1997, by Tuanku Jaafar Tunku Abdul Rahman, then Yang di-Pertuan Agong, henceforth bearing the DiRaja title in its name.

== Role ==
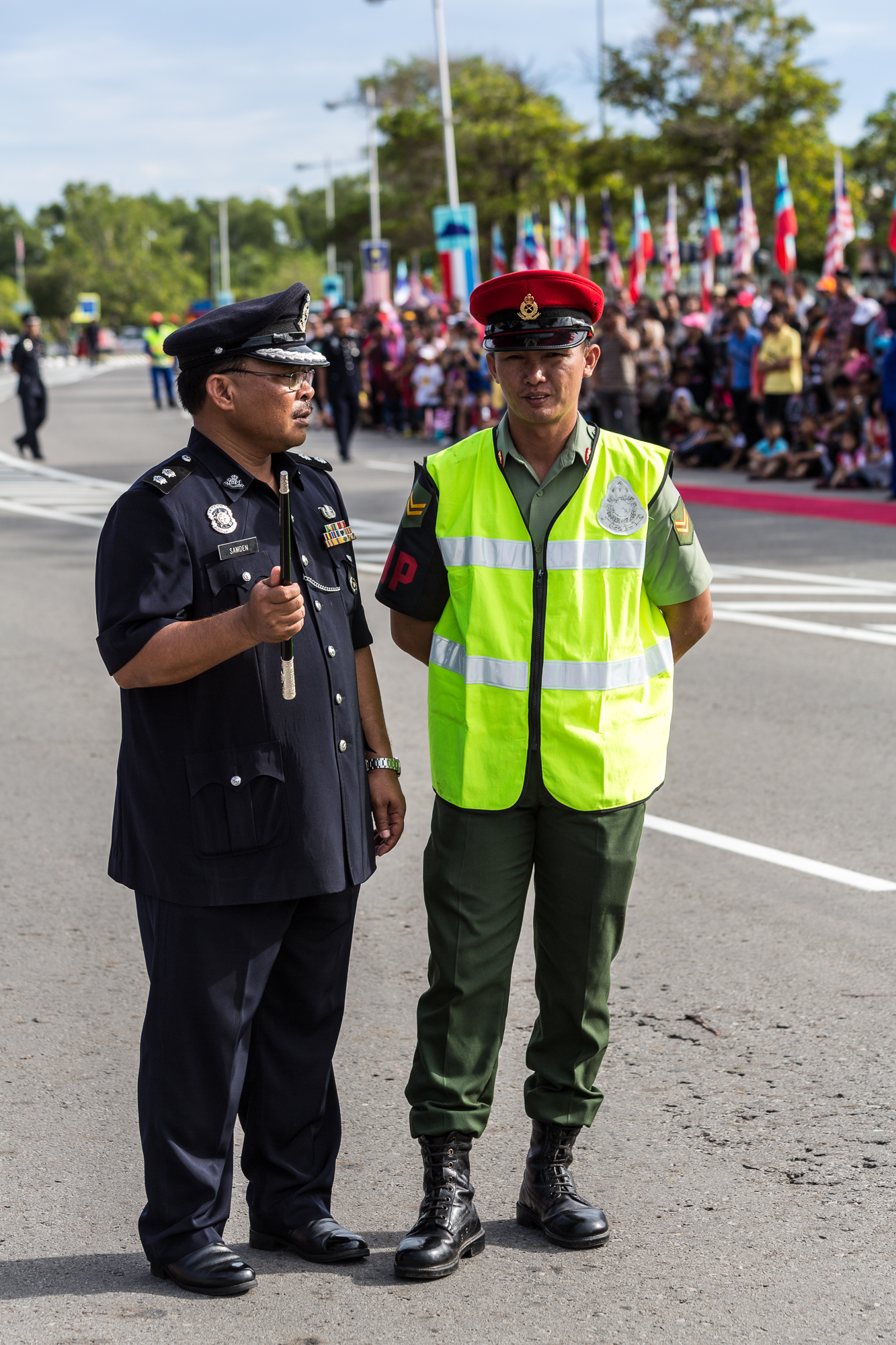
KPTD operator chatted with Police Superintendent in Likas, Sabah during 56th Merdeka Day.

The peacetime role of the Kor Polis Tentera DiRaja is to support and assist the Malaysian Army in training for war, and maintain discipline amongst military personnel.

In war, the Kor Polis Tentera DiRaja provides tactical military police support to the Army in all phases of operations, enforcement of military law and codes of conduct, crime prevention and controlling the flow of refugees and displaced persons.

== Organisation and units ==
The Military Police Directorate at the Markas Tentera Darat (Army Headquarters) oversee development and co-ordinate activities of Kor Polis Tentera DiRaja. The Provost Marshal of the Kor Polis Tentera DiRaja is a Brig. Jeneral.

On 1 January 1981, there were four Regiments in the Kor Polis Tentera, with one Regiment an organic component to each of the Infantry divisions in the Malaysian Army. A Military Police Company is attached to each of the three Brigades of the Division.

- 4 Regiments, one Military Police Regiment for each of the 4 Infantry Divisions.
  - Military Police Company attached to each Brigade
- Independent Military Police Companies

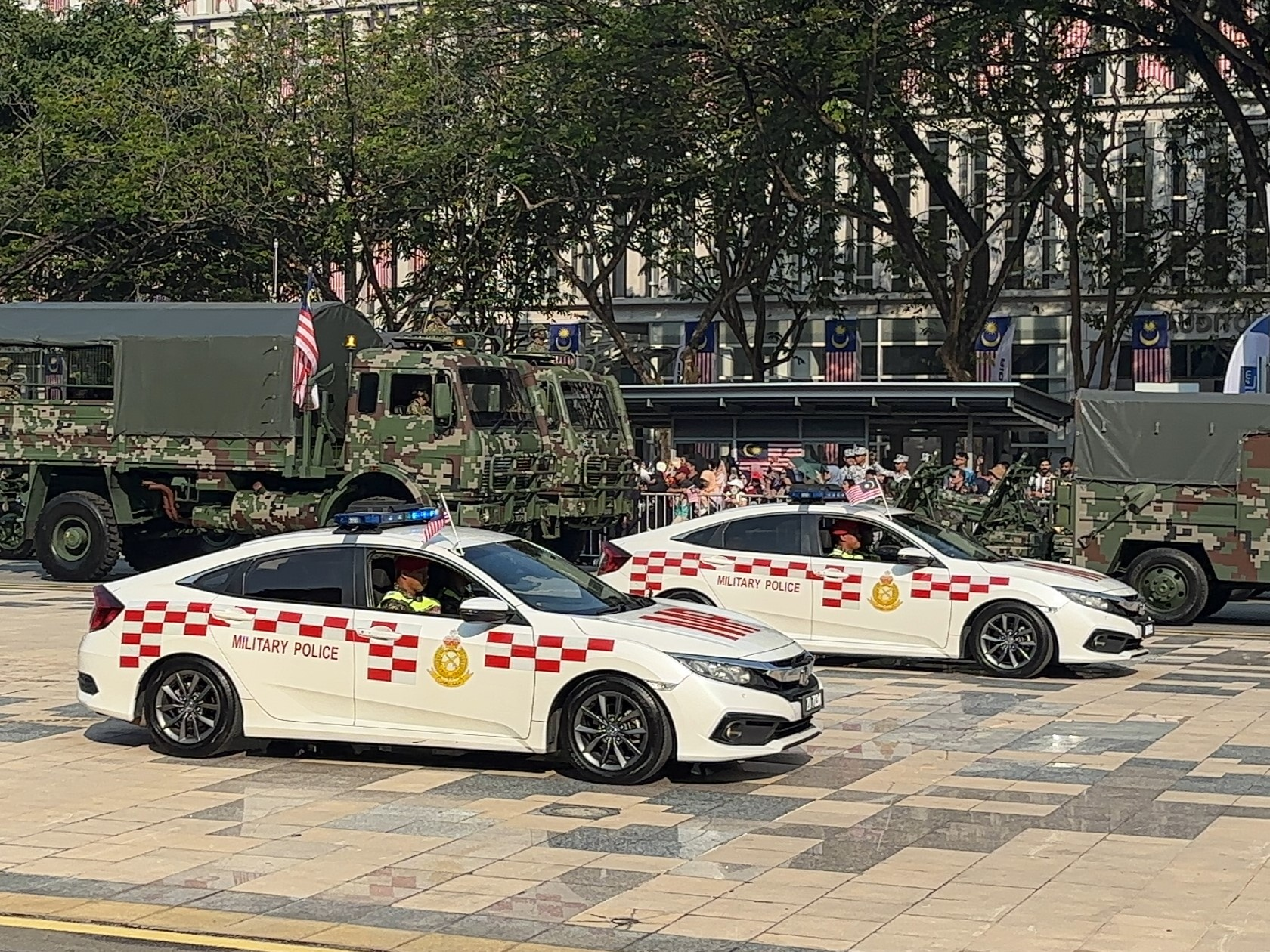
TDM Royal Military Police Corps Honda Civic 1.8S patrol vehicle during the 2024 Independence Day Military Parade in Putrajaya

=== Pusat Latihan Polis Tentera (PULAPOT) ===
The Pusat Latihan Polis Tentera (Military Police Training Centre) is located at Jalan Genting Klang, Setapak, Kuala Lumpur near to the main campus of Tunku Abdul Rahman College in the west and Wardieburn Camp, an army camp in the south. This is the Central Military Police Training Centre where soldiers are trained in military policing and military law. The MP school is responsible to train each military personnel in military police provost duty, investigation, martial arts and traffic duty.

== Wira Merah ==
The Wira Merah (Army Red Warriors) is a popular motorcycle acrobatic stunt and demonstration team of the Kor Polis Tentera DiRaja, famed for their show at military tattoos in Malaysia. The team was formed in 1963 at Kem Imphal in Kuala Lumpur to display their exceptional riding skills at the military tattoo during the 1963 National Day celebrations. The team was founded by Pegawai Waran I Sabdin Othman and Pegawai Waran I Ungku Hakim Ungku Mohamad. Its first equipment were 350cc BSA motorcycles.

The military shows were suspended between 1964 and 1966 due to the Indonesian Confrontation, but were resumed in 1967, when the Wira Merah team was reactivated under the command of Second Lieutenant Clifford Baptist for a display at the 10th National Day celebration at Stadium Merdeka, Kuala Lumpur.

The team has 40 members and holds about 48 shows a year, each of 30 to 40 minutes long. The act involves various acrobatic stunt on motorcycles including piling on 30 riders on one motorcycle. The Evel Knievel-styled jump is the highlight of the Wira Merah show, involving a jump over human or vehicular obstacles. The jump record is over 17 to 18 Proton Iswara cars.

The team presently uses a total of 29 motorcycles, including 12 Moto Guzzis, 6 BSA, 5 Modenas Jaguh, 2 Trial Bikes, 2 Aprilias and 2 Suzukis.
