= Royal Signal Regiment (Malaysia) =

Royal Signals Regiment
- Rejimen Semboyan Diraja
- Crest of Rejimen Semboyan DiRaja
- Active: 1949–present
- Country: Malaysia
- Branch: Malaysian Army
- Type: Communication
- Role: Strategic/tactical communication Electronic warfare Early warning
- Part of: Malaysian Armed Forces
- Mottos: Pantas dan Pasti (Swift and Sure)

Commanders
- Chief Signals Officer: Brigadier General Dato’ Ts. T.Azharan bin T.Putra
- Colonel-In-chief: HRH Tuanku Muhriz, the Yang di-Pertuan Besar of Negeri Sembilan

The Rejimen Semboyan Diraja (Royal Signals Regiment) is a combat support regiment of the Malaysian Army. It has the primary responsibility of establishing and maintaining secure military communications channels for the command and tactical elements of the Malaysian Army. It is also responsible for all electronic support, electronic warfare and early warning system for the Malaysian Army.

== History of Formation ==
The Royal Signals Regiment has its roots with the formation of a “Communications Troop” at the Training Depot of the Malay Regiment in Port Dickson in 1949. The Communications Troop was formed by centralising the radiomen of the signals Platoon of 1st, 2nd and 3rd Battalions of Royal Malay Regiment (Rejimen Askar Melayu).

With the expansion of size and roles given and undertaken by the Communications Troop, the unit was renamed the Federation Signals Squadron. The squadron was tasked with the responsibility of meeting all communications requirements of all operational units of the Malay Regiment.

With the formation of the Federation Army Brigade in 1952, the Federation Brigade Signals Squadron was formed. It was later known as Malaysian Signals Regiment. The date of the formation of the Federation Brigade Signals Squadron is the official date of the formation of the Royal Signals Regiment.

For its services rendered to King and country, the Malaysian Signals Regiment was bestowed the title “Royal” on 6 June 1992 and was henceforth known as Rejimen Semboyan Diraja (Royal Signals Regiment)

All recruits do their basic military training at an Army Training Centre in Port Dickson. Special-to-arm training is carried out at the Signals School (Sekolah Semboyan) at Sungei Besi Camp. The school is now known as Institut Komunikasi dan Elektronik Tentera Darat (IKED).

== Colonel in Chief and Chief Signal Officer ==
Colonel H.R.H. Tuanku Muhriz ibni Almarhum Tuanku Munawir, Yang di-Pertuan Besar of Negeri Sembilan is the present Colonel-in-Chief of the Regiment.

The present Chief Signals Officer holds the rank of Brigadier General. The current chief signals officer is Brigadier General Dato’ Ts. T.Azharan bin T.Putra who is the 18th Chief Signals Officer.

The first Malaysian Chief Signals Officer was Colonel (later Major General) Leong Siew Meng who was born in Ipoh, Perak. He was one of Gerald Templer's 12 "Templer Boys". He went to Eaton Hall and Royal Military Academy Sandhurst. He ended his army career as a Major General as Commandant of the National Defense College

== Regimental Crest and Motto ==
The Regimental Crest shows a Tern (Burung Camar Laut) denoting the messenger facilitating communications worldwide. The circle with the words “Rejimen Semboyan DiRaja” represents the services and excellence the Regiment has provided to the Malaysian Army. The Regimental Motto is ‘Pantas Dan Pasti’ (Swift and Sure) and is derived from Certa Cito, the motto of the Royal Corps of Signals of the British Army that was instrumental in establishing the Malaysian Royal Signals Regiment. The five-pointed crown is the crown used in the crest of the Royal Malay Regiment, form which the Signals Regiment traces its roots.

The Regimental Flag consists of the Regimental colours which are displayed horizontally. The Regimental colours are (from top to bottom) light blue, dark blue and green, that represents the Army, Air Force and Navy respectively. The three colours are separated by yellow between the light and dark blue, and red between the dark blue and green. The two additional colours portray that the Signal Regiment originates from the Royal Malay Regiment. The logo of the Signal Regiment is placed in the centre of the flag.

Among the roles and responsibilities of the Royal Signals Regiment is to provide tactical communications, electronic warfare, information warfare (C4ISR) for operational and training needs of the Malaysian Amy. The regiment also provides and maintains all communications and electronics equipment of the army.

== Institut Komunikasi dan Elektronik Tentera Darat ==
The Institut Komunikasi dan Elektronik Tentera Darat (IKED) (Army Communications and Electronics Institute) was formed in 1958 with the Training Troop of the Federation Army Signal Squadron to train Malayan signallers in communications. In 1964, the Training Troop was formally re-designated as Signals School. The name was later changed to Institut Komunikasi dan Elektronik Tentera Darat to better reflect the changing roles of the Royal Signals Regiment.

IKED administers 23 courses to fulfill the requirements of the Malaysian Army, with 10 courses for Officers and Senior Non-Commissioned Officers. Courses include cryptography and combat signals. IKED handles 700 to 1,300 trainees annually.

== Equipment ==
Ground Master 400

- Air Surveillance Radar
- S-band, 3D AESA Radar
- Performance:
  - Detection range - 5 to 390 km
  - Max detection rate in altitude - 30.5 km
  - Instrumented range - 470 km
- Electronic Counter-CounterMeasures (ECCM) capability
- Tactical ballistic missile (TBM) detection capability
- Quantity - 1 system

ERA VERA-E

- Air Surveillance Radar
- Passive radiolocator
- Nominal range - 450 km
- Up to 200 targets can be automatically tracked simultaneously
- Capable of detecting stealth aircraft
- Quantity - 2 systems

Selex RAT-31DL

- Air Surveillance Radar
- L-band, 3D phased array radar
- Nominal range - 400 km
- Tactical ballistic missile defence radar
- Quantity - 1 system

Selex RAT-31SL

- Air Surveillance Radar
- S-band, 3D phased array radar
- Nominal range - 450 km
- Quantity - 2 systems

Marconi Martello S-743D

- Air Surveillance Radar
- D-band, 3D radar
- Nominal range - 500 km
- Quantity - 2 systems

Hensoldt (EADS) TRML-3D

- Air Surveillance Radar
- C-band, 3D phased array radar
- Nominal range - 200 km
- Quantity - 2 systems (option on 8 more)
