= Royal Logistic Corps (Malaysia) =

Royal Logistics Corps is an organization that responsible providing logistical support includes managing the supply chain, ensuring the availability of essential resources like food, water, fuel, ammunition and overseeing the transportation of personnel and equipment for Malaysian Armed Forces. The corps is also responsible for the maintenance and repair of military vehicles and equipment, delivering medical services, emergency care and providing administrative support. By fulfilling these critical functions, the Royal Logistics Corps enables the Malaysian Army to maintain its effectiveness and readiness for various operations and missions.

== History ==
=== Early history ===
The establishment of the Royal Logistics Corps today is rooted in the establishment of the Malay Soldier Trial Company on March 1, 1933. It is one of the logistics elements placed under the Quartermaster Branch which provides assistance with transportation, supplies and food. At the initial stage, only transportation assistance was provided by this element exclusively, while for the supply and catering aspects it was obtained from local contractors. This logistical support system lasted until the establishment of two more Malay Soldier Regiment Battalions in 1948.

After the Second World War, the Armed Forces led by the British were reorganized, this was due to the growing threat of communist terrorists during the first Emergency Period. A logistics unit has been established to provide service assistance to the two Malay Soldier Battalions. The unit is known as the Malay Regiment Transport Unit (MRTU) which is based in Port Dickson. At that time, the supply of wet and dry rations for the Malay Soldier Battalion was provided by the Imperial Indian Army Supply Depot located in Seremban until the end of 1948.

Then it was taken over by the British Royal Army Service Corps (RASC) Supply Depot at the same location. In order to meet the needs of processing, packing and storing rations and also rations for air drop. The Malay Regiment Supply Depot (MRSD) was established in 1949. The MRSD was later transferred to Port Dickson and then disbanded in 1953. From 1954, ration packs for the use of the military forces were obtained from the Malayan Federal Police and other government agencies. The supply of petrol, oil and lubricant was managed by the RASC Supply Depot through its supply depot or certified public petrol stations until the middle of 1959.

In 1949, with the aim of monitoring the barracks needs of members including furniture stores and utility services (water supply and electricity), Barrack Services was established with a Barrack Officer, Barrack Store Accountant (BSA) and four Barrack Inventory Accountants (BIA) based in Port Dickson. In 1952, it continued to grow with the establishment of Store Barracks in Taiping, Perak. In the same year, the Federation Regiment was established which aimed to enable non-Malay citizens of Malaya at that time to serve in the Armed Forces. Therefore, MRTU has been renamed to Federation Transport Unit (FTU). The FTU is the first transport force in the Malaysian Armed Forces. It consists of two platoons and is equipped with 30 vehicles of the Bedford type. At the beginning of its establishment, the Service Corps was greatly influenced by elements from the British RASC which had an impact on the operational aspects as well as the administration of the force. Much of KPD's work system and culture today is based on the influence of the team.

=== Post independence ===
In April 1957 the Army Service Corps (ASC) was established by uniting the FTU, Malay Regiment Ordnance Depot and Malayan Other Ranks. However this organization did not last, on 15 July 1957, the Supply And Transport (S&T) Branch of the Department of Land Forces was established. The first director at the time was Lieutenant Colonel Chambers OBE. On the same date, several teams were established namely 52 Coy RASC (MT) was absorbed TD Malaya with the designation 3 Transport Company ASC then changed to 1 Transport Company ASC which is under the rule of 1 Federation Infantry Brigade.

The Supply Team was also established at that time which was the Federation Supply Depot (FSD) based in Batu Caves. Subsequently, the FTU was renamed to 3 Transport Company ASC and a British unit namely 29 Coy RASC (MT) was also absorbed into the ASC as 2 Transport Company ASC. This was the beginning of the evolution of the establishment of the Service Corps (KP). In order to support elements of the Malayan Navy and Air Force that had just been established, the ASC was also instructed to provide logistical assistance to the three service branches.

As such, on 27 May 1958, it was re-known as the Armed Forces Maintenance Corps (AFMC). The KP element within the AFMC has been known as the Federation Supply And Transport Service (FSTS). KP's development continued with FSD being renamed 1 Federation Supply Depot in October 1958 as soon as Lieutenant Colonel HI Charkham replaced Lieutenant Colonel Chambers as Head of Supply and Transport Branch. On 1 January 1959, the Federation Main Supply Depot was established in Batu Caves.

The Air Delivery Team (HU) was also established in the same year when 22 members from 1 Transport Company AFMC were selected to attend a course together with 55 AD Coy RASC based in Kuala Lumpur, in June 1960 AFMC's first air delivery mission was carried out with Malayan Air Force. In September 1960, Barrack Services was restructured with the handing over of Barrack Stores to Ordnance and leaving utility services to FSTS.

Until 1961, the S&T Branch had technical and operational control over ASC forces, although this changed with the establishment of HQ FSTS (AFMC) at Batu Kentonmen. This headquarters has taken over the responsibility to regulate the FSTS forces in the Peninsula. On 1 January 1962, 1 FSD and FMSD were merged into one unit which is 1 Supply Company (AFMC).

In September 1962, the first local to lead the S&T Branch was Colonel Ungku Ahmad bin Abdul Rahman. In June 1962, the first Air Supply Platoon was established which was known as the Federation Air Supply Platoon based at Jalan Ampang Camp. Later it was named 8 Air Supply Platoon on December 1, 1962, and was then moved to Taiping in 1963. Immediately after the establishment of Malaysia, several KP Headquarters were established, among them HQ FSTS AFMC South - Singapore (16 September 1963), HQ FSTS AFMC Borneo - Labuan (1 January 1965) and HQ FSTS AFMC North – Taiping (16 September 1963). 1965 was a significant year for the KP as a Corps, which on 9 April 1965 the elements within the AFMC were broken up as a corps. KP later became known as Malaysian Service Corps (MSC). However, the date 15 July 1957 is the date that has been set as the Service Corps Anniversary, based on the creation of supply and transport services in the ASC. On 7 June 1997, the Service Corps was awarded the title of 'Royal' in conjunction with the 75th Birthday Anniversary of His Majesty SPB Yang di-Pertuan Agong at the Merdeka Stadium. The certificate was received by the then director Colonel Abdul Majid bin Daudsha (retired Brigadier General). From that date, the Service Corps was titled the Royal Service Corps.
