= Royal Ordnance Corps (Malaysia) =

- Kor Ordnans DiRaja
- Active: 15 July 1957 (Official)
- Country: Malaysia
- Branch: Malaysian Army
- Part of: Malaysian Armed Forces

Royal Ordnance Corps (Kor Ordnans DiRaja) is a main corps in the Malaysian Army branch.
