= Royal Engineer Regiment (Malaysia) =

Royal Engineers Regiment
- Rejimen Askar Jurutera Diraja
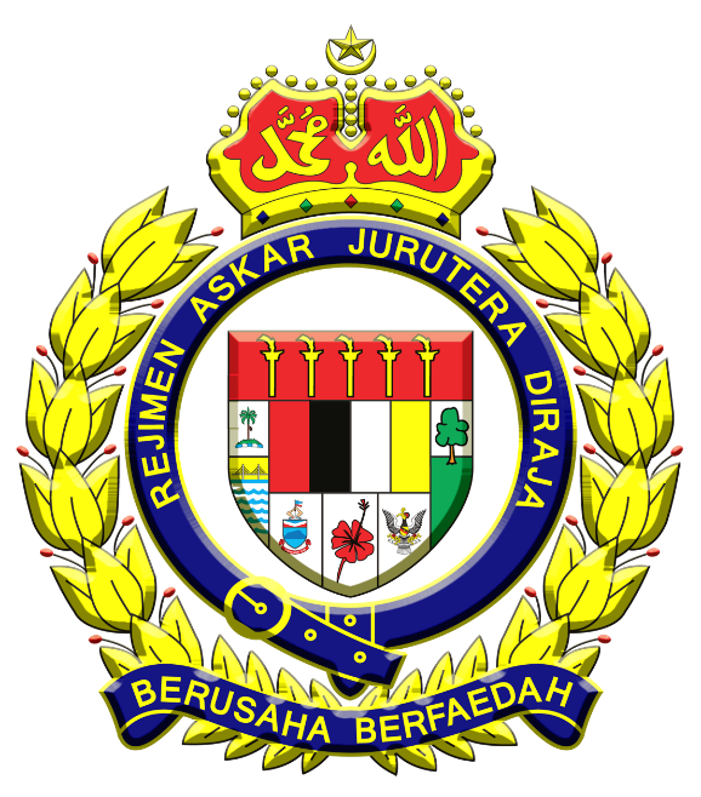
- Active: 22 April 1953
- Country: Malaysia
- Branch: Malaysian Army
- Type: Combat engineer
- Role: Army engineering maintenance Bomb disposal CBRN defense Close-quarters battle Construction; Demining; Demolition; Engineer reconnaissance Force protection Hyperbaric welding Jungle warfare Military engineering Raiding; Underwater demolition Urban warfare
- Size: Regiment
- Part of: Malaysian Armed Forces
- Garrison/HQ: Camp Sangro, Taiping, Perak "Home of the Engineers"
- Nickname: RAJD
- Mottos: Ubique (Everywhere); Berusaha Berfaedah (Strive and Benefit)

Commanders
- Colonel-in-Chief: Sultan Nazrin Muizzuddin Shah ibni Almarhum Sultan Azlan Muhibbuddin Shah Al-Maghfurlah, Paduka Seri Sultan of Perak

Royal Engineer Regiment (Rejimen Askar Jurutera DiRaja) is a group providing combat engineering support to the Malaysian Army.

== History ==
Rejimen Askar Jurutera DiRaja was founded on 22 April 1953 at Balaclava Lines Kluang Garrison Johor, after the first recruitment of 37 people was made at the Recruitment Training Center in Port Dickson. On 1 January 1954, 76th Federal Field Squadron was formed at Balaclava Lines Kluang Garrison. This was the first unit for federation engineers. In March 1954, major I. G. Wellsted RE began the formation of the federal field squadron. The branch is now known as the Engineer Directorate at the Malaysian Army HQ and 10 Engineer Training Detachment was formed at Kluang Garrison Johor. The unit is now known as the Army Institute of Field Engineering.

== Tasks of Royal Engineer Regiment ==
- Mobility
  - Construction, repair and maintenance of airfields and helicopter landing zone
  - Construction, repair and maintenance of roads, tracks, bridges and any other form of surface means of communication, waterways and expedient track ways
  - Bridging
  - Assistance in river crossing operations.
  - Removal or breaching of obstacles, including minefields and booby traps.
  - Assistance in assault demolition of enemy defenses and obstacles
- Counter mobility
  - Construction and development of obstacles such as road rooting, cratering and mining; abatis and minefields
  - Demolitions and denial operations
- Survivability and sustainability
  - Assistance to other arms and services with field defenses, camouflage and deception
  - Providing engineer services such as water supply, temporary accommodation, camp structures and decontamination facilities
  - To fight as infantry when the situation demands
- Undertake civic action projects to supplement the government's nation building programme
- Assist the government in implementing construction engineering projects Assist the Malaysian contingent in the UN peacekeeping mission
- Assist in restoring and operating important services namely major ports, railway networks, power plants and selected plants / dams
- Help maintain national security

== Colonel-in-Chief ==
The present Colonel-in-Chief is Sultan Nazrin Muizzuddin Shah ibni Almarhum Sultan Azlan Muhibbuddin Shah Al-Maghfurlah, the present Sultan of Perak. The regimental flag has horizontal bars of red, blue and yellow. The blue represents the renowned “Sapper Blue” colour used on Engineer tactical signs. Yellow represents the Malaysian Monarch and Red represents the sacrifices of the regiment and of military engineers in general.

The Regimental heraldic emblem is a Blue Garter of the Order of the Garter - which shares the blue color with the modern Order of the Defender of the Realm - with the regimental title in gold, the Garter, honoring the links to the United Kingdom and the British Army's Royal Engineers, surrounds the shield from the national arms. The Blue Garter, topped by the crown, is surrounded by a gold laurel wreath.

== Organisation ==
=== Regular army ===
- 8 field engineering squadrons
  - 1st Sqn RER
  - 2nd Sqn RER
  - 3rd Sqn RER
  - 5th Sqn RER
  - 6th Sqn RER
  - 7th Sqn RER
  - 8th Sqn RER
  - 9th Sqn RER
- 1 bridging squadron
  - 4th Sqn RER (Br)
- 1 x PARA Engineer Squadron
  - 10th Sqn RER (PARA)
- 1 x Mechanized Squadron
  - 11th Sqn RER (Mech)
- 1 x CBRNe squadron
  - 12th Sqn RER (CBRNe)
- 1 support regiment
  - 91st support regiment RER

=== Reserves / Territorial Army ===
- 4 field squadrons (Rejimen Askar Wataniah - AW)
  - 21st Sqn RER (AW)
  - 22nd Sqn RER (AW)
  - 23rd Sqn RER (AW)
  - 24th Sqn RER (AW)
- 4 specialist regiments (Rejimen Askar Wataniah - AW)
  - 40th Port Specialist Regiment (AW)
  - 50th Railway Specialist Regiment (AW)
  - 60th Water Supply Specialist Regiment (AW)
  - 70th Power Plant Specialist Regiment (AW)

=== Institut Kejuruteraan Medan Tentera Darat (IKEM) ===
Institut Kejuruteraan Medan Tentera Darat / IKEM (Army Field Engineering Institute) handles all training requirements of Rejimen Askar Jurutera DiRaja, specifically the training of the combat engineers.

=== Rejimen Pengendalian Pakar (Rejimen Askar Wataniah) ===
Rejimen Pengendalian Pakar (Rejimen Askar Wataniah) and the Skuadron Jurutera Medan Pakar (Rejimen Askar Wataniah) are volunteer reserve regiments and squadrons of the Rejimen Askar Wataniah. These units specialise in the handling of ports, waterworks, railway, power plant/electric supply or telecommunications.

=== Jabatanarah Jurutera ===
Engineer Directorate Jabatanarah Jurutera is headed by a Brigadier General (Chief Engineer) who manages the administration of Royal Engineer Regiment.

=== Bahagian Perkhidmatan Kejuruteraan Pertahanan (BPKP) ===
Defense Engineering Services Division An implementing agency for infrastructure development projects in ATM, maintains buildings under BPKP and is responsible for registering, maintaining and ensuring that ATM assets are properly maintained and recorded.

=== Unit Perkhidmatan Kejuruteraan Angkatan Tentera (UPKAT) ===
Armed Forces Engineering Service Unit A sub unit to BPKP as an implementing agency for infrastructure development projects in ATM, maintains buildings under ATM and is responsible for registering, maintaining and ensuring that ATM assets are properly maintained and recorded.

=== Bahagian Geospatial Pertahanan (BGSP) ===
Bahagian Geospatial Pertahanan is based at the Malaysian survey and mapping department (Jabatan Ukur dan Pemetaan) with the primary role of meeting the mapping requirements of the Malaysian Army. The defence geospatial division is headed by a brigedier general.
