= Royal Armoured Corps (Malaysia) =

- Kor Armor Diraja
- Regimental Crest of the Kor Amor DiRaja
- Active: 11 September 1952–present
- Country: Malaysia
- Branch: Malaysian Army
- Type: Armoured forces
- Role: Armoured warfare
- Part of: Malaysian Armed Forces
- Motto: Bersatu
- Colors: Black Beret

Commanders
- Colonel-in-Chief: HRH Sultan Mizan Zainal Abidin of Terengganu

The Royal Armoured Corps or Kor Armor Diraja (KAD) is the armoured forces of the Malaysian Army.

The Royal Malaysian Armoured Corps had its beginning with two army units formed by the British Administration headed by General Sir Gerald Templer who had initiated the formation during the Malayan Emergency. On 1 September 1952, the 1st Battalion Federation Regiment (Affiliated to Royal Irish Fusiliers) and the Federation Armoured Car Regiment (Affiliated to 13th/18th Royal Hussars (QMO) now known as The Light Dragoons) was also formed. Both regiments were the first multi-racial infantry and armoured units in Malaya.

The Federation Regiment and The Federation Armoured Car Regiment were merged on 1 January 1960 to form the Federation Reconnaissance Corps. Units under the Corps on its formation were the 1st Regiment Federation Reconnaissance Corps and the 2nd Regiment Federation Reconnaissance Corps, commonly referred to as 1 Recce and 2 Recce respectively, and in Malay they were known as Rejimen Pertama Kor Peninjau Persekutuan (1 Peninjau) and Rejimen Kedua Kor Peninjau Persekutuan (2 Peninjau). Both units were equipped with scout cars namely the Ferret scout car, Daimler scout car and other British made armoured cars.

== History ==
During the Congo Crisis, elements of the Federation Reconnaissance Corps participated in the United Nations Operation in the Congo from 1961 to 1963 as part of the Malaysian Special Force (MSF).

The corps was sent to Bosnia as part of the United Nations Protection Force (UNPROFOR) during the Bosnian War. The 3rd Regiment served as part of the Malaysian Battalion I (MALBATT I) from 1993 until it was relieved by the 2nd Regiment as part of MALBATT II. The 2nd Regiment were relieved in turn by the 1st Regiment as part of MALBATT III. Elements of the corps were involved again when the UNPROFOR was replaced by the Implementation Force (IFOR) and later Stabilisation Force in Bosnia and Herzegovina (SFOR) as part of the Malaysian Contingent (MALCON).

A specialised Armoured Parachute Squadron was formed on 12 September 1992 and organised under the 10th Paratrooper Brigade as part of the newly established Rapid Deployment Force, although it is also considered a constituent part of the Royal Armoured Corps. This squadron was equipped with Alvis Scorpion 90 light tanks before the type was retired. It is unclear what vehicles the squadron is now equipped with.

Armoured warfare training is undertaken at the Armour Training Centre at Sebatang Karah Camp in Port Dickson. Exchanges are made with friendly countries such as The United States, United Kingdom, Australia, France, India and Pakistan.

== Organisation and equipment ==
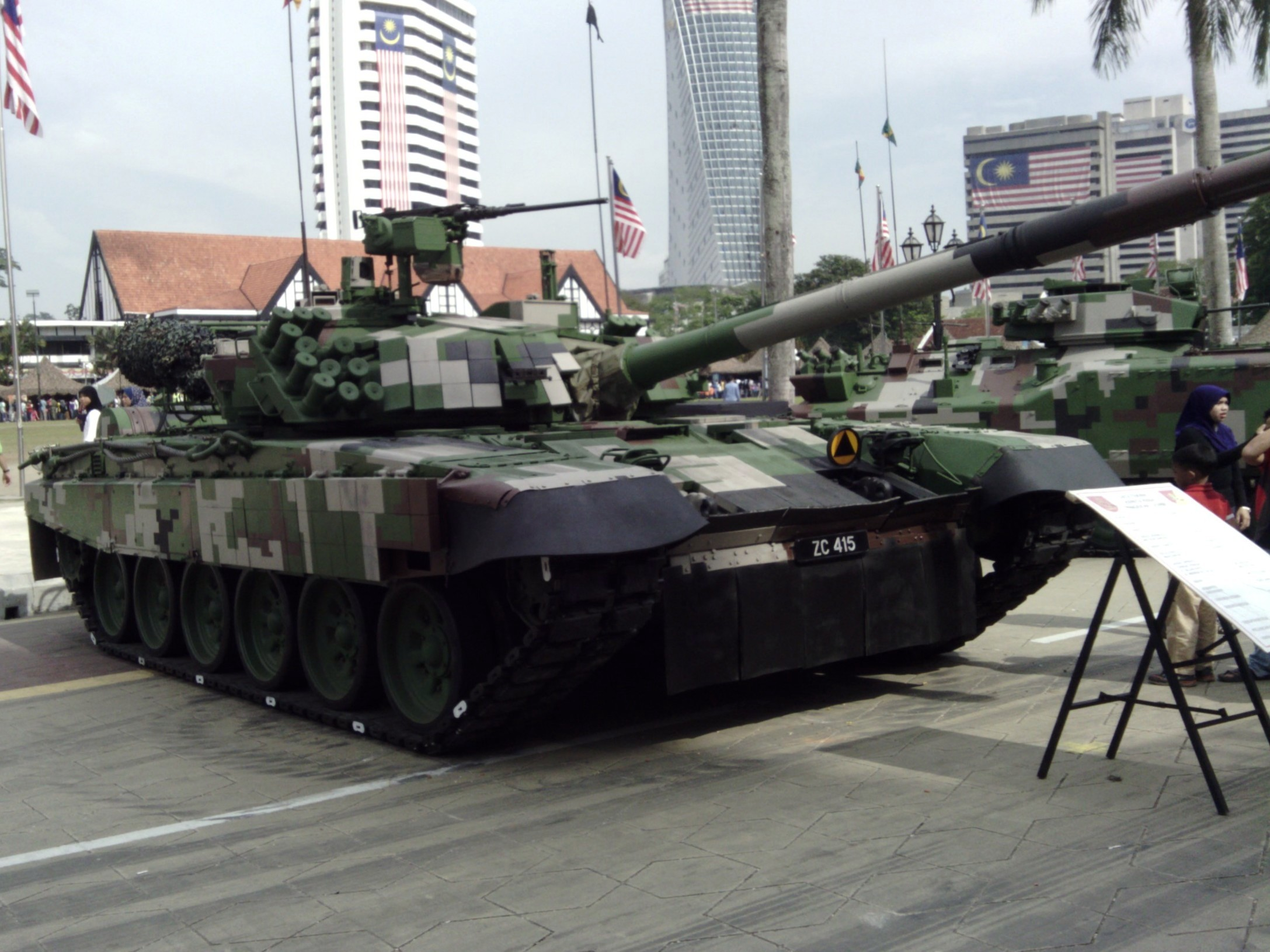
PT-91M Pendekar

The Royal Armoured Corps consists of six regiments, the 1st, 2nd, 3rd, 4th, 5th and 11th Regiments, an Armoured Parachute Squadron, ESSCOM Armoured Squadron and the 21st Ceremonial Cavalry Squadron (Skuadron Istiadat Berkuda).

The 11th Regiment is the only regiment of the Royal Armoured Corps which operates the PT-91M "Pendekar" main battle tanks.

- 48 - PT-91M Main Battle Tank
- 15 - PT-91M based support vehicles:-

6x WZT-4 armoured recovery vehicle
3x MID-M engineering tank
5x PMC Leguan - armoured vehicle-launched bridge
1x SJ-09 driver training tank

- ACV 300

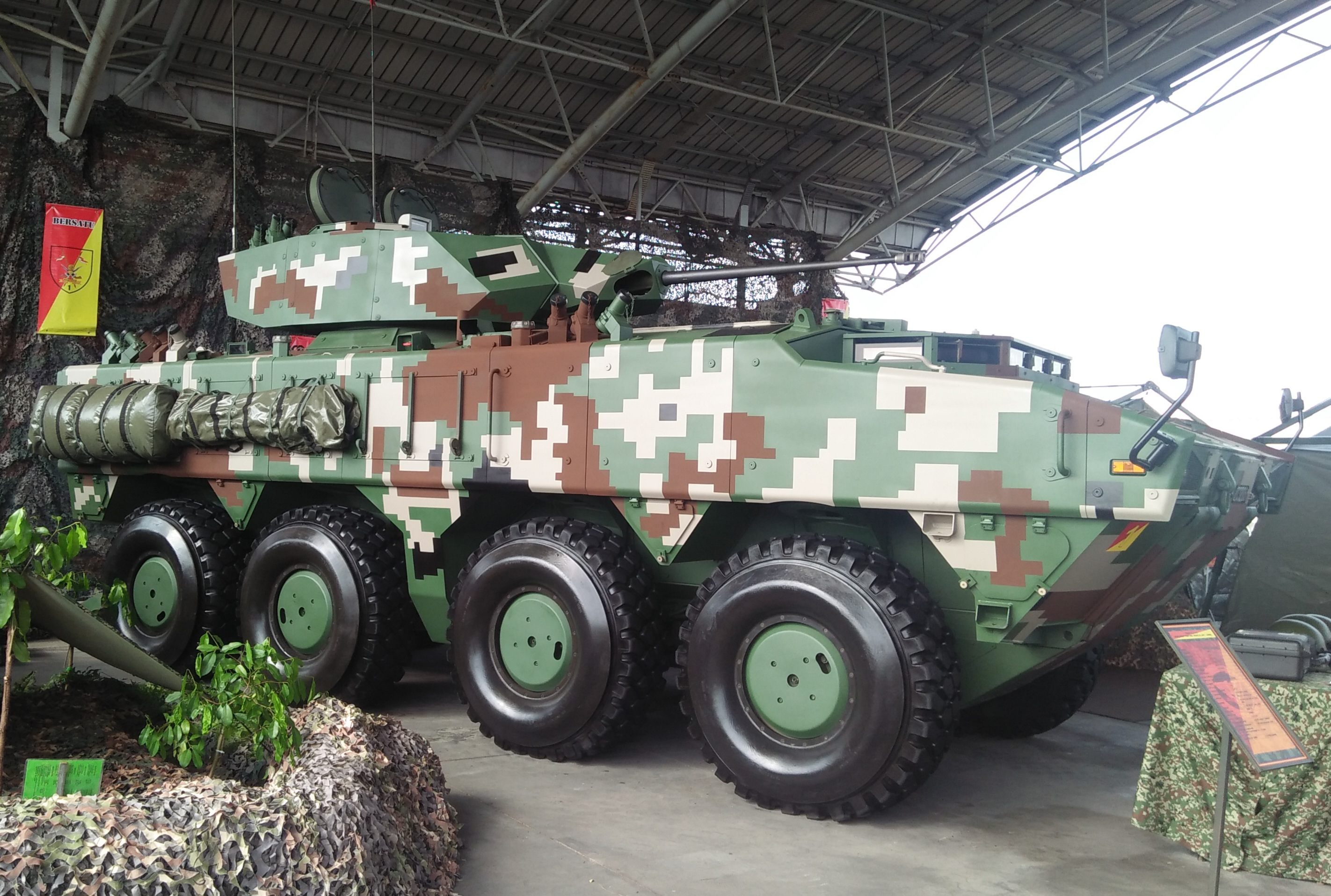
AV8 Gempita

- K200 KIFV
- Bv206 ATVs
- AV8 Gempita FNSS Defence Systems & DefTech (8x8)
- Sibmas 90 AFSV (6x6)
- Radpanzer Condor APC (4x4)

== Armour Museum ==
The Armoured Corps Museum is located in Sungala Camp, Jalan Sua Betong, Port Dickson, Negeri Sembilan. The late Sultan Mahmud Al-Muktafi Billah Shah Ibni Al-Marhum Al-Sultan Ismail Nasiruddin Shah, the Sultan of Terengganu, launched the museum on 4 September 1993. He was also then the Colonel-in-chief for the Royal Armoured Corps.

The museum aims to store for reference historical documents and artefacts of the Royal Armoured Corps, which has its Corps Home at the 2nd Royal Armoured Regiment, Sunggala Camp, Port Dickson.

== Alliances ==
- United Kingdom - The Light Dragoons; 2nd Regt
