= Uniforms of the Malaysian Army =

Malaysian Army attire and uniforms

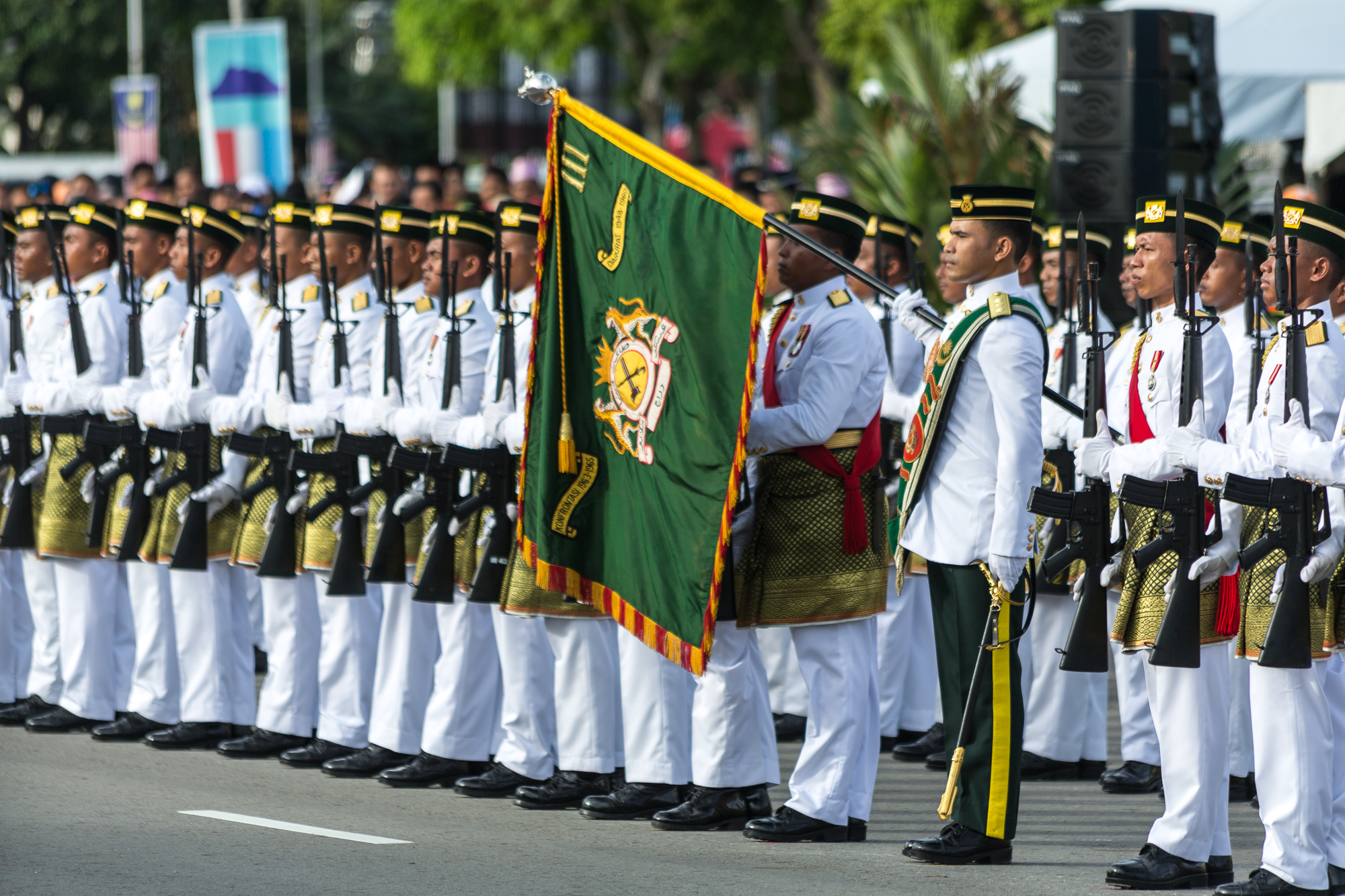
The No. 1 Ceremonial Dress worn by the 3rd Battalion, Royal Malay Regiment, during Merdeka Day in 2013. Three distinct variations are shown here, corresponding to different ranks. Officers wore dark-green trousers without a samping, while other ranks wore the uniform with a samping.

The uniforms of the Malaysian Army are divided into two main categories: numbered orders of dress and combat uniforms. There are currently nine types of numbered orders of dress in use, following the discontinuation of No. 4 Dress. As a member of the Commonwealth and a former British colony, the Malaysian Army has inherited many aspects of its dress and traditions from the British Armed Forces and other Commonwealth militaries. The beret serves as the principal headdress and is worn with most categories of uniform.

== Overview ==
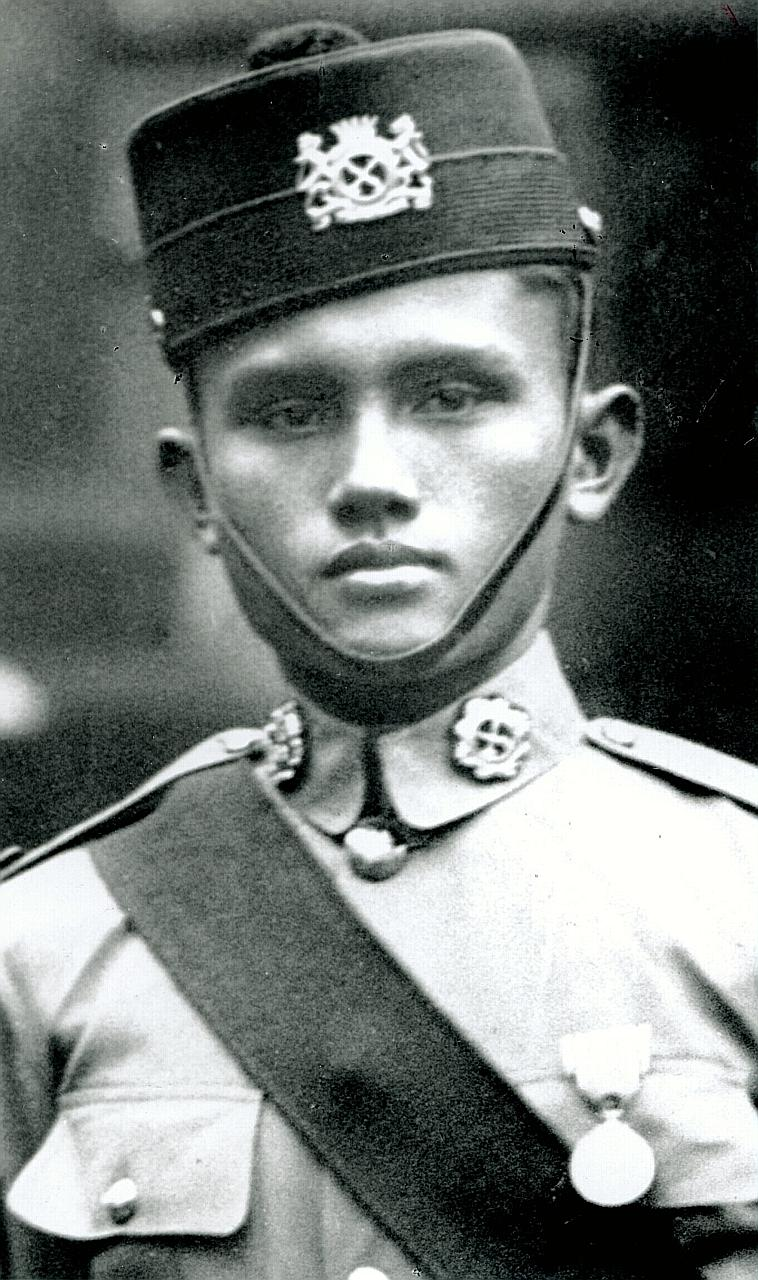
Then-Sergeant Adnan Saidi of the Malay Regiment in khaki full dress, circa 1940–1941. He was promoted to second lieutenant in late 1941. In this image, he is wearing a black with red trims pillbox hat.

The Malaysian Armed Forces inherited many of their uniform styles and traditions from the United Kingdom and other Commonwealth nations such as Australia and New Zealand. These countries played significant roles both before and after Malaysia's independence, particularly during major conflicts involving Malaysia, such as the Second World War, the Malayan Emergency, and the Communist Insurgency in Malaysia.

As a result of these influences, Malaysian Army uniforms are classified into two types. Numbered orders of dress is worn for daily duties, parades, and ceremonial occasions, while combat uniforms are used for operational and field duties.

== Laws that protect the wearing of the Malaysian Armed Forces attire ==
To prevent the uniforms from being misused in connection with criminal activities and to uphold the dignity of the Armed Forces, at least three laws were enacted. These laws are detailed as follows:

- PENAL CODE (F.M.S CAP 45)
  - Section 140. Wearing the Dress of a Soldier.
- MINOR OFFENCES ACT 1955 (ACT 336)
  - Section 16. Unlawful Possession of Military, Naval, Air Force or Police.
  - Section 25. Wearing Unauthorised Uniform.
- OFFICIAL SECRET ACT 1972 (ACT 88)
  - Section 9. Unauthorised use of Uniform, Falsification, of Reports, Forgery, Personating, and False Documents.
    - (a) Users or wears, without lawful authority, any naval, army, air force, police or other official uniform, or any uniform so nearly resembling the same as to be likely deceive, or falsely represents himself to be a person who is or has been entitled to use or wear any such uniform

== History ==
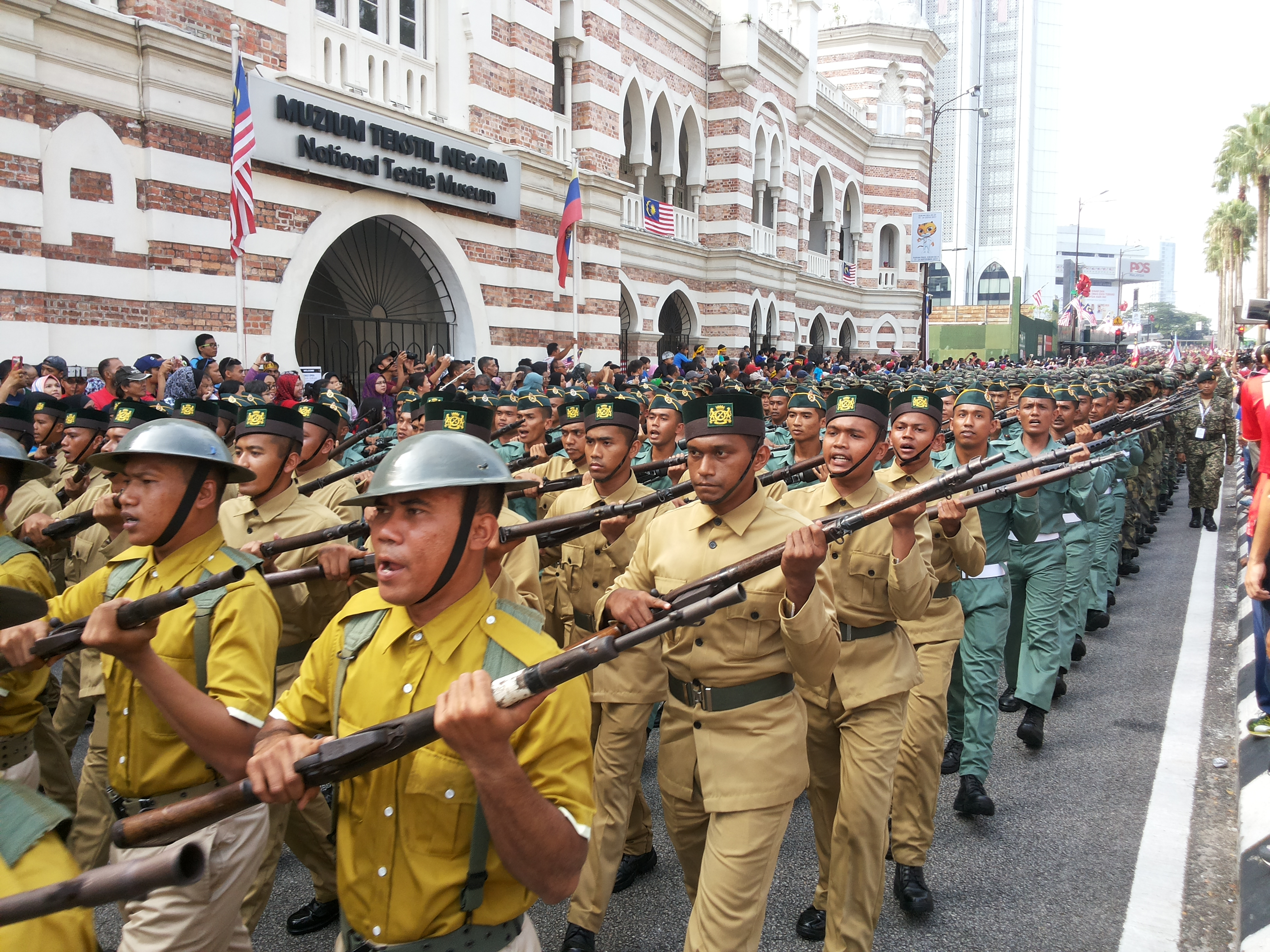
Malaysian Army personnel marching while showcasing army uniforms from the colonial era to the present day during the 60th Merdeka Day Parade in Kuala Lumpur.

The region now known as Malaysia was once a federation of several British colonies. In addition to the British and Commonwealth troops garrisoned in these territories, each colony maintained its own territorial gendarmerie forces, which served dual roles as both military and law enforcement bodies. From that period to the present day, the uniforms of the region's ground forces have undergone significant evolution. The following is a brief historical overview of the development of army uniforms in Malaysia.

=== Under British ===
1880s–1900s: Gendarmerie uniforms

Although Malaysia gained independence in 1957, its military origins date back to the late 19th century, when several gendarmerie and paramilitary forces were formed in the states of British Malaya and Borneo. Among these were the Johor Military Forces, the Sarawak Rangers, and the Selangor Military Police Force, which served both military and law enforcement functions. The Selangor Military Police Force was later integrated with other state police forces, forming the foundation of what would become the Royal Malaysian Police.

During this period, uniforms varied between units but reflected influences from both the United Kingdom and the Ottoman Empire. The Selangor Military Police Force wore a navy-blue uniform inspired by Victorian-era British police attire, complemented by a white-and-blue fez modelled after Ottoman military dress, while the Sarawak Rangers wore a similar uniform but with a red fez.

This style remained in use until the early 1900s, when the British authorities introduced the khaki uniform as the standard dress for colonial and locally raised uniformed forces. At that time, these units typically possessed only a single uniform type, worn for all purposes, including daily duties and combat operations.

1900s–1950s: Khaki uniforms and the Malay Regiment's white walking-out dress

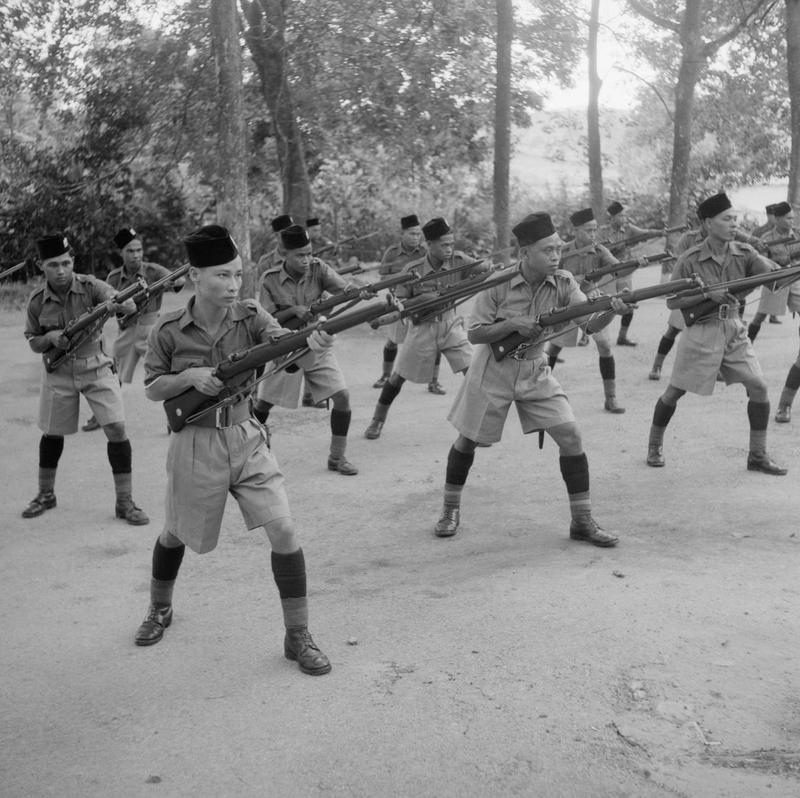
Soldiers of the Malay Regiment practising a bayonet charge in 1941. They are shown wearing the tropical variant of the British battledress with rifle green lanyards. Due to the hot climate, shorts were worn instead of trousers. The headdress varied according to availability and rank, with soldiers wearing either a light brown slouch hat or a dark green songkok, while NCOs wore a black pillbox hat.

During this period, British forces began adopting three distinct types of uniforms. For British troops stationed in Malaya, these comprised the Field Uniform (Service Dress), a khaki outfit used for general purposes; the Full Dress, a formal ceremonial uniform; and the Walking-out Dress, worn while off duty.

The khaki uniform was introduced following British experiences in colonial campaigns in India and South Africa and was subsequently adopted by British forces in Malaya. Local military and police units soon followed suit, adopting khaki as their standard service dress in accordance with British practice. The Johor Military Forces, for instance, wore khaki attire distinguished by a red pillbox hat, while police units wore a similar uniform paired with a black pillbox hat. The British Army in Malaya also incorporated the slouch hat into its khaki drill uniform, influenced by Gurkha and Australian forces garrisoned in the region. The slouch hat later became a distinctive regimental identity for the Malay Regiment (now the Royal Malay Regiment) until the 1970s, when it adopted the rifle green beret to symbolise its role as a light infantry regiment.

For ceremonial occasions, the Malay Regiment adopted two categories of tropical dress. Officers wore the standard British Army khaki bush jacket with a rifle green and black pillbox hat, while other ranks wore a khaki drill uniform paired with a dark grey-brown (taupe) sash, white belt, tan shorts, rifle green cord lanyards, dark brown socks, and either a rifle green and black pillbox hat or a cocoa-brown songkok trimmed in yellow. The use of rifle green reflected the regiment's light infantry heritage, inspired by the Gurkha Rifles. Other British units stationed in Malaya continued to wear the standard khaki bush jacket as their formal attire. The khaki uniform remained in use among Malayan units until the Second World War, reflecting the enduring influence of British military traditions blended with local cultural identity.

For walking-out dress, officers wore their khaki ceremonial attire, while other ranks donned a white drill uniform consisting of a white baju Melayu, red cord shoulder boards, a rifle green lanyard, a dark rifle green songkok or pillbox hat, and a green songket samping decorated with gold accents. The Malay Regiment's white drill uniform drew inspiration from the white tropical dress worn by British forces in India during the First World War. This design later influenced the ceremonial uniforms now worn by most corps and regiments of the Malaysian Army.

1939–1960s: Jungle green uniform and 1937 British battledress

The British introduced the jungle green uniform in 1939 for military units stationed in the Far East, including those deployed in Malaya. Despite this introduction, the khaki drill uniform remained the standard attire for most duties until the 1950s. Although the jungle green uniform was officially adopted, its initial distribution in Malaya was limited, and many British troops continued to wear the tropical variant of the 1937 Pattern battledress during the Malayan Campaign of the Second World War.

In the late 1930s, the British Army also introduced the beret in Malaya when the 4th Queen's Own Hussars were stationed in Singapore. The regiment were photographed marching through the city in 1939 wearing their distinctive black berets shortly after arrival. The first locally established armoured unit, the Armoured Car Company of the Federated Malay States Volunteer Force, formed in the same year, later adopted the black beret as its official headdress, following British armoured tradition.

In 1940, the British introduced a new combat uniform known as the battledress, originally designed for use in temperate climates. For units garrisoned in Malaya, a tropical variant was issued, produced in lighter fabric and coloured in cocoa brown. This uniform was typically worn with tan or dust-brown shorts and beige puttees.

For the Malay Regiment, the battledress featured a single white stripe on each sleeve and was usually worn with a black pillbox hat with red trim for non-commissioned officers or a brown slouch hat for other ranks. British and Commonwealth troops who fought in the Malayan Campaign were frequently photographed wearing this tropical 1937 Pattern battledress in combination with the Brodie helmet.

1950s: White full dress

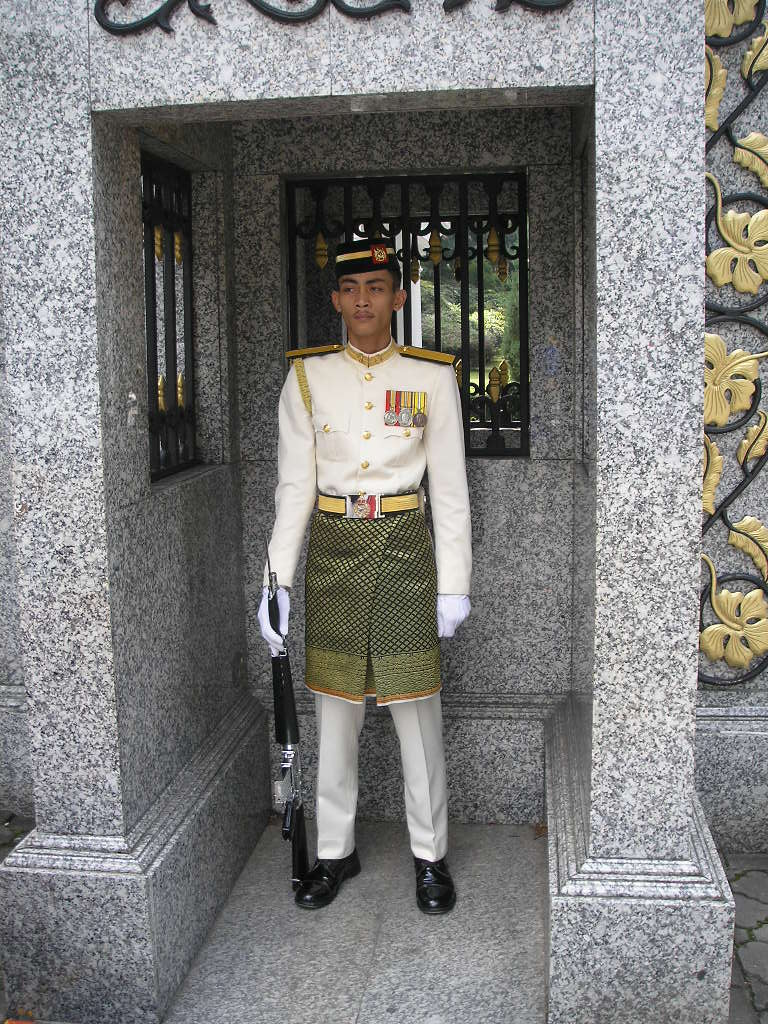
The No. 1 Ceremonial Dress worn by a Malaysian Army private on public duties as a palace guard at the former Istana Negara in 2007. This uniform attracted international attention when the Royal Malay Regiment became the first foreign military unit to perform public duties in London in 2008.

The current white ceremonial dress, officially designated as the No. 3 Warm Weather Ceremonial Uniform, was introduced in the early 1950s by the British Armed Forces for personnel stationed in tropical regions, including those deployed in Malaya. This uniform replaced the khaki ceremonial drill dress previously worn by the Royal Marines and British Army units stationed in the region. Officers wore an all-white full dress complemented by a brown Sam Browne belt, while other ranks, apart from those of the Malay Regiment, wore an all-white uniform with a black waist belt. For the Malay Regiment, the white drill uniform that had served as the walking-out dress for other ranks since 1933 was adopted as the official full dress, now worn with a white waist belt alongside the traditional green and gold songket samping. This tradition continues in the present day, with most corps and regiments of the Malaysian Army still wearing the white tunic as their ceremonial attire.

In 1953, during the coronation of Queen Elizabeth II, the British Armed Forces revived the use of coloured full dress uniforms for the coronation parade. Many combat units reinstated the red coats that had been replaced by khaki service dress, while other units reintroduced blue and rifle-green tunics according to their regimental traditions. As a regiment of the British Army at the time, the Malay Regiment also participated in the coronation parade in London. The regiment wore its white full dress uniform during the event, which was subsequently established as its official ceremonial attire and became a defining element of its regimental identity. During this period, a new variation of the full dress was also introduced for officers between the ranks of second lieutenant and lieutenant colonel, who wore a white tunic paired with dark green trousers with a gold stripe, the same colour as the songkok worn by the regiment since the 1930s.

=== Post-independence ===
1957–1960s: All white ceremonial dress

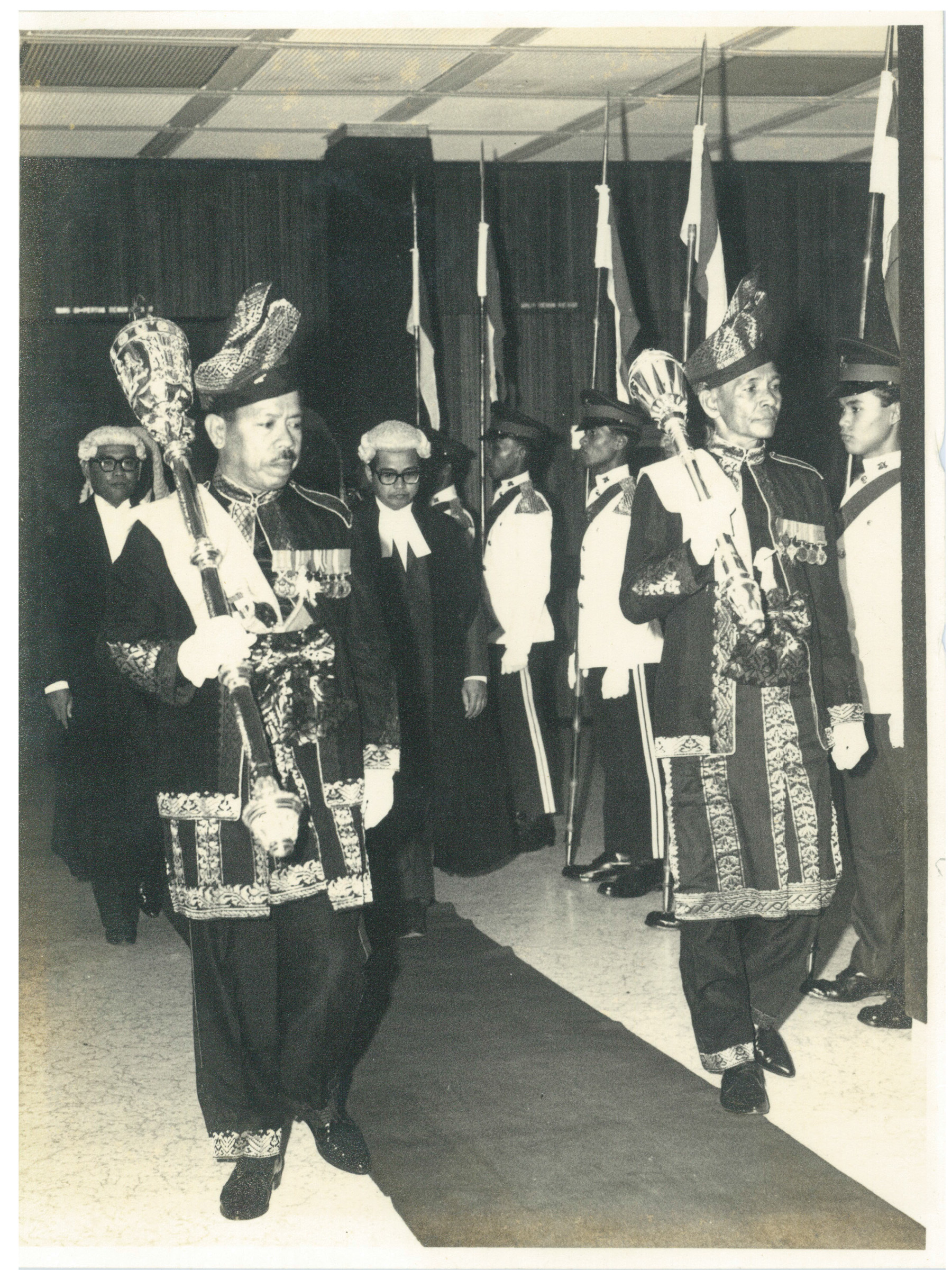
A photograph from the mid-1960s showing the opening ceremony of the Malaysian Parliament. Soldiers from the Federation Reconnaissance Corps (present-day Royal Armoured Corps) are seen standing at attention with lances. The soldier is wearing a white tunic with black trousers featuring gold stripes and chain mail shoulder scales symbolising the unit's historical connection with the 4th Queen's Own Hussars, who were stationed in Malaya in the late 1930s and helped establish the local armoured cavalry unit.

After Malaya achieved independence in 1957, the army continued to use the jungle green uniform as its service dress and continued to use the all-white ceremonial dress for formal occasions. All branches of the newly established Malaysian Armed Forces, including the army, navy, and air force, wore all-white uniforms.

The Royal Malay Regiment distinguished itself with the addition of a green samping worn over the uniform, a tradition it had maintained since 1933. The adoption of the all-white dress was largely influenced by affordability and economic considerations, which suited the financial constraints of the newly independent nation. By the 1970s, the army began reverting to jungle green uniforms while the air force began reverting to khaki uniforms for formal use. The white ceremonial dress introduced during this period continues to influence the design of modern Malaysian military ceremonial uniforms.

During this time, the Royal Malay Regiment adopted the dark green songkok and khaki slouch hat as its regimental headdress, while the Federation Regiment wore the olive terai hat. Other units used a dark green side cap with gold trim, and officers wore a peaked cap.

1970s–present: Reformation and continuation of traditions

From the late 1960s to the mid-1970s, the Malaysian Armed Forces began expanding their military cooperation beyond the United Kingdom and the Commonwealth. Delegations were sent to countries such as the United States, France, and West Germany (now Germany) to study their military systems. The exchange of knowledge and practices with these nations influenced the organisational structures and modernisation of the Malaysian Armed Forces, including the army.

During this period, the army gradually transitioned from the British-style jungle green service uniform to one incorporating elements inspired by the United States Army's green "Class A" service uniform. However, instead of adopting the grey-green shade used by the US Army, the Malaysian Army selected a dark green colour that closely resembled the original 1930s songkok colour. In the early 2000s, this shade was further modified to a lighter palm-green tone. The change applied solely to the working uniform, while ceremonial occasions continued to follow British traditions, with each corps and regiment maintaining its own distinctive ceremonial attire. The Royal Armoured Corps and the Royal Military Police Corps were the first formations to adopt unique ceremonial uniforms that reflected their respective regimental identities.

By 1970, the beret had become the principal headdress of the Malaysian Army, replacing earlier styles such as the slouch hat and forage cap. The Malaysian Ranger Regiment (present-day Royal Ranger Regiment) was the second unit to adopt the beret in 1964, following the Federation Armoured Car Regiment (present-day Royal Armoured Corps).

== Numbered orders of dress ==
The Malaysian Army currently employs nine numbered orders of dress, with the No. 10 order comprising at least five variations depending on personnel's specialisation and role. The numbered orders of dress in the Malaysian Army do not include the combat uniform. The current orders of dress are as follows:

=== No 1: Ceremonial dress ===
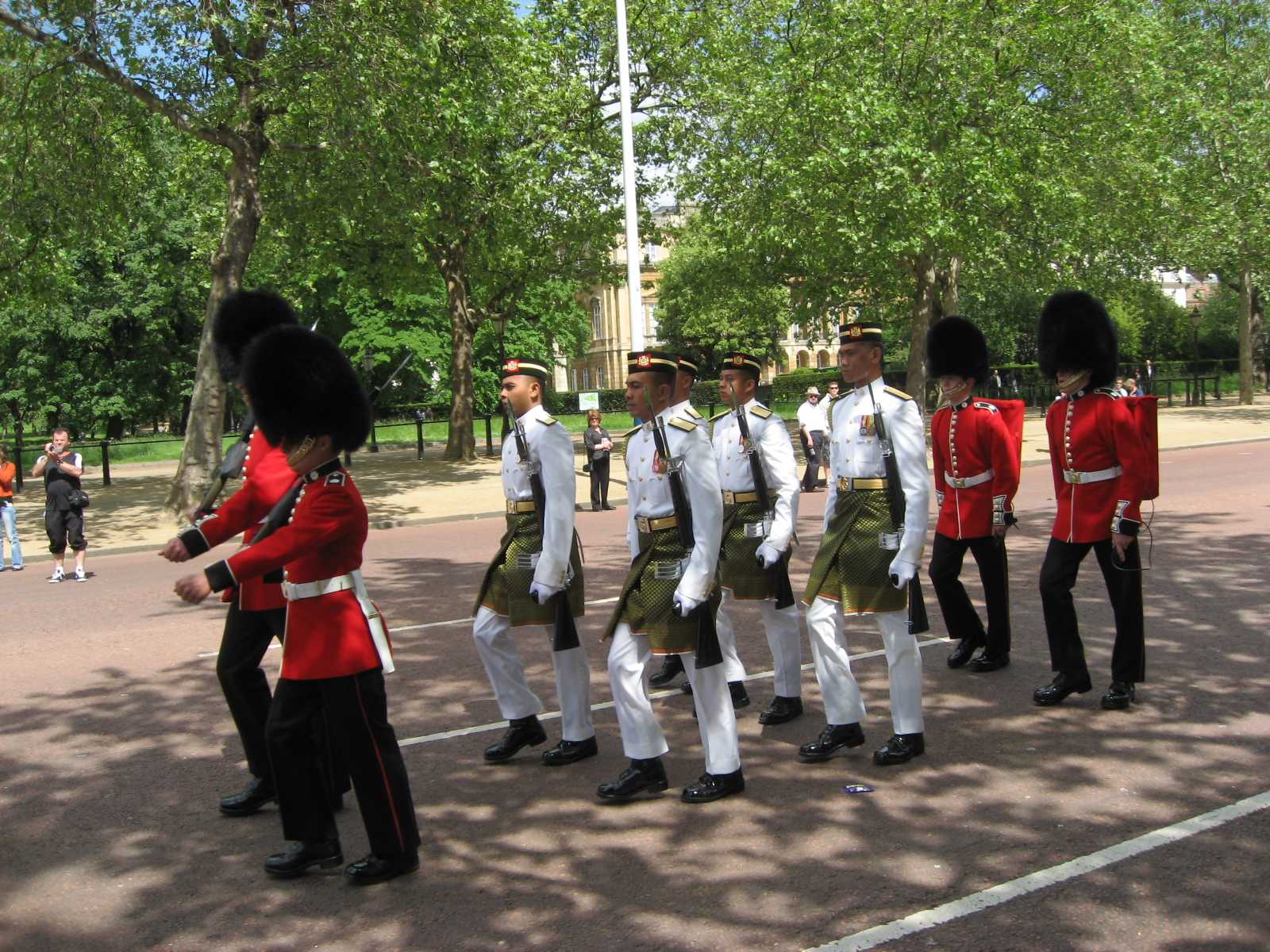
Soldiers from the Royal Malay Regiment and the Coldstream Guards marching in London in 2008. The Royal Malay Regiment was deployed for public duties, guarding historic sites such as Buckingham Palace and the Tower of London. Although once part of the British Army, it became the first foreign military unit to be entrusted with such duties.

The No. 1 Dress serves as the principal ceremonial attire and symbol of identity for the corps and regiments of the Malaysian Army. Known in Malay as No. 1 Pakaian Istiadat, this uniform is worn on several formal occasions, including:

- Medals, Stars, and Honours Conferment Ceremonies
- Regimental Colours Presentation and Replacement Ceremonies
- Regimental Colours Trooping Ceremonies
- Wreath-laying ceremonies held in conjunction with the federal-level Warriors' Day (Malay: Hari Pahlawan) celebration
- State funerals of the Yang di-Pertuan Agong and the Raja Permaisuri Agong, the Sultans or Rulers and Sultanas or Raja Perempuans, the Yang di-Pertua Negeri (State Governors) and their spouses, senior state dignitaries, and military officers
- Ceremonial parades and other events that require this attire

During the 1970s, the Malaysian Army formalised the ceremonial uniforms for its corps and regiments, retaining the British practice of allowing each to maintain its own variation. The British Army's white warm-weather ceremonial uniform influenced the design adopted by the Malaysian Army, with almost all corps and regiments wearing white tunics. This uniform has three variations according to rank. Generals to Warrant Officers Class 1 wear a white tunic with dark green trousers. Warrant Officers Class 2 to Sergeants wear an all-white uniform with a green samping and a red sash. Corporals and below wear a similar uniform but without the sash. The green samping are unique Malay features not present in British Army dress. This ceremonial attire was derived from the Malay Regiment's white walking-out dress of the 1930s.

The uniform is worn with an aiguillette. Generals to Warrant Officers Class 1 wear the version with one large gold braid and two gold-and-red cords, while Warrant Officers Class 2 and below wear a single small gold braid. All ranks wear a dark green songkok with the ceremonial dress. Officers who have completed special forces selection or the rapid deployment force pipeline are permitted to wear the Sherwood green or maroon beret with their ceremonial uniform. At present, most corps and regiments use this standard ceremonial dress pattern.

The Royal Armoured Corps ceremonial uniform is influenced by British cavalry regiments, featuring a red tunic in place of the traditional blue. Officers and other ranks wear almost identical uniforms, with distinctions made only through accessories. Their ceremonial dress has two variations: ceremonial and cavalry. For the cavalry variation, personnel wear the same uniform with the addition of white cavalry gloves and riding boots. The headdress is a black and gold peak cap with red trim.

The Royal Military Police Corps ceremonial dress uniform was influenced by that of the British Army's Royal Military Police. Rather than using a black tunic, the Malaysian version features a white tunic. The corps also adopted a red peak cap similar to that worn by its British counterpart, although the Malaysian version uses a darker chilli-red shade instead of scarlet.

Officer cadets also have distinct ceremonial dress uniforms. Cadets of the National Defence University of Malaysia (NDUM) wear a red colour scheme, while those of the Army Academy wear green. Both institutions use the peak cap as part of the headdress rather than the songkok. NDUM cadets wear three aiguillettes similar to those used in the standard Malaysian Army ceremonial dress, consisting of one large gold braid and two gold-and-red cords. Army Academy cadets wear two aiguillettes consisting of one large gold-and-red braid and one small gold-and-red braid.

Variations of the Malaysian Army No. 1 Ceremonial dress
The generic No. 1 Dress for Malaysian Army commissioned officers and Warrant Officer Class 1. This uniform is worn by most corps and regiments, excluding those that have their own distinct versions.

The No. 1 Dress serves as the generic ceremonial uniform for Malaysian Army personnel ranging from the rank of Private to Warrant Officer Class 2, across corps and regiments that do not maintain dedicated uniform variants. Personnel holding the rank of Sergeant and above are distinguished by the addition of a red sash worn across the shoulder.

No. 1 Dress of the Royal Armoured Corps. This specific uniform design is worn by officers.

No. 1 Dress of the Royal Armoured Corps. This specific uniform design is worn by other ranks.

No. 1 Dress of the Royal Armoured Corps (Cavalry Officer). For the cavalry variation, personnel wear the same uniform with the addition of white cavalry gloves and riding boots

No. 1 Dress of the Royal Armoured Corps (Cavalry Other ranks). For the cavalry variation, personnel wear the same uniform with the addition of white cavalry gloves and riding boots

The No. 1 Dress of the Royal Military Police Corps is worn exclusively by Other Ranks, featuring a black brassard embroidered with red letters reading "MP" for Military Police.

No. 1 Dress of the Malaysian Army officer cadets. This specific uniform design is worn by officer cadets commissioned from the Malaysian Army Academy.

No. 1 Dress of the Malaysian Army officer cadets. This specific uniform design is worn by officer cadets assigned to the Malaysian Army and commissioned from the National Defence University of Malaysia (NDUM).

=== No. 2: Bush jacket dress ===
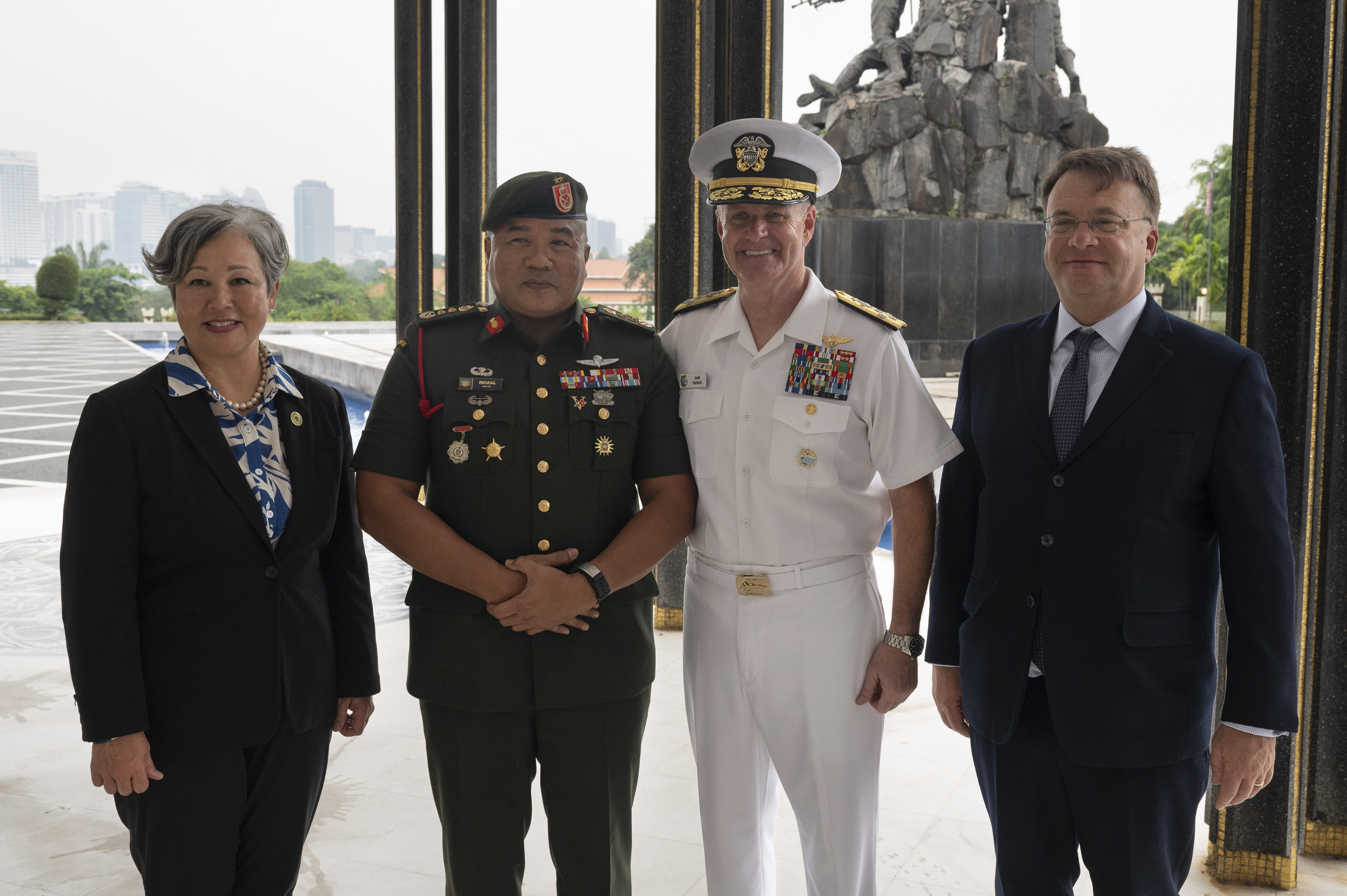
Major General (Ts.) Reizal Arif Ismail, then-Assistant Chief of Staff of the Malaysian Armed Forces, received an official visit from the Commander of the United States Indo-Pacific Command in May 2025. He is depicted wearing the No. 2 Dress (Bush Jacket), featuring red gorget patches on the collar, which is a distinction reserved for officers holding the rank of Colonel and above.

The No. 2 Dress is the official service attire worn by Malaysian Army personnel from the rank of General to Warrant Officer Class 2 when performing formal or official duties. This uniform is typically worn on several official occasions, including:

- Attending Court Martial
- On duty as Duty Officer
- Wreath Laying Ceremony in conjunction with the State-level Warriors' Day celebration
- Visiting the deceased and attending the funeral ceremony
- Attending a parade event where the parading personnel wear No. 3 Dress (Drill)
- Making a courtesy call on senior state dignitaries or having an audience with the King of Malaysia, State Sultans and Rulers, and the Yang di-Pertua Negeri (State Governors)
- During all forms of official visits within the country or in foreign countries with a hot climate
- As an escort or accompanying guests during a visit

The bush jacket was introduced by the British Army in the early 1900s to replace the coloured regimental uniforms, such as the red and blue coats. Commonwealth forces stationed in Malaya adopted the khaki drill bush jacket for service in tropical climates. Until 1940, the bush jacket also served as a combat uniform, as there was no specific attire designated for field operations.

By the late 1930s, the British introduced the jungle green bush jacket for troops stationed in the Far East. However, as the Second World War progressed, supply shortages meant that not all personnel received the jungle green version, and many continued to wear the khaki variant. In 1940, the British Army introduced the 1937 Pattern Battledress as its standard combat and working uniform. Troops stationed in Malaya, including the Malay Regiment, received a tropical variant made of lightweight wool in a brown or cocoa shade. However, due to the climate, most personnel continued to wear the khaki drill bush jacket for everyday and field duties. After the war, in 1950, the British Army introduced the Bush Jacket, Green, 1950 Pattern for use by Commonwealth forces in the Far East, replacing the earlier khaki drill version. The Malaysian Army continued using the 1950 Pattern after independence.

From the 1970s onwards, the Malaysian Army replaced the khaki bush jacket with a dark green version inspired by the United States Army's green Class A service uniform. In the early 2000s, the shade was changed to palm green. This design has remained in use to the present day, with only minor modifications, such as the discontinuation of the Sam Browne belt. The No. 2 uniform is worn with a beret, army formation insignia, and a red cord lanyard. The red lanyard, traditionally worn with the No. 2 uniform, is widely believed to commemorate the Australian Army infantry units stationed in Malaya during the Malayan Emergency. Before 1980, the red lanyard served as the distinguishing mark of the infantry, and only infantry personnel were authorised to wear it. In 1980, the Malaysian Army introduced a large red aiguillette to be worn by all officers, symbolising the army's historical links to the British Army's red coats.

Malaysian Army No. 2 Dress (Bush jacket)
The No. 2 Dress of the Malaysian Army. This uniform is restricted to Warrant Officer Class 2 and above. The rifle green beret shown in this image indicates the wearer belongs to the Infantry Corps, Intelligence Corps, or General Staff.

=== No. 3: Working dress ===
The No. 3 Dress serves as the standard office attire for army personnel and is worn during daily duties, including administrative and routine tasks that do not involve training or operational activities. A slightly modified version of this attire, sometimes designated as the No. 3A Drill Dress, is used for foot drill purposes, replacing the now-obsolete No. 4A Dress.

In addition to the general office version, several variations of the No. 3 Dress exist to suit different specialities within the Malaysian Army. These include overalls for technical personnel, chef uniforms for catering staff, and medical scrubs for healthcare personnel. Each variant is tailored to meet the functional requirements of the respective trade or corps.

In its standard form, the No. 3 Dress is worn with a regimental stable belt, reflecting the wearer's corps or regimental affiliation. During drills, the stable belt is replaced with an olive pistol belt, and personnel wear drill boots with their trousers neatly tucked in to maintain a smart and uniform appearance.

Malaysian Army No. 3 Dress
No. 3 Dress of the Malaysian Army is the generic working dress for personnel inside their bases. The stable belt identifies the wearer's unit; this image shows the belt of the Royal Malay Regiment.

The No. 3A Dress of the Malaysian Army is a variation of the No. 3 Dress, worn only for drill and marching duties. The rifle green beret with a black hackle shown in this image indicates the wearer belongs to the Royal Ranger Regiment.
Gallery of the Malaysian Army No. 3 Working dress
Malaysian Army dentist Captain (Dr) Hetal Ashvin Kumar, wearing medical scrubs, performing a dental cleaning on a patient.

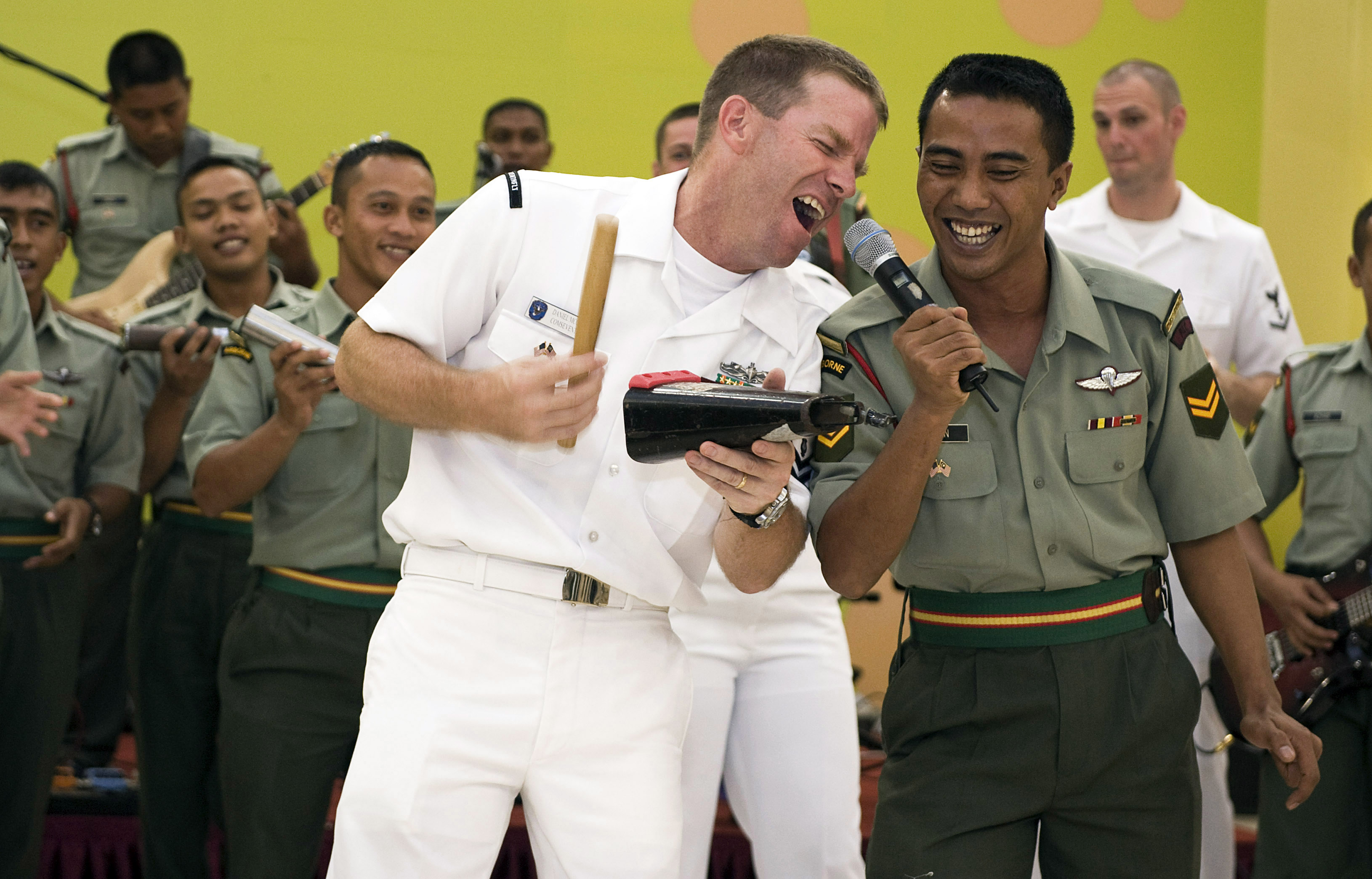
A U.S. Navy musician singing with a Malaysian Army corporal during the Cooperation Afloat Readiness and Training (CARAT) exercise. The corporal is seen wearing the No. 3 Dress with the Royal Malay Regiment stable belt.

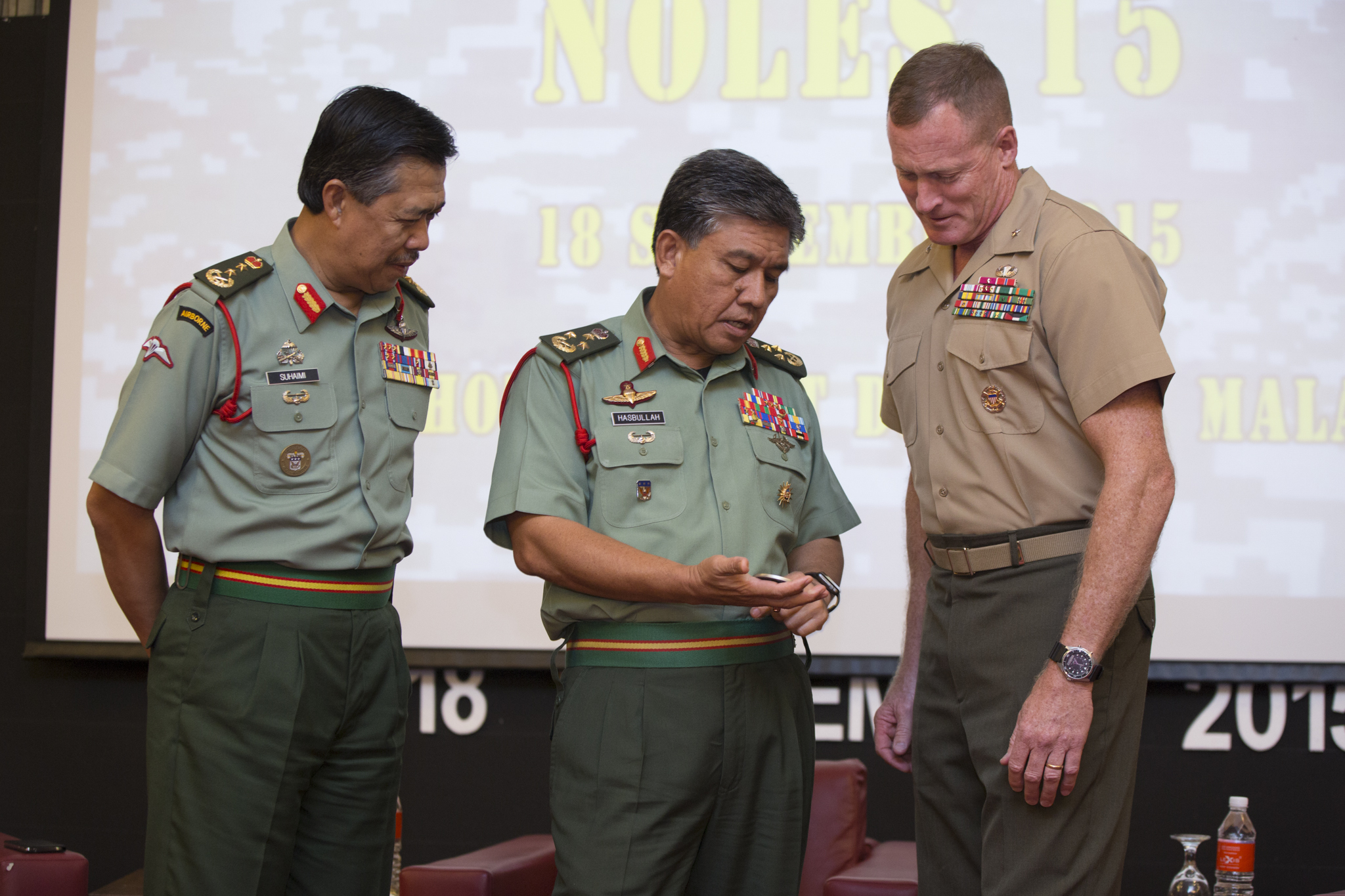
Ahmad Hasbullah Mohd Nawawi, then the Deputy Chief of Army, pictured with a U.S. Marine Corps brigadier general and another Malaysian Army general. Both Malaysian generals are seen wearing the No. 3 Working Dress with the Royal Malay Regiment stable belt. Officers of lieutenant colonel rank and above wear red gorget patches on the collar.

=== No. 5: Camouflage uniform ===
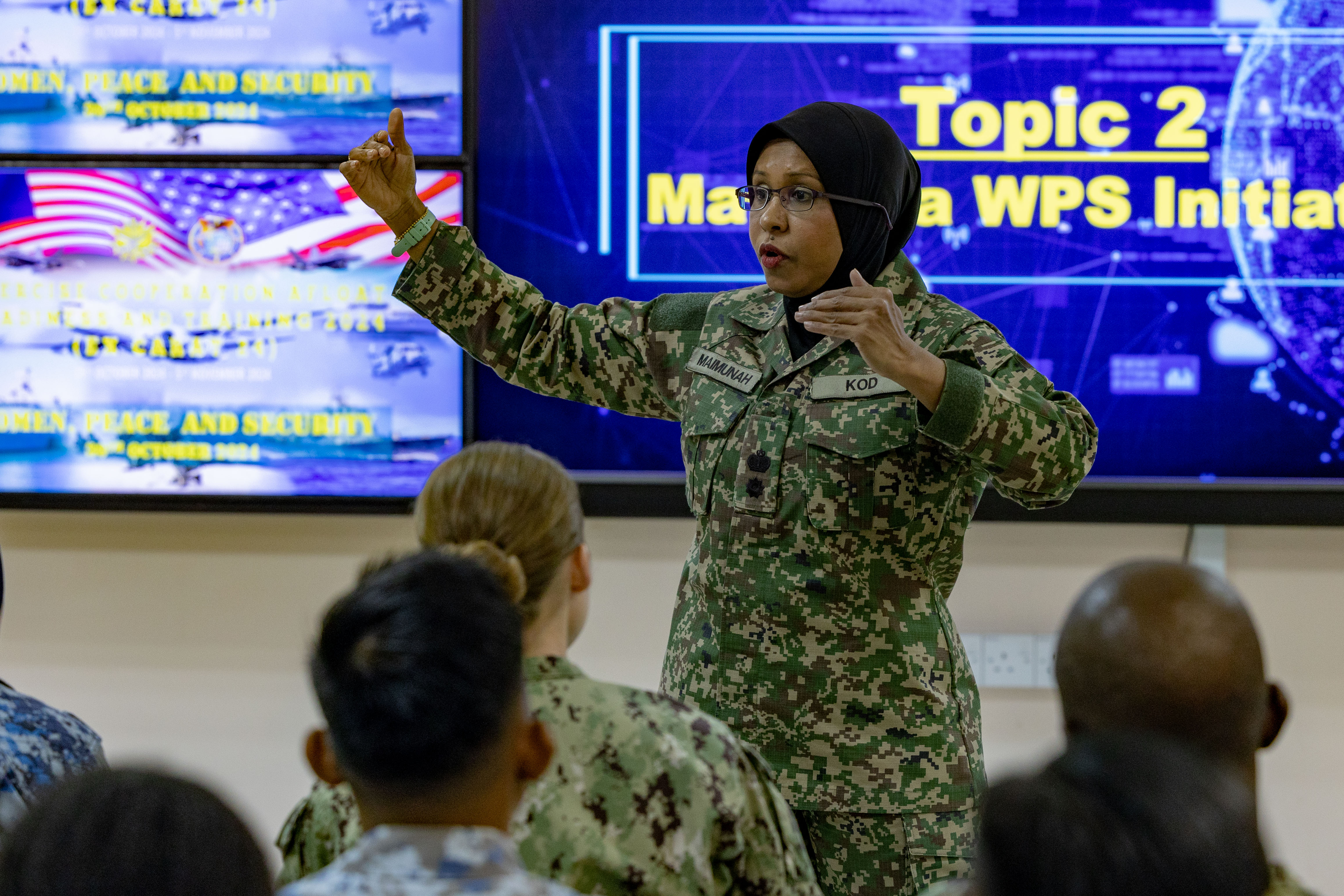
A Malaysian Army lieutenant colonel, serving as a lecturer at the Malaysian Institute of Defence and Security, delivering a lecture during the 2024 CARAT exercise. She is seen wearing the No. 5 Dress while conducting the session.

The No. 5 Dress serves as a complement to the No. 3 Working Dress and is worn during training and operational duties. It is also used by army medical personnel on duty in military hospitals when medical scrubs are not worn.

The digital camouflage pattern currently in use was publicly unveiled at the 80th Malaysian Armed Forces Day parade on 21 September 2013. Before its formal adoption, the pattern underwent field trials during the late 2000s among selected infantry and special operations units to test concealment performance across Malaysia's tropical terrain in jungle, rural, and urban environments.

This digital pattern replaced the long-serving Tiger Stripe (Malay: Celoreng Harimau Belang) camouflage, which had been in service since 1994. The new design incorporates a pixelated layout utilising shades of green, brown, beige, and black, intended to provide improved concealment in dense vegetation and mixed terrain.

The pattern was designed by the Defence Science and Technology Research Institute (STRIDE; Malay: Institut Penyelidikan Sains dan Teknologi Pertahanan), a civilian research institute operating under the Ministry of Defence. Although originally intended for use by riverine-based Royal Malaysian Navy vessels, it was subsequently adopted by the Malaysian Army following research by STRIDE which demonstrated that the pattern offered improved concealment against the infrared cameras and detection radar systems prevalent at that time.

Malaysian Army No. 5 Dress (Camouflage)
The No. 5 Dress serves as the alternative working dress for army personnel when they are not wearing the No. 3 Dress. This uniform features a camouflage pattern, similar to combat uniforms.

=== No. 6: Mess dress ===
The No. 6 Dress, also known in Malaysia as the Mess Kit, is the formal evening attire worn by Malaysian Army personnel from the rank of General to Warrant Officer Class 1. Under current regulations, the aiguillette is no longer worn by warrant officers. The Malaysian Army's mess kit is standardised across all corps and regiments, unlike in the British Army, where each regiment maintains its own distinctive design. In Malaysia, only badges and minor insignia vary according to the wearer's corps or unit.

The mess kit is compulsory on formal occasions such as regimental dinners and beating retreat ceremonies.

The origins of the mess dress date back to 1748, when the Royal Navy issued uniform regulations that formalised officers' dress standards. By the early nineteenth century, British Army officers began wearing shortened shell jackets for informal evening functions such as dinners and balls. These jackets were less rigid than full dress uniforms and often made in bright colours of the wearer's choosing. The style gradually evolved into the modern mess jacket.

The United States Army formally adopted the mess jacket in 1902, making it an official part of its officers' dress regulations. Similar traditions were subsequently maintained by the Royal Navy and the British Army, later spreading throughout the Commonwealth after the Second World War. The Malaysian Armed Forces continued this practice after independence, incorporating it into their own dress regulations.

The Malaysian Army's Mess Kit shares stylistic similarities with the United States Marine Corps Evening Dress "B", featuring a white cavalry-style jacket, a white dress shirt, a red sash-style cummerbund, and dark green trousers with a gold side stripe.

Malaysian Army No. 6 Dress (Mess Kit)
The No. 6 Dress, alternatively known as the "Mess Kit", is the formal evening attire of the Malaysian Army. It is worn by personnel from the rank of General down to Warrant Officer Class 1.

=== No. 7: National attire ===
The No. 7 Dress is the national attire of Malaysia, worn by Malaysian Army personnel on several official occasions, including:

- Formal religious events
- Friday prayers
- Ceremonial prayer activities
- On other occasions as directed by higher authority

For male personnel of all ranks, it consists of a black baju melayu paired with a black and gold songket samping. This uniform was formally introduced in 2012 to standardise the dress across the army. Prior to its introduction, personnel were permitted to wear baju melayu and samping in various colours of their choice.

For female personnel, the No. 7 Dress consists of the traditional baju kurung, similar to that used in the No. 9 Dress, for Muslim women typically accompanied by a black tudung when worn during religious occasions.

=== No. 8: Service dress ===
The No. 8 Dress is the formal service uniform of the Malaysian Army, worn by personnel from General to Warrant Officer Class 1 on several official occasions, including:

- While on duty or attending courses overseas
- When undertaking official visits abroad
- When serving as an escort officer or honorary aide-de-camp to visiting heads of state
- When receiving visits from senior state dignitaries or high-ranking foreign military officers
- On other occasions as directed by higher authority

This uniform exists in two variants: one suited for tropical or hot climates and another for cold climates. While both share a similar design, they differ significantly in their materials. The version intended for cold weather employs sheep wool as its primary fabric, whereas the other variant is manufactured from a polyester-viscose blend.

This uniform replaced the khaki service dress previously used by most Commonwealth nations, a process that began in the mid-1970s and continued gradually until the 1990s. The original uniform was produced in a dark green shade similar to the songkok, but in the early 2000s the colour was changed to palm green to match the No. 2 bush jacket uniform.

Malaysian Army No. 8 Dress (Service dress)
The No. 8 Dress is the generic service dress of the Malaysian Army. This uniform is worn only by Warrant Officer Class 2 and above.

=== No. 9: "Planters' order" and "black tie" attire ===
The No. 9 Dress, also known as the Planters' Order or Black Tie attire, is a smart-casual uniform worn by army personnel from General to Warrant Officer Class 1 when off duty or when leaving the military base. For female personnel, the No. 9 attire consists of the standard traditional baju kurung in any colour, although modern, tightly tailored versions are not permitted. For male personnel of the rank of lieutenant colonel and above, the attire consists of a white long-sleeved shirt worn with a tie of any colour and black trousers. Majors to Warrant Officers Class 1 wear the standard army red tie instead. In earlier decades, shorts were occasionally worn for informal occasions. This attire is also used by recruits, who wear a black tie when leaving the military base during their time off.

The term Planters' Order originated during the colonial period in Malaya, when British planters and officers adopted a semi-formal style of dress suited to the tropical climate. This style was later adopted by military personnel as appropriate off-duty attire. The No. 9 attire is regarded as the successor to the walking-out dress worn by British forces since the Victorian era, which served to ensure that soldiers maintained a smart appearance and upheld the reputation of their regiment while off duty.

=== No. 10: Miscellaneous attires ===
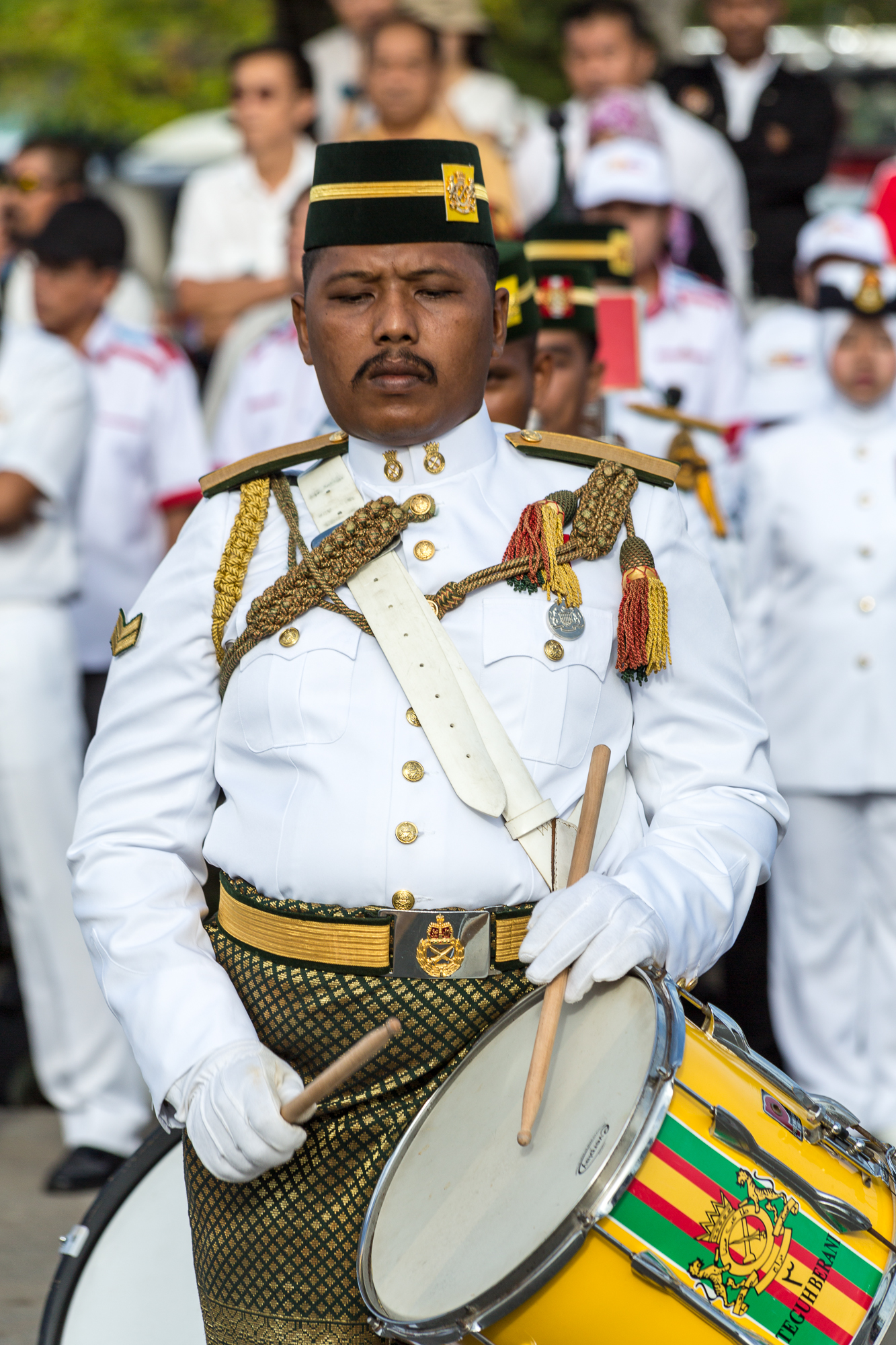
A drummer from the Central Band of the Royal Malay Regiment wearing the No. 10E Dress during Merdeka Day.

The No. 10 Dress comprises a range of miscellaneous attire worn by army personnel. It currently includes at least five sub-categories, the most common of which is the physical training uniform, as it is the most frequently worn. Other variations of the No. 10 Dress exist, each tailored to specific roles or specialisations within the army. The subcategories are as follows:

Malaysian Army No. 10 Dress (Miscellaneous attires)
The No. 10C Dress is the flight overall of the Malaysian Army. It is primarily worn by pilots and aircrew from the Malaysian Army Aviation corps.

The Jungle Green No. 10D Dress is the generic overall of the Malaysian Army. This uniform is primarily worn by army personnel, regardless of rank, who work with armoured vehicles.

The Black No. 10D Dress is a variant of the overall uniform in the Malaysian Army. This specific variant is reserved only for officers who work with armoured vehicles.

==== No. 10A: Physical training uniform ====
The No. 10A Dress is a type of physical training uniform worn by personnel of the Malaysian Army on various official occasions, including:

- Morning and afternoon physical training
- Sports activities
- Recreational and leisure events
- Other occasions as directed by higher authority

Army personnel are typically issued with three sets of No. 10A Dress: a generic Malaysian Army jacket, a Corps or Regiment jacket, and a formation jacket. The generic Malaysian Army version features a red jacket design, while the other two sets vary in colour according to the identities of their respective corps, regiments, or formations.

==== No. 10B: Physical training instructor uniform ====
The No. 10B Dress is a type of physical training uniform worn by army personnel who have qualified from the Physical Training Instructor (PTI) course. These personnel are responsible for conducting and supervising physical training and combat fitness exercises at all levels within the Malaysian Army.

There are two variations of this uniform: a general all-white version and a field or combat variation in which camouflage trousers are worn. For male PTIs, the uniform consists of a sleeveless white and red PTI shirt, while female PTIs wear a long-sleeved version. PTI supervisors wear shirts distinguished by red sleeves; male supervisors wear a short-sleeved version, while female supervisors wear a long-sleeved version in full red sleeves.

==== No. 10C: Flight suit ====
The No. 10C Dress is an overall worn by army personnel who are trained as aircraft pilots and aircrew during flight operations or while on standby. The uniform is olive green in colour, and a similar design is used across all branches of the Malaysian Armed Forces for their respective pilots and aircrew.

==== No. 10D: Tank overalls ====
The No. 10D Dress is an overall worn by army personnel who are trained as armoured vehicle commanders and crew members. There are two variations of this uniform: an all-black version worn exclusively by officers and an olive-coloured version worn by both officers and crew.

==== No. 10E: Marching band ceremonial dress ====
The No. 10E Dress is a ceremonial uniform similar in design to the No. 1 Dress, but it is worn exclusively by bandsmen and women of the military bands of the Malaysian Army, as well as the Training Band of the Malaysian Army School of Military Music. This uniform features additional accessories and is heavier than the No. 1 Dress worn by other army personnel. While the songkok or peaked cap is worn by men, women wear the crusher cap.

== Combat uniforms ==
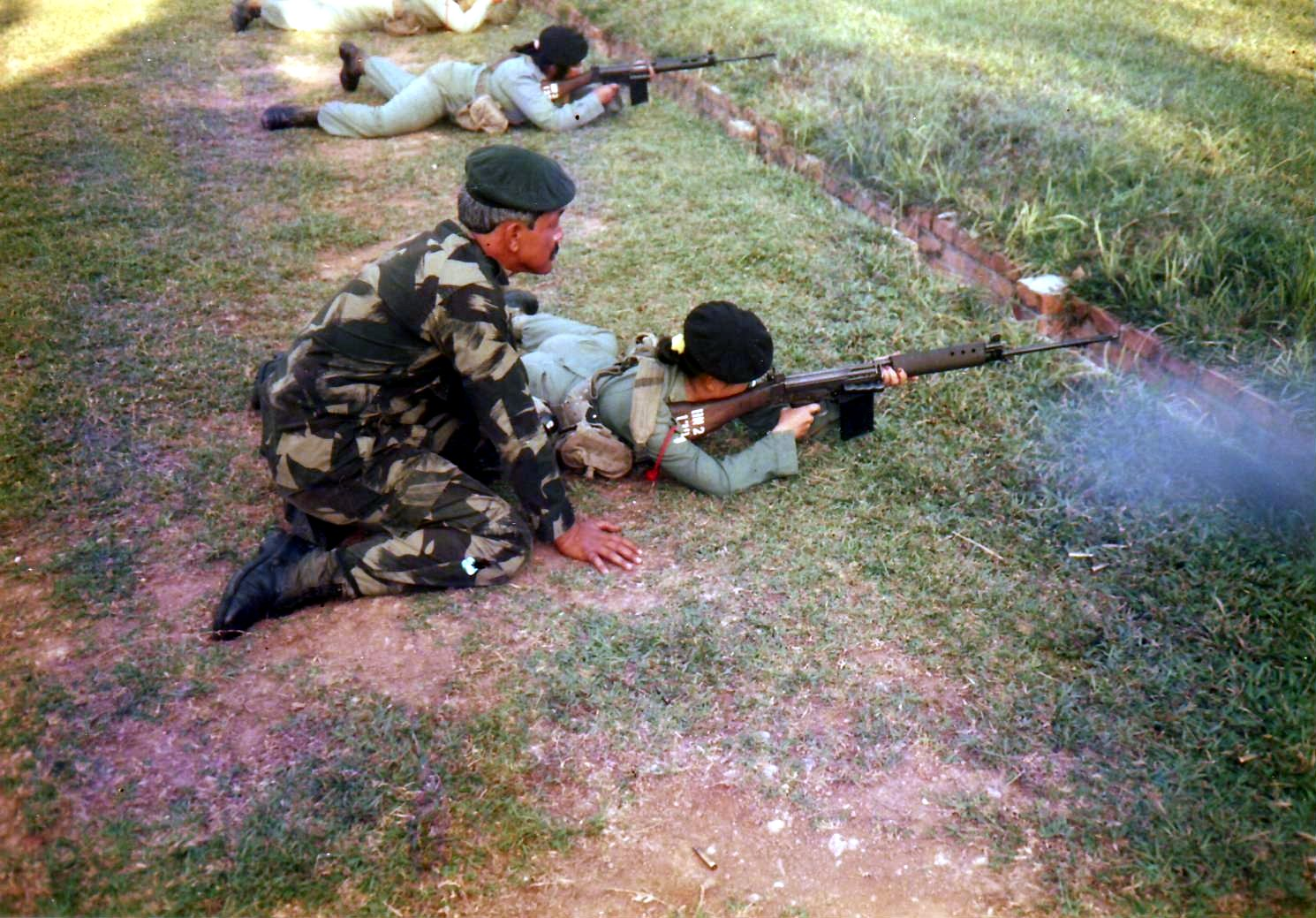
A female reservist of the Territorial Army with an L1A1 SLR, c. 1990s. Notably, she is wearing a Jungle green combat uniform while her instructor is dressed in the newer Brushstroke camouflage combat attire.

The combat uniforms (Malay: pakaian tempur) are the operational dress worn by personnel of the Malaysian Army during tactical and field operations. Unlike the numbered dress orders, combat uniforms are not formally classified by order, as their style varies depending on mission type. They range from camouflage battledress to civilian attire (pakaian preman) for covert or special operations. The green camouflage uniform has become a distinctive feature of the Malaysian Army.

The history of modern combat uniforms in Malaysia began in 1940 with the introduction of the 1937 Pattern Battledress, used by British forces stationed in Malaya. A local variant in cocoa brown was issued for the tropical climate. During the Malayan Emergency, the Commonwealth forces adopted the jungle green combat uniform, replacing the older battle dress.

In 1969, the Malaysian Army introduced its first camouflage pattern, known as the Brushstroke, inspired by the 1950s British design and adapted for tropical conditions. This pattern remained in service until 1994, when it was replaced by the Harimau Belang (Tiger Stripe) pattern. Between 1993 and 1994, a short-lived Harimau Kumbang (Leopard) camouflage design based on the United States Army's Woodland pattern was also introduced. However, it was discontinued after the pattern was found to fade quickly after several washes. Although used briefly by several army units, it was soon replaced by the more durable and effective Tiger Stripe pattern. The Tiger Stripe design subsequently became the standard camouflage for most army units, although certain elite formations continued to use variations of earlier designs.

In 2013, a new digital camouflage was officially introduced, replacing the Tiger Stripe pattern as the standard Malaysian Army combat uniform. The design was developed through the cooperation of the Malaysian Army and the Defence Science and Technology Research Institute (STRIDE; Malay: Institut Penyelidikan Sains dan Teknologi Pertahanan), a civilian research institute under the Ministry of Defence, to improve concealment in jungle, urban, and mixed environments. Although originally intended for use by riverine-based Royal Malaysian Navy vessels, it was subsequently adopted by the Malaysian Army following research by STRIDE which demonstrated that the pattern offered improved concealment against the infrared cameras and detection radar systems prevalent at that time.

In August 2025, the MultiCam pattern was officially adopted by special forces personnel of the 21st Special Service Group (21 SSG). The transition was carried out in phases, and personnel of the 21 SSG currently wear both the digital camouflage and MultiCam patterns.

Malaysian Army's combat uniforms patterns
Name	Pattern	Year	Notes
Jungle green		1937–1990s	This pattern was a continuation of the British tropical uniform. It was used as the standard combat uniform by regular army personnel until 1969 and continued to be worn by army reservists until the 1990s.
Brushstroke		1969–1994	This pattern was influenced by the brushstroke pattern utilised by certain Commonwealth armies during the 1950s, such as the British and South African forces.
Harimau Kumbang (Leopard's pattern)		1993–1994	This pattern was introduced in 1993, although only a small number of units were issued with it. It was discontinued in 1994; this short operational lifespan was attributed to the fact that it was printed on a green base fabric. After a few washes, the pattern would begin to fade, resulting in an appearance dominated by the colour green.
Harimau Belang (Tiger Stripe's pattern)		1994–2013	This pattern constitutes an updated version of the Harimau Kumbang camouflage. Many Malaysians consider it to be the most visually appealing pattern adopted by the Malaysian Armed Forces, and it has subsequently been adopted by the ground elements of both the Royal Malaysian Navy and the Royal Malaysian Air Force.
Harimau Belang (Desert)		1994–2013	This is the desert variant of the Harimau Belang pattern. It has been employed by the Malaysian Armed Forces during operations conducted in desert environments.
Digital camouflage (Tropical)		2013–present	This pattern was introduced in 2013 to improve army personnel concealment in jungle, swamp, urban, and mixed environments. Based on STRIDE's research, the pattern offered improved concealment against the infrared cameras and detection radar systems prevalent at that time.
Digital camouflage (Desert)		2013–present	This is the desert variant of the digital camouflage pattern. It has been employed by the Malaysian Armed Forces during operations conducted in desert environments.
MultiCam		2025–present	This pattern is utilised by the special forces personnel of the 21st Special Service Group. Its adoption by the special forces was due to its effectiveness across mixed environments, including jungle, urban, and desert settings.

Malaysian Army combat uniforms
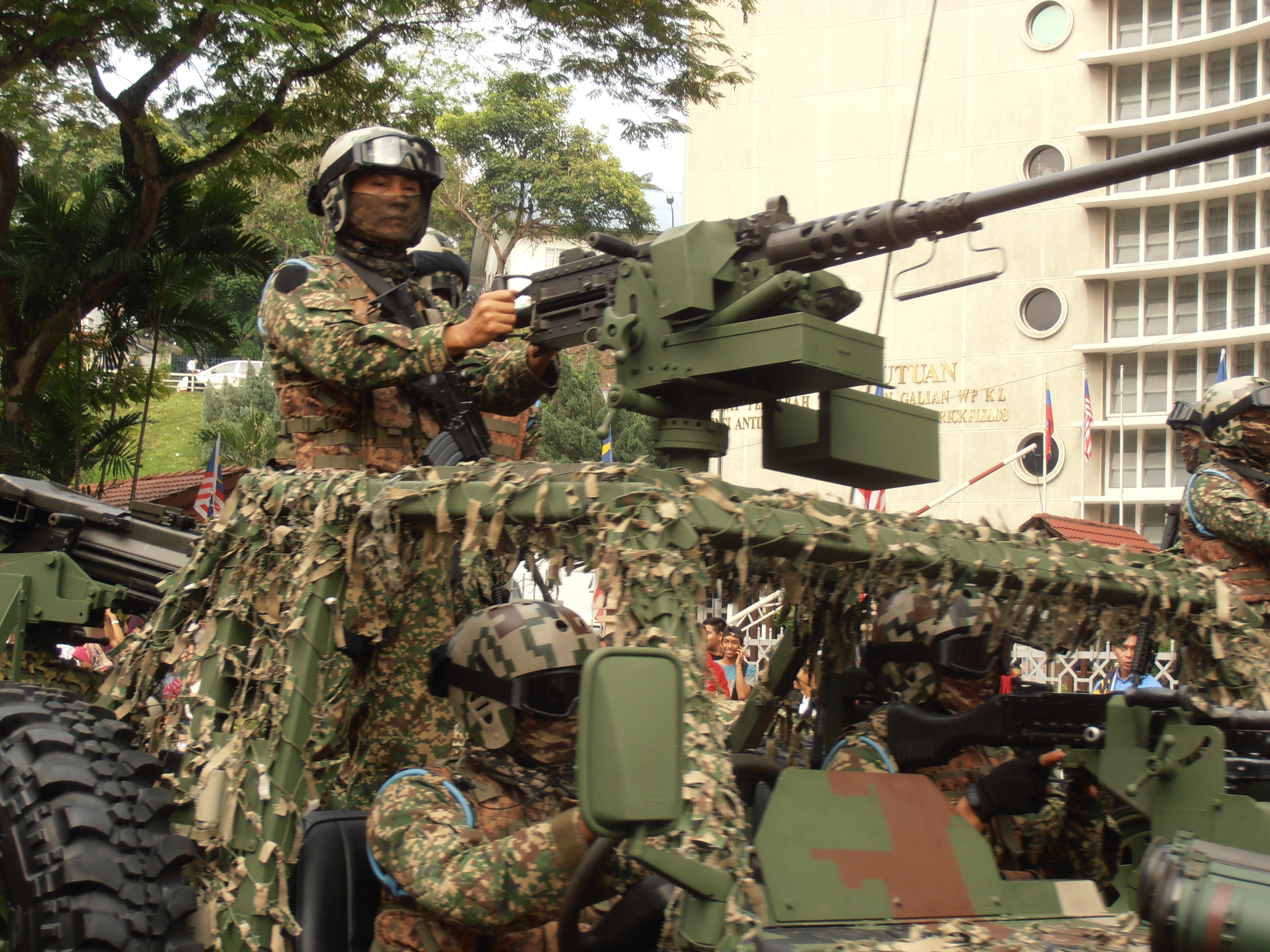
A small patrol unit from the Gerak Khas, the Malaysian Army Special Forces, on standby inside their Special Operations Vehicle (SOV) while waiting for their turn during the 2014 Merdeka Day parade. All members are seen wearing digital combat uniforms with Pro-Tec bump helmets.

A Malaysian soldier and a U.S. Marine in full combat uniform during a military exercise in Sabah in 2014. The Malaysian soldier is seen wearing the Tropical Digital camouflage with a PASGT helmet, which has been gradually phased out by the Malaysian Army since 2017.

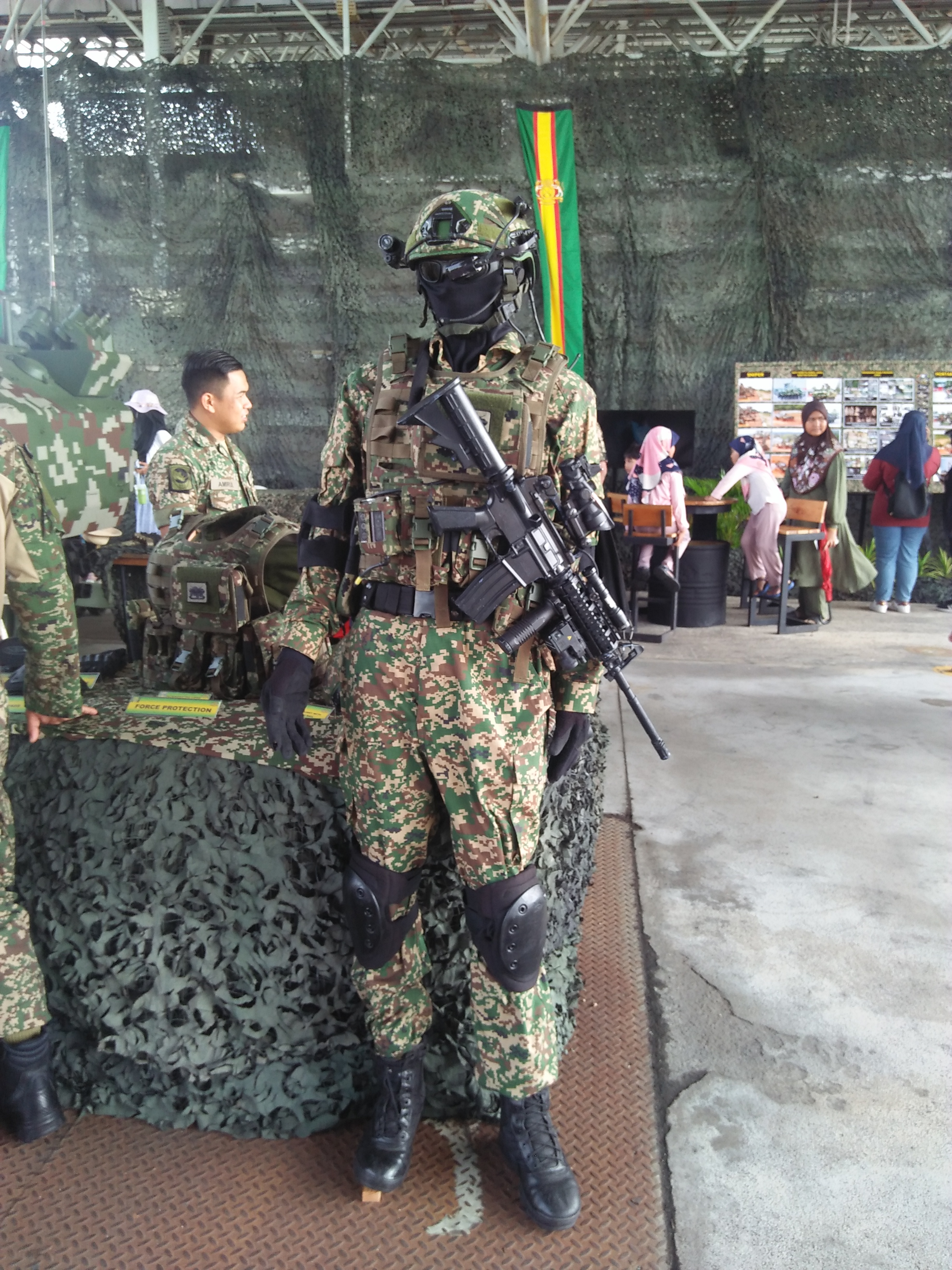
A Malaysian Army combat uniform configured for urban warfare on display. Elbow and knee guards are used to reduce the risk of injury in urban environments.

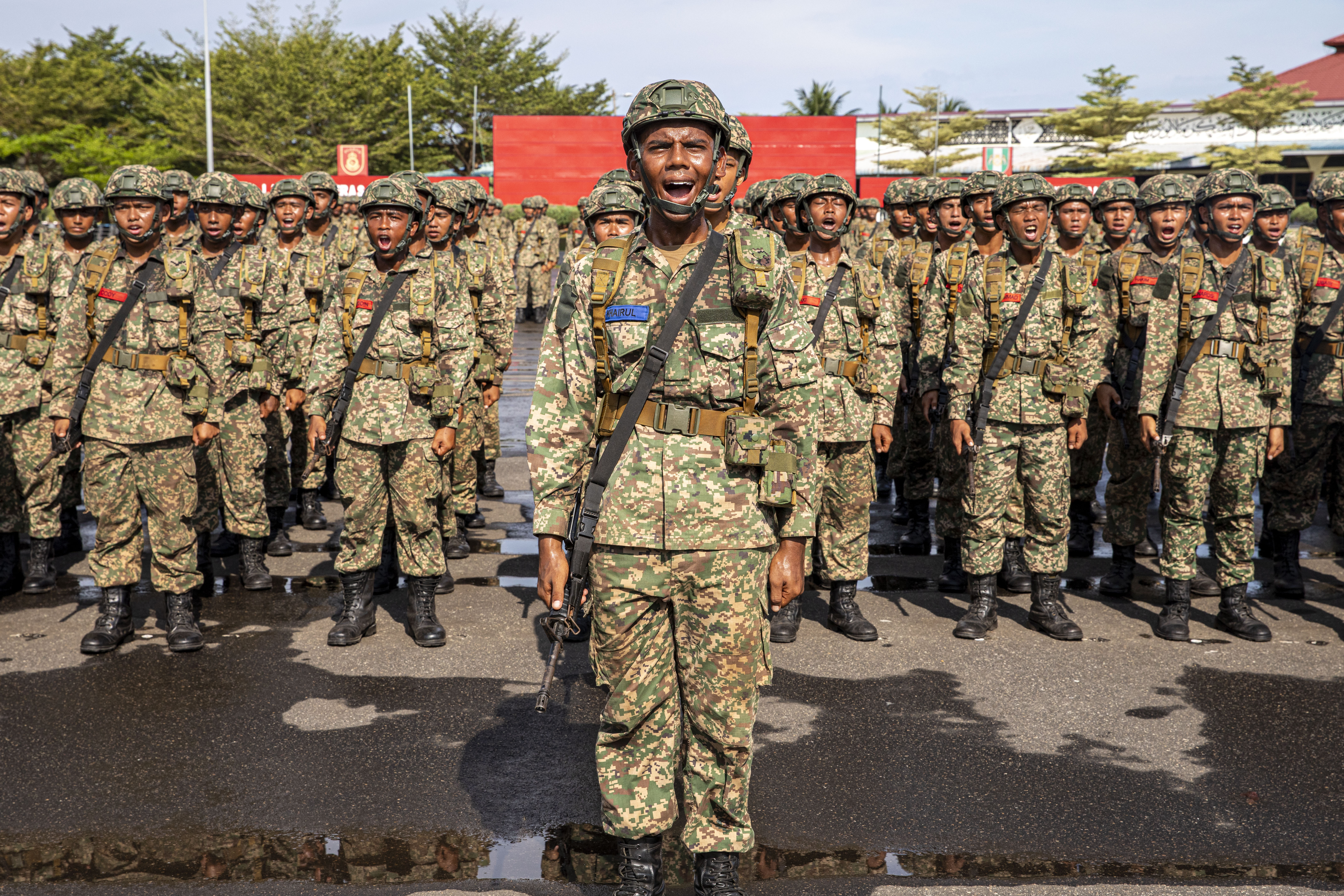
Malaysian Army recruits performing foot drills during boot camp. They are seen wearing the Malaysian Tropical Digital camouflage combat uniform, along with FAST helmets, M4 carbines, and battle harnesses. The Tropical Digital camouflage has been the main pattern used by the Malaysian Army since 2013.

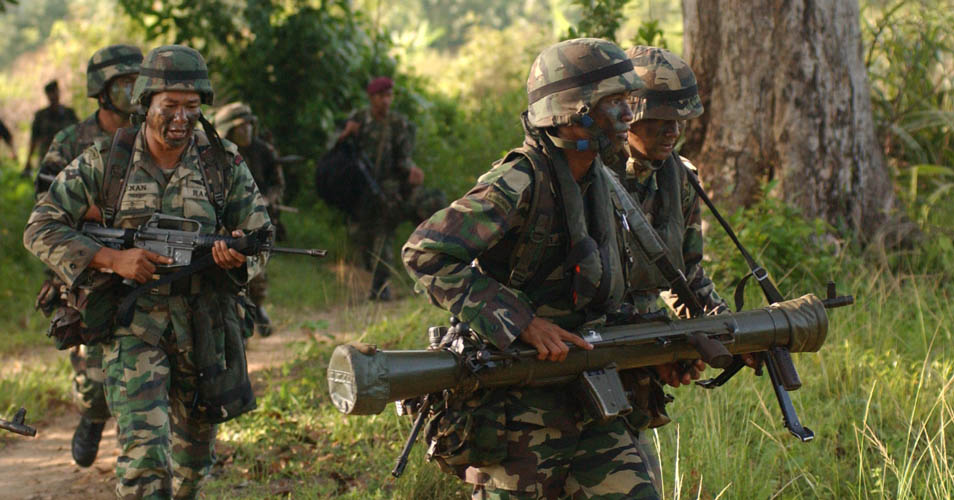
Malaysian Army paratroopers in full combat uniform during a military exercise with the U.S. Marine Corps in 2005. The paratroopers are seen wearing the older tiger-stripe camouflage pattern.

Two female Malaysian Army medical personnel, a paramedic and a dental nurse, standing guard in 2011 while serving in Afghanistan under ISAF. They are wearing the desert version of the tiger-stripe camouflage combat uniform. Malaysian Army medical staff typically rotated between medical duties and guard duties to protect their compounds from enemy threats. This camouflage pattern remained in use until 2013.

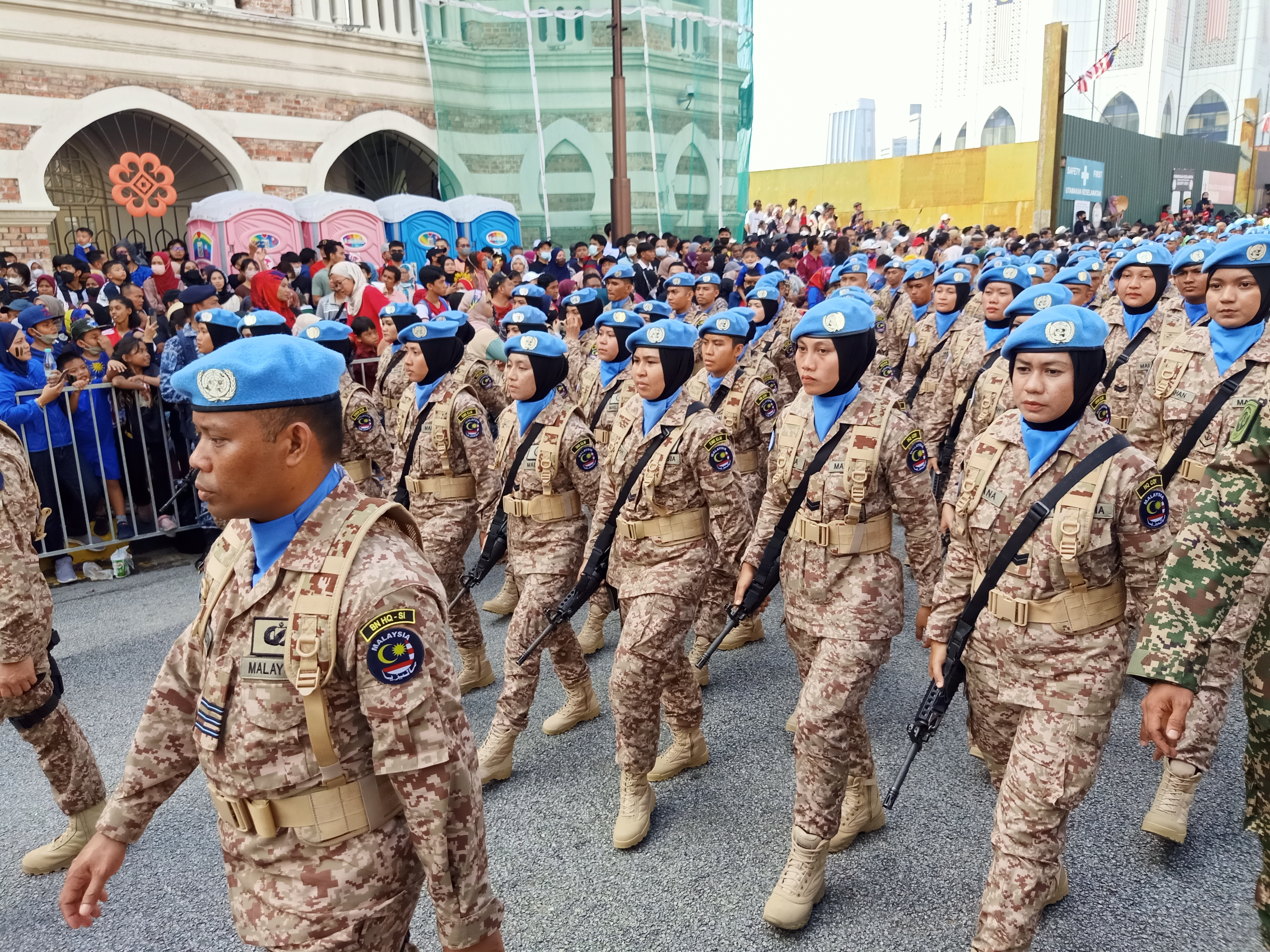
Joint Malaysian Armed Forces personnel attached to United Nations peacekeeping duties marching during Merdeka Day. They are seen wearing UN blue berets with the desert digital camouflage combat uniform, which has been in use since 2013 and remains the current pattern.

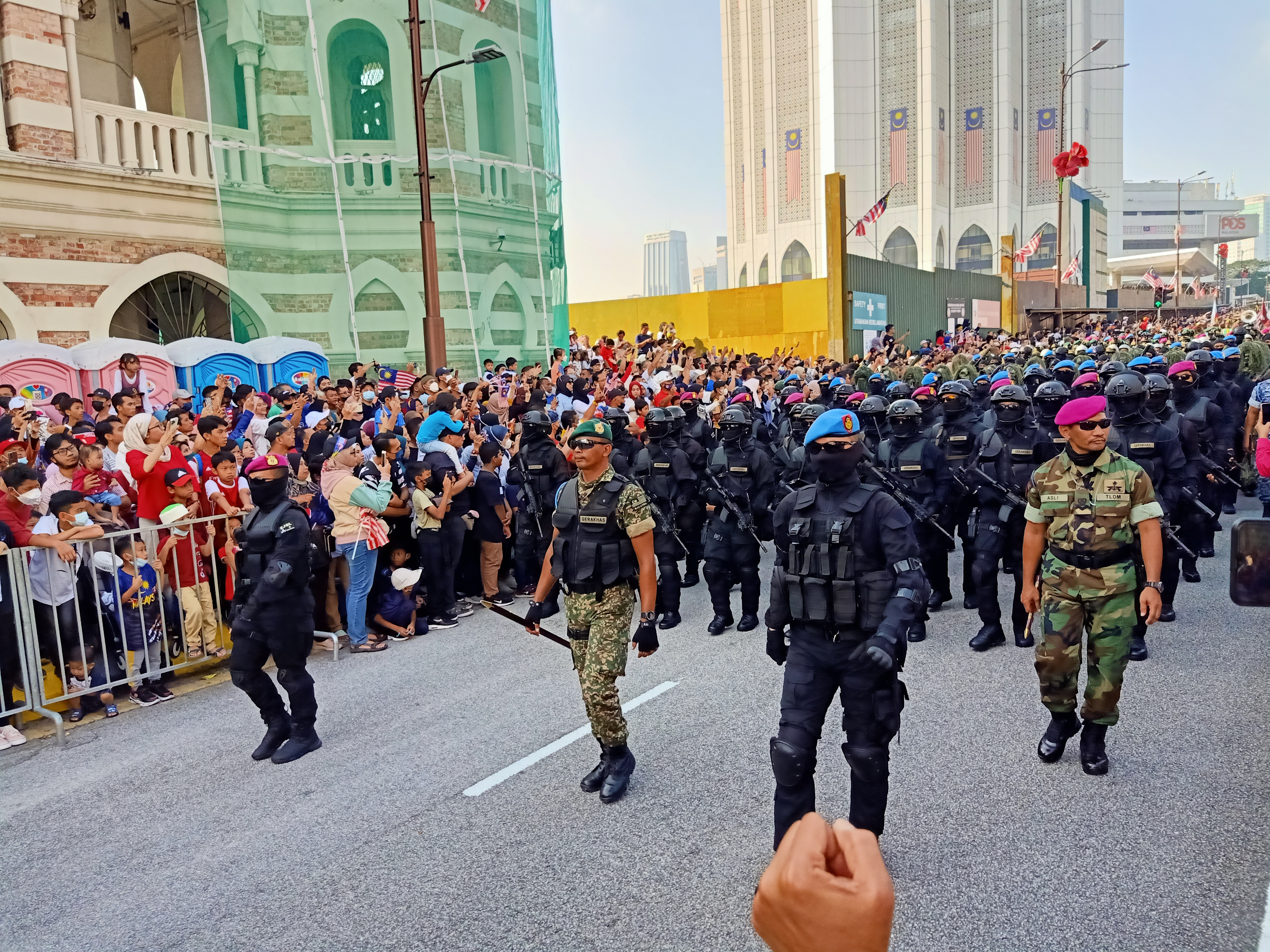
A joint special forces contingent from all three branches of the Malaysian Armed Forces marching during the 65th Merdeka Day parade. The commandos are showcasing various variations of their tactical combat uniforms, which differ according to mission and operational requirements.

== Accessories ==
=== Beret ===
General Raja Mohamed Affandi speaking with U.S. Marine Corps Lieutenant General John Toolan. General Raja Mohamed Affandi is seen wearing the maroon beret of the Rapid Deployment Force, while another Malaysian general is wearing the rifle green infantry beret.

The beret was first introduced in Malaya in 1939 when the 4th Queen's Own Hussars arrived in Singapore, then part of the Straits Settlements. Contemporary reports and photographs published in The Straits Times that year show the regiment marching in black berets, marking the first recorded use of the headdress in the region. As one of the British Army's armoured cavalry regiments, the 4th Hussars had adopted the black beret in 1924, and their presence in Singapore later influenced locally raised armoured units.

Following the war, the Federation Armoured Car Regiment, formed in 1952, adopted the black beret in line with British Royal Armoured Corps tradition. In the early 1960s, the Malaysian Ranger Regiment (now the Royal Ranger Regiment) became the second unit to adopt the beret as part of its uniform. The Rangers selected the rifle-green beret with a hackle, introduced after the regiment's formation in 1963 as a new regimental distinction reflecting their role as light infantry. The colour was inspired by British rifle regiments such as the Royal Green Jackets.

The Malaysian Special Service Unit (MSSU), established in 1965 and later known as Gerak Khas, adopted the Sherwood green beret in 1970 after its members qualified through the Royal Marines Commando Course. During its early years, the MSSU operated as a composite task force, and personnel initially retained the headdress of their parent units. Standardisation was implemented in 1970, when all commando-trained personnel were authorised to wear the green beret as part of their official uniform.

The adoption of the Gerak Khas beret marked a turning point for the Malaysian Army, leading to the widespread introduction of the beret across corps and regiments throughout the 1970s. Each corps selected beret colours that reflected its historical traditions and functions, while the Malaysian Rangers standardised their hackle to black in 1975, replacing the earlier practice where the colour varied between battalions.

==== Current beret colours in the Malaysian Army ====
The current beret colours used by the Malaysian Army are as follows:

Beret	Corps/Regiments/formations
Black beret	Royal Armoured Corps
Rifle-green beret	Infantry Corps (Royal Malay Regiment, Royal Ranger Regiment and Border Regiment) and the Royal Intelligence Corps
Chilli-red beret	Royal Military Police Corps
Army-blue beret	Corps of Royal Electrical and Mechanical Engineers, General Service Corps, Military Chaplain Corps, Royal Army Engineers Regiment, Royal Artillery Regiment, Royal Logistic Corps, Royal Medical Corps, Royal Ordnance Corps, Royal Signal Regiment and Territorial Army
Blue-grey beret	Malaysian Army Aviation
Sherwood-green beret	For army personnel attached to the 21st Special Service Group or those who have passed the Malaysian Special Forces selection
Maroon beret	For army personnel who have passed the Rapid Deployment Force pipeline (Malaysian Army's special operations infantry)
Light-blue	For army personnel attached to the United Nations peacekeeping force role

=== Lanyard ===
The lanyard is an accessory worn on the shoulder of certain military uniforms. The Malay Regiment has used a lanyard since its formation in 1933, adopting a rifle-green cord-style lanyard to signify its identity as a light infantry unit within the British Army.

On 15 August 1957, the 1st Field Battery, Federation Army, was established in Kajang with 89 gunners drawn from the British 1st Singapore Artillery Regiment, Royal Artillery. This unit later evolved into the Royal Artillery Regiment (Malay: Rejimen Artileri Diraja). Following the traditions of the British Royal Artillery, its personnel wore an army-blue cord-style lanyard, a custom derived from the blue coats of the early nineteenth century and regarded as a symbol of the Royal Artillery.

In May 1965, personnel of the Malaysian Army and the Royal Malaysian Navy who completed the Basic Commando Course conducted by 40 Commando, Royal Marines, were awarded a commando-green beret, a Caribbean-blue (light blue) lanyard, and a Fairbairn–Sykes fighting knife. The light blue lanyard, reflecting the traditions of 40 Commando and the Royal Marines' historical association with the Caribbean, continues to be worn by certain Malaysian Special Forces units.

In 1970, personnel attached to the Unit's Combat Intelligence Squad (UCIS; Malay: Pasukan Risek Gempor), the special reconnaissance and combat intelligence team of infantry battalions, began wearing a red cord-style lanyard inspired by the Australian Army Infantry red lanyard. The lanyard was worn with both working dress and combat uniforms by the squad until it was disbanded in 1999.

During the 1980s, the rifle-green and army-blue lanyards were gradually phased out, and the Malaysian Army issued a red braided lanyard to officers. Army Special Forces units adopted a dual-lanyard system, wearing the red lanyard on the right shoulder and the Caribbean-blue lanyard on the left. In the 1990s, the red braided lanyard was replaced by a smaller cord-style red lanyard, which remains in use today.

=== Peak cap ===
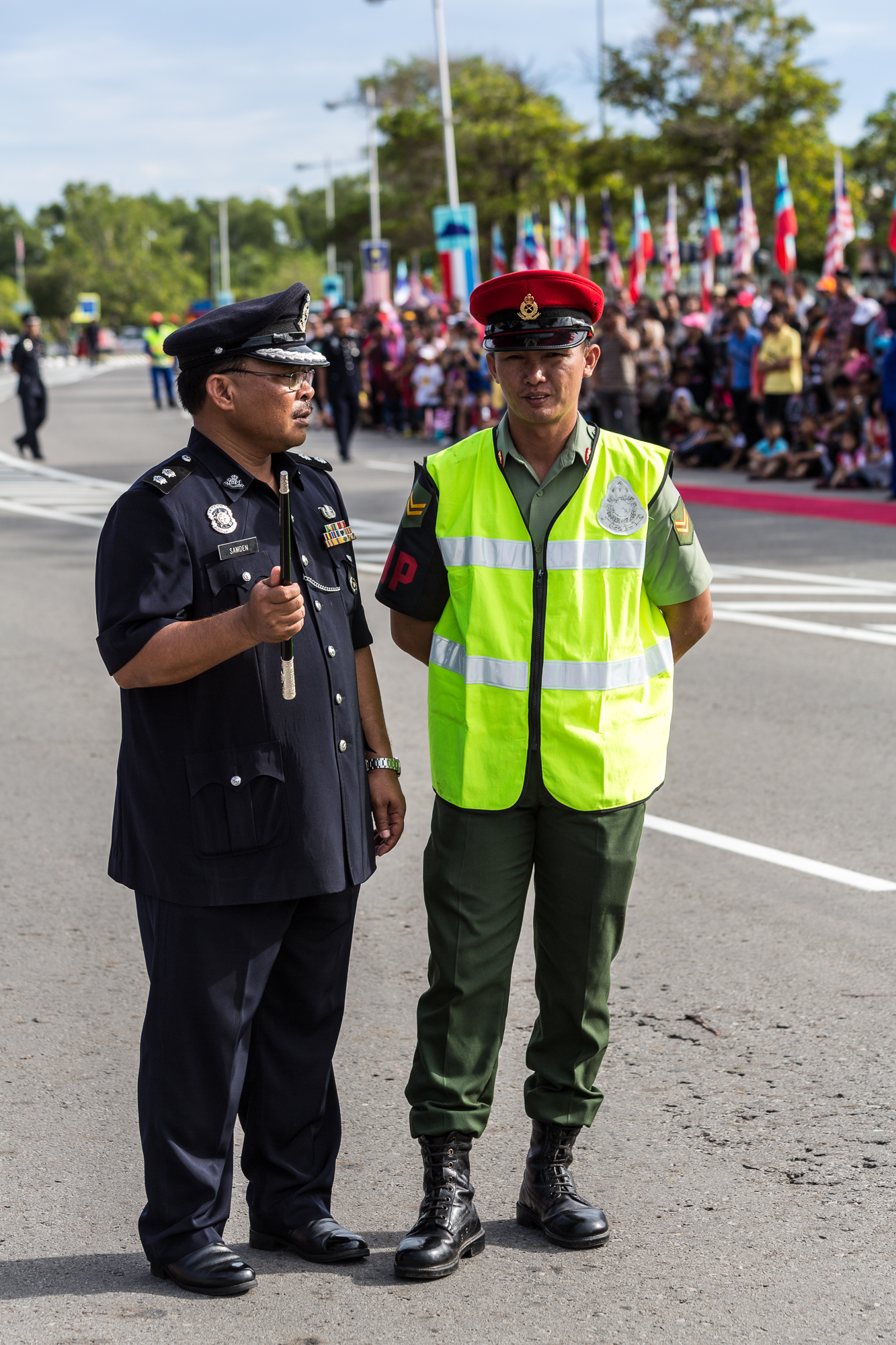
Two law enforcers from the Royal Malaysian Police and the Royal Military Police Corps on duty during the Merdeka Day parade. The soldier from the Royal Military Police Corps is seen wearing a red peak cap.

The peaked cap was first introduced by the Royal Navy in the 1820s and was adopted by British Army officers in the 1850s for undress wear, while other ranks commonly wore the pillbox or forage cap. This tradition continues in the Malaysian Army, where the peaked cap is worn exclusively by officers and warrant officers.

The Royal Armoured Corps and the Royal Military Police Corps also use the peaked cap as part of their No. 1 Ceremonial Uniform, distinguishing them from other corps and formations. The Royal Armoured Corps retains ceremonial traditions influenced by the British Army's cavalry regiments, such as the Hussars. Historically, cavalry service in European armies was associated with social prestige, and this heritage continues to shape the ceremonial customs of armoured units in the Malaysian Army today.

=== Samping ===
The samping is a traditional Malay costume accessory made from fabric, originating from royal court attire during the Malacca Sultanate. Also known as Kain Dagang, it is essentially a shorter variant of the sarong that is widely used across Asia and Africa.

The garment historically functioned as a symbol of status. This ranged from plain samping worn by those of lower rank to highly decorated, intricate versions, usually crafted from songket or tenun fabric, reserved for the Sultan and higher-ranking nobles.

In modern times, the samping is commonly worn by men across society, particularly in Brunei and Malaysia. Within the Malaysian Army, the samping is an accessory worn with the No. 1 dress for other ranks across most corps and regiments.

=== Songkok ===
The songkok is a traditional headdress worn by men throughout Maritime Southeast Asia, typically black in colour. It is believed to have been influenced by the Ottoman fez but developed locally as a distinct Malay form of headwear. By the late nineteenth century, several Malay military and police units had begun using the songkok, possibly as a substitute for the pillbox cap that was common in colonial forces. Most law enforcement and paramilitary organisations adopted a black version, while the Johor Military Forces wore a red variant.

The British-established Malay Regiment adopted a dark green songkok as its official headdress, a colour that remains in use within the Malaysian Army today. During the pre-war period, the regiment also wore a light brown version with yellow trim as part of its service dress. The songkok continues to be part of the Malaysian Army's dress regulations, worn with both the No. 1 Ceremonial Uniform and the No. 3 Working Dress, preserving its long-standing historical and cultural significance.

== Discontinued ==
=== Pillbox cap ===
The pillbox cap was worn by the Malay Regiment from its formation in 1933. Historical records indicate two colour variations used by the regiment during that period. The first version featured a two-tone design, with rifle green on the crown and black on the band. This colour scheme was the reverse of that used by the Gurkhas stationed in Malaya, whose pillbox caps were black on top and rifle green on the lower section. During the same era, the police force in Malaya wore an all-black pillbox cap, while the Johor Military Force adopted an all-red version. Due to its resemblance in shape to the traditional songkok, the pillbox cap was commonly referred to by that name among the local population.

In the 1940s, a new version was introduced for non-commissioned officers of the Malay Regiment, featuring a black body with two red trims, while other ranks wore the light brown slouch hat. The pillbox cap was eventually phased out after the Second World War, replaced by the songkok and, later, the beret.

=== Light brown slouch hat ===
The slouch hat was worn by the Malay Regiment from the early 1940s until 1970 and became one of the regiment's distinctive identifiers alongside the songkok. Its adoption was influenced by the British and Australian forces stationed in Malaya during that period, both of which commonly used the slouch hat as tropical headgear.

The hat was typically worn with the battledress when the Brodie helmet was not in use, serving as both a practical and symbolic piece of regimental attire. It was discontinued in 1970 when the Malaysian Army formally adopted the beret as its primary headdress.

=== Olive terai hat ===
The olive terai hat was worn by the Federation Regiment from 1952 until 1960. It served to distinguish the regiment from the Malay Regiment, which at that time wore a light brown slouch hat. The Federation Regiment's use of the terai hat reflected a practical adaptation for tropical conditions and also gave the regiment a unique identity within the newly established local forces.

In 1960, the Federation Regiment merged with the Federation Armoured Car Regiment to form the Federation Reconnaissance Corps, which later evolved into the Royal Armoured Corps. Following the merger, the new corps adopted the black beret of the Federation Armoured Car Regiment, and the olive terai hat was subsequently discontinued.

=== Khaki uniforms ===
The khaki uniform was used by British and Commonwealth forces stationed in Malaya from the early 1900s and remained in use after Malaysia gained independence from the United Kingdom. This style of uniform was adopted by various uniformed services in Malaysia, including the army, air force, police, and fire service. In the 1970s, the army began transitioning to a green service dress, influenced by the United States Army. However, the khaki service dress continued to be worn in a limited capacity until the late 1980s and early 1990s.

=== Dark green forage cap ===
The forage cap, also known as the side cap or garrison cap, was introduced with the formation of the Federation Regiment in 1952. It became an identifying feature of the regiment and was worn in camp when personnel were not engaged in training or operational duties. Over time, the forage cap was adopted more widely across the Malaysian Army, gradually replacing the songkok as a practical headgear for daily use, although the songkok continued to be worn in ceremonial contexts. The forage cap was phased out during the 1980s, as the beret became the standard headdress of the Malaysian Army.

=== Silk crimson waist sash belt ===
The silk crimson waist sash belt served as an official accessory reserved exclusively for officers of the Malaysian Army, worn with the white ceremonial uniform. This tradition represented a continuation of practices established by the British Armed Forces. It remained in use until around the 1970s, at which point officers ceased wearing the sash with the white ceremonial uniform. This cessation was largely due to religious considerations, as silk is generally forbidden for wear by Muslim men.

=== Red braided shoulder lanyard ===
The red braided shoulder lanyard was standardised across most Malaysian Army units in the early 1980s and worn with the No. 3 and No. 4 Dress. Before its introduction, lanyards were corps-specific: the Infantry wore rifle-green, the Combat Intelligence red, the Artillery army-blue, and the Special Forces Caribbean-blue. Around 1990, the red braided shoulder lanyard was replaced service-wide by a cord-style red lanyard, while members of the Special Forces retained their Caribbean-blue lanyard in accordance with regimental tradition.

=== No. 3B: Working dress (Nurse) ===
The No. 3B Military Nurse Working Dress was an all-white variant of the No. 3 Working dress, worn by Warrant Officers Class 2 and below serving as nurses in military hospitals. In 2018, this uniform was phased out, and all military medical personnel, including doctors and nurses, now wear either the No. 5 Camouflage Uniform or standard medical scrubs while on duty.

=== No. 4: All green uniform ===
The No. 4 uniform was an all-green attire used for daily duties within camp, as well as for marching and parade events. It consisted of two variants, designated as No. 4A, which was specifically used for marching and drill, and No. 4B, which was worn for routine daily tasks. The uniform was gradually phased out beginning in 2012, as it was considered redundant with the No. 3 Working Dress.

== See also ==
- Uniforms of the British Army
- Uniforms of the Australian Army
- Uniforms of the New Zealand Army
- Uniforms of the United States Army
