= Federation Regiment =

- Cap badge of the Federation Regiment
- Active: 1952–1960
- Country: Malaya

The Federation Regiment was an attempt by British General Gerald Templer (1898–1979) to form a multiracial infantry regiment of the Malayan Federation Army.

== History ==
In 1933, the British War Office agreed to the formation of the Malay Regiment as a locally raised regiment of the British Army. Two battalions of the Malay Regiment were raised before the Japanese invasion of Malaya, and both battalions acquitted themselves well during the Battle of Malaya and the subsequent Battle of Singapore.

=== Malayan Emergency ===
After World War II, the Malay Regiment was reformed and by 1948 had a strength of three infantry battalions. With the onset of the Malayan Emergency, the British Administration planned to increase the number of battalions to ten by 1960. However, the planned expansion of the Malay Regiment could not be made at the desired pace, and in 1957 only seven battalions had been raised. Due to the demands placed on the British Army by the Korean War and other commitments, it was imperative to the Malayan Emergency.

=== Federation Regiment formed ===
In July 1952, the Federation Regiment Bill was passed in the Federal Legislative Council. This bill paved the way for the development of the first multiracial infantry unit as desired by General Gerald Templer.

The Malayan Emergency was seen as a war between the British colonists and the Chinese-dominated Malayan Communist Party, with the Malays seemingly supporting the British cause. Hence, it was imperative that the Chinese population be involved in the campaign against the Communists.

Templer had hoped to form a purely Chinese regiment, but his idea was met with hostility by the Malay rulers. They however agreed to his idea to raise at least three multiracial battalions recruited from among the locals in Malaya and mooted the formation of the Federation Regiment with the understanding that each battalion would be balanced by an additional battalion of the Malay Regiment.

By November 1952, the Federation Regiment was able to recruit 434 men, of which only 75 were of Chinese descent, though a large proportion of the Chinese applied to be officers or to join the technical services. By 1957, the Malay Regiment had grown to seven battalions, but the Federation Army was only able to raise a single battalion of the Federation Regiment. The British found it hard to attract non-Malays to join the Federation Regiment, though this problem was also faced by the Malayan Police force.

=== Templer's 12 Superb Men ===
Templer selected a group of young Malayan men to be sent first to Eaton Hall in Chester, and then selected 24 young Malayans to undergo Officer Cadet Training at the Royal Military Academy at Sandhurst for later appointment as officers of the multiracial Federation Regiment. The term 12 Superb Men was coined by the Malayan Press after the publicity associated with the selection of the 13 men and their round Malaya exercise in an attempt to recruit men for the Federation Regiment.

The first 11 men were personally approved by Templer. In the July 27, 1952, Sunday Times, Major General Sir Hugh Stockwell was quoted describing the men as “completely satisfactory in every way”. The pioneering officer cadets, nicknamed Templer’s 12 or Templer’s Superb Men, for the multiracial Federation Regiment comprised:

- Lai Chung Wah — retired a Mej. Jen.(deceased April 18, 2017)
- Victor Nelson Stevenson — retired Brig. Gen
- Lakhbir Singh Gill — retired a Mejar
- Thong Chee Sin — retired a Lt. Kol.
- Ng Boon Hwa — retired Lt. Kol.
- N. Selvarajah — retired a Mej. Jen.
- Gui Poh Chui — retired Kol.
- Leong Siew Meng — retired a Mej. Jen. (deceased)
- Khong Kim Kong — retired Lt. Kol.
- Asna Mohd Sutan — retired Brig. Gen
- Abdullah Samsudin — retired a Lt Jen
- Amiruddin Mustapha Albakri — (retired a Mejar, joined from the Royal Malay Regiment)

They paved the way for a multiracial armed forces in line with Templer's vision for the formation of a multiracial infantry regiment.

== Federation Regiment achievements ==
In 1954 and 1955, 1 Bn Federation Regiment under the command of Lt. Col. Trevor, OBE, had one confirmed kill in Sungai Bong, Butterworth by 8 Platoon, C Company. 1 Bn Federation Regiment was then transferred to Melaka and Muar and had three kills, with seven bandits captured. On 26 August 1956, the 1 Bn Federation Regiment killed the senior personal assistant to Chin Peng, Secretary General of the Malayan Communist Party. Another CT was killed during Operation Latima around Jasin. On 17 July 1957, 1 Bn Federation Regiment scored another kill in the District of Bahau.

== Merge with Federation Reconnaissance Regiment ==
On 1 January 1960, the Federation Regiment was merged with the Federation Reconnaissance Regiment and renamed the Federation Reconnaissance Corps.

== See also ==
- History of Malaysia
- Timeline of Malaysian history
