= Special Actions Unit (Malaysia) =

Malaysian tactical unit

- Unit TindaKhas (Malay) اونيت تيندق خاص
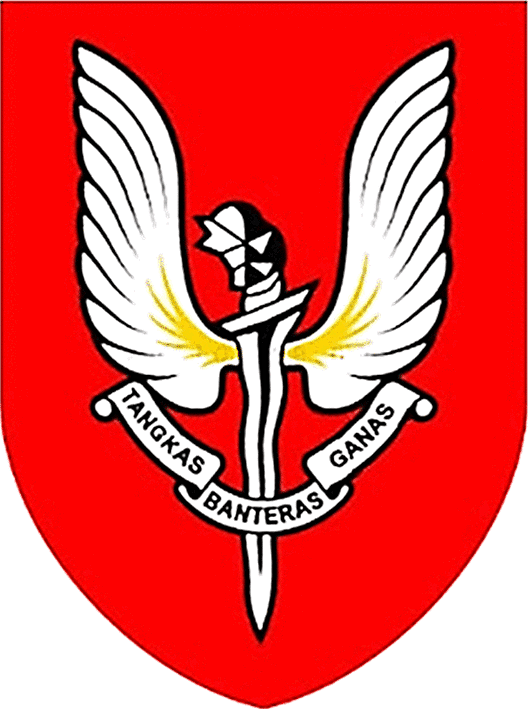
- Official Special Actions Unit insignia
- Active: 1 January 1974; 52 years ago
- Country: Malaysia
- Agency: Royal Malaysia Police
- Type: Special forces; Police Tactical Unit
- Role: Close protection; Counter-terrorism; Hostage rescue; Law enforcement
- Operations jurisdiction: National; International
- Part of: Special Operations Command
- Headquarters: Bukit Aman, Kuala Lumpur, Malaysia; 3.148725°N 101.691584°E
- Motto: "Tangkas Banteras Ganas" "Agility to Eradicate Terror"
- Common name: "Malaysia SWAT (1975)"; "The UNIT"
- Abbreviation: UTK

Structure
- Operators: Approx. 409 as of April 2023
- Squadron: Special Close Protection Unit; Assault Unit; Technical Support Unit; Combat Diver Unit

Commanders
- Current commander: SAC Hisham bin Mahmood
- Notable commanders: SAC Dato' Meor Chek Hussien Mahayuddin

Notables
- Significant operation(s): Lahad Datu standoff (2013); Muar kindergarten hostage crisis (2011); Arrest of Mas Selamat Kastari (2009); UNMIT (2006); Operation Astute (2006); Pudu Prison siege (1986); Communist Insurgency War in Malaysia; AIA building hostage crisis (1975); Operation hunt Botak Chin (1974-1975)
- Anniversaries: 1 January

The Special Actions Unit (Malay: Unit Tindakhas, Jawi: اونيت تيندق خاص), commonly known as and abbreviated to UTK, is a tactical unit of the Royal Malaysia Police (RMP). The unit is headquartered at the RMP buildings in Bukit Aman, Kuala Lumpur. Together with the 69 Commando (Malay: Komando 69), they form the Pasukan Gerakan Khas ('Special Operations Command – Police SOCOM').

The UTK performs as a high-level national tactical unit, providing 24-hour close protection to high ranking government executives, as well as their partners. Additionally, undercover and covert missions are also conducted by the unit's members. UTK operators are especially trained to intervene in high-risk situations, such as hostage and barricade situations by hostile forces; especially highly trained terrorists and/or criminals. UTK is the earliest and most experienced unit in dealing with international terrorist organizations inside and outside Malaysia.

The UTK is comparable to a combination of the German Federal Police's tactical unit GSG 9 and the United States Secret Service's Counter Assault Team.

== History ==
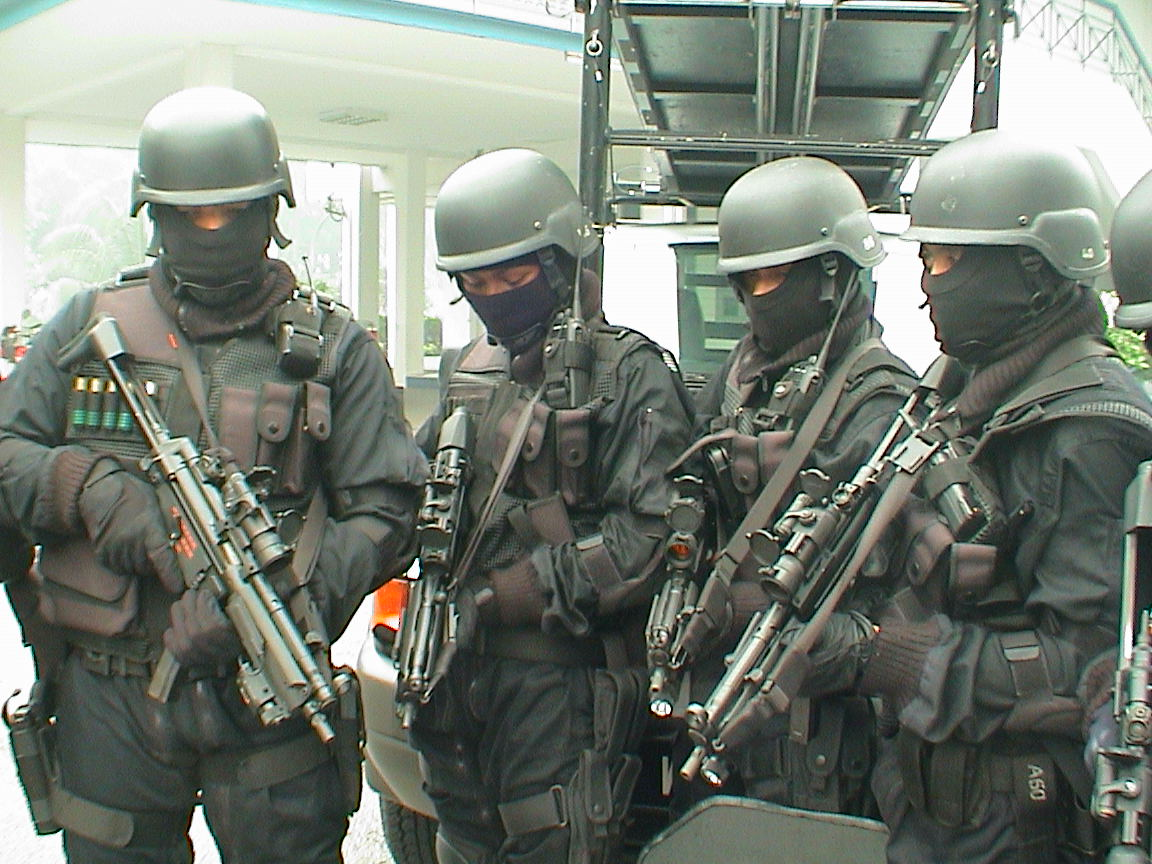
Four UTK operatives on standby. They are armed with MP5A5 equipped with Aimpoint CompM2 Sight and Insight Technology flashlight.

UTK was founded on 1 January 1975 by order of then Inspector-General of Police, Tun Hanif Omar. They were deployed on their first mission during the Japanese Red Army (Japanese: 日本赤軍; Rōmaji: Nihon Sekigun) hostage incident on 5 August 1975 where the terrorists held approximately 50 civilians including members of the US consulate and the Swedish chargé d'affaires as hostages within the AIA building housing several embassies in Kuala Lumpur, two years after the massacre of Israeli hostages in Munich, West Germany by the Palestinian Black September army group in 1973. The terrorists won the release of five imprisoned comrades and flew with them to Libya.

UTK were trained by the British Army's 22nd Special Air Service regiment (22 SAS) to operate in urban environments. UTK had also worked alongside the Grup Gerak Khas (Malaysian Army's special forces unit) to manage security during the 1998 Commonwealth Games.

=== Unification to Pasukan Gerakan Khas ===
On 20 October 1997, the Royal Malaysia Police merged VAT 69 and UTK into one special operations command known as the Pasukan Gerakan Khas (PGK; 'Special Operations Command – Police SOCOM'), which was launched by the then Prime Minister and Minister of Home Affairs, Mahathir Mohamad and then Inspector-General of Police, Tan Sri Rahim Noor.

Although amalgamated into one unit, they are still essentially two separate entities operating in two distinct operational environments.

=== National Special Operations Force ===
In 2016, select Malaysian counter-terrorism operators are grouped into one special operations task force, called the National Special Operations Force in which a few UTK operators were selected to be part of.

== Roles ==
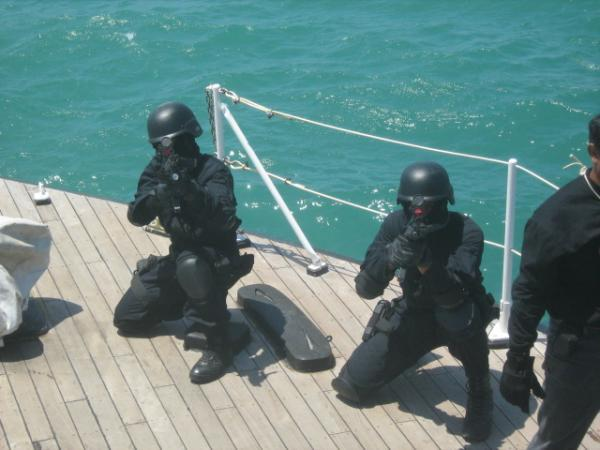
UTK operators practice storming a ship during a PGK exercise.

Under Arahan No 18/1991 Majlis Keselamatan Negara, Perenggan 13 (transl. National Security Council Directive No.19/1991, Paragraph 13) and Perintah Tetap Ketua Polis Negara 132/1991, Perenggan 3 (HTKPN 132/1991, Para 3) (transl. Inspector General of Police Standing Orders No. 132/1991, Paragraph 3), five main roles were tasked to the UTK, which are:

1. Combating terror occurring on land, especially involving buildings and ground aircraft hijacking.
2. Fighting urban guerrillas, terrorist groups, groups of subversive and extremist organizations.
3. Assist the Criminal Investigation Department (CID) in major criminal cases.
4. Securings protection to local VIPs and foreign visitors when deemed necessary.
5. Other responsibilities as directed by the Inspector-General of Police and the Deputy Inspector-General of Police.

Under the same derivative and standing order, the official name for the unit is 'Unit Tindakhas'. UTK has a variety of roles in addition to helping other branch's duties in large and serious cases.

The tactics and organization of the UTK are primarily influenced by the German GSG-9, but with a difference; UTK operatives operate mostly in plain clothes and also perform undercover missions. With approximately 300 members, the UTK is deployed in cases of hostage taking, kidnapping, terrorism and extortion. The group may also be used to secure locations, neutralize targets, track down fugitives, escorting and protecting leaders and VIPs, and occasionally conduct sniper operations. UTK members are trained to operate urban operations, airborne operations, and underwater operations.

In 2014, RMP establishes three new elite units (STAFOC, STING and STAGG). UTK and VAT 69 is given another role which is to support these three new units in term of training and technical capabilities.

== Functions and area of responsibility ==
UTK's roles are believed to include:

- Intelligence collection in deep reconnaissance missions and warfare.
- Special operations to support the RMP Special Branch in combating subversive organisations or terrorist activities.
- Counter-terrorism operations inside Malaysian territory in conjunction with armed forces.
- Law enforcement operations in dealing with armed criminals inside Malaysian territory.
- Protection of senior Malaysian dignitaries, ministers and VIPs.
- Support in terms of technique and training to other RMP Elite units; Tiger Platoon, UNGERIN, and CID All Black Units

As a part of Police SOCOM, the area of responsibility in Malaysia was divided between the two SOCOM detachments. The areas of responsibility that being given to UTK are: Johor, Kuala Lumpur, Malacca, Negeri Sembilan, Putrajaya, Selangor.

== Identities ==
Former Deputy Inspector-General of Police, Tan Sri Mohd Jamil Johari bestowing the maroon beret to a policeman who pass the Basic Special Action Course.

=== Maroon berets ===
UTK operators wear blueish shades (bordeaux colour) of maroon beret as it is worn by the British SAS during the time period. The maroon beret given by 22 SAS acted as to prove UTK as a special forces unit.

On 14 November 2006, for the first time in the history of Royal Malaysian Police, the maroon and sand colored berets of PGK were honored as Royal Berets by Yang Dipertuan Agong Tuanku Syed Sirajuddin Syed Putera Jamalullail, the then King of Malaysia.

=== Parachute wings ===
The parachute wings identify the abilities of UTK in parachutist, airborne unit and air assault operations. These can only be worn after passing the Basic Tactical Parachuting Course (Malay: Kursus Asas Payung Terjun Taktikal).

=== UTK insignia ===
The UTK insignia was influenced by the British SAS and Malayan Scouts' (now known as 22 SAS) insignia, since the unit had been trained by them.

== Organisation ==
Previously separate entities, both the VAT 69 and the UTK were merged into the PGK Command on 20 October 1997, launched by the fifth Inspector General of Police, Tan Sri Rahim Noor. However, the VAT 69 and the UTK are still operating as separate units. The UTK is now officially known as Pasukan Gerakan Khas Detachment A and VAT 69 Pasukan Gerakan Khas Detachment B.

Based at the Royal Malaysia Police Headquarters in Bukit Aman, Kuala Lumpur, the UTK is under the direct command of RMP's Internal Security and Public Order Department (Malay: Jabatan Keselamatan Dalam Negeri dan Ketenteraman Awam). The unit commander holds the rank of Senior Assistant Commissioner (SAC) and unit deputy commander holds the rank of Assistant Commissioner of Police (ACP).

With the growing threat of terrorism since the 11 September attacks, this unit has adapted itself to conduct counter-terrorism duties. With the aim of creating teams that are capable of dealing with a broad range of operations (especially counter-terrorism operations), the PGK small patrol team consists of six to ten operatives led by officers ranked from Police Inspector to Superintendent of Police with different expertises such as an assault units, snipers, communications experts, EOD experts and field medics. The PGK has also forged closer relations with the special forces of the Malaysian Armed Forces, including the elite 10th Parachute Brigade, 21st Grup Gerak Khas, PASKAL and PASKAU, so as to enable them to more effectively enforce security within Malaysia's borders.

=== Squadrons under UTK ===
Despite having limited members, the UTK is composed of various teams with their own specialized duties and expertise. Publicly known teams under UTK are:

Name (English)	Name (Malay)	Roles/Functions	Est.	Notes
Special Close Protection Unit	Unit Kawalan Rapat Khas	Provides close protection to the VVIP, prime minister, deputy prime minister, ministers, ex-prime ministers and King of Malaysia		
Assault Unit	Unit Penggempur	Counter Assault, Sniping, Airborne Team, Transport and Building raid	1975	
Technical Support Unit	Unit Bantuan Teknik	This service group maintains the UTK armoury, other assets and equipment such as UTK JAWS, MRAP Typhoon, EOD, K9, Surveillance, Intelligence as well as involved in testing, repairing and purchasing weapons, ammunition, and explosives.	1975	
Combat Diver Unit	Unit Selam Tempur	Diving and maritime operations, for example anti-piracy, amphibious assault, VBSS and underwater demolition.	1985	

== Recruitment, selection and training ==
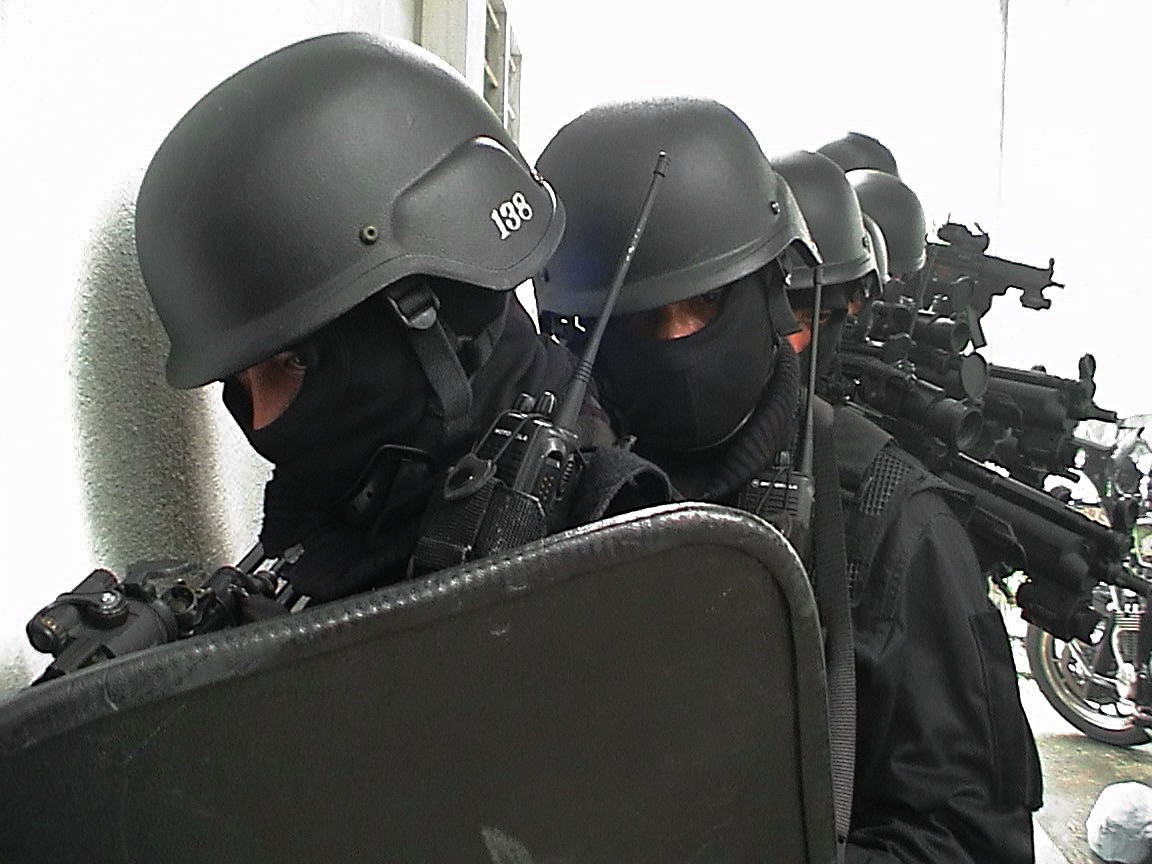
Several UTK operatives moving during a close quarters combat drill at the killing house. The first operative is equipped with a tactical shield.

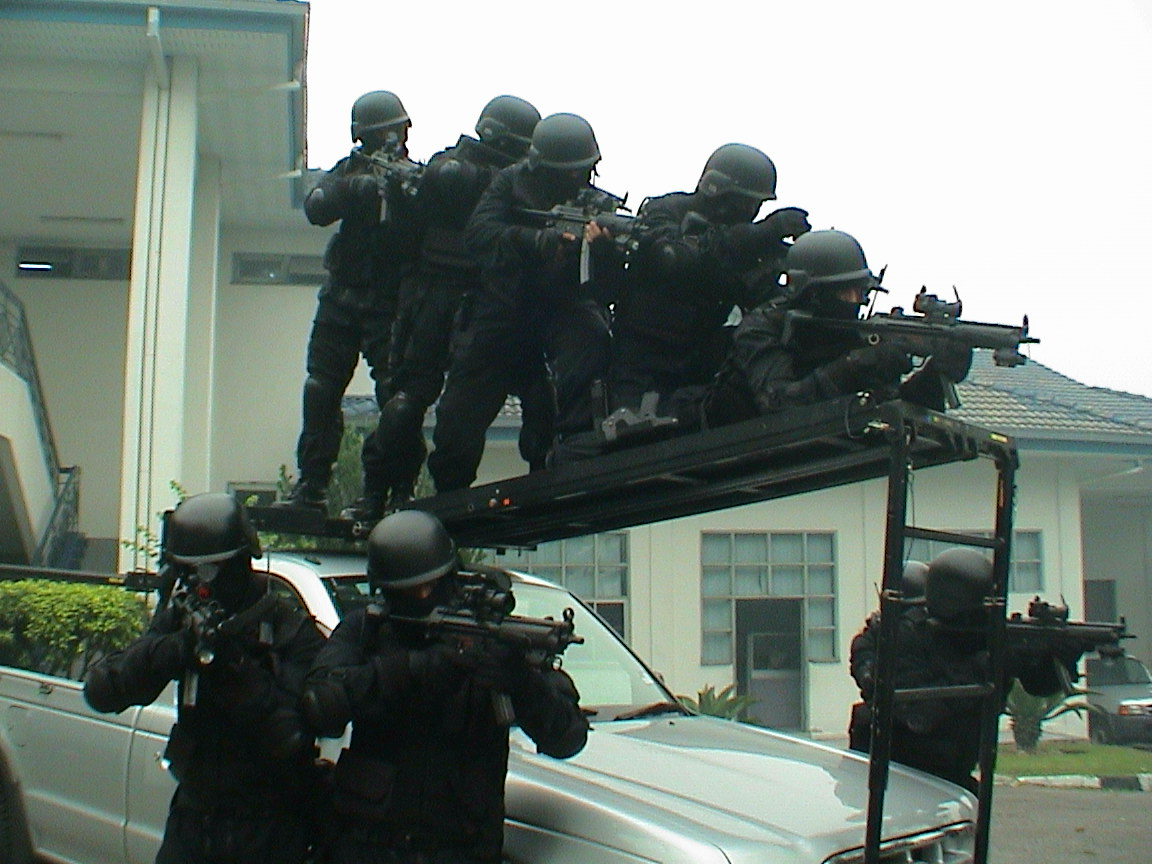
The UTK operators standby for Counter-Terrorism and Hostage Rescue drill. Five of them are on the top of assault ladder which equipped on the Ford Explorer Rapid Intervention Vehicle (RIV).

All members of the Malaysian police force with two years of service may enter UTK Selections. Depending on the department's policy, officers generally have to serve a minimum tenure within the department before being able to apply for a specialist section such as VAT 69 or UTK. This tenure requirement is based on the fact that PGK officers are still law enforcement officers and must have a thorough knowledge of department policies and procedures. To be eligible to join the Pasukan Gerakan Khas, one must be younger than thirty years old and have a good health record.

=== Physical screening test ===
Prospective trainees are expected to exceed the minimum requirements of the physical screening test (PST), which requires that trainees must be able to:

1. Run 2.4 km below 9 minutes
2. Freestyle swimming for at least 8-10 laps
3. Do at least 9-13 pull-up reps
4. Do at least 30 sit-up reps
5. Do at least 60 push-up reps
6. Do at least 30 squat thrusts

=== UTK pre-selection (2 Weeks) ===
Candidates need to pass 14-day UTK selection process in Kuala Lumpur before the real course in Ulu Kinta, Perak and Maktab Teknik PDRM (MTPDRM; 'RMP Technical College'), Bakri, Muar, Johor.

=== Basic special actions course (13 Weeks) ===
Known as Kursus Asas UTK in Malay, the basic course lasts for three months, which includes thirteen weeks of basic training and nine weeks of advanced training. This course is open to women. The attrition rate for this course is 80% and up to 95%.

Among the training in the basic special actions course is:

1. Fitness training (camp phase)
2. Physical and mental training (jungle phase)
3. Basic rope training
4. Basic first aid training
5. Unarmed combat training (Malay: Latihan Tempur Tanpa Senjata)
6. Marksmanship
7. Basic close quarters combat (Malay: Latihan Asas Tempur Jarak Dekat)
8. Basic hostage rescue (urban, aircraft and train)

In 2016, from 320 applicants, only 18 police personnel passed the selection. One of them is a woman senior officer.

=== Continuation training ===
To accomplish its varied mission profiles, the UTK ensures that its members are well trained in the required aspects of special operations. These include:

Insertion techniques

- HALO/HAHO
- Fast roping techniques
- Helo casting
- Abseiling
- Combat diving

Combat techniques

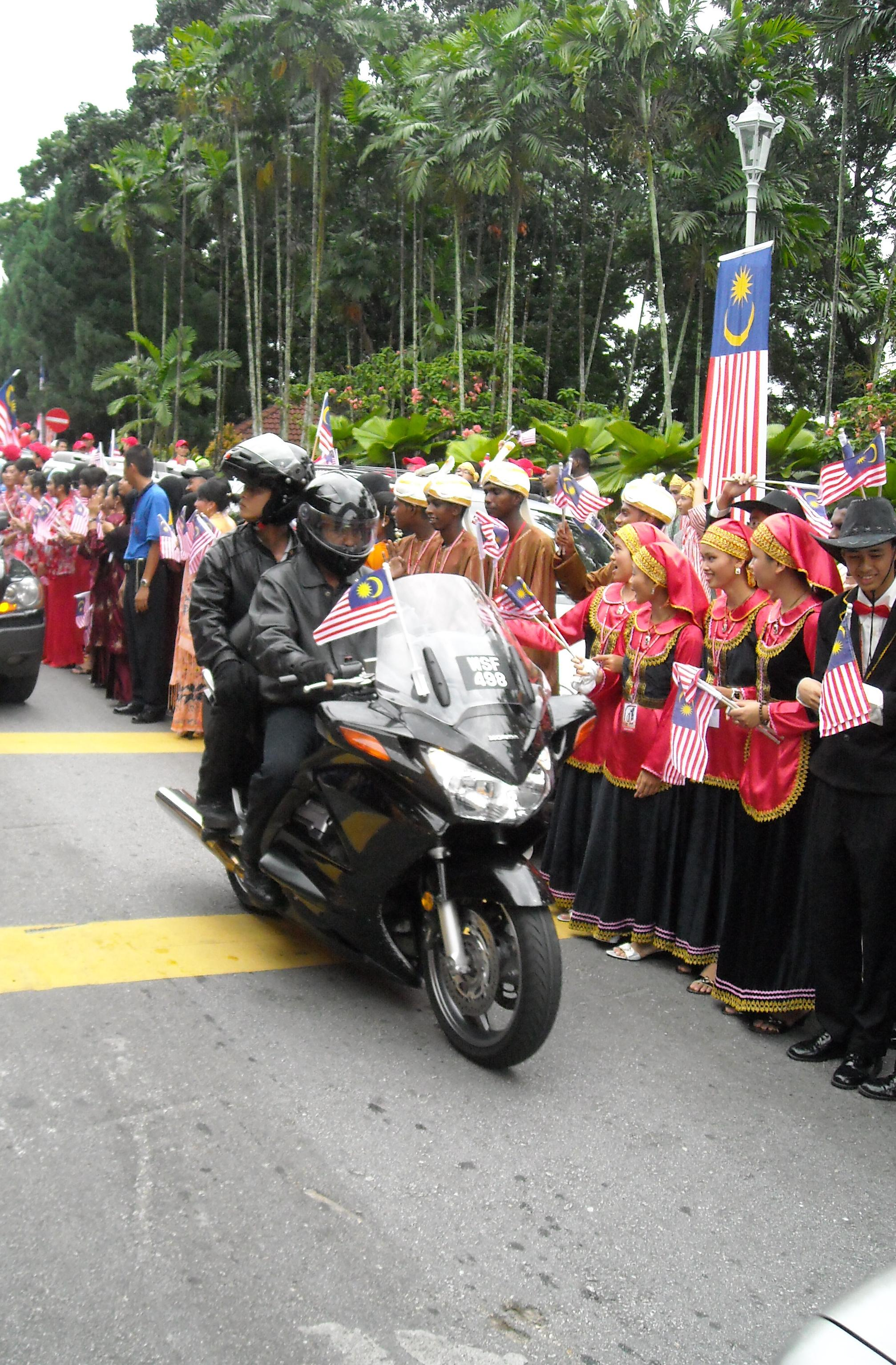
UTK operators riding the Honda ST1300 escorted the VIP vehicles out to the exit gate of Parliament Square after the 52nd Independence Day Parade on 31 August 2009.

- Close quarters combat – CQC
- Counter-insurgency
- Unconventional warfare
- Sabotage
- Close VIP protection
- Vehicular assault
- Unarmed combat
- Knife combat
- Marksmanship
- Booby-trap defusing
- Underwater demolitions

Intelligence gathering

- Intelligence
- Counterintelligence
- Special reconnaissance
- Long-range combat patrol

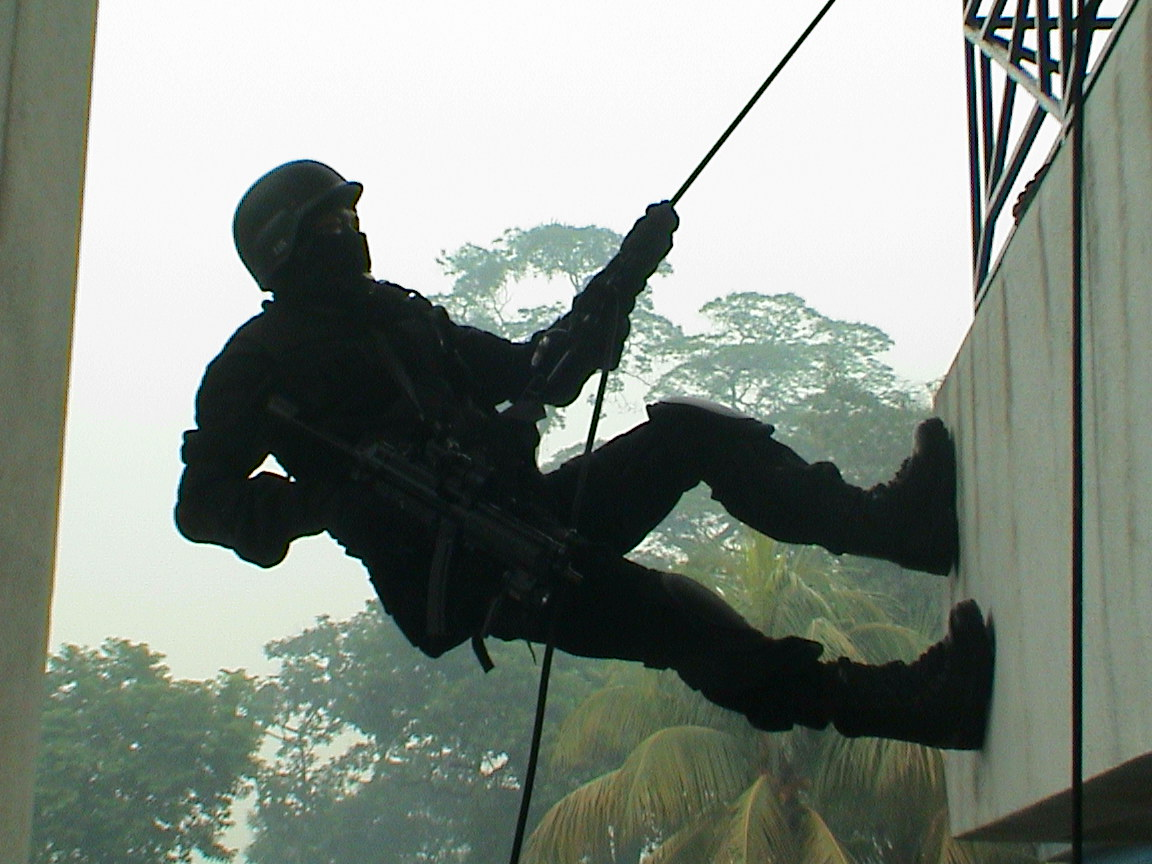
An UTK operator rappels on a building.

Task oriented

- Aircraft hijackings
- Car stops
- Combat search and rescue (CSAR)
- Coordinate multi-location warrant service
- Dignitary protection
- Explosive ordnance disposal (EOD)
- Foreign language
- Fugitive tracking (in rural environments)
- Hazmat disposal
- High-risk arrests (armed and dangerous subjects)
- Hostage rescue (HR)
- K9 handling
- Operations in WMD environments
- Site surveys for high visibility events
- Specialized sniper operations
- Stronghold assaults (structures requiring specialised breaching equipment that local law enforcement might not have access to)
- Tubular assaults (aircraft, trains, buses, etc.)

The UTK is known to conduct joint training exercises and participate in exchange programs with Commonwealth special ops units such as the Australian SAS, British SAS, New Zealand SAS and Singapore Special Tactics and Rescue. Occasionally, the UTK trains with FBI Hostage Rescue Team, French GIGN and RAID, German GSG 9, Italian NOCS, Spanish G.E.O, U.S. Delta Force, U.S. Army Green Berets, Russian Special Rapid Response Unit and other international units.

On 10 December 2003, the then inspector general of police, Tan Sri Mohd Bakri Haji Omar, launched the training program between the USSOCPAC and the 69th PGK at the General Operations Force Training Center in Ulu Kinta, Perak. The teams of SOCPAC were to conduct joint exercise with the PGK, under the code-name Advance Vector Balance Mint for a duration of 2 weeks. Only 42 out of the 194 participants completed the inaugural program.

== Combat uniform ==
UTK operator uniform wear frost-grey-coloured fire-resistant combat clothing made in Slovenia.

== Equipment ==
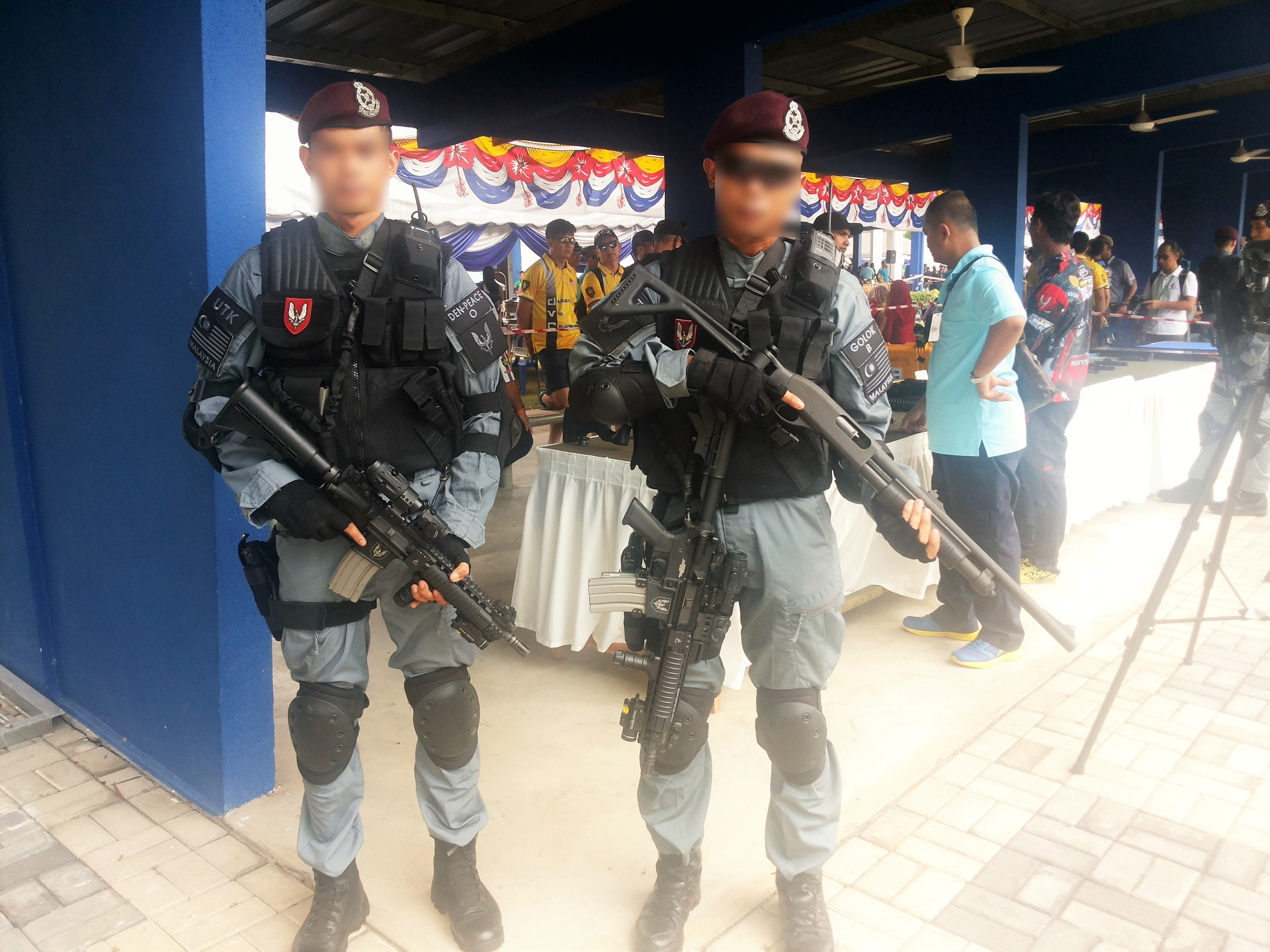
UTK operators with new Battle Dress Uniforms on standby at the Centre Brigade of General Operations Force Base, Cheras, Kuala Lumpur. They are arms with an American-made FERFRANS SCW compact carbines and the Remington M870 Police Magnum.

UTK's teams use equipment designed for a variety of specialist situations.

The particular pieces of equipment vary from unit to unit, but there are some consistent trends in what they wear and use.

Many of their equipment is indistinguishable from that supplied to the military, not least because much of it is military surplus.

=== Weapons ===
As a special operations unit, the UTK is equipped with a wide variety of high-class weapons and support equipment commonly associated with counter-terrorism operations.

==== Current ====
Name	Type	Origin	Notes	References
Colt Python	Revolver	United States		
Taser X26	Electroshock weapon	United States		
Glock	Semi-automatic pistol	Austria	17, 18, 26, 34 variants used	
Heckler & Koch Mk23 Mod 0	Semi-automatic pistol	Germany		
Heckler & Koch USP	Semi-automatic pistol	Germany		
SIG Sauer SP2022	Semi-automatic pistol	Germany		
Franchi SPAS-12	Shotgun	Italy		
Remington 870	Shotgun	United States	Police Magnum variant used	
Remington 1100	Shotgun	United States		
CZ Scorpion Evo 3	Submachine gun	Czech Republic	A1 variant used; fitted with various different optics	
Heckler & Koch MP5	Submachine gun	Germany	A5, K-A3, SD3 variants used; fitted with Insight Technologies underbarrel flashlights (for A5) and Aimpoint CompM2 red-dot optics	
Heckler & Koch MP7	Personal defense weapon	Germany	A1 variant used; fitted with Aimpoint CompM2 red-dot optics	
Heckler & Koch HK416	Assault rifle	Germany	A3, D10RS, D14.5RS variants used; fitted with Aimpoint CompM2 red-dot optics.	
Ferfrans SCW	Assault rifle	United States Philippines	Fitted with Aimpoint Micro-T red-dot optics.	
FN SCAR-H	Battle rifle	Belgium	Fitted with Aimpoint CompM2 red-dot optics	
Accuracy International PM	Sniper rifle	United Kingdom		
Accuracy International AX338	Sniper rifle	United Kingdom		
Accuracy International AWSM	Sniper rifle	United Kingdom		
Barrett M107A1	Sniper rifle	United States		
Remington 700P	Sniper rifle	United States		

==== Retired ====
Name	Type	Origin	References
Heckler & Koch P9	Semi-automatic pistol	Germany	
Steyr MPi 69	Submachine gun	Austria	
Beretta M12	Submachine gun	Italy	
MAC-10	Submachine gun	United States	
Lee–Enfield	Bolt-action rifle	United Kingdom	
L1A1 Self-Loading Rifle	Battle rifle	United Kingdom	
Heckler & Koch PSG1	Designated marksman rifle	Germany	
Heckler & Koch HK11	Light machine gun	Germany	

=== Combat gear ===
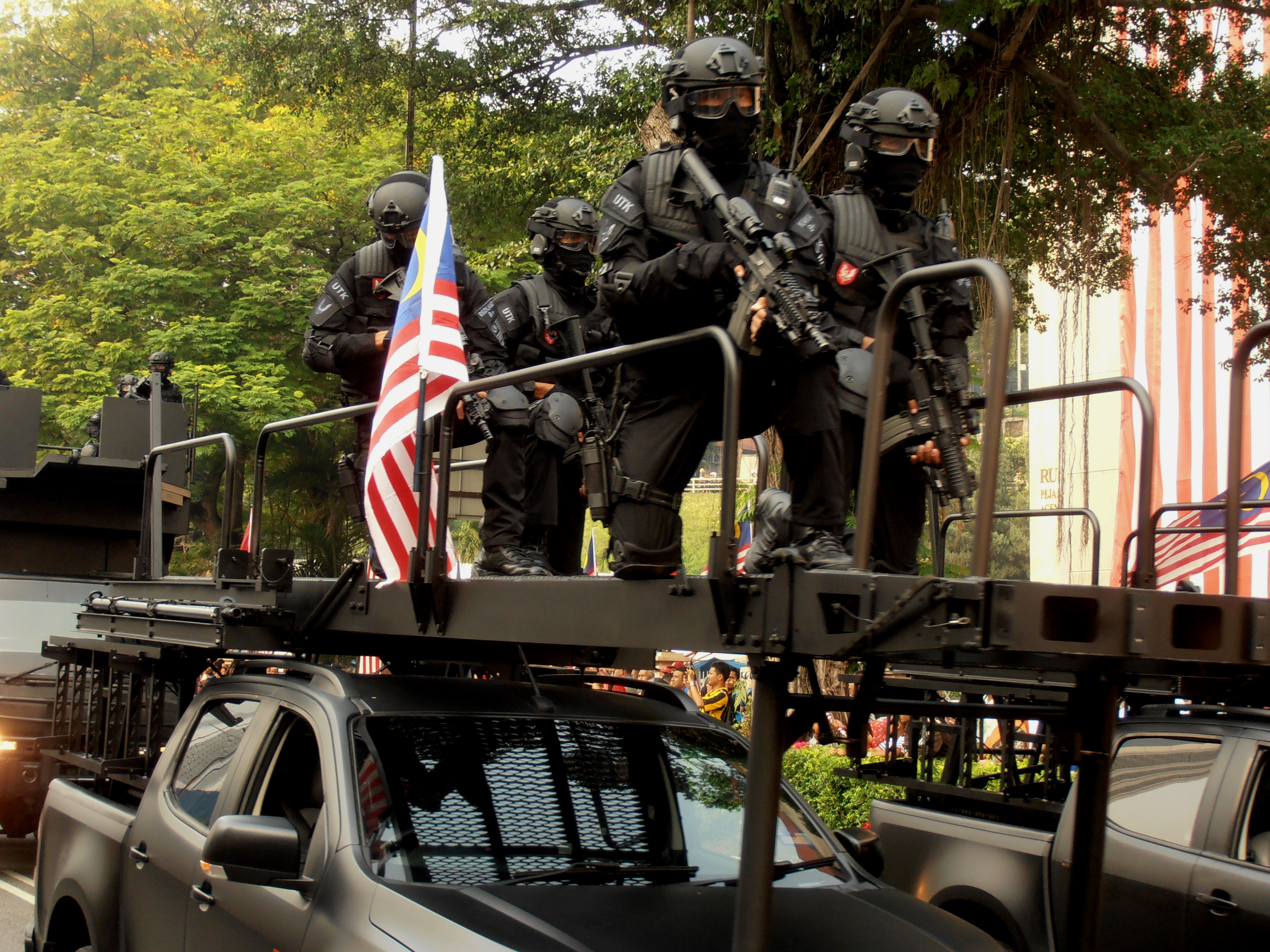
Officers from the Special Actions Unit, Royal Malaysia Police, on the Rapid Intervention Vehicle at the Sultan Abdul Samad Street for the 2015 National Day Parade in Kuala Lumpur. They dons the new Marine Ops Core tactical helmets and new Ferfrans SCW carbines.

- Communication equipment
- Tactical equipment
- Watch
  - Garmin UTK tactical-watch, with GPS functions.
- Helmet
  - Ops-Core FAST helmet SF Ops-Core

=== Tactical vehicles ===
As a special forces unit, the UTK employs a number of specialized vehicles to accomplish its missions. These include the Streit Typhoon, IAG Jaws, Commando V-150D and the GKN Sankey AT105 armoured personnel carriers equipped with M60s as assault vehicles in urban terrain as well as modified police MPV (Mobile Patrol Vehicles), vans, trucks, 4WD and buses for use as tactical vehicles. PGK also employs RHIB assault boats, jet-skis and Marine Subskimmer (DPV) in maritime missions and amphibious insertions.

For its airborne operations, UTK utilizes the Cessna 206G, Cessna 208 Caravan 1 and Pilatus Porter PC-6 aircraft as well as the E-Squirrel AS-355 F2/AS-355N helicopter.

=== Developments and acquisitions ===
UTK Operators will be sent to multiple training complex outside Malaysia to sharpen their skills.

In 2017, the then Prime Minister of Malaysia, Dato' Seri Najib Razak, announced the UTK Headquarters would relocate from Bukit Aman to Semenyih, Selangor. The new base will cost 100 million Ringgit.

== List of unit commanders ==
Name	Year	Notes
Supt G.Shanmugam	1 January 1975 – 30 May 1976	First Indian commander however Shanmugam died in a car accident in 1976
Supt Ramli Abd Kadir	4 May 1976 – 2 February 1978	Ramli of a heart attack whilst he was in office
ACP Syed Mohd Muntaz Wafa	3 May 1978 – 31 July 1983	
ACP A.Navaratnam	1 August 1983 – 17 December 1986	First senior officer of VAT 69 Commando lead
Supt Meor Chek Hussein bin Mahyuddin	18 December 1986 – 31 March 1987	First term of batch 1975 appointed as commander
ACP Mohd Yusuf bin Harun	1 April 1987 – 21 January 1990	
ACP Hj Idris bin Hj Wahid	22 January 1990 – 1 February 1993	
SAC Dato' Meor Check Hussein bin Mahyuddin	2 February 1993 – 16 August 2000	2nd term before he appoint as Kuala Lumpur Police Chief and retired
Supt Johari bin Md Yahya	17 August 2000 – 17 July 2002	
Supt Sharifuddin bin Abd Ghani	18 Julai 2002-13 September 2004	1st term
ACP Mastor bin Mohd Arif	15 September 2004 – 4 September 2006	1st term previous he appoint as Deputy Commander UTK with rank ACP
ACP Mohammad Fuad bin Abu Zarin	20 September 2006 – 31 March 2008	
ACP Mastor bin Mohd Arif	29 January 2008 – 11 May 2009	2nd term
SAC Dato Sharifuddin Bin Abd Ghani	2 June 2009 – 6 November 2009	2nd term before appoint as Pahang Police Chief and retired
SAC Dato Jaafar Bin Mohd Yusof	1 January 2010 – 14 June 2013	
SAC Dato' Jamaludin bin Ibrahim	15 June 2013 – 14 April 2015	
SAC Dato' Hazani bin Ghazali	16 May 2015 – 26 June 2017	
SAC Dato' Mastor bin Mohd Arif	27 June 2017 – January 2020	3rd terms
SAC Dato' Mohd Khairi bin Khairudin	January 2020 – August 2021	
SAC Dato' Mohammad Suzrin bin Rodhi	August 2021 – October 2023	
SAC Ahmad Jafferi bin Abdullah	October 2023 – 13 February 2025	
SAC Hisham bin Mahmood PGB	15 February 2025 – present	First Star of the Commander of Valour recipient appoint as UTK commander

== Killed in the line of duty ==
Rank	Name	Year of death	Circumstances
Cpl 148953	Mohd Razkan Seran	2015	Killed in helicopter crash into a jungle along Jalan Sungai Lalang in Kampung Pasir Baru, Semenyih, Kajang, during escorting Rompin Member of Parliament, Tan Sri Jamaluddin Jarjis from Pahang to Subang.

== Missions ==
=== The hunts of Botak Chin ===
Early 1975 first task UTK is an hunt most wanted criminal Botak Chin in March 1975 three operative UTK gunfight with Botak henchmen in Sentul and two henchmen dead shot

=== Covert operations of CPM underground ===
In 1976 until 1977 UTK team conduct operation kill and arrest sub leader Communist Party Malaya (CPM) underground who active at Malacca and Johor, result a leader underground dead shot and arrest a few follower

=== The arrest of Mas Selamat Kastari ===
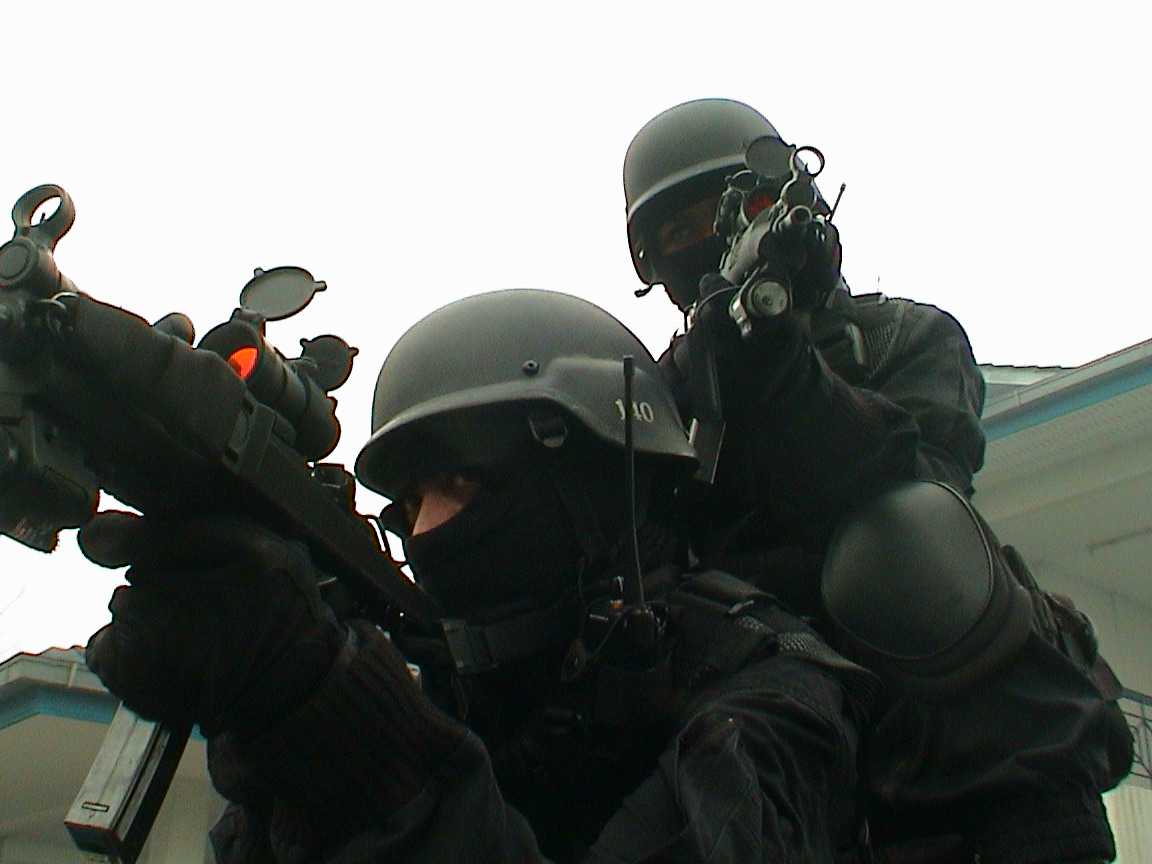
Two operatives of UTK including one female operator armed with MP5-N sub-machine guns during the CQC drill.

In February 2008, a major leader of the Singaporean Jemaah Islamiah (JI), Mas Selamat escaped from the Whitley Road Detention Center, a strict detention center in Singapore. A few months later, intelligence leads point out his location in a village house in Kampung Tawakal, Skudai, 40 km from the city of Johor Bahru.

On 1 April 2009 at 6 a.m., a UTK team were deployed to assist members of the Malaysian Special Branch in apprehending Mas Selamat. The two units surrounded the house as Mas Selamat was sleeping.

According to a 57 year old witness in the neighboring house, Mohd Saat Marjo, a two groups; one in gear (UTK) and one in plain clothes (Special Branch); stormed the house when Mas Selamat refused to surrender. The leader was handcuffed with a cloth bag placed over his head before being led out. Members of JI, Abdul Matin Anol Rahmat and Johar Hassan were also arrested there. Police had also seized a number of JI's documents and plans after sending the PDRM's Bomb Disposal Unit to secure the area of explosive threats. The involvement of UTK in the operation was not made public until recently because of the immediate need for secrecy at the time. The arrest was attributed to the Special Branch unit before the disclosure of UTK's involvement.

=== Publicly known missions ===
- 5 August 1975: UTK deployed in the first mission during the AIA building hostage crisis when the Japanese Red Army terrorists held approximately 50 civilians including members of the US consulate and the Swedish chargé d'affaires as hostages within the AIA building housing several embassies in Kuala Lumpur.
- October 1985: Special Actions Unit (UTK) was involved in hostage rescue operations involving one doctor and one medical assistant by six armed convicts led by Jimmy Chua in Pudu Jail, Kuala Lumpur. Six days later, hostages were successfully rescued, while Jimmy was captured and sentenced to death.
- 1985 Memali incident
- 29 June 1993: UTK stormed a hiding place of criminal P. Kalimuthu "Bentong Kali", who gained notoriety for being a serial killer, at Medan Damasara, Selangor. In the shoot-out with the police, Kalimuthu was successfully killed.
- 1998: The Pasukan Gerakan Khas and the Grup Gerak Khas were deployed to provide security and were on standby for hostage rescue, close protection and counter-terrorism duties during the 1998 Commonwealth Games held at National Stadium, Bukit Jalil, Kuala Lumpur on 11 to 21 September 1998.
- 18 January 2000: Involved in an operation to arrest the Geng Steyr, the armed criminal group which was led by ex-special forces personnel named Mohd Hizan Jaafar, along with 5 men after they robbed a bank in Sri Serdang Road, Selangor. During the operation, two criminals including Mohd Hizan and Abu Hasan were killed at Majidee Malay Village and two more were killed in a shoot-out with the police at Tol Plaza Kempas, Johor Bahru. Police recovered 4 Steyr AUG rifles, a Smith & Wesson .22 handgun, one Remington shotgun, 85 rounds of 5.56×45mm, 3 rounds of .22 LR, a few firearm cartridges and RM291,000. The police also launched an operation to hunt down the other two members of the gang.
- 2001: Arrested two individuals who were suspected to be Jemaah Islamiyah terrorists in the list of the Australian Department of Foreign Affairs and Trade (DFAT): Yazid Sufaat and Suhaimi Mokhtar, and detained them at the Kamunting Detention Center under the Internal Security Act (ISA) 1960 related to involvement with the activities of Jemaah Islamiyah (JI) and al-Qaeda other 11 September attacks and Bali bombings.
- 2002: Arrested six individuals who were suspected to be Jemaah Islamiyah terrorists: Abdullah Daud, Shamsuddin Sulaiman, Mat Shah Mohd Satray, Abdul Murad Sudin, Zaini Zakaria and Zainun Rashid.
- 27 September 2002: Hunted down Geng M16, the then Most Wanted criminals of Malaysia responsible for the armed robbery at the Bank of Tokyo in 1985, 16 other armed robberies in jewellery shops and pawn shops, escaping with loot whose value was estimated to be around RM 21.28 million. It was reported that all the members of this group were Chinese. The group leader was Elvis Keh Jiang Long; known locally as Ah Po; who was an ex-Singaporean National Service man (Singaporean Army). He was an expert in various firearms and was responsible for training the group for the robberies. During the gunfight with the UTK in Batu 5, Jalan Seremban-Mantin, near the Galla Recreational Park, Mantin, Negeri Sembilan, two of the Geng M16 members, identified as Sunny Chai @ Sum Wing Chang and his right-hand man, known as Hew Yau, were shot dead. However, Chang Kew Yin who was another gang member managed to escape. One UTK officer was wounded in the shootout. Police recovered an M16 rifle with two rounds of ammunition, a Colt semi-automatic handgun with 16 rounds of ammunition, a Smith & Wesson revolver and three ski-masks from the suspects' vehicles. On 28 December at 2 a.m., Chang was gunned down in the ensuing shootout at Jalan Keris, Taman Sri Tebrau, Johor Bahru. A Chinese-made Norinco pistol with three rounds of ammunition from Chang's body was found. Federal CID Director, Datuk Salleh Mat Som (late), said the police were always hunting down the Geng M16 members who were still at large, including sending their officers to Singapore and Thailand to track Keh down. They had also requested the assistance of the Australian police to locate another gang member, Hew Soon Loong @ Hong Kong Chai, who was believed to have fled to the country.
- 2003: Arrested six individuals who were suspected to be Jemaah Islamiyah terrorists: Mohd Khaider Kadran (JI leader), Wan Amin Wan Hamat, Sulaiman Suramin, Sufian Salih, Ahmad Muaz Al Bakry and Hasim Talib.
- 16 October 2003/17 October 2003: Involved in VIP protection of the Islamic leaders during the tenth Organisation of the Islamic Conference (OIC) in Putrajaya.
- 2004: Arrested three Indonesian individuals who were suspected to be Jemaah Islamiyah terrorists: Zakaria Samad, Ahmad Zakaria and Terhamid Dahalan.
- 2004: Arrested three Indonesian individuals who were suspected to be Jemaah Islamiyah terrorists: Mahfudi Saifuddin, Mulyadi and Arifin who were believed to be involved in the Bali bombings in 2004.
- 2005: Undertook VIP escort missions to protect ex-Prime Minister Tun Mahathir Mohamad when he visited Johor.
- 2006: Deployed as part of the United Nations (U.N.) INTERFET to support the Operation Astute. It consisted of Malaysian U.N. 10th Parachute Brigade, Grup Gerak Khas, Australian and New Zealand U.N Armed Forces in Timor Leste.
- 2007: Arrested four alleged Jemaah Islamiyah members: Zulkifli Marzuki, Mohd Nasir Ismail, Ahmad Kamil Hanafiah and Muhd Amir Hanafiah.
- 16 July 2008: Arrested the PKR de facto leader, Dato' Seri Anwar Ibrahim in front of his house at Bukit Segambut after sunset, similar to what happened in 1998, for investigations under Section 377C of the Penal Code for alleged "carnal intercourse against the order of nature" with his former aide, Mohd Saiful Bukhari Azlan. However, CID director Commissioner Dato' Mohd Bakri Zinin claimed that the arrest was not carried out by the UTK, but by the Bukit Aman's Serious Crimes Division (possibly by the Unit Tindakan Cepat, UTC).

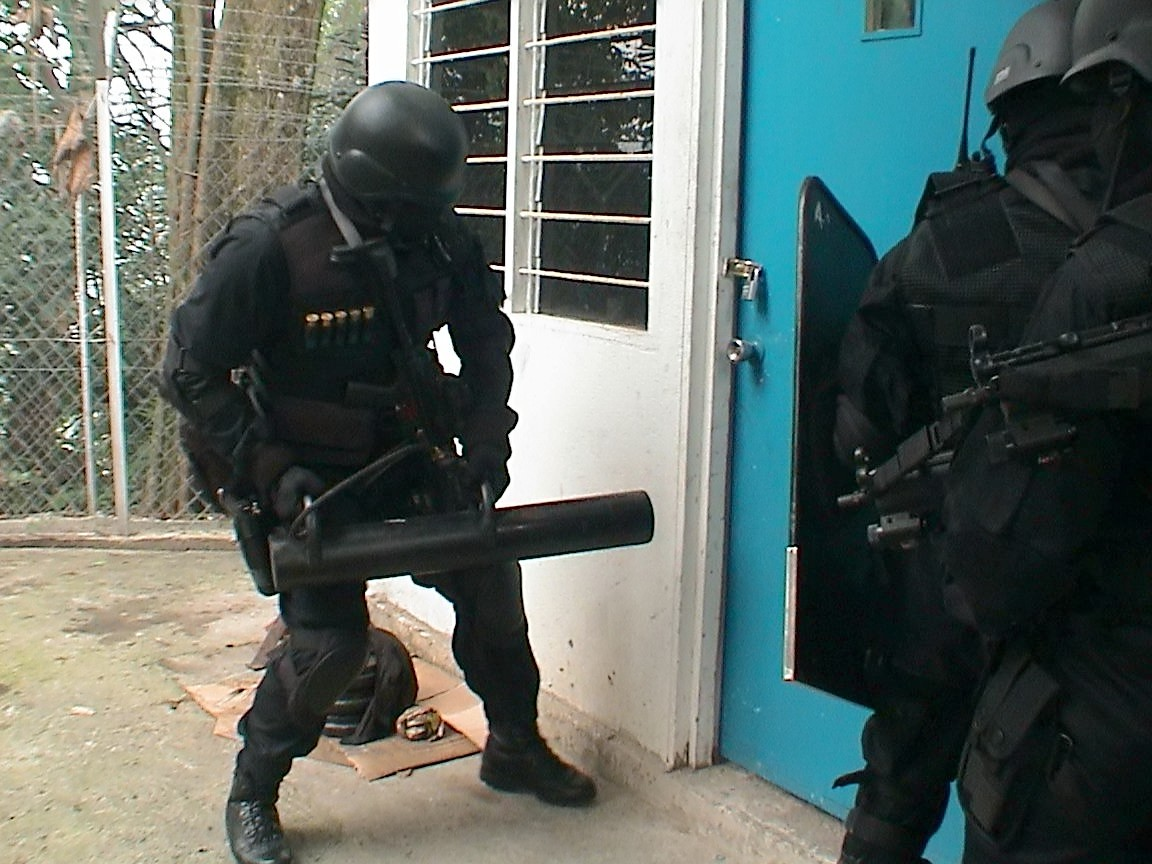
A UTK officer using a battering ram to perform a door breaching during the CQC drill

- 2009: In February 2008, a Singaporean Jemaah Islamiyah (JI) leader, Mas Selamat Kastari escaped from Whitley Detention Center, the strictest detention center in Singapore. A few months later, he was found to be hiding at a village house in Kampung Tawakal, Skudai, 40 km from Johor Bahru. Following intelligence shared with the police forces of Indonesia and Singapore led to the deploying of a UTK counter-terrorist unit at the dawn of 1 April 2009 at 06:00 a.m. to assist police Special Branch agents recapture the militant leader in the village house.
- 2010: Intercepted the Sultan of Kelantan's motorcade (escorts) 30m outside of the Kelantan Royal Palace as they were heading for the Sultan Ismail Petra Airport to depart for Singapore pending further treatment at Mount Elizabeth Hospital. The team then brought the Sultan, himself not willingly, to the nearby hospital (HUSM) somewhere 200m from the Palace.
- 8 July 2011: Deployed in a hostage rescue mission in which a preschool located at Sungai Abong Park, Sakeh Street near Muar in southern Johore state was taken by a 40-year-old man. The man named Loi Hui Chung, who was suspected to be a drug addict and mentally-deranged, was armed with a hammer and machete. The suspect threatened to kill the hostages if his demands was not met. The siege ended at exactly 3:41 p.m. after UTK members stormed the building with tear gas and shot the suspect. He had a critical head injury and died later at the Sultanah Fatimah Specialist Hospital at 9:15 p.m.
- 7 February 2013: Arrested a former Internal Security Act (ISA) detainee Yazid Sufaat and two of his friends, including a woman, in the Klang Valley, Selangor in separate operations. The unit nabbed Yazid and Mohd Hilmi Hasim at a canteen in the Jalan Duta court complex whilst the woman, Halimah Hussin, was picked up from her house in Kajang. They became the first few to be arrested under the new Security Offences (Special Measures) Act 2012 (SOSMA) which replaced the ISA. They were alleged to have been promoting terrorism, and had allegedly been linked to terrorist activities in Syria.
- 2013: Deployed in Lahad Datu, Sabah during the Lahad Datu conflict. The VAT 69 Commando members were involved in hunting down a terrorist group, numbering approximately 200 in strength, from the self-styled "Royal Security Forces of the Sultanate of Sulu and North Borneo," while UTK members were deployed in urban and populated areas to defend them. The commandos were the main assault team during the early stage of the conflict. Two officers were gunned down and three more wounded in an unexpected "white flag" ambush by the Sulu terrorists, while 12 of the terrorists were shot to death in retaliation and three other terrorists were fatally wounded.

== Controversy ==
In October 2006, an officer and two members of the UTK were arrested on suspicion of conspiring with Abdul Razak Baginda in the murder of a woman from Mongolia. She was killed before her body then blown up with PETN and RDX explosives in October 2006 in Shah Alam, Selangor.

== List of UTK members ==
This list of UTK members includes both current and former notable members of the Unit Tindakan Khas of Royal Malaysia Police.

• Mohammed Hanif Omar: Retired Inspector of General Police 4th and founder UTK. He receive honorary maroon beret on 1 January 2017 sign his effort for UTK.

• Tan Sri Mohd Zaman Khan: Retired Director Criminal Investigation Department and Deputy Commander UTK in 1975-1976 also involve 1975 AIA building hostage crisis

•Dato' Meor Chek Mahyudin: Retired Kuala Lumpur Chief Police. He was appoint twice as commander UTK.

•Dato' Mohd Yusri Hassan Basri: Former Perak Police Chief currently appoint as Director of Internal Security and Public Order Department.

•Dato' Sri Sharifuddin Ab Ghani: Retired Pahang Police Chief

•ACP Hisham Mahmood PGB: Deputy of Commander (Operation) of UTK, he received Pingat Gagah Berani in 2014 following bravery act during 2011 Muar kindergarten hostage crisis

•Ahmad Jamaludin "AJ": Veteran UTK serve with the unit from 1994 until late 2008. He was involved in an operation anti pirate in 2002, now retired and work as Commercial diving.

•Zakaria Sabtu "General": Pioneer UTK 1975 and he was involved in a few operation including hunt Raja Laut 1978 in Taiping, Perak with Heckler & Koch G3 DMR. He retired as Detective Sergeant in 1991 and produce own book based perspective Zakaria.

•Muradi Mashkor PGB: Retired Sub-Inspector and he was involved in 1986 Pudu Prison hostage crisis, he received PGB in 1987.

•Nazarudin Md Zain "Sabu": Retired Sergeant and he was involved a few operation anti-organised crime. He received PGB medal in 1987 with Muradi.

•Amiey Yaacob: Former woman Lance Corporal UTK and had served for Dato' Seri Wan Azizah Wan Ismail during appoint as Deputy Prime Minister around 2018. Amiey now retired from UTK and work as Bodyguard.

== In popular culture ==
'Unit Tindakhas' of the Royal Malaysian Police is usually misspelled by the media as 'Unit Tindak Khas' and 'Unit Tindakan Khas' which all have the same meaning.

Books, Televisions and Movies.

- 1991: "Bayangan Maut", a movie starring Dato' Yusof Haslam and Noorkumalasari. The movie shows UTK operatives in plain clothes armed with M16 rifles.
- 1996: "Maria Mariana", a movie directed by Dato' Yusof Haslam. The movie includes a hostage rescue scene involving UTK operatives.
- 1999–present: "Gerak Khas", a TV series by RTM and produced by Dato' Yusof Haslam, about a fictional UTK squad code name 'Gerak Khas' solving high-risk crimes throughout major cities in Malaysia. Gerak Khas is the longest running TV series in Malaysia.
- 1999: "Entrapment", a movie starring Sean Connery and Catherine Zeta Jones. UTK operators act as SWAT Team during the chasing scene at Petronas Twin Tower.
- 2001: "Gerak Khas The Movie", an action movie by Dato' Yusof Haslam, about Gerak Khas TV series. The movie about Gerak Khas Squad stops pirate VCD and drug selling activities in Kuala Lumpur.
- 2002: "Gerak Khas The Movie 2", a movie sequel to Gerak Khas The Movie. The movie shows UTK and VAT 69 operators conducting joint anti-drugs operations in Penang.
- 2004: "GK3", the third sequel for Gerak Khas The Movie. The movie shows UTK operators in plain clothes conducting an undercover mission in Langkawi.
- 2011: "Wira Padang Pasir", a TV drama by Astro, about an ex-VAT 69 turn UTK operator now working as a Malaysian Embassy bodyguard in Cairo, Egypt.
- 2017: "J Revolusi", an action movie by Grand Brilliance and Infinitus Productions about conflict between a UTK officer, his sister; a Special Branch agents and theirs adoptive father; a UTK Commander.
- 2017: "Majalah 3: Perisai Keamanan Bandar", a documentary by TV3 about UTK operations and training.
- 2018: "Polis Evo 2", an action movie directed by Joel Soh and Andre Chiew, starring Zizan Razak and Shaheizy Sam. In the movie, a tactical team is sent to rescue the hostages in Pulau Cherong. Only four survives the ambush and joins three other officers in rescuing the hostages. Despite the team being named UKAP (Unit Khas Anti Pengganas; 'Anti-terrorism Special Unit'), it is more likely to be modeled after UTK, whereas their operations and tactics are very similar.
- 2021: "J2: J Retribusi", is an action movie directed by Nazrul Asraff Mahzan and Nazim Shah. The movie stars former UTK members.
- 2023: "Polis Evo 3", is an action movie directed by Syafiq Yusof. In the movie, UKAP is back to takedown a former police corporal who plans to kill Inspector Khai and Inspector Sani.
- 2026:Chelot, is an action movie directed by Adrian Teh. In the movie, UTK sent to operation in a village and rescue Inspector Haqqim and Corperal Azraf beside take down mercenaries led by Bakri. This film show role team anti-drone.

== See also ==
- Elite Forces of Malaysia
