= Special Task Force On Organised Crime =

- Pasukan Tugas Khas Melawan Jenayah Terancang
- Active: 1 January 2014–27 June 2019
- Country: Malaysia
- Branch: Royal Malaysia Police
- Type: Police Tactical Unit
- Role: Domestic counter-terrorism and specialized law enforcement
- Size: 600 personnel
- Part of: Criminal Investigations Department
- Garrison/HQ: Bukit Aman Criminal Investigations Department, Kuala Lumpur
- Nickname: STAFOC

Commanders
- Notable commanders: SAC Dato' Razarudin Hussain

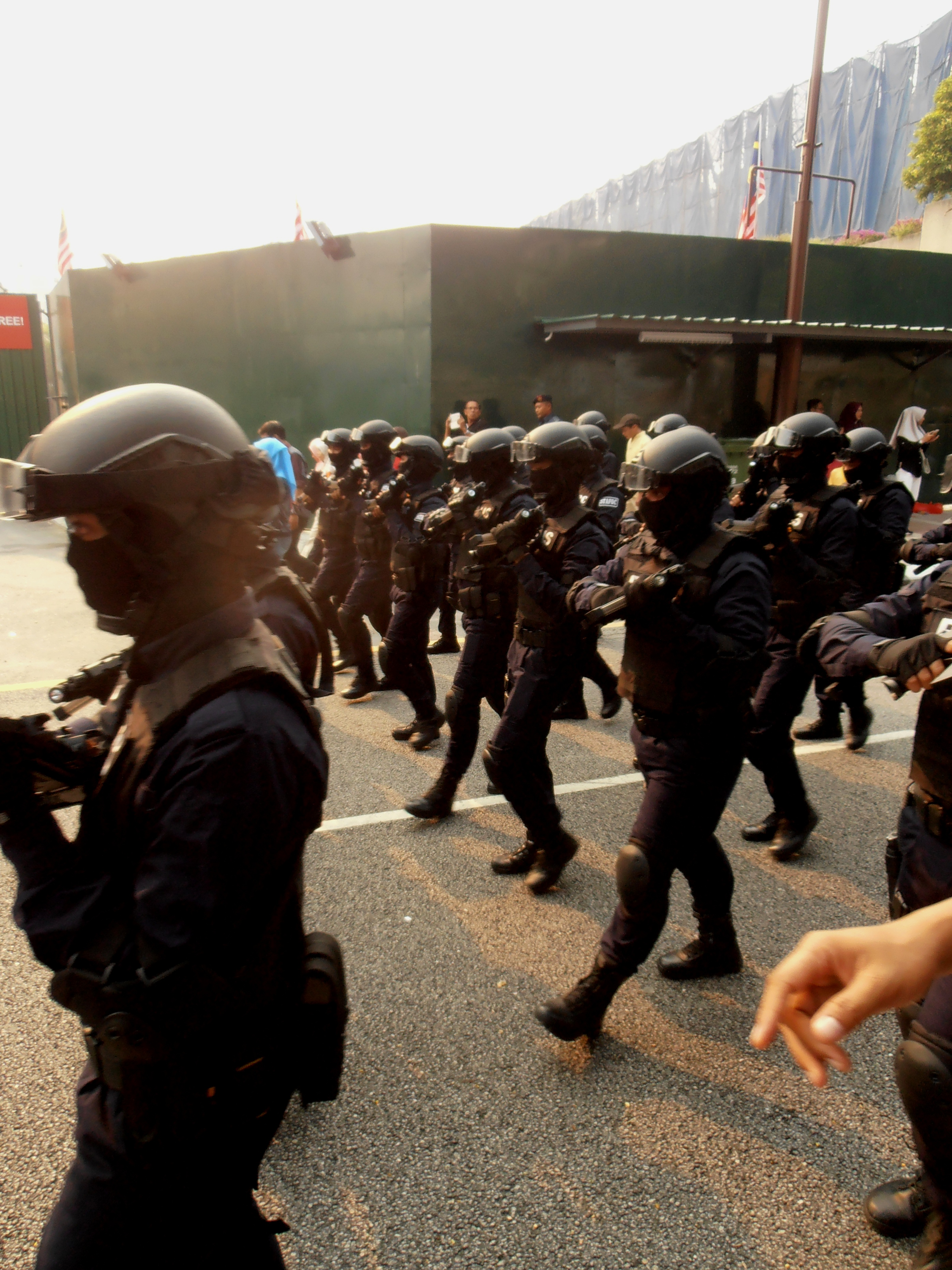
STAFOC members of Bukit Aman during the parade

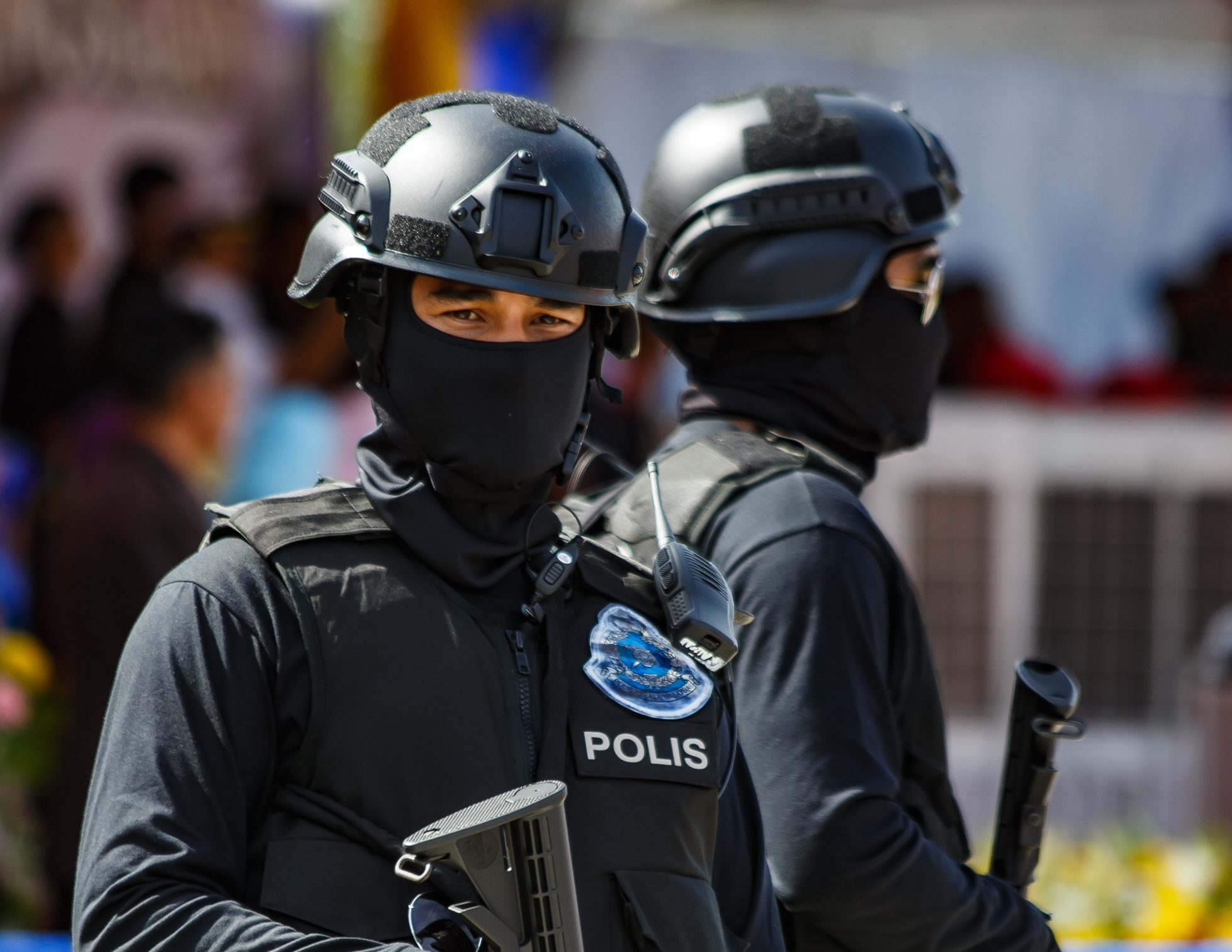
STAFOC officers in Sabah

Special Task Force On Organised Crime (STAFOC) (Malay: Pasukan Tugas Khas Melawan Jenayah Terancang) was the specialized operation armed response units of the Royal Malaysia Police.

The comparable units of the RMP are the Pasukan Gerakan Khas and UNGERIN. The unit, along with STING and STAGG were disbanded as part of the reforms after the recent 2018 Malaysian General Election. Reports shows however, the unit members from all 3 task force were merged into a single department, Organized Crime Investigation Department, D14.

== Organisation ==
The organisation of special police forces was formed following the Home Ministry's meeting with the RMP on August 22, 2013, and formed on January 1, 2014, to meet the challenges of a more sophisticated and violent trend in organised crime. 400 personnel include officers, led by a Senior Assistant Commissioner (SAC) Dato' Razarudin Bin Hussain, will be equally divided and placed with the Criminal Investigations Department (CID) and the Narcotics Crimes Investigations Department (NCID). They operate on the concept of "Intelligence Led Policing and Aggressive Action on Organised Crime". They will focus on serious crimes including illegal syndicates, gangsterism, gambling, vice, human trafficking, prostitution and drug gangs.

== Training ==
Any police officer (men and women) handpicked from various departments is eligible to apply for service for STAFOC unit. They undergo training with the elite VAT 69 Commando and urban counter-terrorist division Unit Tindakhas (UTK).

== Missions ==
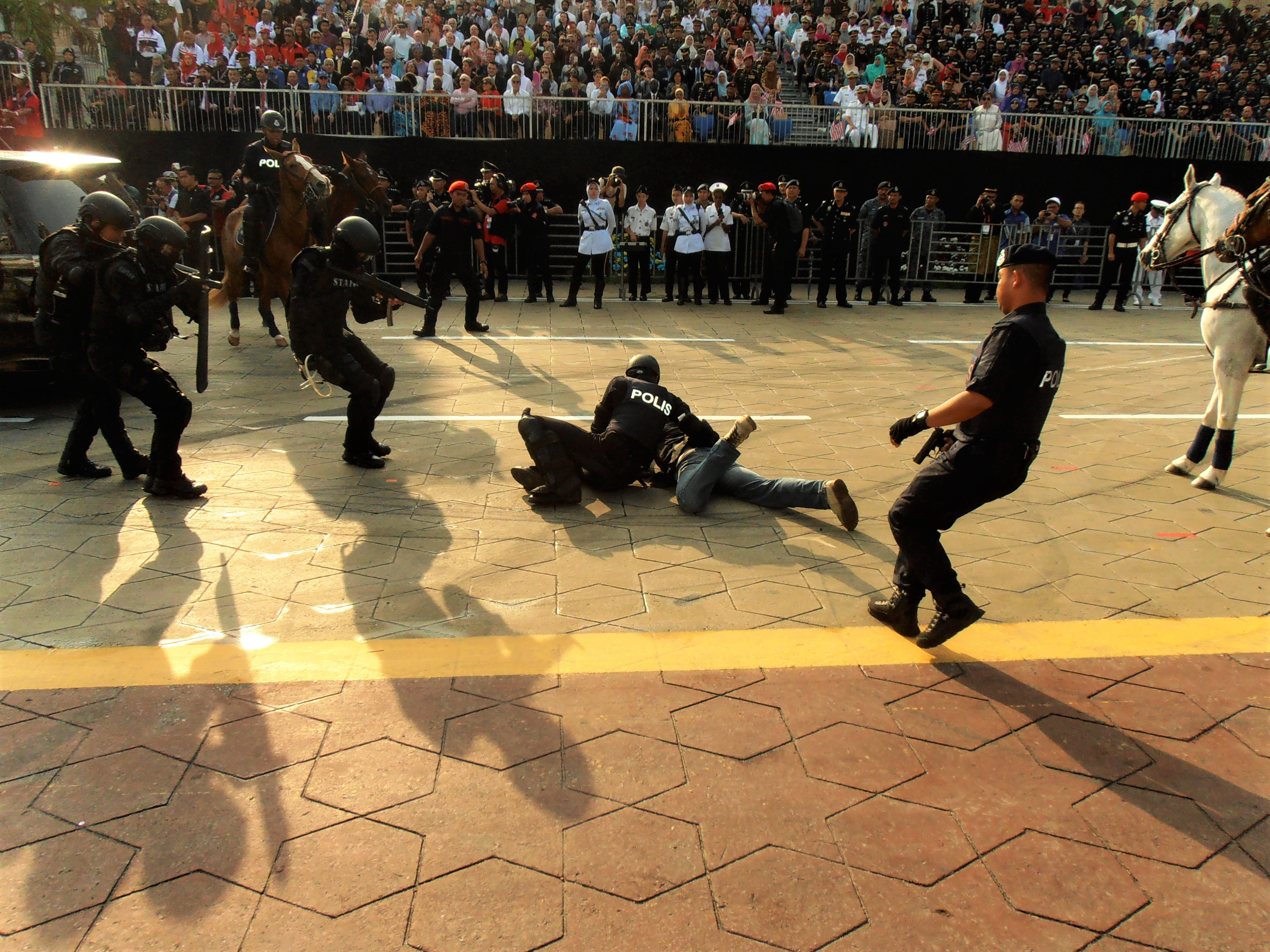
Teams of STAFOC, STING, STAGG and police task force officers arrest an 'assailant' during demonstrations show of the 59th Merdeka Day in Kuala Lumpur.

- October 4, 2014 – STAFOC is now involved in efforts to track down the suspects, believed to be Latin Americans, who masterminded the syndicate that hacked Automatic Teller Machines (ATMs) in the country.
- March 13, 2015 – A 27-year-old man, believed to be a triad member, was shot dead by STAFOC in a shootout in Lencongan Barat, Bandar Languna Merbok, Kedah. The suspect, K. Sujenthiran, believed to be a member of Gang 35, opened fire after a team attempted to get close to his black Proton Wira Aeroback before the officers returned fire in self-defense. Police recover the Czech-made of 9mm Luger semi-automatic handgun from the dead suspect.
- March 31, 2015 – Combined officers of STAFOC and Perak State CID shot dead three criminals. Two firearms were seized during the gunfight in Kampung Simee, Ipoh. Three suspects were highly dangerous and wanted for robbery in the city and its surrounding areas. While police tried to approach the suspects' car, they sped off and a chase ensued before the shootout.
- August 4, 2015 – STAFOC officers arrested three suspects of a human trafficking syndicate in an operation at Rawang, Selangor. Three pregnant women and a baby were rescued as a result of the raid.
- August 11, 2015 – Perak State Police Contingent, with the help of Bukit Aman STAFOC, raided a weapon storage site. They seized five shotguns and arrested 21 suspects from Egypt, Bangladesh, Myanmar and locals at Taiping, Perak. Police also seized 13 lorries and a stolen Hilux.
- August 11, 2015 – At 3:15pm, a team of officers and members of the Kedah CID D9, along with Bukit Aman STAFOC, arrested two suspects at a parking lot on Sungai Petani, Kedah. The arrest led to the seizure of a handgun, 17 9mm rounds, scythe, heroin, shabu, and various other drugs and weapons. Further investigation led to the seizure of two airsoft guns at a suspect's house.
- August 13, 2015 – Police busted a syndicate that dismantles stolen vehicles to be sold as spare parts on the global market at Trong, Perak. The raid was conducted by STAFOC and Perak CID arrested 22 men, which included ten foreigners and one Egyptian, suspected as the buyer of illegal spare parts. All suspects will be investigated under Section 379 Penal Code for theft.
- September 16, 2015 – STAFOC members were involved with investigating the whereabouts of Kevin Morais, a deputy public prosecutor who was kidnapped on 4 September. His body was found cemented in an oil drum along a secluded pathway at Persiaran Subang Mewah, USJ 1, Subang Jaya at 6am.
- October 15, 2015 – STAFOC team crippled a contract killing syndicate by arresting two men and seized four handguns at two separate arrests at Skudai, Johor. It is believed that the syndicate was closely linked to the Gang 21 secret society, which is also involved in other criminal activities such as drug dealing. With the successful arrest, it is possible that more arrests will be conducted soon.
- December 2, 2015 – STAFOC team were involved in assisting Gombak and Selangor CID teams in patrolling Persiaran Bukit Takun following a spate of robberies and house break-ins. A high speed car chase ensued and STAFOC returned fire when the occupants tried to shoot at them, killing one of the suspects. The driver managed to flee.
- July 14, 2016 – Police shot dead a suspect involved in the murder of four family members, including a 2 years old kid, in a shootout near Air Hitam, Penang. Initially police believed that the suspect had already left the island. Upon receiving a tip off, a STAFOC team deployed to investigate, which led to the gunfight, killing the suspect.
- July 16, 2016 – Police solved June 6th shooting case at Taman OUG which saw a real estate agent killed and her 8 year old seriously injured with the arrest of 8 suspect connected with the murder. STAFOC teams has built up the lead on all 8 suspects and arrested them, including the pistol used during the murder.
- February 3, 2016 – STAFOC teams arrested 34 members of Gang 36 syndicate in a raid dubbed Ops Cantas Khas, in which they confiscated 6 pistols, 1 rifle, bullets, and 10 kg of drugs. This seize also opened new leads on the murder of Royal Malaysian Custom's Deputy Director General, Datuk Shaharuddin Ibrahim. The Deputy D-G has served with the Customs for over 30 years, and has earned him the moniker "Mr Clean" and was murdered a year away from retirement at April 26, 2013.
- February 13, 2017 – A high-profile murder involving the estranged brother of North Korean premier, Kim Jong-Nam who were assaulted by two women at Kuala Lumpur International Airport (klia2). STAFOC was tasked to investigate the murder. The result was a Vietnamese women who was arrested on the next day, Đoàn Thị Hương, an Indonesian women who were arrested on the 16th February, Siti Aisyah, and a North Korean national Ri Jong-Chol, who is believed to have prepared the toxic used in the murder. STAFOC teams too were assigned to protect the mortuary where the body of Kim Jong-Nam were kept, escorted all suspects from prison to the courthouse, and during the deportation of Ri Jong-Chol.
- August 19, 2017 – Federal Police's Special Task Force on Organized Crime (STAFOC) deployed a team to Kedah to assist in investigation involving a murder of a cop. Meanwhile, Kedah Criminal Investigation Department (CID) is in the process to identify the suspect and initial report indicates that the suspect was formerly arrested under Prevention Of Crime Act (POCA), 2 years ago and are placed with Electronic Monitoring Device (EMD) to monitor the movement and were placed in exile. In the incident, Sub-Inspector Abu Hashim Ismail, 54, from Bukit Aman's Triad and Secret Societies Division (D7A) was killed after being shot while talking with the suspect at a house in Changloon, Kedah. The case is solved with the arrest of all suspect on August 25, 2017. The motive of the killing is likely due to Abu Hashim Ismail involvement in investigating an arms smuggling activity near the border.
- January 6, 2018 – Two suspected robbers were shot dead by police in a separate incidents in Cheras and Bandar Sunway. One of them is believed to be linked with a series of recent jewelry store heists in Negri Sembilan and Klang Valley. Federal police's Special Task Force on Organized Crime (STAFOC) and City police's Serious Crimes Division (D9) received information on a robbery suspect in Taman Connaught, Cheras. The team had instructed the suspect to stop the vehicle for inspection, and the suspect fired shot towards the police instead. The team responded and returned fire, killing the suspect.
- January 15, 2018 – Two armed robbery suspects were shot dead by police in the state of Malacca. Early report indicates that both suspect have 8 criminal cases committed at Selangor, Kuala Lumpur and Johor. The modus operandi of the suspect is to wait for victims coming out from bank and rob them. They were believed to be scouting for location to conduct the robbery when STAFOC members spotted a suspicious car waiting alongside a stretch of road. When approached and requested to be identified, suspect opened fire, prompting the officers to retaliate, killing both suspect in the process.
- February 19, 2018 – A team of Bukit Aman's Special Task Force on Organized Crime (STAFOC) and Serious Crimes Division (D9) shot dead an armed robber on Johor, and solved six robbery case related to the suspect. It was reported that in the 10.50pm incident, a team from STAFOC and D9 were trailing the suspect in a car, and upon orders to stop the vehicle, the suspect rammed the police vehicle and fired several shots to the police team. Police returned fire and in the commotion, the suspect was shot dead.
- February 20, 2018 – STAFOC teams escorted 36 individuals from the notorious Gang 04 syndicate, which has been arrested in a special operation codenamed Ops Cantas Silver. The group has also been linked to the murder of a Datin in Taman OUG in 2016. They escorted all 36 suspects in 5 police vehicles, including 3 Black Maria and 2 trucks from the Perak Police's Contingent HQ. Police officers were seen setting up roadblocks leading to the courthouse as early as 8am to allow the convoy pass through smoothly. It was reported over more than 100 police officers were involved in crippling the gang, which led to the arrest of key persons in the group.
- April 10, 2018 – A nationwide crackdown on organized crime saw the arrest of 82 gangsters, including two people with titles of 'Datuk Seri' and 'Datuk'. Police seized weapons, cash, jewellery, vehicles and property worth RM3.2m during the operation, was launched on March 29. The arrests and seizures were made after 3 months of surveillance and intelligence gathering by the Selangor and Kuala Lumpur police contingents. They were assisted by officers from STAFOC, STAGG, and a team from Anti Money Laundering Act team. A total of 83 members of Gang 08 and Gang 18 were targeted during the operation, which were dubbed Operation Spider for Gang 08, and Operation Api Reload for Gang 18.

== STING ==
Special Tactics and Intelligence Narcotics Group
- Pasukan Khas Taktikal dan Perisikan Narkotik
- Active: 30 January 2014–27 June 2018; 12 years
- Country: Malaysia
- Branch: Royal Malaysia Police
- Type: Police Tactical Unit
- Role: Domestic counter-terrorism and specialized law enforcement
- Size: 200 personnel
- Part of: Narcotics Criminal Investigation Division
- Garrison/HQ: Bukit Aman Narcotics Criminal Investigations Department, Kuala Lumpur
- Nickname: STING

Commanders
- Current commander: SAC Dato' Roslan Wahid

Special Tactics and Intelligence Narcotics Group (STING) (Malay: Pasukan Khas Taktikal dan Perisikan Narkotik) are specialized to fight against organized drug lords as well as local and international drug smuggling syndicates. Formed January 30, 2014 and led by SAC Dato' Roslan Bin Wahid, an elite forces is made up of about 200 highly trained personnels (comprised 61 senior officers, 138 rank in files and one civil servants), and to date 60 of the best anti-narcotics officers, including 10 female officers, They will target the "sharks" of the drug trades, not a "small fry".

Formed on January 30, 2014, STING has given the police a big boost in the war against drugs in the country.

=== Missions ===
- February 9, 2015 – Combined STING and Penang Narcotics Crime Investigation Department team discovered an illegal drug processing lab. They seized heroin, kafein, various chemicals and drug processing instruments at Lebuh Sungai Pinang, Penang. Three men and a woman aged between ages 35 and 57 were arrested at the condominium. The team seized 48.1 kilograms of heroin, 1.99 kilograms of syabu, and five luxurious cars owned by members of the syndicate, which included Mercedes Benz, Volkswagen Beetle, Mitsubishi Attrage and a Vespa type motorcycle, as well as cash worth over RM790,000.
- May 26, 2015 – The overall drugs seized were 40.36 kilogrammes, namely syabu (34.76 kg), ecstasy pills (5.6 kg) with chemicals and processing equipment, worth a total of RM10 million.
- June 23, 2015 – STING arrested four suspects of African descent involved with drug distribution in a raid at Sungai Buluh and Damansara. The arrest also seized 7 kg of cocaine and 800g of methamphetamine.
- July 16, 2015 – STING team, with cooperation from Bukit Aman Narcotics CID and the Justice Investigation Bureau of Taiwan, arrested eight men, five of whom were from Taiwan, at a drug lab near Pandan Indah. The seizure was worth RM20mil. Among the drugs that were seized were Erimin 5 and cocaine with a combined weight of 207.8 kg.
- July 21, 2015 – Penang NCID with STING teams busted a drug processing and trafficking ring run by two of Penang's most notorious gangs, Sio Sam Ong and Gang 04, and seized 24.75 kg of heroin, worth RM1.5mil of drugs and cash. Three Sio Sam Ong members in charge of the trafficking were arrested while two Gang 04 members were nabbed as police unearthed a drug lab in Bayan Lepas.
- July 26, 2015 – Bukit Aman STING teams arrested 22 Pakistani citizens at Desa Melawati and Kuala Lumpur, and seized 34 kg of heroin during the raid.
- July 31, 2015 – STING and Penang NCID arrested three suspects in Penang, and seized more than 10 kg of heroin, 5 kg of Syabu, six pistols and one rifle. A raid later in the day arrested a further 14 suspects, who werefrom Vietnam, Singapore, and Thailand, and locals. They were all involved in the drug distribution syndicate.
- August 10, 2015 – STING arrested nine suspects believed to be syndicate members for a drug distribution ring at Bukit Kayu Hitam and Sungai Petani, Kedah. The arrest led to the seizure of 160 marijuana packs for distribution on the local market.
- August 21, 2015 – STING uncovered a drug lab and seized RM15m worth of liquid syabu at Bukit Mertajam, Penang. The raid also captured five syndicate members, three locals and two Iranian nationals. The seized liquid syabu weighed 324 kg.
- August 24, 2015 – STING raided six drug dens and arrested 81 addicts in Pokok Sena, Kedah. The raid, tagged Ops Sarang II, was a joint operation involving 160 officers and personnel from STING, state NCID, and other government agencies. 81 drug addicts (78 men and 3 women) were arrested with various drug offences during the operation. 9.66g of heroin, 2.27g of syabu, 1.3 kg of cannabis, 2 kg of ketum leaves and two liters of ketum juice were seized during the raid.
- August 28, 2015 – An international drug trafficking syndicate was busted when STING arrested three Nigerians and one local in a three-part raids. 58 compressed slabs of marijuana worth RM500,000 were seized.
- October 3, 2015 – A drug trafficking ring consisting of 14 Africans who posed as students was busted. STING teams raided eight places, which led to the crippling of the syndicate. The method of smuggling drugs was through dolls, shoes, and handbags. Police also seized 16 kg syabu, 250g of heroin, and 75g of cocaine. Their street value was estimated around RM5 million. All suspects will be investigated under Section 39(B) Dangerous Drug Act 1952.
- October 5, 2015 – Bukit Aman STING team arrested a drug kingpin and seized 469 kg of marijuana valued around RM1 million. Police subsequently arrested another three members of the syndicate and seized two MPV vehicles. The case is being investigated under Section 39B Dangerous Drugs Act 1952 and will be subjected to a mandatory death sentence if convicted.
- October 12, 2015 – 173 men were arrested for drug-related offences during a raid code named Ops Sarang, conducted at Kuantan with help from various agencies including Bukit Aman STING. 167g of heroin, 5g of marijuana, 112 yaba pills and RM2000 cash were among seized during the raid. five dealers were among the arrested; four of them were investigated under Section 39A(2) Dangerous Drugs Act 1952, and the other under Section 39A(1) Dangerous Drugs Act 1952.
- November 2, 2015 – Police STING teams seized 200 kg of ecstasy mixture and arrested 15 individuals in two separate raids in Jerantut, Pahang and Kuala Lumpur.
- November 5, 2015 – Police arrested four men, including three Nigerians, and seized 46 kg of drugs worth RM5m in a raid at Puchong. STING personnel discovered a pack of drugs hidden inside a woman's handbag which was believed to be smuggled into the country from the People's Republic of China.
- November 23, 2015 – STING teams seized four pistols, two shotguns and one airsoft gun in a raid.
- November 23, 2015 – Police busted a syndicate attempting to transport RM2m worth of syabu, using the Segway. STING personnels seized 10.2 kg worth of syabu and arrested two men from Nigeria and Republic De Guinea on November 23. The raid were conducted around Kajang.
- June 2, 2016 – STING officers arrested two suspects and seized 182 kg of drugs in Jelutong, Selangor.
- August 13, 2016 – STING officers busted a drug lab operating at an upmarket Ampang neighborhood and arrested twelve peoples (six Indian nationals) and seized 15 kg of syabu and a Glock pistol. The raid is based on intelligence in which the suspects were nabbed in a series of raid, leading up to the drug lab. KL Fire Department is called in to assist with dismantling and moving hazardous materials used for the drug lab.
- December 8, 2016 – Malaysian police crippled a China-linked ketamine distribution syndicate and uncovered a drug lab in Bukit Jalil. A raid spearheaded by STING seized 210 kg of China-made ketamine, and other drugs syabu, Eramine-5, ecstasy, and yaba pills worth RM15.5 million. Initial investigations revealed that the ketamine was intended for the local market, and could supply up to 540,000 addicts. All detained will be investigated under Section 39B, Dangerous Drugs Act 1952, which carries mandatory death penalty upon conviction.
- December 17, 2016 – Federal police's Special Tactical Intelligence Narcotics Group (STING) detained 87 peoples, including two foreigners and screened up to 150 peoples in a raid targeting entertainment outlets. Several types of drug, Eramine-5, ecstasy and ketamine were seized during the operation. The case is being investigated under Section 39A(1) and 39A(2) of the Dangerous Drugs Act 1952, which carries the punishment of imprisonment not less than five years, and not less than 10 strokes of caning.
- January 9, 2017 – In a massive three-days joint operation codenamed Ops Tapis Bersepadu sees police, federal STING unit, state Narcotics Criminal Investigation Department (NCID), Immigration department, Royal Malaysian Customs Department, Malaysian Maritime Enforcement Agency (MMEA) and National Anti-Drugs Agency (NADA) conducted checks on 452 individuals from various countries, and arrested 151 in the operation. The operation saw teams seizing heroin, meth, ketum and marijuana valued at RM2,929, an MPV with a fake Singaporean registration, and 974 smuggled alcoholic beverages.
- January 9, 2017 – The federal police unit, Special Tactical Intelligence Narcotics Group (STING) hauled more than 70 kg of drugs after it busted a drug lab and raided several location in Johor Bahru and Subang Jaya. Eleven peoples were arrested in the raid.
- January 18, 2017 – Bukit Aman's Special Tactical Intelligence Narcotics Group (STING) seized RM6.7 million worth of drugs in a two-day raid at five different location here at Kuala Lumpur. However, this success was marred by the fact that seven out of eight traffickers caught were policemen, including an Assistant Superintendent (ASP) attached with the Bukit Aman's Criminal Investigation Department (CID). 75 kg of syabu worth RM5.25 million and 7.4 million of heroin base worth RM740,000 were seized during the operation.
- February 1, 2017 – Bukit Aman's NCID and STING teams arrested a syndicate member carrying ten packets of tea bag with RM700,000 worth of drugs stuffed inside it at an ambush near Jelutong. Police believe that the suspect was going to hand over the drugs to another syndicate members at the time of the arrest. Case is being investigated under Section 39B Dangerous Drugs Act, which carries a mandatory death penalty upon conviction.
- July 15, 2017 – Police arrested 12 men including a local chemist and seized RM6.2 million worth of drugs along with pistols and hand grenade in 5 separate arrest at Johor Bahru. Bukit Aman's NCID and STING units spearheaded the arrest which saw 4 pistols, 140 bullets, and hand grenade captured. All arrested is being investigated under Section 39B Dangerous Drugs Act 1952 which carries a mandatory death penalty upon conviction.
- January 13, 2018 – Police recovered RM2.1 million in cash during raids to cripple a drug syndicate. The syndicate, which included a policeman, was taken down when officers from the Special Tactical Intelligence Narcotics Group (STING) and Bukit Aman's Narcotics Crime Investigation Department (NCID) conducted simultaneous raids across the country on 10th and 11 January. Drugs such as syabu, Eramin 5, ecstasy pills, as well as ganja were seized during the raids within the federal capital, and in Johor Bahru and Negri Sembilan. The policeman caught was a low-ranking policeman working in Kuala Lumpur and was believed to be the informant for the syndicate. The drugs have a street value of RM721,000 and all 8 suspect has been remanded.
- February 8, 2018 – Bukit Aman's Narcotic Crime Investigation Department (NCID) and Special Tactics Intelligence Narcotics Group (STING) put an end to a drug trafficking syndicate when the officers raided 5 locations in the Klang Valley, and arrested 7 suspects including a 42-year-old man believed to be the syndicate's mastermind. The teams seized 28.1 kg of ecstasy powder, 1.6 kg of syabu and 6690 yaba pills worth RM4.5m in the raids. Drug-making equipments were also seized during the raid.
- February 20, 2018 – Police have ended operations at a suspected meth labs and seized drugs valued at RM4.3m in 2 operations in Negri Sembilan and Selangor. A total of 16 suspect, including 5 Indian nationals were arrested. The raids were conducted by Bukit Aman's Narcotics Crime Investigation Department (NCID), Special Tactics Intelligence Narcotics Group (STING) and Selangor's NCID, which began on February 13. The first operation saw 84 kg of liquid meth, which could produce 33.6 kg of syabu and various tools and chemicals seized, and arrested 5 suspects while the second operation saw another 4 more suspect and 71.1 kg of drugs seized, 148.5 kg of liquid drugs, and other chemicals seized. The intelligence received from the operation saw the remaining 3 arrested in Taman Raintree, Batu Caves, and Ampang. 8 of the suspects were believed to be members of Gang 36 organized crime syndicate.
- March 6, 2018 – Police busted two major drug syndicates with drug valued at more than RM20mil seized. The raid was conducted by Special Tactical Intelligence Narcotics Group (STING) on both groups, with the first group raided in two houses in Ayer Keroh, and 3 suspect arrested. Over 200 kg of syabu packed and labelled as "high-grade Chinese tea" seized. The drugs have a street value of RM14.1m, and could cater up to a million addicts. The second group saw 3 vehicles and 2 suspects arrested, with over a variety of drugs, including 43.7 kg syabu, 31.4 kg of heroin, and about 180,000 ecstasy pills seized by the police. The drugs were estimated to have street value of RM6.2m. All suspects were arrested under Section 39B Dangerous Drugs Act, with mandatory death penalty upon conviction.
- May 4, 2018 – The Special Tactical Intelligence Narcotics Group (STING) has seized RM5.6 million worth of syabu and seized RM2.7 million cash in 6 separate raids in Penang and Kedah on Wednesday. Six syndicate members, including 2 Indonesian were also arrested in the raids. Bukit Aman's Narcotics Crime Investigation Department (NCID) director, Datuk Seri Mohamad Salleh said the drugs, weighing 92.6 kg were believed to be bound for Sumatra, Indonesia. In the first raid in Teluk Bahang, police seized all the syabu which were kept in a boat and arrested a man. In the follow-up raid in Bayan Lepas and Langkawi, the remaining 5 were arrested. All suspects will be investigated under Section 39B of the Dangerous Drugs Act 1952, which carries a mandatory death sentence upon conviction.
- June 23, 2018 – Bukit Aman STING and Johor Police Contingent NCID discovered three heroin processing laboratories and a drug store here that had 31.7 kg of heroin and other drugs. They also carried out four other raids, arresting eight people and seizing drugs worth RM640,000 in total, in the seven operations, all against one syndicate. Eight male suspects which consist of seven Malaysians between the ages of 28 and 59 and one Bangladeshi who was a chemist were arrested in seven raids in Bukit Indah, Taman Seri Yaakob, Mutiara Rini in Skudai, Kempas in Johor Baru and Taman Bukit Perdana, Batu Pahat. Police found three labs with simple equipment and one drug material store in Bukit Indah and Kempas in Johor Baru. Apart from heroin, police also found small amounts of ketamine, syabu and caffeine as well as seized eight cars worth a total of RM801,000. According to Bukit Aman NCID Director, Dato' Seri Mohamad Salleh, all suspects would be remanded until June 30 to allow investigations under Section 39B of the Dangerous Drugs Act 1952.

== STAGG ==
Special Task Force for Anti-Vice, Gambling and Gangsterism
- Pasukan Khas Anti Maksiat, Perjudian dan Gengsterisme
- Active: 7 December 2014–27 June 2018; 11 years
- Country: Malaysia
- Branch: Royal Malaysia Police
- Type: Police Tactical Unit
- Role: Domestic counter-terrorism and specialized law enforcement
- Size: 220 personnel
- Part of: Criminal Investigations Department
- Garrison/HQ: Bukit Aman Criminal Investigations Department, Kuala Lumpur
- Nickname: STAGG

Commanders
- Current commander: DCP Dato' Mohd Rodwan Mohd Yusof

Special Task Force for Anti-Vice, Gambling and Gangsterism (STAGG) (Malay: Pasukan Khas Anti Maksiat, Perjudian dan Gengsterisme) is a specialized unit tasked to target international and local underworld groups and gambling syndicates. The group joined the Special Tactics and Intelligence Narcotics Group (STING) and Special Task Force on Organised Crime (STAFOC), which were formed to bust drug rings and serious crimes. Formed on December 7, 2014, the squad comprised 61 senior officers, 139 rank in files and 20 civil servants, with Deputy Commissioner Dato' Mohd Rodwan Bin Mohd Yusof as its commander.

In 2018, 21 gambling syndicate operators have been detained under Prevention of Crime Act (POCA), and 34 operators in 2017 as part of Bukit Aman crackdown. Bukit Aman's Secret Societies, Gambling, and Vice Division (D7) alongside Special Task Force for Anti-Vice, Gambling and Gangsterism (STAGG) conducted over 18,541 raids and seized 90,139 gambling machines nationwide in 2017. Bukit Aman CID chief, Datuk Seri Wan Ahmad Najmuddin added that police is facing an uphill battle with the advent of online gambling. He also mentioned some operators have a switch at their outlet that can convert gambling machines into normal computers in the event of a raid.

It is learnt that some illegal gambling machine center caretakers or personnels are given compensation by their bosses for getting detained. "The caretaker and his family will be taken care of during his incarceration", said a source.

=== Missions ===
- January 31, 2015 – STAGG and Penang Police Contingent Headquarters busted online gambling at Lorong Madras, Persiaran Gurney and Pulau Tikus. In the three-hour operation and ended at 2 am, police seized 190 simulator machines with gambling features worth RM950,000, including cash amounting to RM15,949 and tokens worth RM44,980 in raids at five family entertainment centres. One hundred and seventy-two customers and 28 workers of the outlets aged between 18 and 70 were arrested.
- February 15, 2016 – Combined STAGG and Johore Police Contingent Headquarters team raided 21 illegal online gambling dens in the three-hour operation which began at 10.30pm. The operation was carried out at various locations in Johor Baru involving more than 100 police personnel comprising a team from Iskandar Puteri, Seri Alam, and the Johor Baru Central district police headquarters. They seized gambling simulator machines, electronic equipment worth more than RM1 million, as well as RM8,889 cash in several raids at Nusa Perintis Street, which is a commercial area in Gelang Patah, was fronting as a frozen food business operator. 37 online gambling operators as well as 103 punters, some of whom were foreign workers were arrested in an operations.
- December 15, 2016 – Police federal unit Special Task force for anti-vice, gambling, and gangsterism (STAGG) busted 3 major gambling syndicates with the arrest of 20 agents in simultaneous raids at 14 premises. Cash total up to RM11,385, 32 cellphones, a printer, 2 mobile printer, 14 calculators, and 29 betting slip were seized during the operation. Initial investigation shows that the 3 syndicates are able to process bets up to RM15,000 daily, and RM180,000 monthly.
- January 26, 2017 – Police "unearthed" about 38 foreign female guest relations officer (GRO) who were hiding in underground rooms during a raid at an entertainment outlet in Medan Ipoh here. The operation were conducted by Bukit Aman's STAGG saw GRO hiding in underground room, which uses hydraulic systems to lock the metal door. The fire department were called in to assist in breaking open the place. A total of 15 employees and 15 customers were arrested to facilitate investigations.
- July 5, 2017 – Leader of a local triad, Double Seven (77) was arrested by Bukit Aman, at Seremban. The suspect is a 47-year-old local, also a Datuk title holder, who was arrested in Ops Cantas Khas led by STAGG unit. He is arrested for involvement in a triad while also to assist in a criminal case in Chenderiang, Perak.
- January 20, 2018 – STAGG team raided an entertainment outlet which has been converted into a mini casino and arrested 27 individuals, with 15 guest relations officer (GRO) among the list. The casino was found to be active on weekends while the prostitutes were found to be abusing social visit pass and all of them were arrested under Section 7(2) Common Gaming Houses 1953, and Section 6(1) Immigration Act 1959/63.
- May 22, 2018 – STAGG raided 5 illegal online gambling centers in Klang, arresting 15 people and seizing dozens of computers. Sources said that the premises were making RM7000 to RM15000 a week. The operation was carried out with 36 STAGG operatives divided into teams to conduct raid on all 5 premises simultaneously.

== Equipment ==
=== Uniforms ===
STAFOC/STING/STAGG members always operate in standard black or blue tactical uniforms worn by the other counter-terrorism forces. Fire retardant balaclavas are often used to protect their faces as well as protect their identities. Both units commonly use the standard American PASGT helmets or Marine Ops-Core helmets. These tactical vests are labelled with "POLIS" (meaning "POLICE" in Malays), or RMP insignia, to allow for easy identification.

=== Weapons ===
The basic gear for every STAFOC/STING/STAGG officer is a standard sidearm and a submachine gun. STAFOC/STING/STAGG also uses other weaponry including rifles, sniper rifles, and even machine guns (in some units), depending on the situation.

Unlike in other police institutions, members are not bound to normal procurement policies and can order the equipment they feel the best for their mission.

The following are the common weapons used by STAFOC/STING/STAGG:

- Beretta Px4 Storm
- Glock 19
- Glock 26
- SIG Sauer P226
- SIG Sauer P2022
- Walther P99
- CZ Scorpion Evo 3
- Heckler & Koch MP5
- Various shotguns and bolt action sniper rifles

== Notable Missions/Investigations ==
=== Murder of Kevin Morais ===
Datuk Anthony Kevin Morais, DPMP, was a Deputy Public Prosecutor for the Attorney General's Chambers of Malaysia and Malaysian Anti-Corruption Commission (MACC). At first, he is filed as a missing person by his younger brother. STAFOC is directly involved in the investigation. Under STAFOC interrogations, the sixth accused revealed the locations of the body of Kevin Morais. The case is still in court as in February 2018.

=== Assassination of Kim Jong-nam ===
Kim Jong-nam was the eldest son of North Korean former general secretary Kim Jong-il and half-brother of the North Korean chairman, Kim Jong-un. He was assassinated in Kuala Lumpur International Airport 2 (KLIA2) while travelling from Macau by two assailants using VX nerve agent. Because of this is a high-profile case, STAFOC was tasked as a security forces.

INTERNATIONAL CASE

=== Ops Cantas Khas ===
Ops Cantas Khas (lit. Special Lop Operation) is an operation by the Royal Malaysia Police to hunt down 'big fish' in organised crime syndicate and gangsterism in Malaysia. The operation caught Malaysian eyes after it is revealed about involvement of five high status citizen (VIP, Datuks etc.) in the organised crime syndicate and gangsterism. The operation is spearheaded by STAGG&STAFOC.

== Dissolution ==
With the defeat of the Barisan Nasional party in the 2018 General Election, under the new Pakatan Harapan government, the Royal Malaysia Police (RMP) is reformed. On 11 June 2018, among leaked information from an unnamed sources is the dissolution of three police tactical unit which is STING, STAGG and STAFOC. The reason of the dissolution is not stated, however it is rumored that this young special units are involved in corruptions and protecting the criminals. This rumor is later denied by the Home Affairs Minister, Tan Sri Muhyiddin Yassin.

On 26 June 2018, the dissolution is confirmed by the Home Affairs Minister and the Inspector General of Police, Tan Sri Mohamad Fuzi Harun. However, the Home Affairs Minister gives two weeks to the RMP to come up with any proposals regarding the units or the dissolution before the decision of the dissolution is finalised.
