= Kalimuthu =

Kalimuthu is a Tamil name and may refer to

- K. Kalimuthu, Indian politician.
- P. Kalimuthu, Malaysian gangster.
- Mathavakannan Kalimuthu, Singaporean ex-convict.
