= 2011 Muar kindergarten hostage crisis =

Malaysian hostage-taking incident

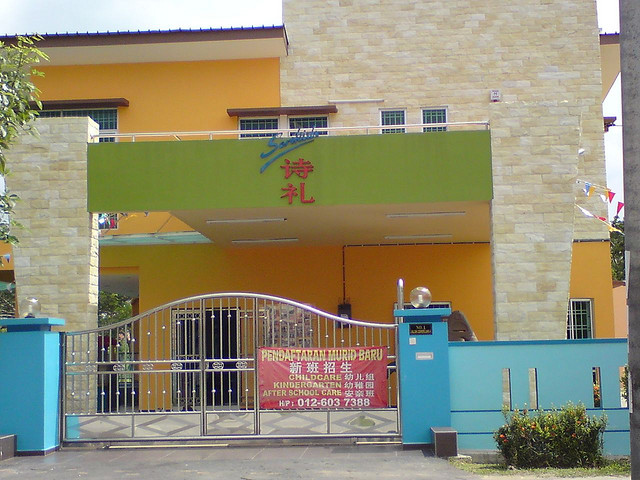
- Tadika Seri Intan as on 2021
- Location: 2.0568143°N 102.5802866°E; Serikids Kindergarten (now Tadika Seri Intan), 1, Jalan Cemerlang 4, Taman Cemerlang II, Sungai Abong, Muar, Johor, Malaysia
- Date: 7 July 2011 (MST, UTC+8)
- Attack type: Hostage taking, knife attack, school attack
- Weapons: Machete and hammer
- Deaths: 1 (one of the perpetrators)
- Injuries: 0
- Victims: 30 preschool children and four teachers
- Perpetrator: Lau Hui Chung @ Loi Hui Chung @ Ah Teong (dead)
- Motive: Illogical demands of the alleged mentally-deranged and drug addict hostage taker including for an automatic gun and to meet the Prime Minister

The 2011 Muar kindergarten hostage crisis took place at the Serikids Kindergarten in Muar, Johor, Malaysia on 7 July 2011. (Note: Suspect in kindie hostage drama dies.) About 30 preschool children aged between 2 and 6 years old and four teachers of the kindergarten in Sungai Abong were held hostage starting at 9:15 a.m. Malaysian time (UTC+8), by Lau Hui Chung, also known as Loi Hui Chung and Ah Teong, aged 40, who had barged into the double-storey building wielding a machete and hammer, and was suspected to be mentally deranged and a drug addict. The siege began when police arrived at 10:00 a.m. after receiving a tip-off. He threatened to kill the hostages if his demand to negotiate with the Prime Minister and be given a gun was not met. He was reported to be emotional and suicidal at times. (Note: Teacher: He asked me to kill him.)

The Special Actions Unit or Unit Tindakan Khas (UTK) of the Royal Malaysia Police (RMP), firetruck and ambulance were deployed on stand-by to face the crisis amid police's negotiation and persuasion effort by suspect family members. The over six-hour stand-off ended exactly at 4:00 p.m. after UTK members stormed the building at 3:40 p.m. with tear gas and shot the suspect in the head. The suspect was taken to the nearby Sultanah Fatimah Specialist Hospital (HPSF) where he was pronounced dead at 9:15 p.m. All 30 kindergarten children and four teachers were unharmed. The police have investigated a possible connection of the dead suspect with two other similar kindergarten attack cases within the same vicinity earlier, namely Warna Sari Kindergarten on 12 January 2009 and Senario Kindergarten on 10 March 2010. The incident has received nationwide and international media coverage. The police have also instructed kindergartens and day-care centres in the area to tighten their security following the hostage drama. The kindergarten involved was re-opened a week after the incident.

== See also ==
- Special Actions Unit (Malaysia) - Publicly known missions
- List of hostage crises
- List of unsuccessful attacks related to schools
- List of attacks related to primary school and kindergarten incidents
- List of school-related attacks
