= Mas Selamat Kastari =

Singaporean Islamist fugative

- Picture taken from Interpol website
- Born: 23 January 1961 (age 65); Kendal, Central Java, Indonesia
- Occupations: Former bus mechanic, alleged head of the Singapore branch of Jemaah Islamiyah
- Children: 6
- Status: Arrested and held by Internal Security Department, under the Internal Security Act
- Criminal charge: None

Mas Selamat Kastari (born 23 January 1961) is a Singaporean who was, for more than a year, Singapore's most-wanted fugitive after escaping from detention on 27 February 2008. The search for him has been described as the largest manhunt ever launched in Singapore. He was eventually recaptured in Skudai, Malaysia, on 1 April 2009, over a year after his escape, and has since been returned to Singapore. His escape was found to be one of the events in Singapore's history that Singaporeans were most aware of, with 95% being aware of it.

In January 2006, Mas Selamat was arrested by Indonesian anti-terror squads in Java and deported to Singapore. He was suspected of plotting to bomb Singapore Changi Airport in January 2002, and, according to the Singapore Police Force, he had initially planned to do so by crashing a plane into the airport. However, Mas Selamat has never been formally charged with any terrorism-related offences; instead, he was detained under the country's Internal Security Act, which allows indefinite detention without trial.

== Early life ==
Born in 1961 in Kendal, Central Java, in Indonesia, Mas Selamat grew up in Kaki Bukit in Singapore leading a typical childhood kampung life. He attended the Kaki Bukit Primary School, and was known simply as "Selamat" to his neighbors. In the early 1980s, Mas Selamat moved to a flat in Bedok Reservoir where he married and had five children.

== Involvement with Jemaah Islamiah ==
Mas Selamat is believed to have begun his involvement with Jemaah Islamiah (JI) in the 1990s upon joining Darul Islam, a precursor movement to the JI group. By 1992, he had joined the Singapore JI cell, and was sent to Afghanistan for training a year later. In 1998, he studied the Taliban system of government and returned home 'deeply impressed'.

According to Singapore intelligence authorities, Mas Selamat has met Hambali, the leader of JI, and discussed various terror plots including hijacking a plane from Bangkok and crashing it into Singapore Changi Airport. He escaped from Singapore in 2001 before authorities conducted a massive operation to arrest 13 suspected JI members in December 2001.

== Arrests ==
Mas Selamat had earlier been arrested in February 2003 in the island of Bintan, Indonesia, to assist Indonesian police in their investigations of several bombings in Indonesia in 2001 and 2002. Mas Selamat had changed his identity, assuming the name of Edi Heriyanto and obtained an Indonesian passport. Found in his possession was literature on making bombs and the virtue of suicide. He was jailed for 18 months in 2003 for immigration offences. He was, however, not handed over to Singapore upon his release, since Indonesia and Singapore did not yet have an extradition treaty. During this period of imprisonment, he broke his left leg in a botched attempt to escape when he jumped from a high floor, resulting in him walking with a permanent limp.

On 20 January 2006, he was arrested again for using a fake identity card in Java, where he was visiting his son who was said to be studying at a religious school there. Singapore requested Mas Selamat's extradition and was handed over on 3 February 2006, being detained in Singapore under the Internal Security Act without trial. The Malaysian intelligence authorities also wanted to question Mas Selamat who had made frequent visits to Johor before fleeing to Indonesia.

== Escape in February 2008 ==
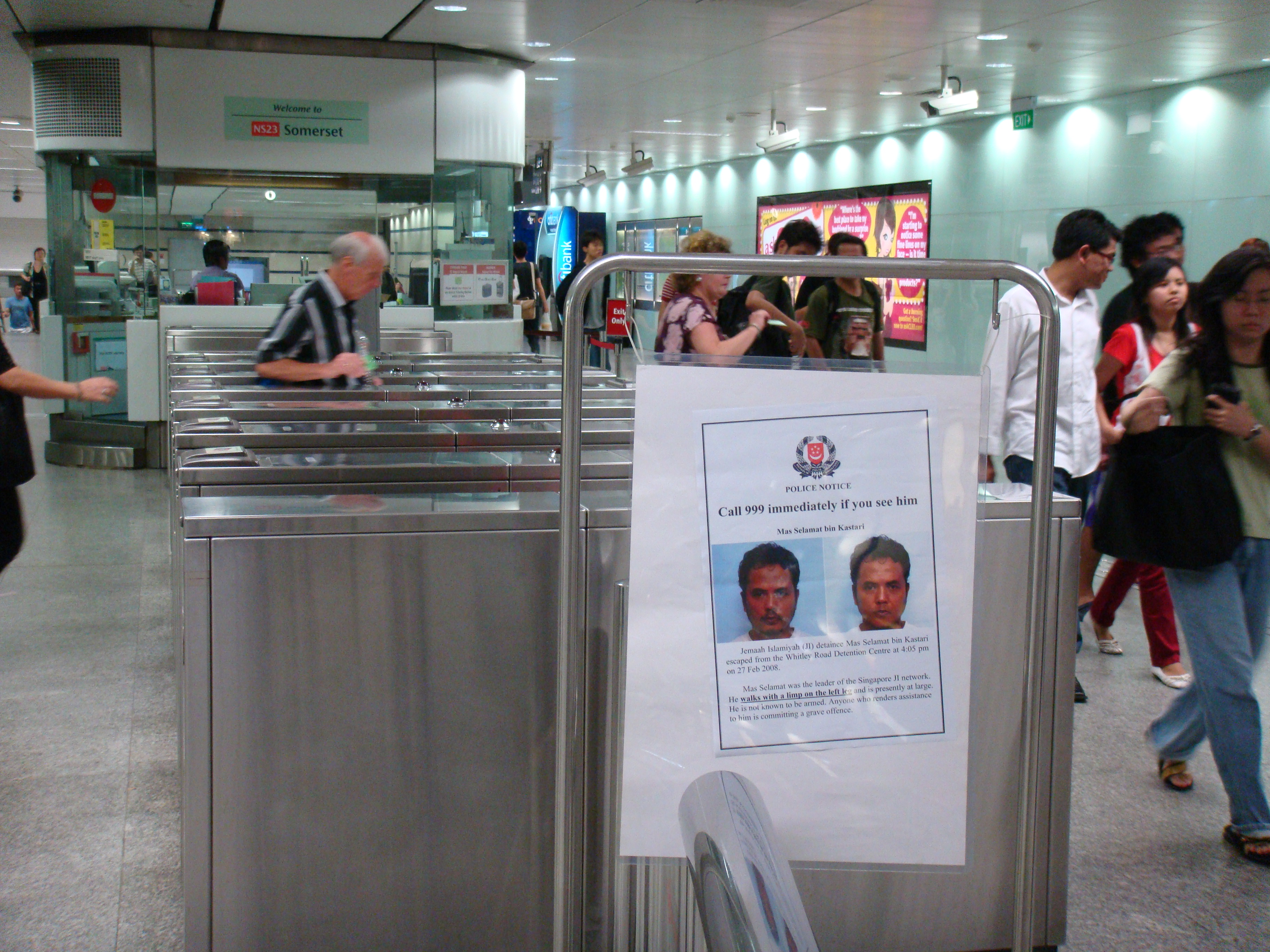
Wanted posters were visible everywhere in Singapore after his escape, such as this one at Somerset MRT station.

At 4:05 pm on Wednesday, 27 February 2008, the JI leader escaped from the Internal Security Department's Whitley Road Detention Centre where he was being detained. His family were visiting him at the time, and he was being led to a room to meet them when he asked to go to the toilet. He then fled. A massive manhunt comprising personnel from the Singapore Police Force, the Gurkha Contingent, the Singapore Armed Forces, the Police Tactical Unit and the Police National Service Key Installation Protection Unit were deployed in the vicinity of the area immediately after the escape. They were later aided by members of the Singapore Guards and the Singapore Armed Forces Military Police Command, before the operation was wound down over 17 hours later without success in locating the fugitive, who was believed to be unarmed.

Authorities said security was very tight at the detention centre and conducted an independent study to determine how the fugitive escaped. Deputy Prime Minister Wong Kan Seng acknowledged that a security lapse led to his escape, and that everything was being done to recapture Mas Selamat. The Onraet Road facility has armed guards, high wire fences and CCTV cameras. Reactions to the escape were filled with surprise and disbelief in what Western observers describe as a country where "security breaches are virtually unheard of". It brought serious embarrassment to the Singapore government, and many questions raised by the public and the press. Security around the schools in the area was also beefed up to assure worried parents. Indonesia and Malaysia announced that they stepped up their own border security in the wake of this incident. Government authorities received more than 1100 calls on sightings of Mas Selamat. The earliest sighting of him was in a back road near MacRitchie Reservoir leading to Toa Payoh Lorong 1, right behind Braddell View Estates.

An urgent worldwide security alert, or Orange Notice, was issued by INTERPOL to each of its 186 National Central Bureaus following a request from Singapore. The alert was later changed to red.

Wanted posters of Mas Selamat were put up in shopping centers, buses, train stations, and schools islandwide to appeal for the public to inform police should they spot him, and leaflets given out by volunteers to members of the public. The three telecommunications companies in Singapore sent out Multimedia Messaging Service (MMS) messages starting on 1 March 2008 to all 5.5 million subscribers with Mas Selamat's photograph, as well as email messages to SingNet Internet users. The MMS read, "Please call 999 immediately if you see Mas Selamat bin Kastari. He is short (1.58m tall) and limps on his left leg. Thank you." Lockdowns at border and immigration checkpoints also resulted in much longer queues for people leaving Singapore.

There were conflicting reports on the whereabouts of Mas Selamat. While Singaporean police initially believed that he remained in Singapore, others such as Malaysia's The Star reported that he may have fled to Indonesia via a speedboat ride.

On 21 July 2008, a cash reward of one million dollars was offered for information leading to the apprehension of Mas Selamat. The million dollar reward was put up by two private individuals who had approached the Home Affairs Ministry, wishing to remain anonymous.

=== Public reaction ===
Agence France-Presse noted, "Terrorism is usually no laughing matter, especially not in security-conscious Singapore, but the escape from custody of a limping Islamist extremist suspect has led to scorn on the Internet." Online critics also accused the pro-government media of trying to downplay the incident and skirting key issues. Speculations and conspiracy theories abounded in Internet chatrooms and blogs, such as that Mas Selamat had died in detention or that he was purposefully let out in order to allow authorities to search for other terrorists.

Criticism has been directed towards Wong Kan Seng, the Minister of Home Affairs in Singapore, with regards to the fact that news of Mas Selamat's escape was not disseminated to the public until four hours after its occurrence. The public were not given any details until the next day at a parliamentary session. Wong then had cited a serious security lapse as the reason for the escape and revealed that Mas Selamat escaped when he was being taken to the toilet before a meeting at the Family Visit Room.

On 2 March 2008, it was announced that an independent Committee of Inquiry, chaired by former judge Goh Joon Seng, would be set up to find out how the escape occurred.

=== Accountability ===
Nine individuals, including the commander and his superior holding a rank equivalent to brigadier general, were penalised for lapses that allowed Mas Selamat to escape from the Whitley Road detention centre.

=== Findings of investigation ===
On 21 April 2008, the only findings of the Committee of Inquiry were released in a Parliament of Singapore session. It was announced that he escaped through an unsecured bathroom window. The Committee attributed the escape to three critical factors – first, the lack of grilles where the window was located; second, Mas Selamat being allowed to close the toilet door on the guards, thus avoiding detection during his escape and third, a physical weakness at the perimeter fencing outside the visitation centre.

Additionally, the report stated that a re-enactment of the potential escape route would have taken 49 seconds to escape through the window and clear the perimeter fencing, with another 2 minutes and 44 seconds to reach the Pan Island Expressway located next to the detention centre. Mas Selamat had turned on the water tap after closing the toilet door and the guards on duty only acted on their suspicions 11 minutes after this incident. It is believed that Mas Selamat could have been gone for some time at that point.

It was later revealed that Mas Selamat had used an improvised flotation device to cross the Straits of Johor into Malaysia.

=== Apparent misidentification ===
On 7 August 2008, a man 'limping like' Mas Selamat was arrested by Indonesian police at Buluh Tumbang Airport in Tanjung Pandan, Belitung. The man claimed to be an educational book salesman and not the fugitive in question. The man was later released.

== Capture ==
On 8 May 2009, the media in Singapore reported that Mas Selamat had been captured by Malaysian authorities in Johor, Malaysia. This report was later confirmed by both the Singapore and Malaysian governments, with the date of capture given as 1 April 2009. Malaysian Home Minister Hishammuddin Hussein confirmed that Mas Selamat was being held under the Internal Security Act, saying that he was "planning something, which allowed us to arrest him". Hishammuddin declined to give details, since the case is sensitive as it involves intelligence agencies of Singapore, Indonesia as well as Malaysia. Inspector-General of Malaysian Police Musa Hassan said that the arrest was made possible as the involved parties had been sharing intelligence reports since his escape.

According to the media, Mas Selamat was captured in the early morning of 1 April in a secluded house in Kampung Tawakal, an obscure village with a population of less than 100 in Skudai, 25 kilometres (16 mi) northwest of Johor Bahru. According to witness, Mohd Saat Marjo, 57, a villager who lived opposite the fugitive's home, about 40 personnels from the Royal Malaysian Police—such as the Special Actions Unit (Pasukan Gerakan Khas A-Detachment; UTK) and Special Branch members—broke through two doors and rushed into the house, where Mas Selamat refused to come out and surrender when ordered by the police. Mas Selamat resided in the house's refurbished basement, while his landlord, known only as "Johar", and Johar's wife and two children, resided in the upper portions of the house. Prior to his arrest, Mas Selamat had limited contact with outsiders, even avoiding prayers at the local surau, but had been witnessed tending to the compound's garden. Villagers in Kampung Tawakal expressed shock of Mas Selamat's presence after his identity was made known to the public.

Several people who had helped Mas Selamat to hide in the country, including Johar, were arrested along with him, and the news of the arrest was undisclosed for weeks to enable investigations into his network in Malaysia. Immediately after his arrest, the house Mas Selamat resided in and its surroundings were combed for explosives.

Mas Selamat was transferred back to Singapore for indefinite detention under the Internal Security Act on 24 September 2010.

== Subsequent fate ==
As of December 2021, Mas Selamat remains imprisoned indefinitely without charge, under the Internal Security Act while still "deeply entrenched in (his) radical beliefs". Singaporean authorities maintain that Mas Selamat still poses an imminent threat to public security, making it unlikely that he will ever be released, notwithstanding the absence of any criminal charges.

It was further revealed that Mas Selamat's eldest son, Masyhadi bin Mas Selamat (alias Muhammad Hanif), was also part of the Jemaah Islamiyah and has also been detained without charges since his arrest in Indonesia in 2013.
