= Mohd Zaman Khan =

Malaysian police officer (1941–2021)

Yang Berbahagia Tan Sri Dato' Mohd Zaman Khan PSM PSD SPSK DSAP DMPN PGPP JMN DNS KMN

Commissioner General of Malaysian Prison Department
- In office 9 February 1994 – 31 December 1997
- Preceded by: Mohd Yassin Jaafar
- Succeeded by: Omar Mohamed Dan

Director of Bukit Aman Criminal Investigation Department
- In office 1989–1994

Director of Bukit Aman Internal Security and Public Order Department
- In office August 1987 – 1989

Personal details
- Born: 21 December 1941 Pasir Mas, Kelantan, Japanese occupation of Malaya
- Died: 11 September 2021 (aged 79) National Heart Institute, Kuala Lumpur
- Resting place: Bukit Kiara Muslim Cemetery, Kuala Lumpur
- Spouse: Puan Sri Datin Seri Rosnah Ahmad
- Children: 5

Tan Sri Mohd Zaman Khan bin Rahim Khan (21 December 1941 – 11 September 2021) was a former Malaysian police officer.

He was well known for handling many high-profile cases in the 1990s, such as the Mona Fandey murder case, bringing down local gangster P. Kalimuthu (Bentong Kali), and helping to coordinate rescue efforts during the Highland Towers apartment collapse.

== Early life and education ==
Mohd Zaman Khan was born on 21 December 1941 at Pasir Mas, Kelantan. He was educated at Victoria Institution in 1959.

== Police career ==
He joined the Royal Federation of Malaya Police as a Cadet Assistant Superintendent of Police on 1 June 1962, he later attended a Special Course on Policing in America in 1969.

He was the District Police Chief in different places such as Batu Gajah, Grik, Klang and Georgetown (1964–1972). Later, he was promoted to Head of Traffic Department in Kuala Lumpur (1972–1974), District Police Chief in Petaling Jaya (1974), Head of Selangor Criminal Investigation Department (1975–1977), Negeri Sembilan Police Chief (1977–1979), Penang Police Chief (1979–1984) and was later promoted as Kuala Lumpur Police Chief (1984–July 1987) and his deputy at that time was SAC (Rtd.) Dato' Ahmad Tajuddin Shahabudin.

Subsequently, he was promoted to Director of Internal Security and Public Order Department at the Bukit Aman Police Headquarters (August 1987 – 1989) and was later transferred as the Director of Criminal Investigation Department at the Bukit Aman Police Headquarters from 20 November 1989 to 1994. He also conducted operations on the arrest of Bentong Kali or also known as P. Kalimutu, and his last position before his retirement from the security forces was Director-General of the Prisons Department (1994–1997).

He was also involved in the rescue operation of the victims of the Highland Towers Tragedy.

== Death ==
Mohd Zaman Khan died at the National Heart Institute, Kuala Lumpur on 11 September 2021 and was buried at the Bukit Kiara Muslim Cemetery.

== Honours ==
- Malaysia
  - Commander of the Order of Loyalty to the Crown of Malaysia (PSM) – Tan Sri (2011)
  - Commander of the Order of Loyalty to the Royal Family of Malaysia (PSD) – Datuk (1984)
  - Companion of the Order of the Defender of the Realm (JMN) (1990)
  - Officer of the Order of the Defender of the Realm (KMN) (1975)
- Royal Malaysia Police
  - Courageous Commander of the Most Gallant Police Order (PGPP) (1996)
  - Recipient of the National Hero Service Medal (PJPN) (2019)
- Kelantan
  - Knight Grand Commander of the Order of Loyalty to the Crown of Kelantan (SPSK) – Dato' (2015)
- Negeri Sembilan
  - Companion of the Order of Loyalty to Negeri Sembilan (DNS) (1980)
- Pahang
  - Knight Companion of the Order of Sultan Ahmad Shah of Pahang (DSAP) – Dato' (1986)
- Penang
  - Companion of the Order of the Defender of State (DMPN) – Dato' (1984)
