= Bukit Aman =

Malaysian police headquarters in Kuala Lumpur

Royal Malaysia Police Headquarters
- Ibu Pejabat Polis Diraja Malaysia
- Lembah Pantai, Kuala Lumpur in Malaysia
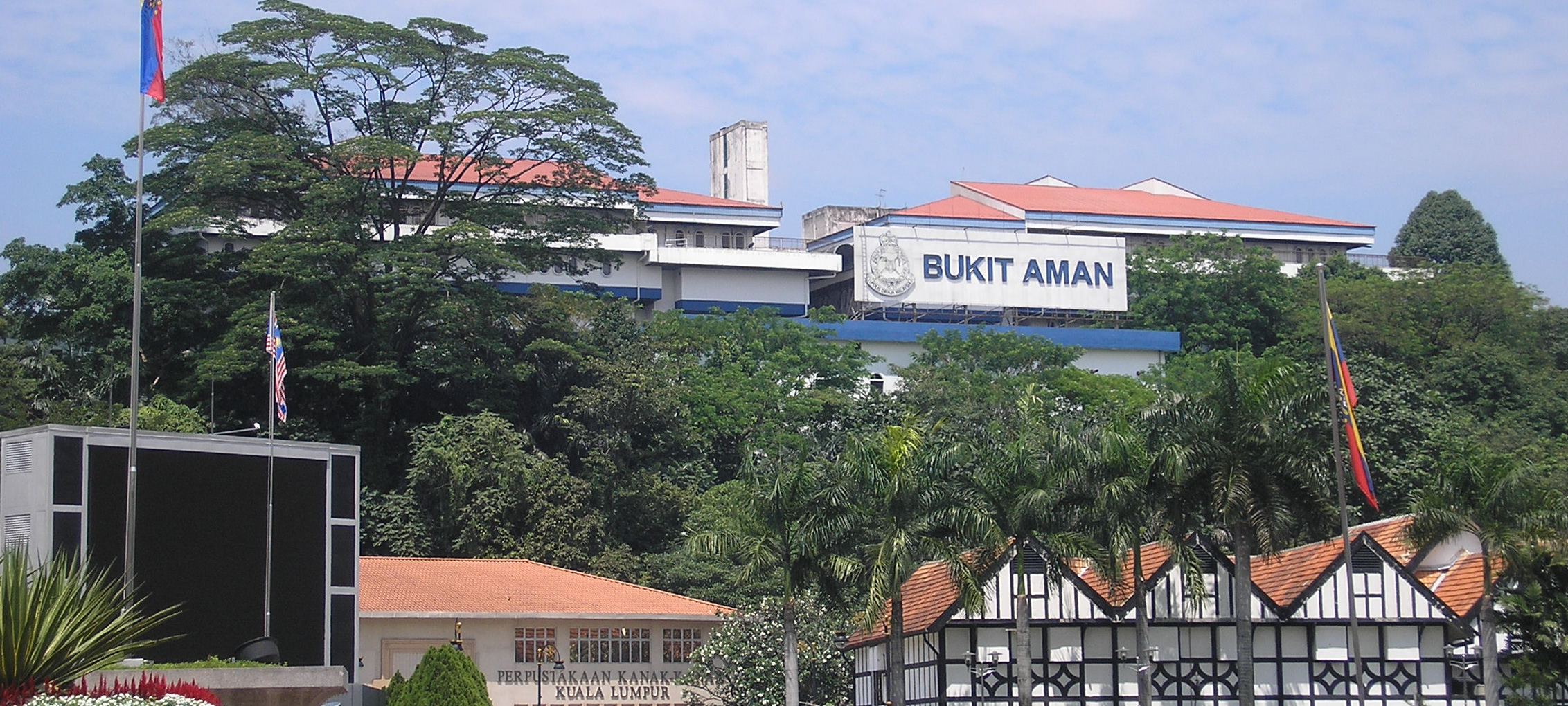
- Bukit Aman as seen from the bottom of the hill.

Site information
- Owner: Ministry of Home Affairs
- Controlled by: Royal Malaysia Police

Location
- Coordinates: 3.148107°N 101.688181°E

Site history
- In use: 1871–present
- Battles/wars: Selangor Civil War

Garrison information
- Garrison: Special Operations Command; Special Actions Unit; Bukit Aman Transportation Branch
- Occupants: Inspector-General of Police; Deputy Inspector-General of Police

Bukit Aman (officially Ibu Pejabat Polis Diraja Malaysia) is a metonym for a large area that serves as the Royal Malaysia Police headquarters and has several police complexes. It is situated on a hill in Kuala Lumpur known as Bukit Ayang (later renamed Bukit Aman, which translates as 'Peace Hill') and houses several buildings that serve as the headquarters for some departments of the Royal Malaysia Police. The Malaysia Control Centre, a national level command and control facility, is also located here.

== History ==
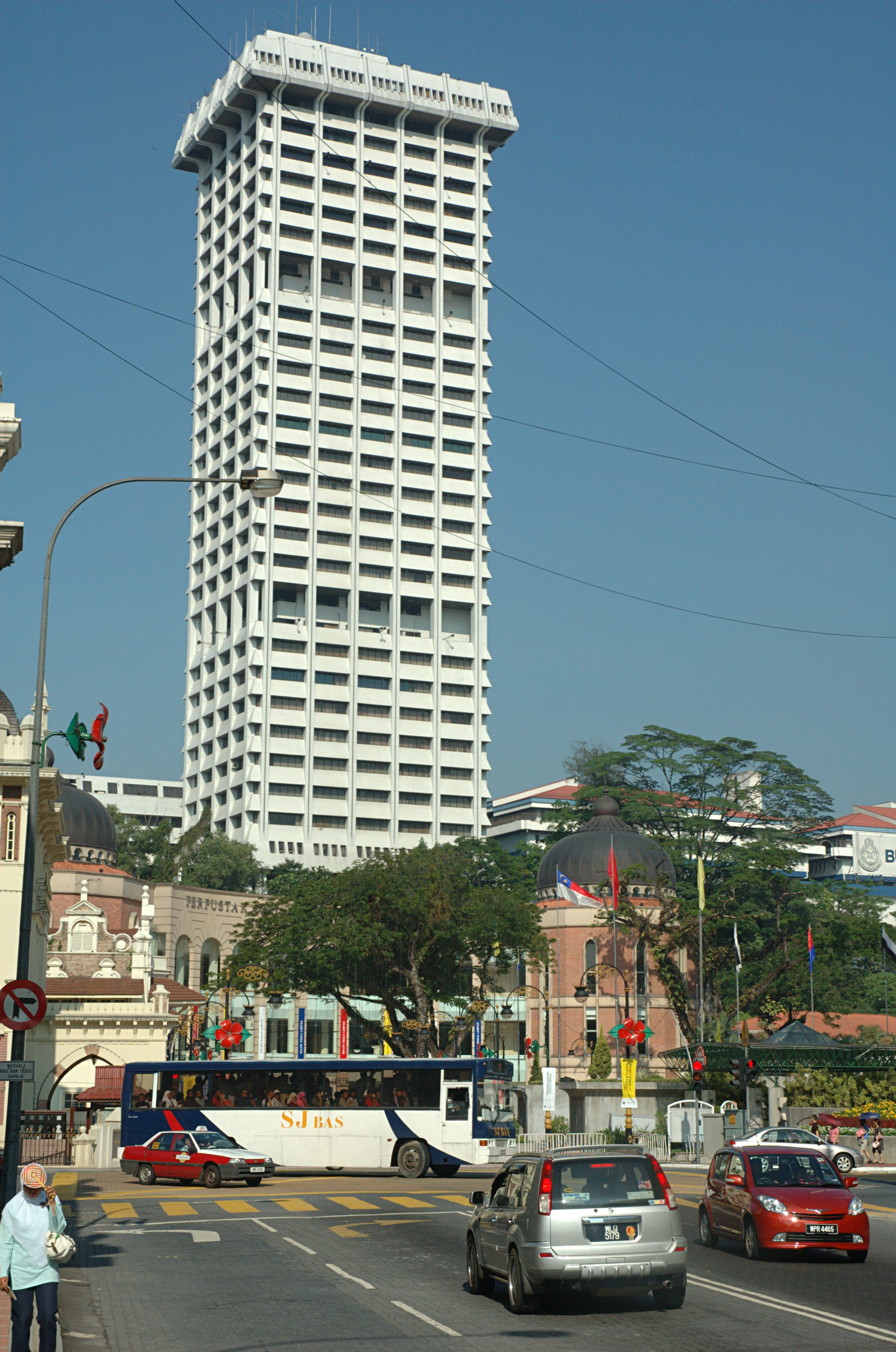
RMP Bukit Aman Tower 2 is one of three high-rise building in Bukit Aman.

=== 1870s–1896 ===
Bukit Aman was a police station for the Selangor Military Police Force (SMPF) and was known as Bluff Hill. The police station was built around 1871 and serves as the SMPF's Kuala Lumpur district headquarters. Bluff Hill Police Station was involved in the Selangor Civil War and was captured by rebel forces in 1872. Bluff Hill Police Station was later renamed Bluff Road Police Station. Captain Charles Henry Syers, the SMPF Commissioner of Police, relocated the SMPF's Headquarters from Klang to Kuala Lumpur in 1882, after Kuala Lumpur grew into a larger city as a result of tin mining activities. At the time, SMPF had two police stations in Kuala Lumpur: Bluff Road Police Station and Central Police Station (located at the Pudu Road-Cross Road intersection), and Bluff Road was chosen as the headquarters.

=== 1896–1940s ===
On 1 July 1896, all state police for the Federated Malay States' states were merged into the Federated Malay States Police (FMSP), and the headquarters of SMPF were converted into the headquarters of FMSP. A police training depot was established here in October 1903. Two of the first police departments were established here in 1908: the Detective Branch and the Criminal Record Registration Branch. The training depot was relocated to Riffle Range Road in 1940, and it is now known as PULAPOL.

=== During WWII ===
During WWII, Bluff Road Police Station served as a command centre for Malaya Command in order to defend the Malay Peninsula. After the Imperial Japanese Army had taken over Malaya, the FMSP withdrew from Selangor and temporarily relocated to Singapore. During the Japanese occupation of Malaya, the Bluff Road Police Station served as the Imperial Japanese Army's headquarters in Malaya.

=== Post-WWII ===
Bluff Road Police Station was returned to the British Administration after the Imperial Japanese Army surrendered. It later became the headquarters of the Malayan Union Police, and after Malaya gained independence from the United Kingdom, it became the headquarters of the Federation Police Force (Malay: Pasukan Polis Tanah Melayu). The name of Bluff Hill has been reverted to its pre-colonial era, Bukit Ayang; however, the Bluff Road Police Station has retained its name.

Tun Mohammed Hanif Omar, the then-Inspector-General of Police, renamed Bluff Road Police Station to Ibu Pejabat Polis Diraja Malaysia, Bukit Aman on 25 March 1975.

== Tenants ==
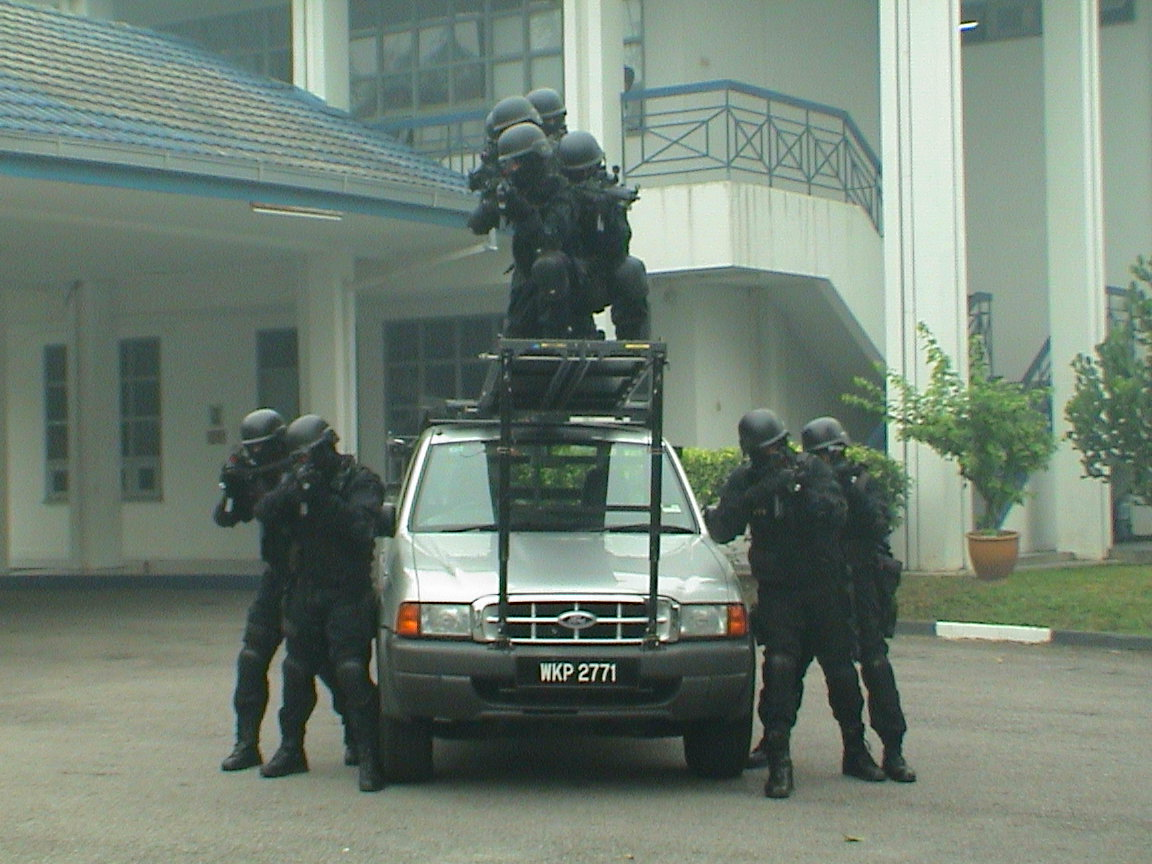
Operatives of the Special Actions Unit pose in front of the Special Operations Training Facility in Bukit Aman.

The offices of the Inspector-General of Police, Deputy Inspector-General of Police, and Directors of various Police Departments are located in Bukit Aman.

The following police departments have their headquarters here:

- Management Department
- Criminal Investigation Department
- Internal Security and Public Order Department
- Narcotics Crime Investigation Department
- Commercial Crime Investigation Department
- Special Branch

Aside from the large police departments mentioned above, Bukit Aman has several police units stationed here, including:

- Special Operations Command (Malay: Pasukan Gerakan Khas)
  - Special Actions Unit
- Bukit Aman Transportation Branch (Malay: Cawangan Pengangkutan Bukit Aman)
- Bukit Aman Training Section (Malay: Bahagian Latihan Bukit Aman)
