= Bentong Kali =

Malaysian criminal and gangster (1961–1993)

- Mugshot of Bentong Kali
- Born: Kalimuthu s/o Pakirisamy Thevar; 22 January 1961; Bentong, Pahang, Federation of Malaya (now Malaysia)
- Died: 29 June 1993 (aged 32); Medan Damansara, Kuala Lumpur, Malaysia
- Cause of death: Gunshot wounds
- Occupations: Gangster, drug-trafficking, criminal, racketeer, founder of Indian Gang 08.
- Criminal charge: Multiple homicide

Kalimuthu s/o Pakirisamy Thevar or P. Kalimuthu (22 January 1961 – 29 June 1993), known professionally as Bentong Kali, was a Malaysian criminal and gangster who gained national attention in the 1990s. He was implicated in 17 different murders and terrorized the capital, Kuala Lumpur, through violence, extortion, and heroin smuggling. He also made headlines when he challenged the police to arrest him. He was finally gunned down by Royal Malaysia Police's Special Actions Unit from Bukit Aman, Kuala Lumpur.

== Personal life ==
Bentong Kali was born to an Indian Tamil family in Bentong, Pahang. He was the eighth child out of his eleven siblings. He went to school until he dropped out in Form 1.

He was said to have a number of tattoos on his body. He had a 'BORN TO DIE' tattoo on his right hand and a picture of a tiger head on his left hand. On both of his thighs, he had pictures of naked women tattooed, followed by snake and eagle character tattoos on his back. Bentong Kali also had a surgical scar on the abdomen.

His favorite choice of weapon was his German-made semi-automatic pistol, a SIG Sauer P226.

== Criminal career ==
Bentong Kali’s criminal career started early in his childhood. He was arrested at the age of 14 and imprisoned until being released at the age of 19. He later joined a Chinese triad called 'Gang 04' in his hometown of Bentong. Bentong Kali was active around the capital in Brickfields, Segambut, Sungei Way, and Ampang. He was arrested again in July 1985 under the Emergency Ordinance proclamation and jailed at Jerejak Island, Penang, but was released soon after in 1987. He was placed under limited residence restrictions in Kuantan, Pahang.

Bentong Kali returned to the criminal world soon after, setting up his own triad called 'Gang 08' in Jalan Klang Lama, Kuala Lumpur, and Taman Sentosa Klang.

=== Drug-trafficking ===
'Gang 04' groups were actively involved in trafficking drugs, and for the offense Bentong Kali was arrested again in April 1980 and charged under the Dangerous Drugs Act 1952. However, he was released when there was not enough evidence to convict him. For the second time, he was placed under house arrest in Gopeng, Perak, for two years. Bentong Kali then disappeared in November 1984.

=== Killing spree ===
In 1991, Bentong Kali resurfaced, committing a string of murders. It was reported that he was killing for the sake of killing, causing police to launch a special operation called 'Ops Buncit' in June 1993. 'Ops Buncit' was joined by 200 police personnel, including those from Kuala Lumpur, Selangor, and Pahang, who were massively mobilized to hunt down Bentong Kali.

He was known for his hot temper. On 12 June 1993, he attended a family function without being invited. A commotion arose between his accomplices and the guests, and Bentong Kali killed some of the guests in the commotion.

== 'Ops Buncit' ==
In an attempt to capture Bentong Kali, posters of him and his crimes were put up in public places all over Malaysia. A bounty of RM100,000 was also advertised as a reward for information that would lead to his capture. His posters were also distributed to neighboring countries such as Thailand. The manhunt for Bentong Kali was a 24/7 operation throughout the nation.

== Death ==
Police intelligence tracked Bentong Kali to his hideout in a double-story terraced house in Medan Damansara, Kuala Lumpur, on 29 June 1993. At the break of dawn, an elite team of police officers from the Special Actions Unit of Bukit Aman took positions and surrounded the house. Bentong Kali and his accomplices engaged the officers in a firefight. He was shot in the head and killed; his accomplices also died at the scene.

His remains were laid to rest on 2 July 1993, three days after his death. His last rites were performed by his son.

== Legacy ==
Bentong Kali's life story was published in a book titled The Story of Bentong Kali: Crime and Society in 90s Kuala Lumpur, written by former New Straits Times journalist Suganthi Supramaniam and published by Gerakbudaya. The book was released on 23 August 2019.
