= Elite Forces of Malaysia =

List of Elite Forces in Malaysia

The Elite Forces of Malaysia (Malay: Pasukan Elit Malaysia) consist of highly trained units sourced from the Malaysian military, law enforcement agencies, and various government departments. Within the Malaysian context, the term "Elite Forces" is used as a broad category that includes special forces, special operations capable units, specialised firefighting units, and other uniquely trained groups within the uniformed services (Pasukan beruniform).

Entry into these units is restricted to regular personnel who successfully complete rigorous selection processes and advanced training programmes designed to meet high operational standards. Specific identifiers distinguish members of these forces from conventional personnel. These identifiers include uniquely coloured berets, shoulder flashes, unit patches, and specialised skill badges, as well as distinct uniform patterns.

== Terminology and classification ==
The formal classification of elite units within the Malaysian Armed Forces (MAF) was officially established in 2024. Prior to this, categorisation largely followed international standards used by the United Kingdom, the United States, NATO, and the United Nations. Contemporary Malaysian doctrine now recognises several distinct terminologies, including "Elite Forces", "Special Forces", "Special Operations Capable", "Commando", and "Special Rescue Units".

=== Elite Forces ===
"Elite Forces" serves as an umbrella term for specialised units across the military, law enforcement, and various government agencies. Similar to the terminology used in the United Kingdom and the United States, it encompasses both special forces and other high-readiness units.

Distinctions between "elite forces" and "special forces" are frequently conflated in Malaysian media and public discourse. This was addressed by Sultan Ibrahim Iskandar of Johor during the 52nd anniversary of Gerak Khas in 2017, where he affirmed that special forces are fundamentally elite units, thereby establishing special forces as a subset within the broader elite forces category.

Malay: ...peranan yang dimainkan oleh Gerak Khas sebagai pasukan elit di barisan hadapan adalah amat penting.

[...the role played by Gerak Khas as an elite frontline force is extremely important.]

— Sultan Ibrahim Iskandar, Berita Tentera Darat Malaysia

As a Commonwealth nation, Malaysia's classification system aligns closely with that of the United Kingdom, particularly in the distinction between Special Forces and Special Operations Forces, rather than adopting the broader "Special Operations Forces" nomenclature used by the United States.

=== Special Forces ===
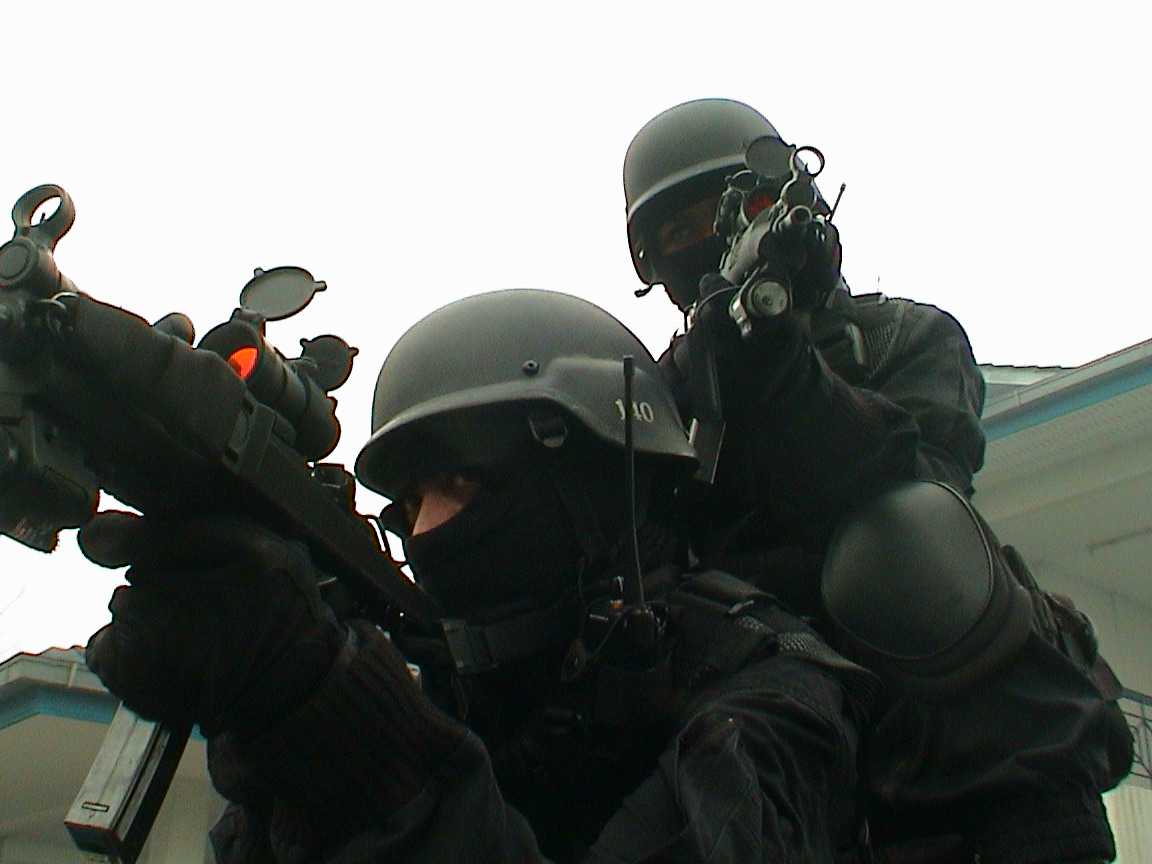
Two operatives from the Special Actions Unit (UTK) of the Pasukan Gerakan Khas, equipped with MP5-N submachine guns, participating in an urban warfare exercise.

According to the 2024 Manual Kualiti Standard Angkatan Tentera Malaysia (SATM; lit. 'Malaysian Armed Forces Standard Quality Manual'), the MAF officially designates specific formations as Special Forces (Malay: Pasukan Khas). Personnel within these units are placed in a distinct category due to their unique mission profiles, specific operational responsibilities, and the requirement for rigorous selection and specialised training.

Malay: ...untuk semua anggota pasukan khas seperti GGK, PASKAU, PASKAL, PAC, anggota penerbangan, penyelam, anak-anak kapal selam dan pembantu perubatan selam.

[...for all special forces personnel such as the 21 Special Service Group (21 SSG), the RMAF Special Forces (PASKAU), the Naval Special Forces (PASKAL), the Malaysian Rapid Deployment Force (PAC), aircrew, divers, submarine crew, and dive medical assistants.]

— SATM 11, Manual Kualiti Standard Angkatan Tentera Malaysia (SATM)

Under the SATM standards, the following units are officially designated as "Special Forces":

- Gerak Khas and the 21st Special Service Group (21 SSG)
- RMAF Special Forces (PASKAU)
- Naval Special Forces (PASKAL)
- MAF Rapid Deployment Force (RDF/PAC) and the 10th Parachute Brigade
- MAF Aircrew
- RMN Divers
- RMN Submariners
- MAF Dive Medical Assistants

Applying similar criteria, the Special Tasks and Rescue (STAR) unit of the Malaysian Coast Guard is also classified as a special force. Within the Royal Malaysia Police, the designation is restricted to units under the Pasukan Gerakan Khas (Special Operations Command). Historically, the primary criterion for "Special Forces" status was the requirement for personnel to undergo a formal special forces selection process.

=== Special Operations Capable ===
In the Malaysian context, "Special Operations Capable" (or Special Operations Force) is distinct from "Special Forces". These units are trained in special operations but do not fall under a dedicated special forces headquarters. Instead, they are typically elite elements attached to lower-level commands, such as infantry battalions, and execute missions under their parent force's leadership. Examples include the reconnaissance and sniper elements of regular infantry battalions.

=== Commando ===
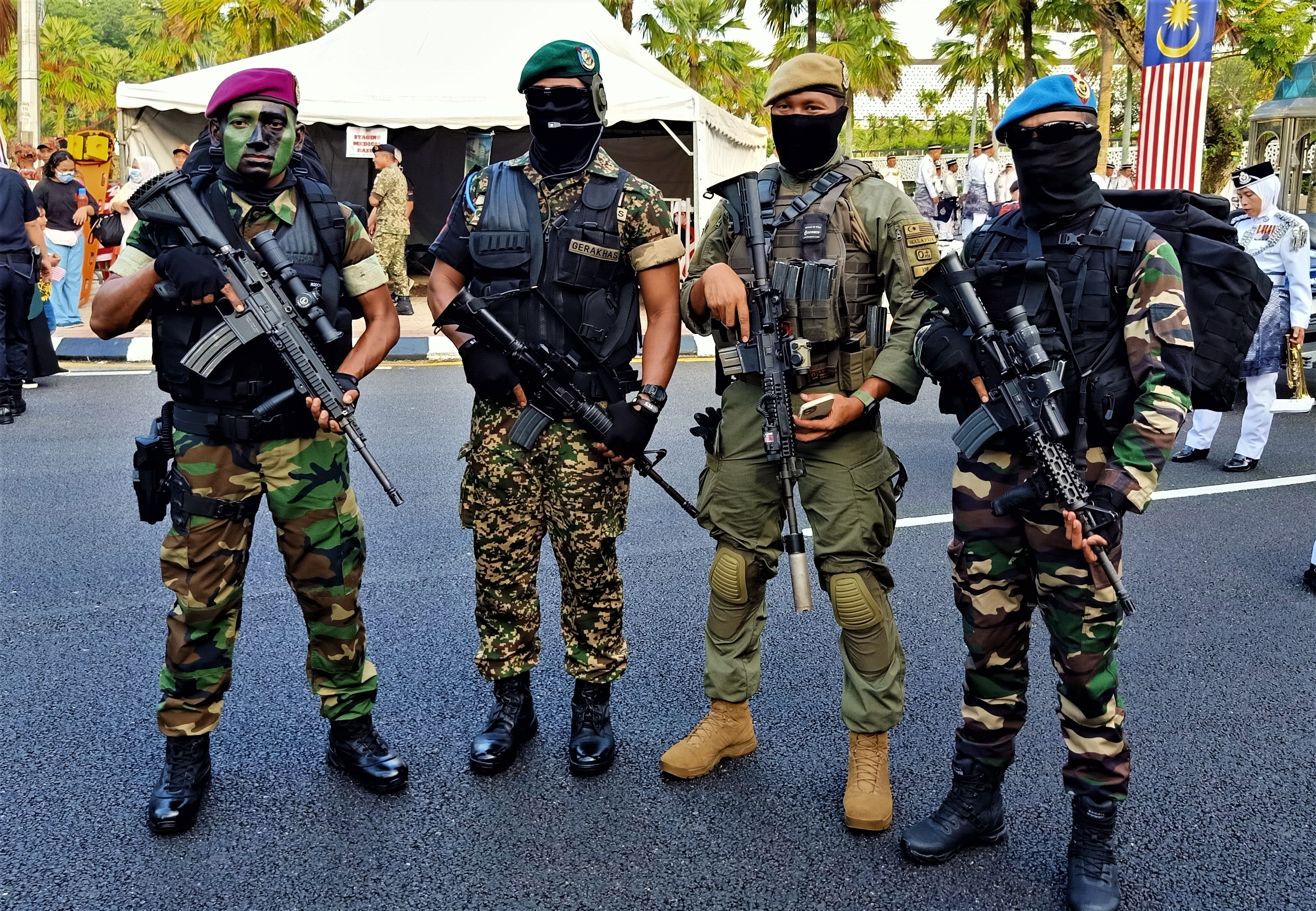
Commandos from four different units during the 65th Merdeka Day: from left, a commando from PASKAL, a commando from 21 SSG, a commando from VAT 69, and a commando from PASKAU.

The term "commando" was introduced to Malaysia during the Second World War via Force 136, the Far East branch of the Special Operations Executive. These units were inserted into Malaya to conduct sabotage and recruit local resistance fighters. Consequently, the term in Malaysia signifies expertise in guerrilla warfare, small-unit tactics, and jungle warfare, differing slightly from the amphibious raiding role traditionally associated with the Royal Marines Commando.

Historically, the "commando" designation was applied more broadly; for instance, the Sarawak Rangers were recognised as commandos during the Malayan Emergency. In 1972, the Tiger Platoon (Note: The Tiger Platoon was a specialised long-range reconnaissance patrol unit formerly attached to regular infantry battalions within the Malaysian Army. Tasked with deep-penetration scouting and intelligence gathering, the personnel underwent rigorous instruction at the Special Warfare Training Centre (PULPAK). The unit was eventually dissolved and its roles were absorbed by the Combat Intelligence Section (CIS), which subsequently evolved into the dedicated reconnaissance and sniper elements integrated into modern Malaysian infantry structures.) of 9th R MALAY (9 RAMD) also earned this status for their role in the Communist insurgency. Today, the designation is strictly reserved for units whose members have graduated from a basic commando course at an official Malaysian commando school.

=== Special Rescue Unit ===
Special Rescue Units are specialised non-combat teams, such as special operations firefighters, tasked with unconventional search and rescue (SAR) missions. These units employ selection processes and training standards modelled after military special operations. They utilise specialised equipment and methods typically associated with special forces to execute complex SAR operations.

== History ==
=== Early Malay Kingdoms and Sultanates ===
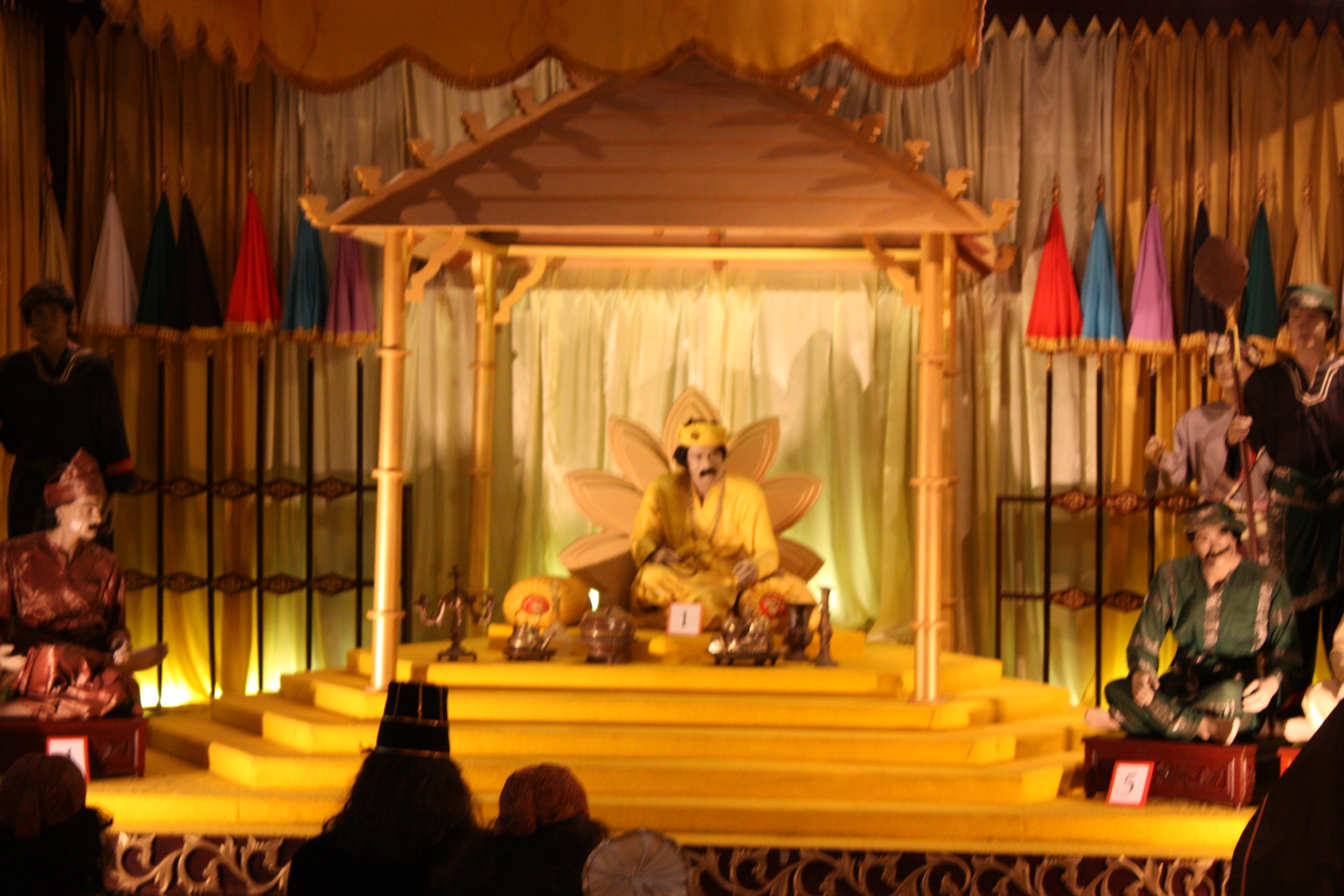
Two mannequins dressed as Ceterias in traditional black Pendekar attire stand guard beside the Sultan of Malacca in the royal court display at the Malacca Cultural Museum.

The antecedents of elite military forces in Malaysia trace back to the warrior institutions of early Malay kingdoms, notably the Kingdom of Singapura (c. 1299–1398) and the Malacca Sultanate (c. 1400–1511). These polities developed structured hierarchies of military retainers, commanders, and court guards who managed warfare, royal security, and territorial administration.

==== Hulubalang and Ceteria ====
During the Malacca Sultanate, elite military personnel were broadly categorised into two main groups, namely the Hulubalang (Jawi: هولوبالڠ) and the Ceteria (Jawi: چيتيريا).

- Hulubalang: Military commanders and warriors of noble or high social standing responsible for leading troops and enforcing royal authority. Senior state officials, including the Bendahara (chief minister) and Laksamana (admiral), exercised military command within their respective spheres, while lower-ranking Hulubalang served beneath them. Following the fall of Malacca in 1511, the title persisted across other Malay polities with varying institutional roles. In the Aceh Sultanate, the cognate title Uleëbalang evolved to denote hereditary territorial lords who held administrative and judicial authority over local fiefs.
- Ceteria: A class of court warriors of noble or high social standing tasked specifically with protecting the Sultan and the royal court. As noted by historian Badli Shah Alauddin (2024), the Ceteria outranked the Hulubalang in court ceremonial hierarchy and performed vital roles during state rituals and royal proceedings.

==== Orang Laut maritime forces ====
Historians Barbara Watson Andaya and Leonard Y. Andaya (1982) identify the Orang Laut (sea peoples) as the core naval force of the Malacca Sultanate. Having originally accompanied Parameswara during his migrations from Palembang to Temasek and ultimately Malacca, the Orang Laut served as key military allies to the throne.

Equipped with fast, highly manoeuvrable vessels and intimate knowledge of local waterways, they were deployed for maritime reconnaissance, sea-lane protection, anti-piracy patrols, and naval fleet engagements. The office of Laksamana was directly tied to the leadership of these Orang Laut fleets, which formed the primary component of Malacca's maritime defence.

==== Bugis naval forces ====
In the subsequent Johor-Riau polity, historian Sabri Zain characterises Bugis warriors as an elite maritime fighting force. Citing 17th and 18th-century historical records, including Raja Ali Haji's Tuhfat al-Nafis and Godinho de Eredia's Declaraçam de Malaca, Zain highlights that Bugis forces were distinguished by superior arms and protective gear, such as baju rantai (chainmail armour).

Bugis naval tactics relied on rapid boat strikes followed by swift retreats into shallow rivers, mangrove swamps, and coastal islands where heavy European or rival vessels could not follow. Owing to their military success, several Bugis military commanders were eventually integrated into the higher political hierarchy of the Johor-Riau Sultanate.

=== World War II ===
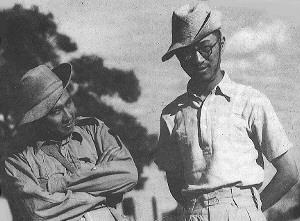
Two Force 136 operatives, Tan Chong Tee and Lim Bo Seng, during their training in India with the Special Operations Executive. Both, along with other Force 136 operatives, were later dispatched via submarine to Malaya to set up an espionage network in Malaya.

Malaysia's first exposure to modern special operations occurred during the Second World War. Force 136, a multinational guerrilla unit under the British Special Operations Executive (SOE), operated behind enemy lines against Japanese Imperial Forces. Local recruits, including Chin Phui Kong, Ibrahim Ismail, and Tunku Osman, underwent commando training at SOE-endorsed camps. Operatives were inserted into British Malaya via parachute or submarine to establish local resistance groups, collectively known as Force 136 (Malaya). Many former members continued to serve in the MAF after the war, influencing the development of future elite units.

=== Malayan Emergency ===
The post-war power vacuum led to the Malayan Emergency, a conflict between the Malayan National Liberation Army (the armed wing of the Communist Party of Malaya) and British colonial forces. Realising that conventional tactics were ineffective in jungle warfare, the British Military Administration (BMA) established several unconventional units.

==== Ferret Force ====
On 6 July 1948, Colonel John Davis, a former commander of Force 136, was tasked with establishing a specialised jungle-guerrilla unit for anti-insurgent operations known as the Ferret Force. The pioneer elements consisted of two patrols from the Malay Regiment, two patrols from the Gurkha Rifles, and a headquarters group. Despite its operational success, the Ferret Force was short-lived and remained active for only six months. It was disbanded due to prevailing political sensitivities and a temporary shift in government policy towards negotiation rather than military action.

==== Malayan Scouts ====
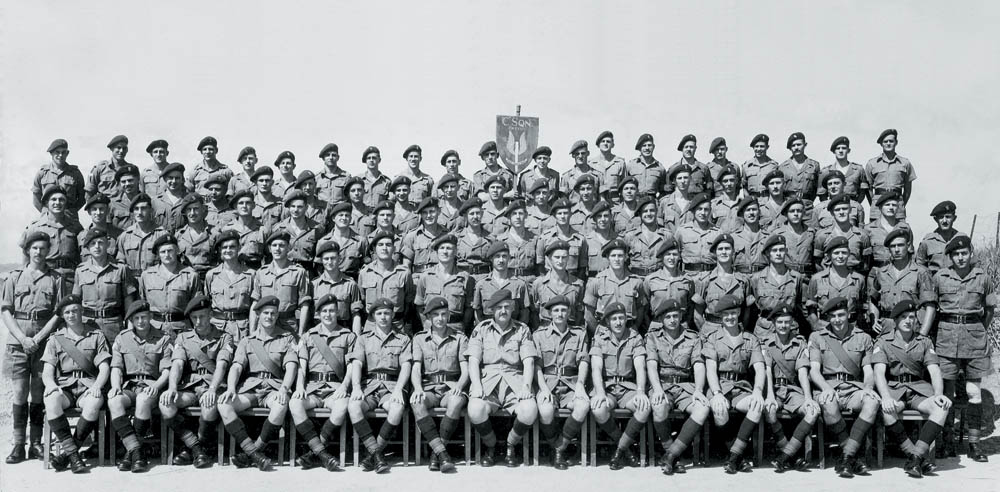
C (Rhodesian) Squadron of the Malayan Scouts during the Malayan Emergency in 1953. SAS troopers used maroon berets during this period.

By 1950, Major Michael "Mad Mike" Calvert, a veteran of the Chindits, formed the Malayan Scouts to operate deep within the jungle. The Ferret Force was eventually absorbed as A Squadron of the Malayan Scouts. Other squadrons included Z Squadron (21 SAS), Rhodesian SAS (C Squadron), and Australian SAS (D Squadron). In 1951, the Malayan Scouts were officially integrated into the British Army as the 22nd Special Air Service Regiment (22 SAS). Due to their role in training early Malaysian special units, the Malayan Scouts are widely regarded as the historical predecessors of the modern special forces in Malaysia.

==== Special Branch ====
The Special Branch (SB) was formed as the intelligence successor to the Malayan Security Service. Restructured on the recommendation of Mike Calvert, the SB provided critical intelligence by infiltrating the Communist Party of Malaya. It remains a department within the Royal Malaysia Police today.

==== Sarawak Rangers and Senoi Praaq ====
The Sarawak Rangers saw three iterations, but only the third (1948–1963) is classified as an elite unit. Recruited primarily from the Iban people for their tracking skills, they were trained by the Malayan Scouts and the Royal Marines. This unit was the predecessor to the modern Royal Ranger Regiment.

The Senoi Praaq (Semai for 'War People') was formed in 1956 by General Gerald Templer. Composed of indigenous Orang Asli, the unit was trained by the Malayan Scouts in military tactics and served as a squadron in the Malayan Scouts. Their effectiveness in jungle warfare later led to their commander, Lieutenant Colonel R.O.D. Noone, assisting the CIA in establishing the Montagnard Scouts during the Vietnam War. Today, the Senoi Praaq serves as a paramilitary long-ranged reconnaissance element within the General Operations Force.

=== Post-Independence and the Indonesia–Malaysia confrontation ===
Following independence in 1957 and the formation of Malaysia in 1963, the nation faced the Konfrontasi with Indonesia. This period underscored the necessity for permanent, homegrown elite forces.

==== Malayan Special Forces ====
Established in 1960, the Malayan Special Forces (MSF) was a rapid deployment task force created in response to a UN request for peacekeeping in the Congo (ONUC). Comprising elements from the Royal Malay Regiment and the Federation Reconnaissance Regiment (present-day Royal Armoured Corps), the MSF operated in the Congo until 1963, when they were recalled due to the escalating conflict with Indonesia.

==== Malaysian Special Service Unit ====
The Malaysian Special Service Unit (MSSU) was established in 1965 as a joint special forces task force. Proposed by Abdul Razak and General Tunku Osman, both of whom had ties to Force 136, the unit was developed with the assistance of the 40 Commando Royal Marines. The MSSU recruited from all branches of the military, though the army held administrative control. In 1970, the MSSU was reorganised to make way for a permanent special forces structure, eventually evolving into the modern Gerak Khas.

== Tier levels of Elite Forces in Malaysia ==
Malaysia employs an informal tiered classification for its elite forces, a system comparable to structures used in the United States and the United Kingdom. This hierarchy reflects a unit's proximity to high-level command and the priority assigned to its deployment for strategic or specialised missions. Currently, these units are categorised into three primary levels:

=== Federal-level (Strategic) ===
This represents the highest tier within the Malaysian security framework. It typically involves inter-agency or joint task forces composed of veteran personnel drawn from multiple uniformed services. These formations are assembled for high-priority or non-conventional missions and operate under the direct oversight of the nation's top government and security leadership. Personnel are not permanently assigned to these task forces; instead, they serve on a rotational basis and return to their original parent services upon the conclusion of an operation or assignment.

=== Services-level (Operational) ===
This is the standard tier for elite units established within their respective uniformed services. These formations are commanded and administered by their specific branches of the military, law enforcement, or other government departments. Larger organisations, such as the Malaysian Army or the Royal Malaysia Police, often consolidate their elite units under a dedicated Special Forces Command. Within this level, further sub-tiers may exist based on the unit's technical specialisation, the intensity of its training, and its specific operational scope.

=== Mid-level command (Tactical) ===
This tier consists of elite-trained personnel who operate at the battalion level or below. These assets are typically integrated into larger formations to provide specialised capabilities for their parent units. Their roles primarily include high-stakes tasks such as long-range reconnaissance and sniper operations.

== Federal Elite Task Forces ==
A "Federal Elite Task Force" in Malaysia refers to a specialised joint formation of personnel drawn from various uniformed services, operating under the direct authority of the federal government. These units represent the highest level of the country's elite forces hierarchy and are typically overseen by the National Security Council.

Selection for these task forces involves rigorous courses established by the Malaysian government. In recognition of their elite status and the high-risk nature of their responsibilities, members receive additional occupational allowances.

Historically, two federal-level task forces have existed. Following the disbandment of the National Special Operations Force (NSOF) in October 2018, one federal-level task force remain active:

=== Special Malaysia Disaster Assistance and Rescue Team ===
Internationally recognised as SMART, this unit is a certified joint Heavy Urban Search and Rescue (USAR) task force under the International Search and Rescue Advisory Group (INSARAG). Its official Malay name is Pasukan Mencari dan Menyelamat Khas Malaysia. Based in Puchong, Selangor, it is a highly specialised disaster relief unit.

Established in May 1994, SMART reports directly to Malaysia's executive leadership and operates under the National Disaster Management Agency (NADMA). The team can be deployed for both domestic and international missions at the directive of the prime minister. Officers and technicians are seconded from the Malaysian Armed Forces (MAF), the Royal Malaysia Police, and the Fire and Rescue Department of Malaysia. Its capabilities and joint structure have drawn comparisons to the Hyper Rescue Team of the Tokyo Fire Department.

== Malaysian Armed Forces ==
The Malaysian Armed Forces (abbr.: MAF; Malay: Angkatan Tentera Malaysia) is a tri-service military organisation consisting of the Malaysian Army, the Royal Malaysian Navy, and the Royal Malaysian Air Force. In contrast to the United States model, the Malaysian Coast Guard is a militarised agency that does not form part of the MAF. (Note: The U.S. Coast Guard, though part of the United States Armed Forces, operates under a different federal department than the other military branches.)

Each branch of the MAF maintains its own elite units, which are independently selected, trained, and managed. While these units are branch-specific, they may be integrated into a joint force for specific operations. Cell D of the Joint Forces Command oversees coordination during such engagements.

In 2019, proposals were introduced to establish a unified command for special forces within the MAF, analogous to the United States Joint Special Operations Command (JSOC). Currently, the Defence Special Operations Division (DSOD) serves as the primary joint special operations unit, recruiting personnel from across the various services of the MAF.

=== Defence Special Operations Division ===
The Defence Special Operations Division (abbr.: DSOD; Malay: Bahagian Operasi Pasukan Khas Pertahanan, BOPKP) is a joint counter-terrorism task force. It was established as the successor to the National Special Operations Force (NSOF), although its recruitment is restricted to special forces personnel from within the Ministry of Defence. (Note: The National Special Operations Force (NSOF) recruits its members from the elite ranks of special forces across various branches of Malaysia's defence and security organisations, including the Malaysian Army, the Royal Malaysian Navy, the Royal Malaysian Air Force, the Royal Malaysia Police, and the Malaysia Coast Guard.) The DSOD is currently under the operational command of the Joint Force Headquarters.

The formation of the DSOD was announced in January 2019 by the then Chief of Defence Forces, General Zulkifli Zainal Abidin, and it became officially operational on 10 May 2019. Based at Camp Perdana in Kuala Lumpur, the DSOD occupies the former headquarters of the NSOF. In terms of mission scope and organisational structure, the DSOD is often compared to Canada's Joint Task Force 2 (JTF 2).

=== MAF War Dog Unit ===
The MAF War Dog Unit (Malay: Pasukan Anjing Perang ATM) is an elite specialised detachment within the Wolf Branch (Cawangan Serigala) of the Army Combat Training Centre. The unit is responsible for providing canine attack support to various elite formations within the MAF. Both the handlers and their canines undergo advanced training to prepare them for the high-intensity requirements of special operations.

While the majority of the unit's assets are currently attached to the DSOD, specific teams are also assigned to the Special Warfare Training Centre to support regiments within the Gerak Khas ('Army Special Forces'). In its operational scope, the unit performs a role similar to the United States Navy's Combat Assault Dogs (CAD) program, which provides specialised canine support to Navy SEALs.

== Malaysian Army ==
The Malaysian Army is the land component of the MAF and the largest military branch in the country. It comprises multiple corps and regiments, including its own aviation capabilities. According to the Manual Kualiti Standard Angkatan Tentera Malaysia (SATM), the army maintains several elite formations.

=== Gerak Khas ===
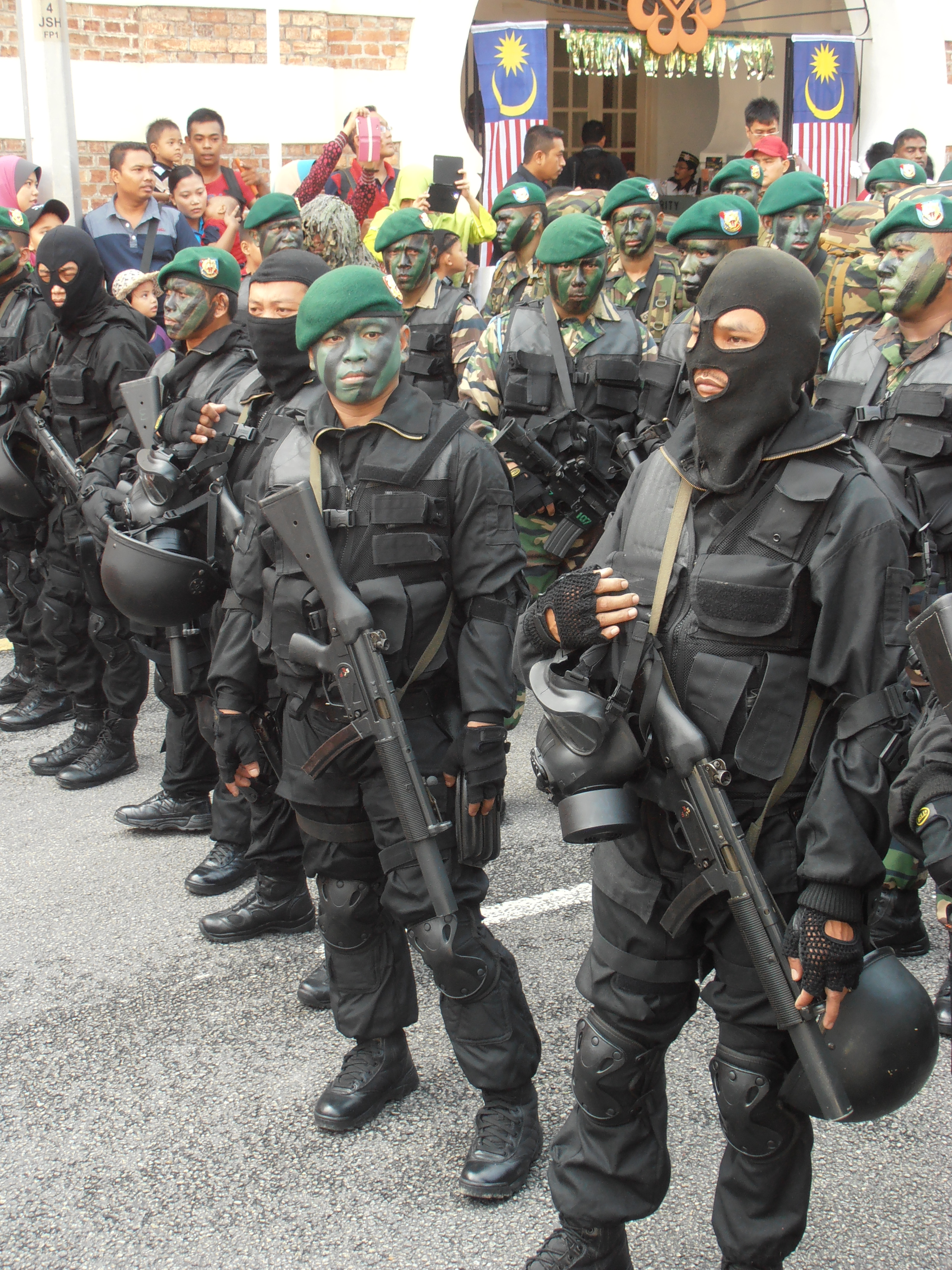
The elite commandos of the Malaysian Army's Gerak Khas, distinguished by their iconic green berets, were on standby to march during the 56th Merdeka Day Parade at Merdeka Square, Kuala Lumpur.

Gerak Khas (lit. 'Special Forces' or 'Army Special Forces') is the primary special forces unit of the Malaysian Army. Originally established in 1965 as the Malaysian Special Service Unit (MSSU), it was formed as a joint task force during the Indonesia–Malaysia Confrontation. Although the MSSU initially recruited from all branches of the MAF, the majority of its personnel were drawn from the Army.

The unit was raised with the assistance of the 40 Commando, Royal Marines. Consequently, Gerak Khas inherited several traditions from the British commandos, including the green beret, Caribbean blue (light blue) lanyard, and the Fairbairn-Sykes commando knife. In 1970, the MSSU was reorganised as the 1st Special Service Regiment and placed under a special forces command. While it was previously managed within a specific corps, since 2017, Gerak Khas has functioned as a specialised functional group. Entry is restricted to personnel who complete the Malaysian Special Forces selection process.

Current components of Gerak Khas include:

- 21st Special Services Group – The administrative and operational command
- 91st Intelligence Operations Group – Special Forces personnel attached to military intelligence
- 11th, 21st, and 22nd Regiments – Operational special forces units
- Special Warfare Training Centre – The commando and special operations school.

The Gerak Khas is regarded as the Malaysian equivalent to the British Special Air Service (SAS), the United States Army Special Forces (Green Berets), and the Russian Spetsnaz.

=== 21st Special Service Group ===
The 21st Special Service Group (abbr.: 21 SSG; Malay: 21 Gerup Gerak Khas) acts as the special forces command for the Malaysian Army. Led by a two-star general, it functions as a combat formation that includes support elements such as signals, logistics, and medical units. It is headquartered at Camp Sri Iskandar in Mersing, Johor, and is comparable in role to the U.S. Army Special Operations Command.

=== 10th Parachute Brigade ===
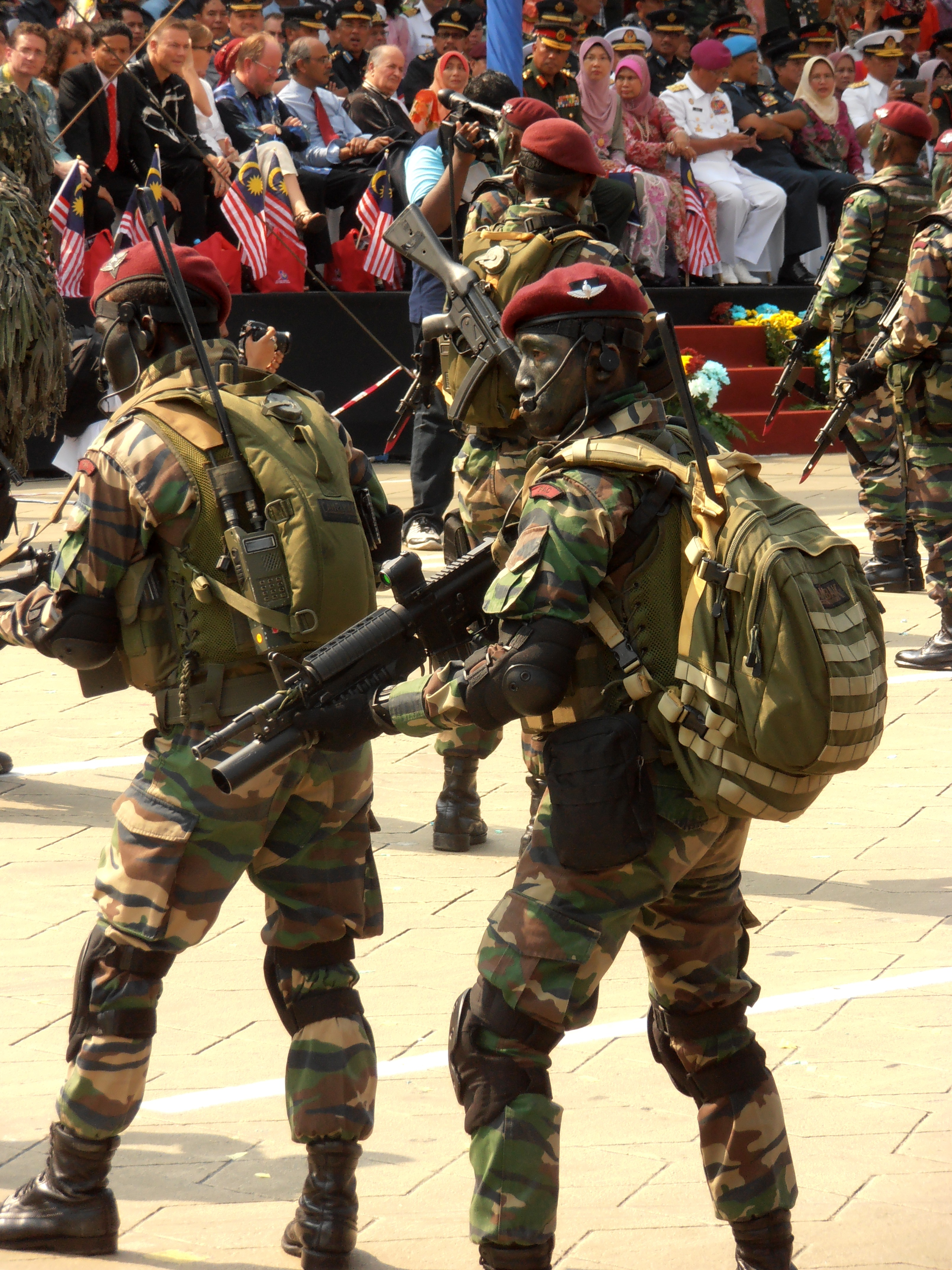
Paratroopers from the 10th Parachute Brigade preparing for a demonstration during the 56th Merdeka Day Parade.

The 10th Parachute Brigade (abbr.: 10 PARA BDE) is an elite combat formation and the core of the Malaysian Rapid Deployment Force (RDF). It is a shock troop unit consisting of specialised light infantry, light armour, artillery, signals, engineering, logistics and medical units. The brigade was officially established in 1979, originally inspired by the British Army's Parachute Regiment.

In 2022, the brigade completed its transition into a specialised light infantry with hybrid airborne-marine capabilities, with all infantry units trained in airborne, air assault and amphibious operations. Membership requires completing a rigorous pipeline, including the Induction Programme, the Basic Parachutist Course, and the Basic RDF Course. In 2020, the unit was reclassified as specialised light infantry, aligning its status with units such as the 75th Ranger Regiment and the British Ranger Regiment.

==== Pathfinders Company ====
Established in 1995 as the Platun Pandura (lit. 'Pathfinders Platoon'), this unit provides special reconnaissance, pathfinding, forward observer, and sniper support for the RDF and the 10 PARA BDE. It was upgraded to a company-sized unit in 2008. The company recruits exclusively from within the brigade and is responsible for various tasks, including preparing drop zones and helicopter landing sites days before a main force insertion. Its roles are similar to those of the British Army's Pathfinder Platoon, the USMC Force Recon, the USMC Scout Sniper, and the French Army's Commando Parachute Group.

=== 91st Intelligence Operations Group ===
Formed in 1972, the 91st Intelligence Operations Group (91 GOP) is the combat intelligence special forces unit of the Royal Intelligence Corps. Its personnel must pass the standard special forces selection. Historically, the unit supported clandestine operations and provided human intelligence (HUMINT) during the communist insurgency. Today, its operations remain largely classified, and it provides specialised manpower to the Malaysian Defence Intelligence Organisation. Its roles are comparable to the Intelligence Support Activity.

=== 165th Military Intelligence Battalion ===
The 165th Military Intelligence Battalion (165 MIB) was formed in 2008 to provide tactical intelligence, surveillance, and reconnaissance. It utilises advanced intelligence-gathering technology, including unmanned aerial vehicles (UAVs), sensors, and long-range cameras, to support elite formations like 21 SSG and 10 PARA BDE. It is considered the Malaysian Army equivalent of the United States Air Force Special Reconnaissance.

=== Other Elite Forces designations ===
Under the SATM standards, Army aircrews within the Malaysian Army Aviation and Dive Medical Assistants of the Royal Medical Corps are also categorised as "Special Forces". Additionally, reconnaissance and sniper elements at the standard infantry battalion level are classified as "Special Operations Capable" units.

== Royal Malaysian Navy ==
The Royal Malaysian Navy (abbr.: RMN; Malay: Tentera Laut Diraja Malaysia — TLDM) is the naval component of the Malaysian Armed Forces. It serves as the nation's primary maritime defence force, operating under a separate jurisdiction from the Malaysian Coast Guard and the Royal Malaysian Police Marine Operations Force. Although classified as a green-water navy, the RMN maintains the capacity for blue-water operations through international collaboration, such as joint exercises in Hawaii and anti-piracy missions in the Indian Ocean.

The Manual Kualiti Standard Angkatan Tentera Malaysia (SATM) officially categorises several units within the RMN as elite or special forces.

=== Naval Special Forces ===
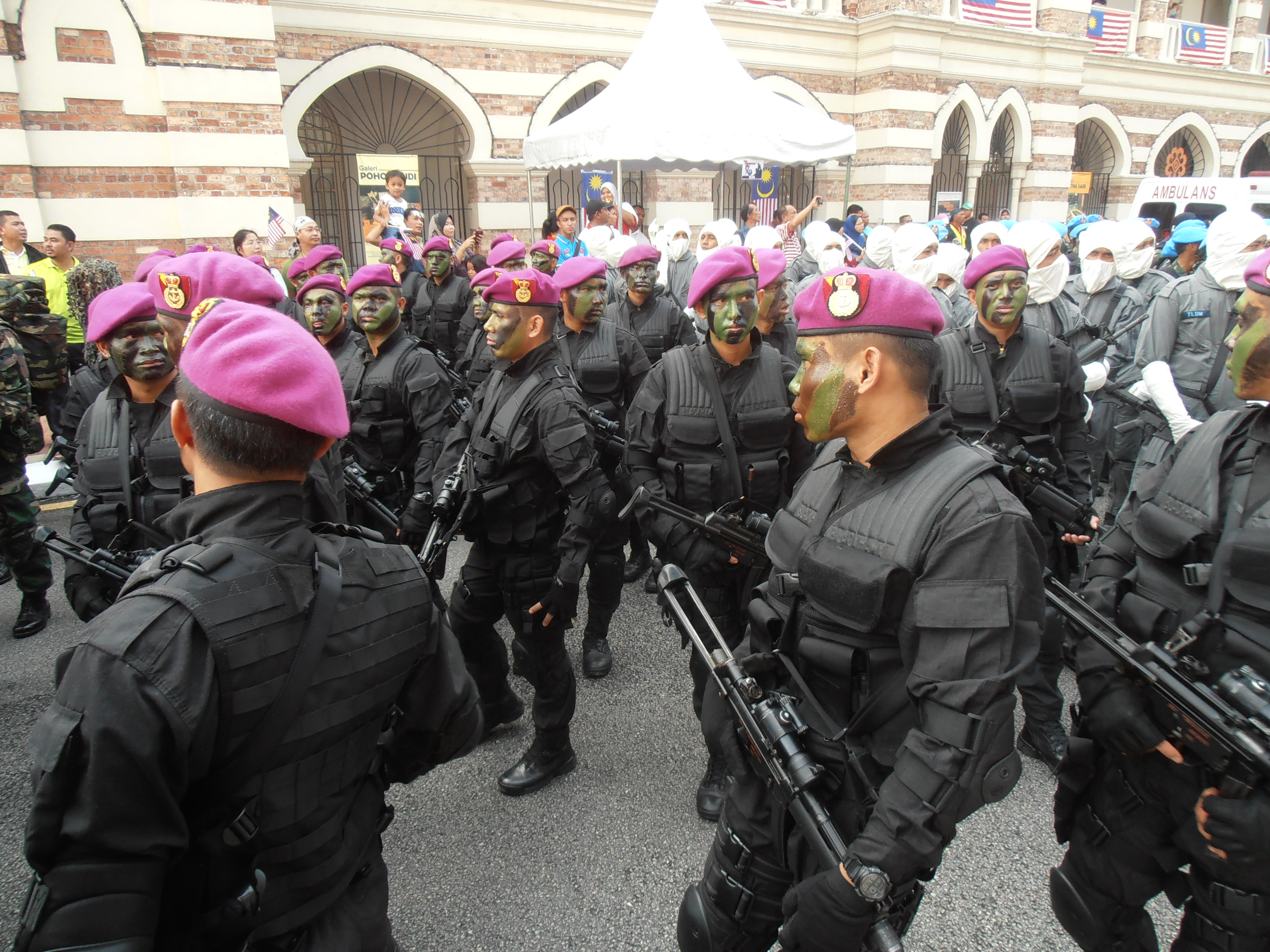
Naval Special Forces commandos, identifiable by their magenta berets, prepare to march ahead of the 65th Merdeka Day parade.

The Naval Special Forces (Malay: Pasukan Khas Laut — PASKAL) is the special force of the RMN and operate under the Naval Special Forces Command. Established in 1977 as the Naval Commando Unit, the formation initially focused on the protection of naval assets and bases, a role similar to that of the 43 Commando Fleet Protection Group Royal Marines. In 1982, following the United Nations Convention on the Law of the Sea (UNCLOS), PASKAL's mandate was expanded to include the protection of Malaysia's Exclusive Economic Zone (EEZ).

PASKAL shares an indirect lineage with the Malaysian Special Service Unit (MSSU), as several former MSSU members assisted in the formation of the original naval commando element. The unit's training and identity were shaped by various international special forces programmes:

- Indonesian Marine Corps Jungle Commando Course: Influenced the adoption of the magenta beret.
- Indonesian Navy KOPASKA Commando Course
- Royal Marines Commando Course: Resulted in the adoption of the Fairbairn-Sykes commando knife and the dark-blue lanyard.
- Basic Underwater Demolition/SEAL (BUD/S) Training: Influenced the design of the Trimedia, the Malaysian version of the Navy SEAL Trident.

Today, successful graduates of the RMN Special Forces Selection are awarded the magenta beret, the Trimedia insignia, a navy blue lanyard, and a Fairbairn-Sykes commando knife. Personnel must complete the formal Malaysian special forces selection to join. PASKAL is considered the RMN equivalent of the British Special Boat Service (SBS) and the United States Navy's SEAL Team Six.

=== Royal Malaysian Navy Divers ===
RMN Divers (Malay: Penyelam TLDM) is the collective term for combat dive-trained personnel, typically assigned to the Naval Diving and Mine Warfare Command (NDMW). Established in 2013, the command specialises in clearance diving, salvage operations, and explosive ordnance disposal (EOD). This formation succeeded the Naval Diving Unit, which was founded in 1965 at the Woodlands Naval Base. The unit eventually merged with the Navy Diving School in 1998 to form KD Duyong before the NDMW was established as a separate operational command.

While the RMN Divers is classified as a special force under SATM standards, its personnel follow a dedicated diving and EOD pipeline rather than the standard Malaysian special forces selection. Based at the Lumut Naval Base, the NDMW consists of four operational teams. Members are distinguished by naval diver and EOD skill badges on their uniforms. The NDMW is comparable to the United States Navy's Underwater Construction Teams (UCT), Royal Navy's Mine & Threat Exploitation Group (MTXG) and the Royal Australian Navy's Clearance Diving Branch.

NDMW Teams and Roles
Name	Responsibility	Task
Clearance Diving Team 1	Underwater rescue, construction, and salvage support	Team 1 is mandated to conduct underwater rescue, construction, and salvage operations at depths exceeding the standard operational limits of other naval diving units. Its primary remit involves the development of underwater infrastructure for the MAF, alongside the safety and recovery of RMN assets, including surface combatants, auxiliary support vessels, and submarines. The team is further tasked with responding to maritime incidents in open waters and removing subsurface obstructions to maintain the integrity of national navigation routes. While the unit's core priority is the protection of military assets, Team 1 maintains the capability to assist in the salvage of civilian or non-RMN vessels during national emergencies. To ensure immediate operational readiness, divers are permanently embarked on specialised RMN platforms. These include the submarine rescue ship MV Mega Bakti and several Mahamiru-class mine countermeasures vessels, such as KD Jerai, KD Ledang, and KD Kinabalu.
Clearance Diving Team 2	Shallow-water mine countermeasures	Team 2 is tasked with the clearance of naval mines and explosive hazards along coastal regions. Its primary role is to facilitate amphibious landing operations by neutralising subsurface threats, thereby ensuring the safety of designated landing zones. As such, the unit serves as a critical component of the MAF's amphibious warfare capability. During large-scale operations, Team 2 divers are frequently embedded with reconnaissance elements from PASKAL and the Pathfinder Company to secure beachheads ahead of the main landing force. These personnel provide essential mine countermeasures and obstacle clearance to permit the safe passage of assault craft. To enhance operational flexibility, select members of the unit are parachute-qualified, allowing for rapid insertion into mission zones via fixed-wing or rotary-wing aircraft.
Clearance Diving Team 3	Bomb disposal support	Team 3 is a specialised unit dedicated to Explosive Ordnance Disposal (EOD) and Improvised Explosive Device Disposal (IEDD). Unlike other teams, Team 3 is designed for tactical integration with ground assault elements, including both special operations forces and conventional combat units. Its personnel undergo advanced training in unconventional warfare and maritime counter-terrorism (MCT) tactics. They are proficient in diverse insertion techniques across sea, air, and land domains, allowing bomb technicians to operate alongside assault teams in high-threat environments. The primary mandate of Team 3 is to provide technical EOD and IEDD support for a wide range of missions, extending their services beyond the RMN to other branches of the MAF. Their responsibilities involve the identification, rendering safe, and neutralisation of explosive devices to protect military assets and ensure public safety.
Clearance Diving Team 4	Underwater engineering support	Team 4, also known as Fleet Support Divers, provides comprehensive underwater engineering services for the naval fleets and installations of the RMN. The unit is responsible for the maintenance and security of ports, jetties, and harbours under naval jurisdiction, in addition to providing technical support for RMN vessels. Personnel are strategically stationed across all major naval facilities to ensure continuous operational coverage. Functioning as first responders, Team 4 is tasked with addressing emergencies and logistical requirements within their assigned sectors. Their proximity to key infrastructure allows for the rapid deployment of underwater expertise, encompassing tasks such as hull inspections, underwater maintenance, and the clearance of maritime obstructions.

=== Other Elite Forces designations ===
Under the SATM standards, several other RMN categories are designated as "Special Forces". These include naval aircrews within the Royal Malaysian Navy Aviation, RMN Dive Medical Assistants attached to the Royal Medical Corps, and submarine-trained personnel serving within the RMN Submarine Command.

== Royal Malaysian Air Force ==
The Royal Malaysian Air Force (abbr.: RMAF; Malay: Tentera Udara Diraja Malaysia — TUDM) is the aerial warfare branch of the Malaysian Armed Forces, responsible for the air and space defence of Malaysia. While it is the primary air service, other military branches maintain independent aviation units. The RMAF also maintains ground combat formations, which house the majority of its elite components.

According to the Manual Kualiti Standard Angkatan Tentera Malaysia (SATM), several units within the RMAF are officially categorised as elite or special forces.

=== RMAF Special Forces ===
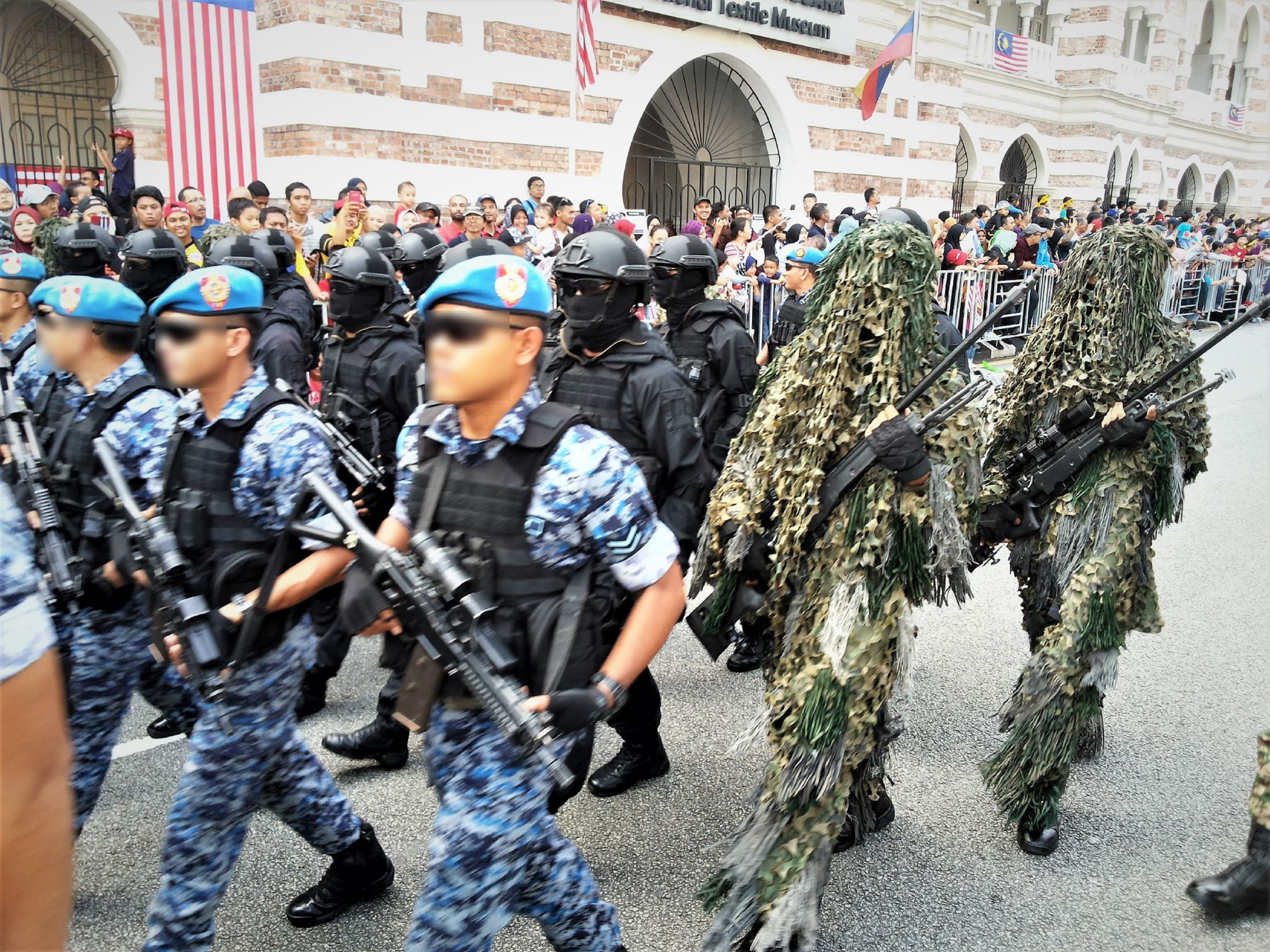
RMAF Special Forces commandos dressed in the No.4 Digital Camouflage combat uniform, tactical gear and ghillie suits parading during the 60th Merdeka Day Parade at Sultan Abdul Samad Street in Kuala Lumpur.

The RMAF Special Forces (Malay: Pasukan Khas TUDM — PASKAU) serves as the service's special forces. The unit traces an indirect lineage to the Malaysian Special Service Unit (MSSU) through a 1983 initiative. During this period, a detachment of Gerak Khas commandos was assigned to the RMAF Ground and Air Defence Force (HANDAU) to establish two specialised sections:

- Combat Air Rescue Team: Modelled after the United States Air Force (USAF) Pararescue (PJ), this team specialises in personnel recovery and combat search and rescue (CSAR).
- Rapid Deployment Force: Designed for swift mobilisation via helicopter to provide support to units under attack.

In 1996, these elements were consolidated into a single formation known as the Pasukan Khas Udara (abbr.: PKU; lit. 'Special Air Service'). In 2002, the unit was renamed Pasukan Khas TUDM. Entry into PASKAU is restricted to RMAF officers and airmen who successfully complete the Malaysian special forces selection.

PASKAU is organised into specialised squadrons focusing on roles such as CSAR, forward air control, and counter-terrorism. Its structure and mission sets are comparable to the USAF Special Tactics Squadrons, incorporating roles similar to PJ, Combat Control Teams (CCT), and Joint Terminal Attack Controllers (JTAC). Members are identified by a light blue beret with a red-backed cap badge and a light blue lanyard.

=== RMAF GDF Rapid Intervention Team ===
The RMAF Ground Defence Force (abbr.: GDF; Malay: Pasukan Pertahanan Darat TUDM — HANDAU) is a light infantry and security unit within the air force. Personnel are stationed at major RMAF bases and receive training in urban warfare, air-mobility, and base security. They also provide operational support to PASKAU during the capture and securing of airfields.

Each GDF squadron maintains a small special operations capable section known as the Rapid Intervention Team (abbr.: RIT; Malay: Tim Atur Cepat — TAC). The RIT functions as a tactical response unit for air bases, specialising in close-quarters combat (CQC). These units also serve as "fly-away" security teams, accompanying transport aircraft to secure personnel and assets in deployed environments. The RIT is considered the Malaysian equivalent of the USAF Deployed Aircraft Ground Response Element (DAGRE).

=== Other Elite Forces designations ===
Under SATM standards, all aircrews within the RMAF are officially designated as "Special Forces". Additionally, several RMAF personnel are attached to the Malaysian Rapid Deployment Force (RDF) to provide technical and operational support, particularly in missions involving airborne and air-mobility operations.

== Malaysia Coast Guard ==
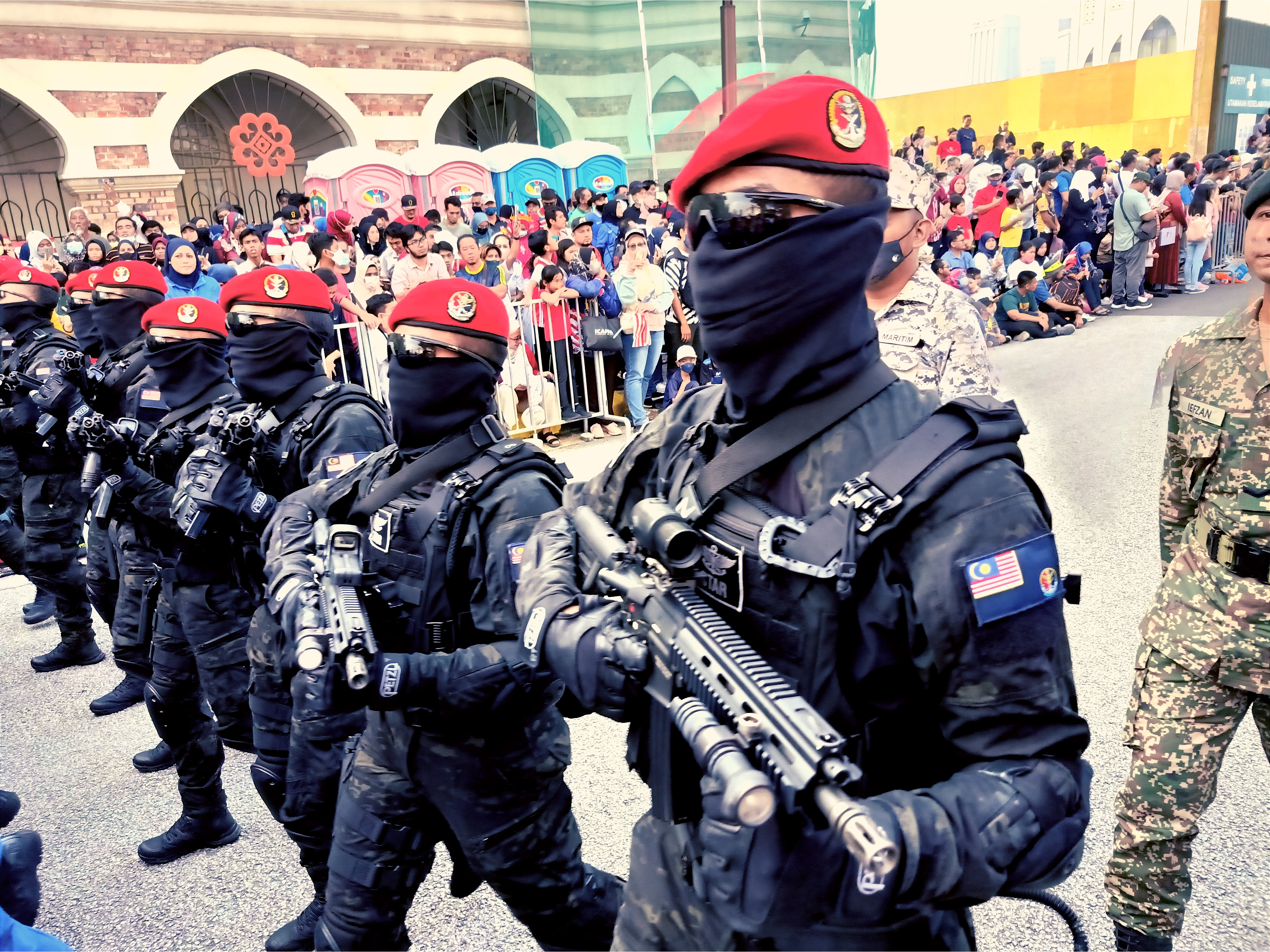
MCG Assault Team commandos, identifiable by their scarlet-red berets, march during the 65th Merdeka Day parade.

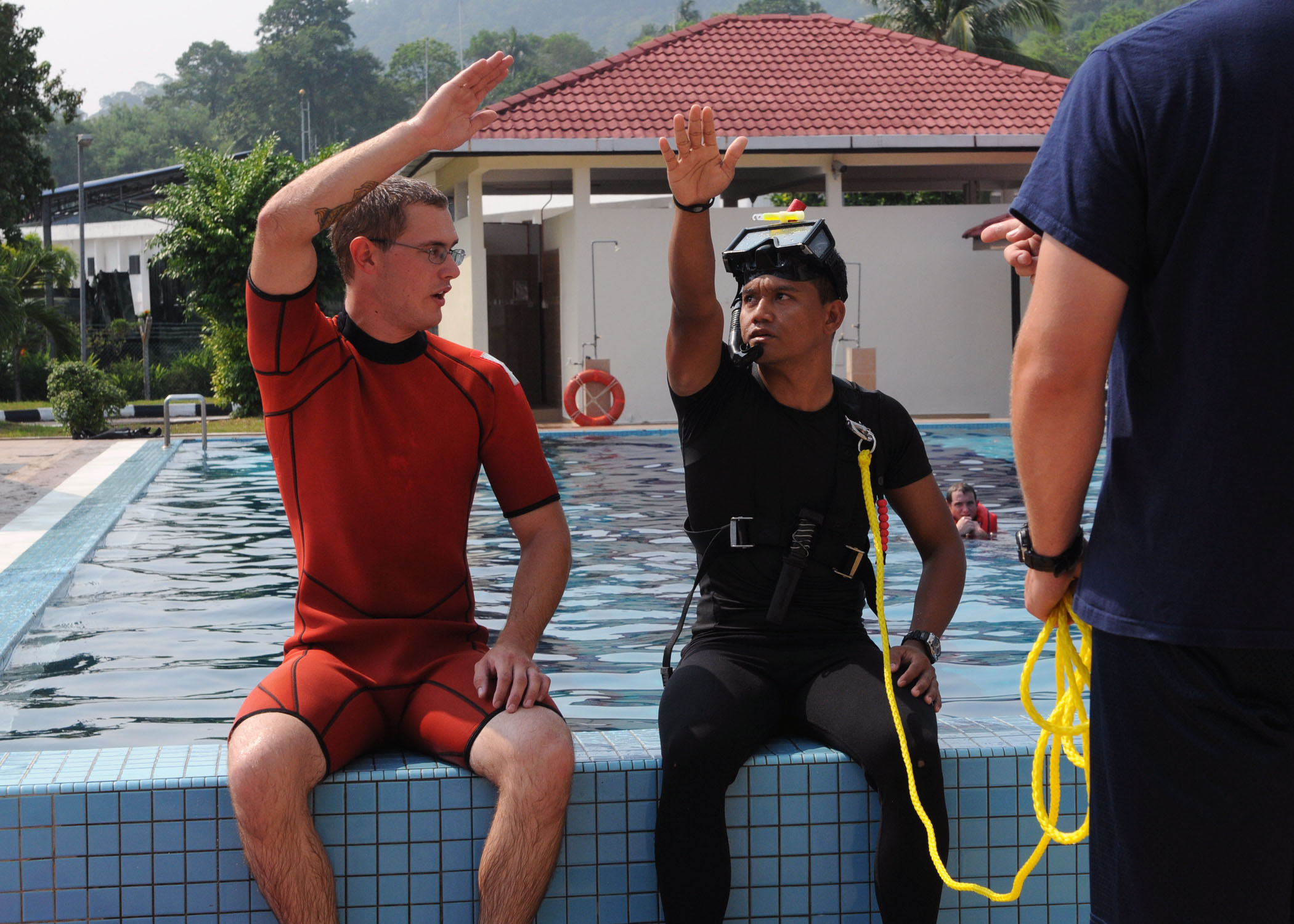
MCG Rescue Swimmer (centre) received training from U.S. Coast Guard Aviation Survival Technician (USCG Rescue Swimmer) during CARAT 2011.

The Malaysia Coast Guard (abbr.: MCG) is the operational name for the Malaysian Maritime Enforcement Agency (abbr.: MMEA; Malay: Agensi Penguatkuasaan Maritim Malaysia — APMM). It is the principal maritime force responsible for safeguarding Malaysia's littoral waters, enforcing federal laws within the Malaysian Maritime Zone (MMZ), and coordinating maritime emergency responses. Alongside the Royal Malaysian Navy and the Royal Malaysia Police Marine Operations Force, the MCG forms a critical component of the nation's naval defence. Since 2023, the MCG has expanded its operational scope to include the Indo-Pacific region through strategic collaboration with the Japan Coast Guard (JCG).

Established in 2005, the MCG operates independently of the Malaysian Armed Forces (MAF) and reports to a separate ministry, a structure similar to the relationship between the United States Coast Guard and the Department of Homeland Security. However, during times of emergency or armed conflict, the MCG can be integrated into the MAF to serve as a naval combatant force.

The MCG maintains three elite components under its Special Tasks and Rescue (STAR) division, which serves as the agency's special forces command.

=== MCG Special Tasks and Rescue Assault Team ===
The Special Tasks and Rescue Assault Team (abbr.: STAR Assault Team; Malay: Pasukan Tindakan Khas), commonly known as the STAR Team, is the primary maritime special forces unit of the MCG. These operatives are trained in maritime counter-terrorism (MCT) and specialise in visit, board, search, and seizure (VBSS) operations, anti-piracy missions, helicopter insertions, and hostage rescue at sea.

The unit was formed in 2005 with a nucleus of personnel drawn from the Naval Special Forces (PASKAL) and RMAF Special Forces (PASKAU). Recruitment is now conducted internally, requiring candidates to pass the Malaysian special forces selection process. Members are distinguished by a scarlet-red beret and an insignia similar in design to the RMN Trimedia. The STAR Team is comparable to the United States Coast Guard's Maritime Security Response Team (MSRT) and the Japan Coast Guard's Special Security Team (SST).

=== Malaysia Coast Guard Rescue Divers ===
The MCG Rescue Divers (Malay: Penyelam Penyelamat APMM) are an elite unit specialising in deep-sea search and rescue (SAR). Their mandate includes the recovery of individuals or assets from sunken vessels, downed aircraft, and submerged vehicles. As the nation's premier maritime SAR unit, they function as first responders under the Malaysia Rescue Coordination Centre (MRCC).

Established in 2009, the unit initially received training from United States Navy divers. Since 2014, training has been conducted in collaboration with the Japan Coast Guard's Special Rescue Team (SRT), with JCG instructors providing local training in Malaysia since 2023. Candidates must complete a specialised pipeline distinct from the assault team. Their roles and capabilities align closely with those of the Royal Malaysian Navy Divers.

=== Malaysia Coast Guard Rescue Swimmers ===
The MCG Rescue Swimmers (Malay: Perenang Penyelamat APMM) are a specialised aircrew unit focused on air-sea rescue operations. Stationed at air bases under the MCG Air Operations Division, these swimmers deploy from helicopters to perform rescues at sea.

Formed on 1 July 2008, the unit is distinguished by the use of papaya-orange wetsuits, a tribute to their mentors in the Japan Coast Guard SRT. This small, highly specialised unit recruits exclusively from the ranks of the MCG Rescue Divers, requiring further rigorous selection and training. Members are identified by rescue swimmer wings on their service uniforms and are considered the Malaysian equivalent of the United States Coast Guard's Aviation Survival Technicians.

== Royal Malaysia Police ==
The Royal Malaysia Police (abbr.: RMP; Malay: Polis Diraja Malaysia — PDRM) serves as the national federal police agency of Malaysia. Headquartered in Bukit Aman, it functions as a multi-purpose organisation divided into several specialised departments responsible for criminal investigation, domestic intelligence, traffic management, and paramilitary operations. Within the RMP structure, the Special Actions Unit (UTK) and 69 Commando (VAT 69) are the only elements formally designated as special forces. The Police Special Operations Command, known as Pasukan Gerakan Khas, manages these two units.

Historically, the RMP traces its origins to the armed forces of the early Malay sultanates, which performed law enforcement and public safety duties in a manner similar to a gendarmerie. Over time, these traditional structures were integrated with police forces established during the colonial era to form the modern institution. Because of this heritage, the RMP maintains a status in national security and state ceremonial functions that is considered equivalent to the Malaysian Armed Forces.

=== Police Special Forces Command ===
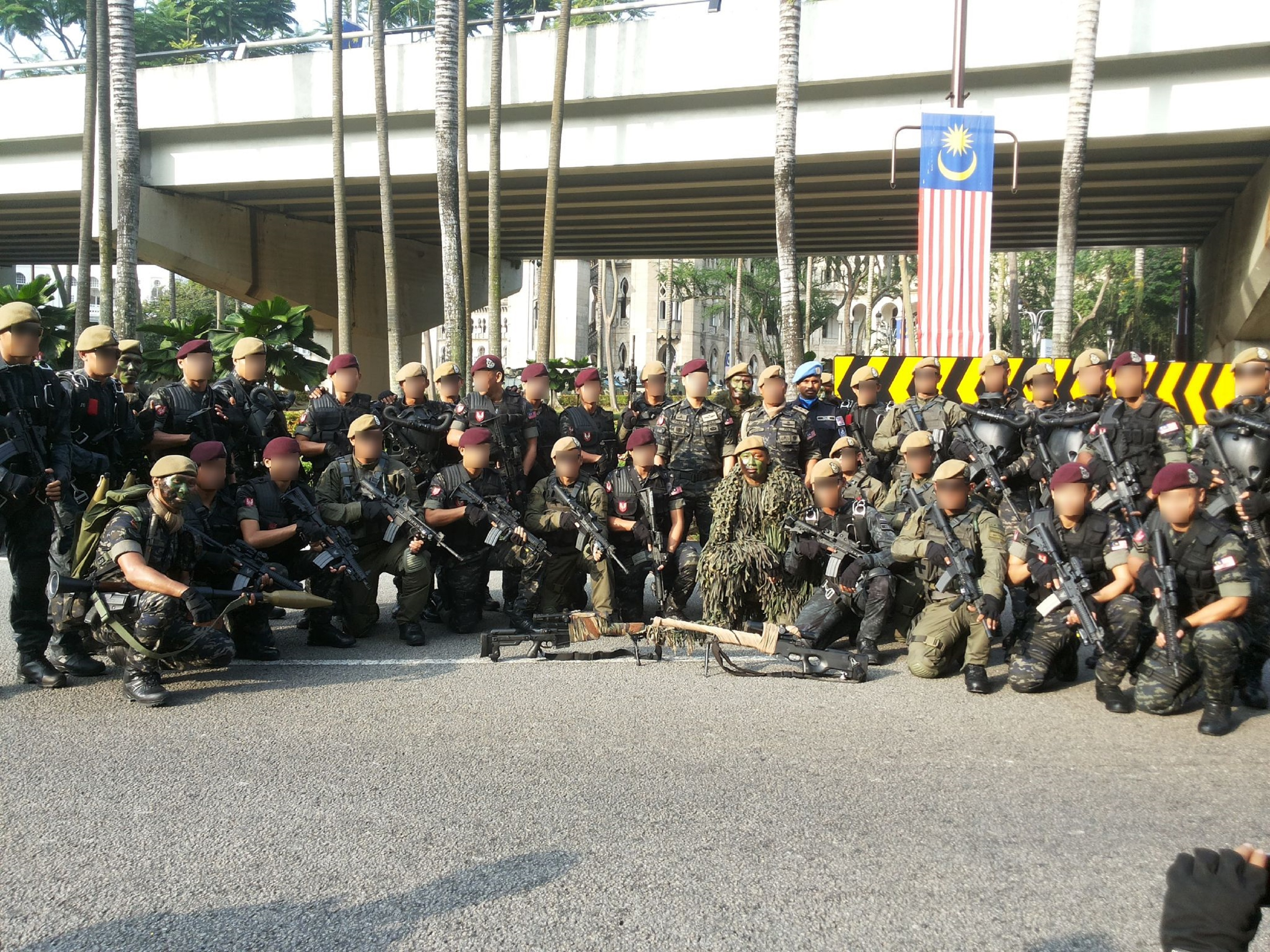
Operatives from the Special Actions Unit and the 69 Commando of Police SFC posing for group photo before the 60th Merdeka Day parade.

The Pasukan Gerakan Khas (PGK) is the special forces command of the RMP, operating under the Department of Internal Security and Public Order (Malay: Jabatan Keselamatan Dalam Negeri dan Ketenteraman Awam — KDN/KA). The PGK manages high-risk operations, including counter-terrorism and hostage rescue.

==== Special Actions Unit ====
The Special Actions Unit (Malay: Unit Tindak Khas — UTK) was established on 1 January 1975. It is the oldest counter-terrorism unit in Malaysia and functions as the primary police tactical unit for urban environments, VIP protection, and close protection for high-ranking government officials.

The UTK was initially trained by the British Army's 22nd Special Air Service (22 SAS) in urban combat, an influence that remains reflected in the unit's insignia. Unlike other special forces in Malaysia, the UTK is not classified as a commando unit, as its training is specifically tailored for urban operations. Members are identified by maroon berets with a distinctive blue-wine (Bordeaux) hue. The unit is comparable to the German Federal Police GSG 9, and the FBI Hostage Rescue Team.

==== 69 Commando ====
The 69 Commando (Komando 69), also known as Very Able Troops 69 (VAT 69), was established in 1969 as an elite counter-insurgency unit within the Police Field Force (the predecessor to the General Operations Force). In 1997, it was consolidated under the Pasukan Gerakan Khas ('Police Special Forces Command'). The unit was modelled after the SAS, with foundational training provided by the British and New Zealand SAS. The 69 Commando shares a direct historical lineage with the Malaysian Special Service Unit (MSSU), following an experiment in 1968 where a group of police officers were seconded to the MSSU for selection and training.

While the unit originally focused on jungle warfare during the Second Malayan Emergency, its operational mandate expanded to include urban counter-terrorism following the conclusion of the insurgency in 1990. Members are distinguished by sand-coloured berets, a tradition inherited from their SAS mentors. The unit's expertise in deep-jungle operations and tactical interventions makes it comparable to the Indian Commando Battalion for Resolute Action (CoBRA) and the National Police of Colombia Jungle Commandos.

=== General Operations Force ===
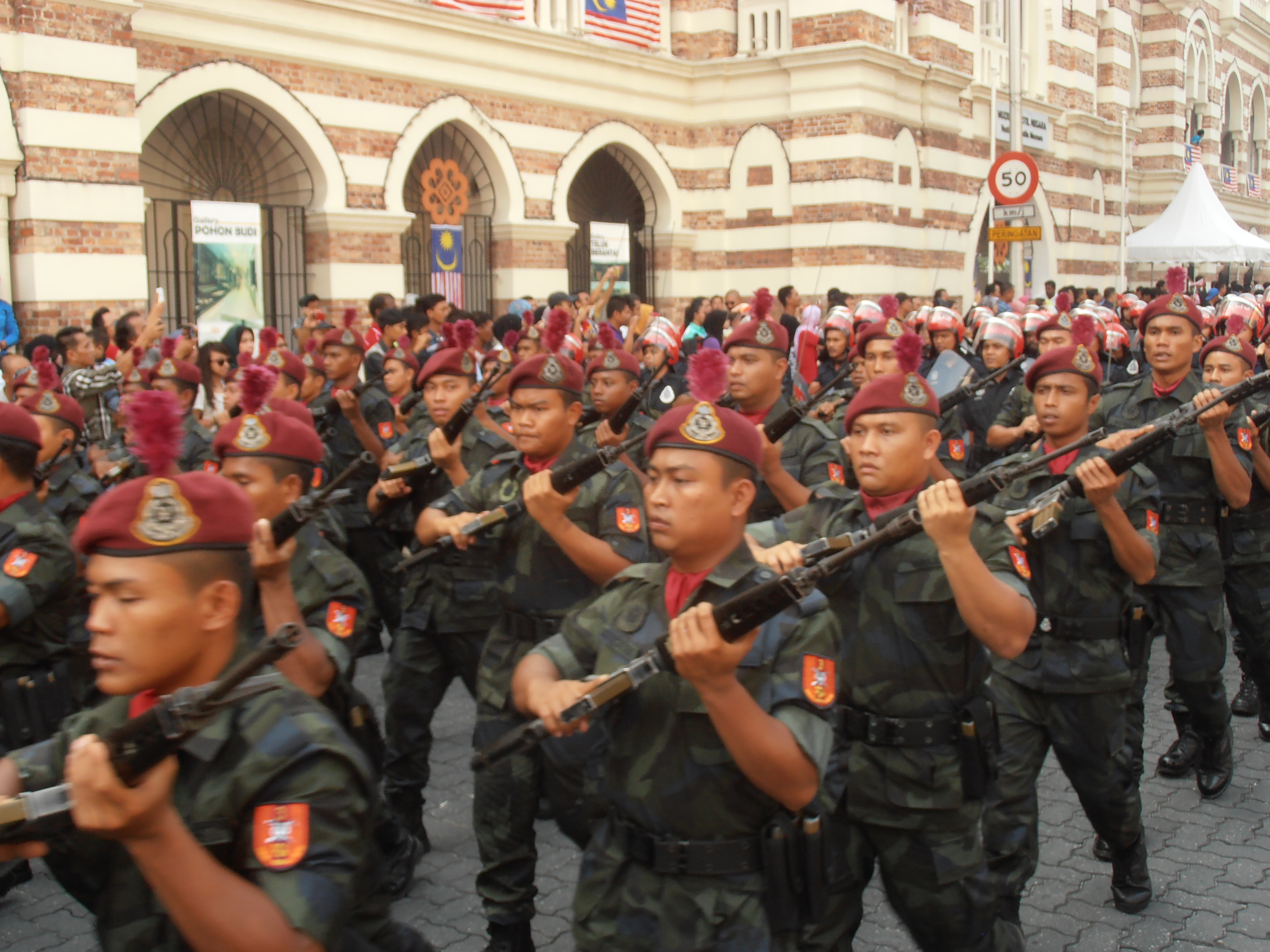
The Senoi Praaq policemen of the General Operations Force, distinguished by their maroon berets, participated in the 56th National Day of Malaysia parade.

The General Operations Force (abbr.: GOF; Malay: Pasukan Gerakan Am — PGA) is the paramilitary arm of the RMP, responsible for infantry and armoured vehicle operations. Established on 1 August 1948 during the Malayan Emergency, it was originally known as the Jungle Police Force (Pasukan Polis Hutan), with its members popularly referred to as Jungle Squads. It consists of five infantry brigades and six armoured vehicle squadrons. The GOF maintains two distinct elite units:

==== Tiger Platoons ====
Following the reassignment of VAT 69 to the Pasukan Gerakan Khas in 1997, the GOF established Tiger Platoons within each brigade to maintain specialised tactical and reconnaissance capabilities. These units handle counter-insurgency, search and rescue, and support PGK operations. They are the primary tactical units for the Sabah and Sarawak contingents. Since 2019, the RMP has expanded this capability, with a Tiger Platoon now embedded in every GOF infantry battalion. These units are comparable to the U.S. State Police SWAT teams and Germany's State Police SEK units.

==== Senoi Praaq ====
The Senoi Praaq is an elite specialised manhunt, tracking, and reconnaissance unit within the GOF. Meaning "War People" in the Semai language, this unit exclusively recruits from the Orang Asli (indigenous peoples of Malay Peninsula). Established in 1956, they are renowned jungle warfare and tracking specialists. Although they were originally trained by the Malayan Scouts (SAS) and retain the maroon beret, they now operate as specialised paramilitary battalions (3rd and 18th Battalions).

=== Marine Operations Force ===
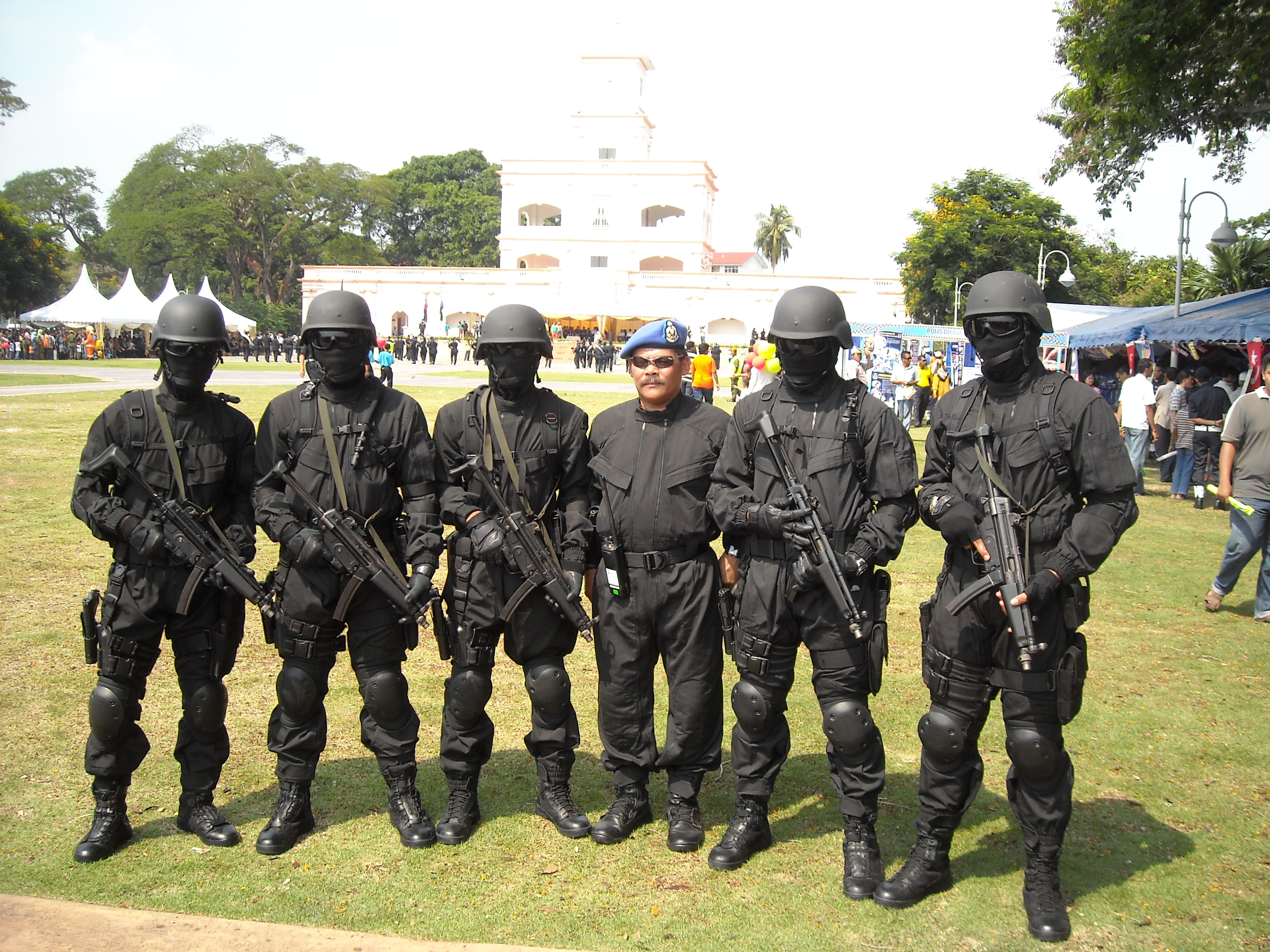
UNGERIN frogmen posing with theirs Commanding Officer, ASP Nassim, in the year 2009.

The Marine Operations Force (abbr.: MOF; Malay: Pasukan Gerakan Marin) is the maritime division of the RMP, responsible for commanding all paramilitary water police assets. It serves as one of Malaysia's militarised naval defence components, operating alongside the Royal Malaysian Navy and the Malaysian Coast Guard. Its elite component is the Marine Assault Team (Unit Gempur Marin), commonly known as UNGERIN.

==== Marine Assault Team ====
The Marine Assault Team (Malay: Unit Gempur Marin — UNGERIN) is an elite tactical unit within the MOF. Unlike the Special Actions Unit or 69 Commando, UNGERIN does not fall under the Police Special Forces Command (Pasukan Gerakan Khas), nor is it formally classified as a "special forces" unit. Instead, it is designated as a specialised maritime tactical unit.

Established in 2006, UNGERIN specialises in combat diving and is trained for operations in littoral and riverine environments. Its primary responsibilities include coastal reconnaissance, maritime counter-terrorism, and the protection of fishing vessels and coastal communities. Members wear light blue berets distinguished by combat diver skill badges. The unit's capabilities are comparable to those of Singapore's Police Coast Guard Special Task Squadron and the NYPD Scuba Team.

=== Special Branch ===
The Special Branch (abbr.: SB; Malay: Cawangan Khas) is the domestic intelligence agency of the RMP. The division is responsible for gathering and analysing intelligence to maintain national security and public order. Due to the nature of intelligence work, most of its subordinate units are classified and do not appear in public records. However, two units have achieved public recognition due to their operational significance: the now-dissolved F-Team and the Counter-Terrorism Division (E8).

==== Counter-Terrorism Division (E8) ====
The Counter-Terrorism Division, designated as E8, is a specialised intelligence and special operations division within the SB. It is tasked with the collection of intelligence and the prevention of terrorist activities within Malaysia. The division maintains close cooperation with international intelligence agencies to address cross-border threats and radicalisation.

One of the division's most significantly publicised successes was the apprehension of remnants of the Liberation Tigers of Tamil Eelam (LTTE) who sought to establish a presence in Malaysia.

Originally established as the Unit Anti-Keganasan (lit. 'Anti-Terrorism Unit') within the SB, it was elevated to a full division in 2017. The E8 utilises a multifaceted approach to security, with some operatives conducting covert field surveillance and tactical interventions, while others specialise in monitoring and disrupting extremist activities in cyberspace. In terms of mandate and operational scope, the E8 is comparable to the FBI Counterterrorism Division and the Indonesian National Police's Detachment 88 (Densus 88).

=== Crime Investigation Departments ===
The RMP maintains three distinct Criminal Investigation Departments (abbr.: CID; Malay: Jabatan Siasatan Jenayah — JSJ). These departments serve as the core of traditional law enforcement and criminal investigations within Malaysia. The three primary divisions are:

- Criminal Investigation Department: The largest division, responsible for investigating a wide range of serious crimes and general criminal activities.
- Narcotics Criminal Investigation Department: A specialised branch focused on combating drug-related offences, including the trafficking, production, and distribution of illicit substances.
- Commercial Crime Investigation Department: A division dedicated to the investigation of financial and white-collar crimes, such as fraud, money laundering, and embezzlement.

Each CID maintains its own tactical capabilities to provide specialised support for operations specific to its mandate.

==== Special Firearms Operations Units ====
The Special Firearms Operations Units (abbr.: SFOU; Malay: Unit Operasi Bersenjata Khas) are specialised teams of armed personnel trained to provide tactical firearm support to all three CIDs. Tasked with high-risk interventions, their responsibilities include armed raids and the apprehension of dangerous suspects. SFOU teams are composed of regular officers and detectives who undergo advanced training in tactical firearms, close quarters battle (CQB), and small-unit tactics. A notable example is the D-14 SFOU, which manages operations specifically related to organised crime.

The SFOU was established as the successor to several disbanded specialised units, including the Special Task Force on Organised Crime (STAFOC), the Special Tactical Intelligence Narcotics Group (STING), and the Special Task Force for Anti-Vice, Gaming, and Gangsterism (STAGG). These units were dissolved in 2018, and the SFOU now integrates their mission sets with enhanced operational security. The SFOU is considered the Malaysian equivalent of the Specialist Firearms Command (SCO19) of the Metropolitan Police Service in the United Kingdom.

== Fire and Rescue Department of Malaysia ==
The Fire and Rescue Department of Malaysia (abbr.: FRDM; Malay: Jabatan Bomba dan Penyelamat Malaysia) is the federal agency responsible for fire suppression, technical rescue, and the enforcement of fire safety regulations. Beyond general firefighting, the department maintains several specialised units known collectively as the FRDM Special Forces (Pasukan Khas JBPM). These units handle high-risk scenarios, including hazardous material leaks, aerial insertions, and complex maritime rescues.

Members of the special forces are distinguished by specific unit patches on the right shoulder. Personnel trained in jungle survival often incorporate a tactical knife icon into their insignia.

=== Water Rescue Unit ===
The Water Rescue Unit (abbr.: WRU; Malay: Pasukan Penyelamat Di Air — PPDA) was established in 1987 as the department's first specialised wing. It focuses on underwater search and recovery (SAR) and surface water operations. Historically, these duties were split between the FRDM Scuba Unit (Unit Scuba Bomba) and the FRDM Special Boat Helmsman team (Jurumudi Khas Bomba) until they merged in 2006 to streamline command. WRU divers and helmsman are currently attached to major fire stations across Malaysia and frequently assist the Royal Malaysia Police in retrieving evidence or casualties from inland and coastal waters. The unit's speciality and roles make them comparable to international counterparts like the New York City Fire Department's (FDNY) Marine Division and Tokyo Fire Department's Marine Rescue Team.

=== Hazardous Materials Unit ===
Formed on 29 October 1992, the HAZMAT Unit manages chemical spills, radiological threats, and industrial accidents. The unit's foundation was built by twelve firefighters who underwent specialist training at the Fire Services College in Moreton-in-Marsh, United Kingdom. It remains the only FRDM element authorised to support the Malaysian Armed Forces during wartime for Chemical, Biological, Radiological, Nuclear, and Explosive (CBRNE) decontamination.

=== Special Air Unit ===
The Special Air Unit (Malay: Pasukan Khas Udara Bomba — PASKUB) was established on 11 September 1998 to manage the department's helicopter operations. The unit recruits exclusively from existing FRDM special rescue units, resulting in a highly experienced cadre of pilots, aircrews, paramedics, winch operators, and rescue swimmers. PASKUB is responsible for a wide range of aerial missions, including search and rescue (SAR), aerial and high-rise firefighting, and the rapid insertion of personnel into operational areas. The unit is currently distributed across three regional airbases to ensure comprehensive coverage of Malaysia.

=== Canine Unit ===
The Canine Unit (abbr.: K9 Unit; Malay: Unit Pengesan Bomba) focuses on fire forensics, person and goods detection, and urban SAR. Established on 26 April 2002, both the handlers and their dogs are trained to navigate difficult terrain such as caves, rainforests, and swamps. While modern detection equipment is used, the "Canine" designation is maintained to acknowledge the historical role of the animals in the service.

=== Rapid Intervention Motorcycle Team ===
The Rapid Intervention Motorcycle (RIM) team was launched on 29 November 2004 to address urban traffic congestion. Firefighters use modified sports bikes to reach incident sites ahead of heavy engines. Equipment is split across three motorcycles and assembled upon arrival to begin immediate suppression or first aid. The concept received international recognition for innovation in 2000.

=== Emergency Medical Rescue Services Team ===
The Emergency Medical Rescue Services (EMRS) was formed in 2006. Unlike standard ambulance services, EMRS firefighters are cross-trained in specialist rescue, allowing them to treat casualties in "hot zones" such as collapsed buildings or hazardous spill sites. Their primary role is the safety of fire crews, though they provide secondary support to the public.

=== Smoke Jumper Team ===
The Smoke Jumper Team consists of specialised airborne firefighters trained in parachute insertion to combat wildfires in remote or inaccessible terrain. The unit comprises approximately 500 personnel stationed at major fire stations across Malaysia, with a rapid-response contingent permanently based at the department's three airbases.

The unit's origins date to 2 October 2000, when five members of the Multi-Skill Team (MUST) underwent static-line parachute training at the RMAF Kuala Lumpur. This training was conducted by the RMAF Special Air Service (renamed PASKAU in 2002). Following the initial phase, a further 22 MUST firefighters completed the course between September 2001 and May 2002. The success of these early detachments led to the formal establishment of the Smoke Jumper Team in 2007, providing the FRDM with a dedicated aerial suppression capability for the country's interior regions. The unit's capabilities are comparable to those of the Bureau of Land Management's Smokejumpers.

=== Special Tactical Operation and Rescue Team of Malaysia ===
The Special Tactical Operation and Rescue Team (STORM) was formed in March 2011 to serve as a special rescue unit within the FRDM. The unit is tasked with a wide array of technical search and rescue (SAR) duties, encompassing urban SAR (USAR), mountain and cave rescues, and high-rise incidents. Beyond traditional rescue work, STORM maintains the capacity for shipboard firefighting, aircraft emergencies, and jungle fire suppression. The team regularly conducts joint operations with the Special Malaysia Disaster Assistance and Rescue Team (SMART), which serves as the federal-level heavy USAR body.

Commonly referred to as the Komando Bomba (lit. 'Firefighters' Commando'), the unit initially drew its members solely from veteran personnel within the FRDM's existing special forces. These candidates were required to complete intensive training at the SMART headquarters to qualify for service. While the selection process was originally restricted to experienced staff, the department has recently opened recruitment to high-potential new entrants.

The unit's capabilities were further bolstered in November 2024 following the merger of the department's Multi-Skill Team (MUST) into STORM. This integration added maritime firefighting, helicopter marshalling, and aerial deployment to the unit's core mandate. In terms of operational scope and technical specialisation, STORM is comparable to international emergency units such as the Tokyo Fire Department's Special Rescue and Mountain Rescue units.

=== Auxiliary Fire Brigade Special Forces ===
The Auxiliary Fire Brigade (Malay: Pasukan Bomba Bantuan — PBB) is composed of part-time firefighters who provide essential support to the full-time service. Within this auxiliary structure are two elite units dedicated to mountain and wilderness rescue.

==== Mountain Search and Rescue Team ====
The Mountain Search and Rescue Team (abbr.: MoSAR; Malay: Pasukan Bantuan Mencari dan Menyelamat Gunung) is an elite formation specialised in SAR operations within the mountainous regions of Sabah. Formed on 23 June 2015, the unit specifically recruits individuals with significant prior mountaineering experience. Upon selection, members complete formal firefighter training at the Fire and Rescue Academy of Malaysia (FRAM) before being commissioned as auxiliary firefighters. In terms of operational capability and status, MoSAR is regarded as equivalent to other special forces within the FRDM.

The unit was originally established with 20 auxiliary firefighters, all of whom served as professional mountain guides on Mount Kinabalu. MoSAR has since gained international standing for its expertise in executing complex rescues within the difficult terrain of Sabah. By 2022, the unit's strength had increased to 42 personnel. Its primary base of operations is situated on the slopes of Mount Kinabalu at an altitude of 3,382 metres (11,096 ft) above sea level, making it the highest fire station operated by the FRDM in Malaysia.

==== Mointain and Cave Search and Rescue Team ====
The Mountain and Cave Search and Rescue Team (abbr.: MOCSAR; Malay: Pasukan Mencari dan Menyelamat di Gunung dan Gua) is a specialised unit under the PBB that operates primarily within the national forest reserves of Sarawak. The team was officially established on 12 July 2020. Its formation was accelerated by a 2019 incident in Mulu National Park, where a flash flood resulted in the deaths of a tourist and a local guide.

While the concept for MOCSAR had been proposed in 2017 following joint training between the STORM unit and Mulu National Park rangers, the unit was only formalised after the 2019 tragedy. MOCSAR draws its recruits from local communities residing near Sarawak's national forest reserves to leverage their indigenous knowledge of the landscape. As of 2024, the unit comprises 21 trained auxiliary firefighters.

== Other federal government elite units ==
=== Malaysian Prison Department ===
Operating under the Ministry of Home Affairs, the Malaysian Prison Department is a federal law enforcement body responsible for managing prisons, detention centers, and drug rehabilitation facilities across the country. Historically, the department functioned as part of the federal police until Malaya gained independence in 1957, at which point it became an independent government entity. Beyond its standard correctional duties, the department maintains specialised tactical units.

==== Rapid Action Troops ====
The Rapid Action Troops, known by its Malay acronym TTC (Terup Tindakan Cepat), is the department's primary elite tactical unit. Founded on 3 October 2005, the TTC focuses on close-quarters combat (CQC) and counter-terrorism. Its personnel undergo training at Malaysia's leading special operations facilities, including the Special Warfare Training Centre (PULPAK) in Malacca and the 69 Commando Training Centre in Ulu Kinta, Perak.

The troop is tasked with several critical functions, such as the transport of high-risk inmates, the extraction of uncooperative prisoners, and the management of prison riots or hostage crises. They also conduct thorough cell searches and assist the Control and Prevention Unit (UKP) during mass arrests or crowd control operations. TTC officers are identified by their scarlet berets and occupy a similar role to international units like the Russian OSN Saturn or the American Special Operations Response Teams.

=== Immigration Department of Malaysia ===
The Immigration Department of Malaysia (IDM) serves as the federal authority for monitoring the movement of individuals at national entry and exit points. It enforces the Immigration Act 1959/63 and the Passport Act 1966. To address high-risk security threats at the borders, the IDM established a dedicated rapid response team.

==== Special Tactical Team ====
Commonly known as PASTAK (Malay: Pasukan Taktikal Khas Jabatan Imigresen; lit. 'Special Tactical Team of the Immigration Department'), the Special Tactical Team is the elite tactical unit of the IDM. These officers are stationed at major airports, seaports, and land crossings to provide immediate tactical intervention and firearm expertise during emergencies.

PASTAK was officially inaugurated on 13 February 2018. It was modelled after the successful Negeri Sembilan branch tactical unit, the Gerup Taktikal Khas (GTK), which had been active since 2014. The unit handles sensitive cases, including preventing terrorist entrance and conducting raids on foreign nationals linked to dangerous organisations. The first cohort of 40 recruits received counter-terrorism training from the General Operations Force and the Royal Intelligence Corps' 91st Intelligence Operations Group. Successful graduates wear dark brown berets and occupy a similar role to international unit like the American ICE Special Response Teams.

=== Royal Malaysian Customs Department ===
The Royal Malaysian Customs Department (RMCD) operates under the Ministry of Finance and is responsible for revenue collection and the enforcement of over 35 different laws. Unlike other agencies, its primary focus is the regulation of goods rather than people, and it remains the only armed agency under the Ministry of Finance.

==== Customs Operational Battle Force Response Assault ====
The Customs Operational Battle Force Response Assault (abbr.: COBRA; Malay: Pasukan Tempur Operasi Medan Kastam) is the elite tactical unit of the RMCD, established on 28 November 2016. The unit provides armed protection for customs officers during raids and safeguards Ministry of Finance personnel from security threats. COBRA operatives train alongside the 69 Commando in Ulu Kinta, distinguishable by their indigo berets. The unit is comparable to the German Zentrale Unterstützungsgruppe Zoll.

=== Civil Defence Force of Malaysia ===
The Civil Defence Force (MCDF) is a uniformed volunteer service within the Prime Minister's Department. It focuses on disaster management and emergency response, often working in tandem with the Fire and Rescue Department and the Ministry of Health.

==== Special Disaster and Emergency Response Team ====
The Special Disaster and Emergency Response Team (abbr.: SPIDER Team; Malay: Pasukan Khas APM) is the special rescue unit of the MCDF. Originally formed in 2008 as Pasukan Khas Pertahanan Awam (abbr.: PASPA; lit. 'Civil Defence Special Forces'), the unit was rebranded to its current name in 2017. While proficient in jungle search and rescue, their primary expertise lies in urban search and rescue (USAR). Selection involves a rigorous six-month course led by instructors from the Special Malaysia Disaster Assistance and Rescue Team (SMART). Its personnel are distinguished by cerulean blue berets.

=== National Anti-Drug Agency ===
The National Anti-Drug Agency (AADK) is the federal body under the Ministry of Home Affairs dedicated to drug prevention and rehabilitation. It maintains an independent operational capability similar to the American Drug Enforcement Administration.

==== Special Tactical Response and Investigation Key Enforcers ====
The Special Tactical Response and Investigation Key Enforcers (STRIKE) is the agency's elite firearms unit, founded on 18 October 2016. The unit is responsible for high-risk investigations and raids aimed at dismantling major drug trafficking networks.

=== Malaysian Anti-Corruption Commission ===
The Malaysian Anti-Corruption Commission (MACC) is an independent body under the Prime Minister's Department tasked with investigating corruption in both the public and private sectors.

==== Anti-Corruption Tactical Squad ====
The Anti-Corruption Tactical Squad (ACTS) was formed on 28 February 2024 to provide security for MACC officers during high-profile or dangerous operations. ACTS personnel specialise in CQC and received their training from the 69 Commando. During their inaugural induction, led by Chief Commissioner Azam Baki, operatives were presented with blue sapphire berets, combat knives, and official ACTS badges.

== Johor Military Force ==
The Johor Military Force (abbr.: JMF; Malay: Askar Timbalan Setia Negeri Johor) is an independent military formation maintained by the State of Johor. It primarily undertakes ceremonial responsibilities, including the protection of royal residences, the royal yacht, and various military installations belonging to the Johor Royal Family. The force also provides guards of honour for visiting domestic and international dignitaries.

While the JMF operates solely within the borders of Johor during peacetime, it can be integrated into the Malaysian Army as an infantry element during national emergencies or periods of armed conflict. Despite being a private military entity under the authority of the Sultan of Johor, its members are considered civil servants and are remunerated by the state government. This status distinguishes the JMF from other Malaysian law enforcement and defence organisations.

Following a modernisation initiative in 2008, the JMF expanded its operational roles to include close protection duties. This expansion necessitated the creation of a tactical division within the force.

=== JMF Elite Unit ===
The JMF Elite Unit serves as the special forces of the JMF. Established on 7 July 2008 as the JMF Elite Forces, the unit was formed at the behest of Tunku Ismail Idris, who drew inspiration from the Swiss Guard of Vatican City. Its core mission is the close protection of the Sultan of Johor and the Johor Royal Family. In 2023, the unit was renamed the JMF Elite Unit to ensure consistency with the nomenclature of other JMF subunits.

Members are trained in special operations and can be attached to the 21st Special Service Group (21 SSG), the special forces command of the Malaysian Army, during times of war or emergency. Such a deployment is subject to the approval of the Sultan of Johor, who serves as the Colonel-in-Chief of the 21 SSG and the Gerak Khas.

Recruitment is restricted to active-duty JMF personnel. Candidates are required to pass the Malaysian Special Forces Selection, a rigorous assessment process used to identify individuals capable of performing high-intensity specialist roles.

== Inactive units ==
This list identifies elite Malaysian formations that have been dissolved or have had their operations suspended.

=== F-Team ===
The E3F squad, known by the codename F-Team, functioned as a clandestine human intelligence (HUMINT) unit within the Royal Malaysian Police (RMP) Special Branch. Formed in 1971 by Superintendent Leong Chee Woh (later Datuk), the unit's primary objective was to infiltrate and gather intelligence on the Communist Party of Malaya (CPM). Recruitment primarily drew from the RMP Jungle Squad, now the General Operations Force, and occasionally included surrendered CPM members. On specific operations, the team worked in conjunction with the Malaysian Army's Gerak Khas commandos.

The unit's existence was a state secret for over 45 years until its public acknowledgement in 2016. Following its dissolution in 1995, its legacy has been compared to international clandestine services such as Russian Federal Security Service (FSB).

=== Unit Tindakan Cepat ===
The Unit Tindakan Cepat (lit. 'Quick Actions Unit'), or UTC, operated as the tactical wing for the RMP Criminal Investigation Department (CID) D9 Branch. Although it was established in 1970 to counter Chinese triad activity, the unit's remit expanded during the 1980s to include Indian and Malay organised crime syndicates. UTC teams were distributed among state police contingents to lead high-risk arrests. The unit was eventually disbanded in 1995, with its tactical responsibilities absorbed into broader CID operations.

=== Pasukan Tindakan Khas ===
Established on 10 April 2016, the Pasukan Tindakan Khas (abbr.: PTK; lit. 'Special Action Force') served as the specialised enforcement arm of the Road Transport Department (JPJ). The unit targeted sophisticated automotive crimes, including luxury vehicle theft, cross-border smuggling, and the cloning of vehicle identification numbers (VIN). PTK operatives often conducted undercover work alongside the RMP CID D7 Branch and performed high-speed interceptions on national highways.

Candidates underwent rigorous training at the General Operations Force Training Centre in Ulu Kinta. However, the unit's activities were suspended in July 2017 following reports of member misconduct. While there have been discussions in 2025 regarding a potential reinstatement, the PTK remains inactive.

=== Special Task Force on Organised Crime ===
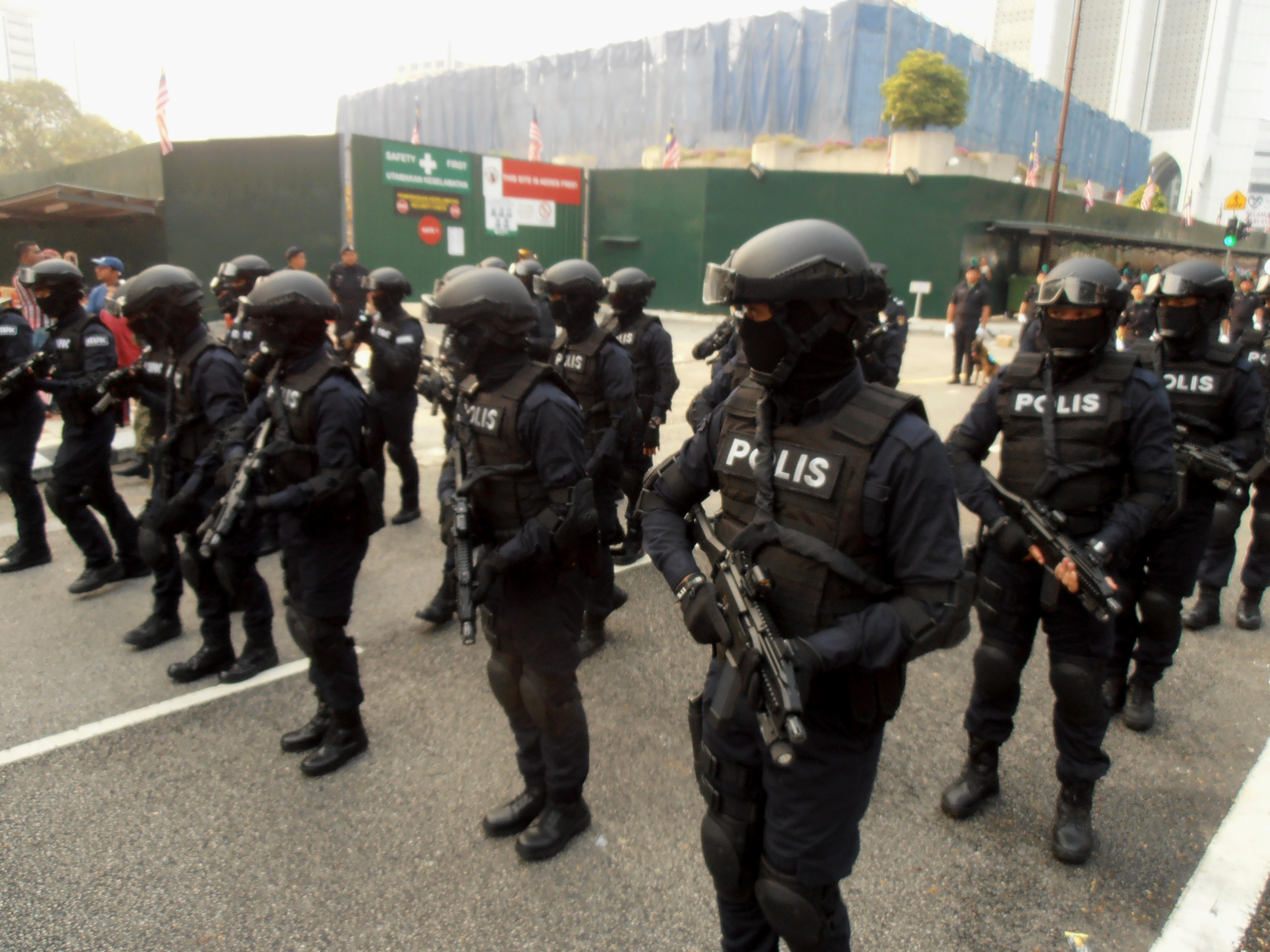
STAFOC, STING, and STAGG officers in full uniform marching together at 58th National Day.

The Special Task Force on Organised Crime (abbr.: STAFOC; Malay: Pasukan Tugas Khas Melawan Jenayah Terancang), was a specialised tactical unit of the Royal Malaysia Police (RMP). Commissioned in 2014, the unit was created to bolster the operational capabilities of the Criminal Investigation Department (CID). A primary objective of its formation was to ensure operational independence and mitigate the risk of information leaks to organised crime syndicates.

During its four-year tenure, STAFOC was instrumental in the disruption and dismantling of several high-level criminal networks across Malaysia. Despite its operational record, the unit was disbanded in June 2018 as part of a broader restructuring of the RMP following a change in the federal government.

=== Special Tactics and Intelligence Narcotics Group ===
The Special Tactics and Intelligence Narcotics Group (abbr.: STING; Malay: Pasukan Khas Taktikal dan Perisikan Narkotik) operated as a specialised tactical unit within the RMP. Formed in January 2014, it functioned as the elite operational arm of the Narcotics Criminal Investigation Division (NCID).

The unit was designed to conduct high-risk raids and gather intelligence on international and domestic drug trafficking syndicates. Much like STAFOC, STING was granted a degree of operational autonomy to maintain secrecy and prevent the compromise of investigations. The group worked in tandem with the NCID until June 2018, when it was dissolved following a change in the federal government.

=== Special Task Force for Anti-Vice, Gambling, and Gangsterism ===
The Special Task Force for Anti-Vice, Gambling, and Gangsterism (abbr.: STAGG; Malay: Pasukan Khas Anti Maksiat, Perjudian dan Gengsterisme), was a specialised tactical element of the RMP. Launched in December 2014, the unit supported the Criminal Investigation Department's (CID) D7 Branch. Its primary mandate involved the suppression of illegal gambling, vice activities, and the influence of secret societies.

Mirroring the structural model of STAFOC and STING, STAGG was designed to operate with a high level of confidentiality to bypass local criminal informants. The unit led numerous coordinated raids across the country until June 2018, when it was disbanded as part of the internal security reforms following the 14th general election.

=== National Special Operations Forces ===
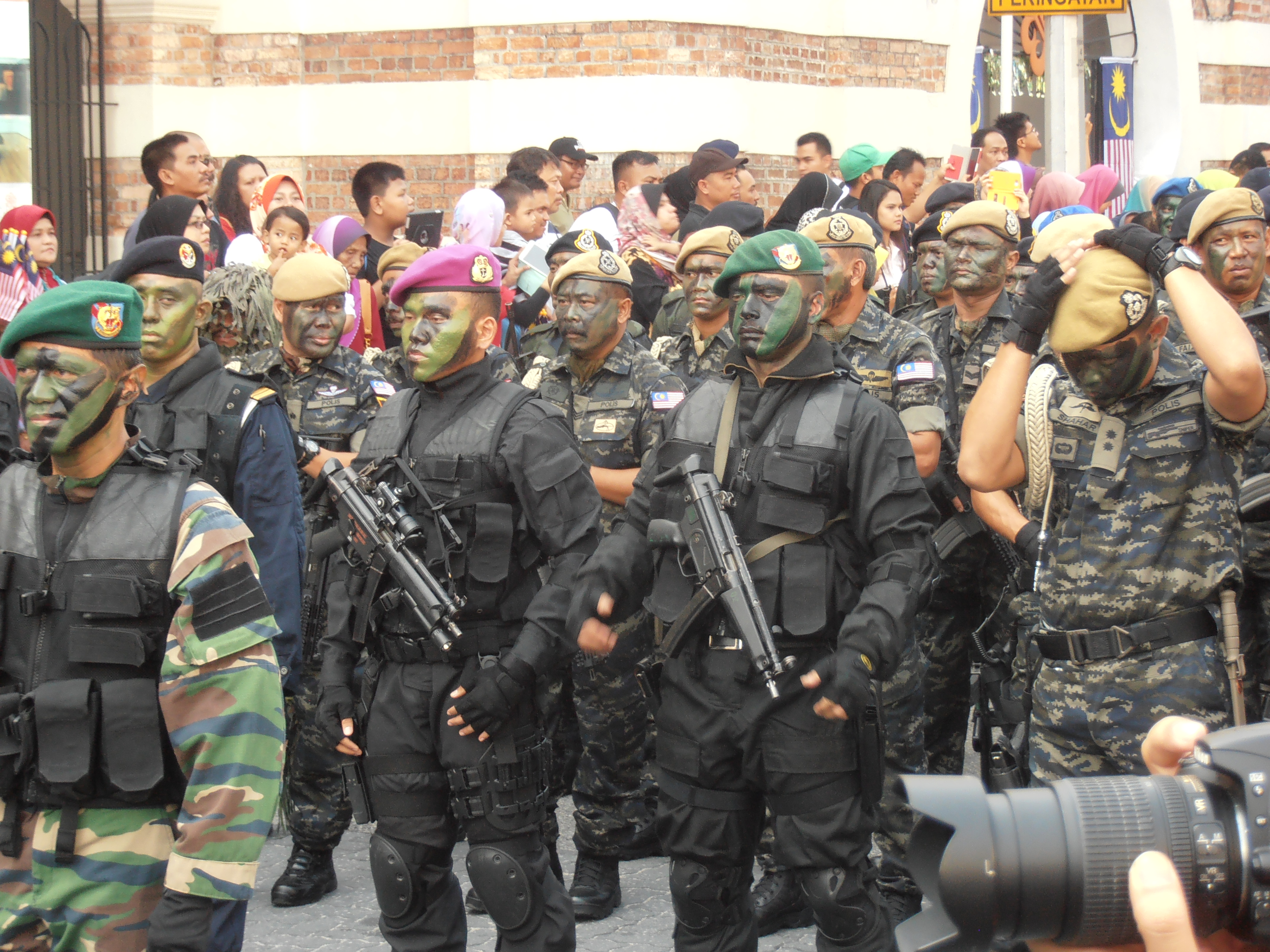
Commandos attached to the NSOF ready to march on 56th National Day.

The National Special Operations Forces (NSOF) was a multi-service counterterrorism task force inaugurated in October 2016. It was designed as a rapid-response unit to counter the rise of ISIS-linked threats in Southeast Asia. The NSOF was unique because it drew elite personnel from across the security spectrum, including the army's 11th Special Service Regiment, the navy's Naval Special Forces (PASKAL), the air force's RMAF Special Forces (PASKAU), the coast guard's Special Tasks and Rescue (STAR), and the police's 69 Commando and Special Actions Unit (UTK).

Operating out of Camp Perdana in Kuala Lumpur, the NSOF reported to the National Movement Planning Committee (Jawatankuasa Perancang Gerakan Kebangsaan — JPGK). This committee ensured the unit was under the direct oversight of the Chief of Defence Forces, the Inspector General of Police, and the Prime Minister. The force was disbanded in October 2018, with its role subsequently filled by the Defence Special Operations Division (DSOD). The NSOF capabilities are comparable to international high-readiness units such as the American Delta Force and Russian Alpha Group.

=== RMAF Close Escort Team ===
Following the 1993 restructuring of the RMAF HANDAU into the RMAF Provost, the Close Escort Team (CET) was formed as a dedicated protection unit. Its mission included the security of high-ranking officials and sensitive RMAF assets. Qualification required a three-week course covering tactical driving, threat analysis, and firearms proficiency. Graduates were distinguished by a red beret and a specific RMAF Regiment cap badge backing.

The CET was dissolved around 2020 during a structural reorganisation. Rather than maintaining a standalone unit, the RMAF integrated CET skill sets across the entire Provost branch, allowing all personnel within the restructured Ground Defence Force to perform protection duties.

=== Multi-Skill Team ===
The Multi-Skill Team (MUST) was an elite special rescue unit of the Fire and Rescue Department of Malaysia (FRDM), specialised in helicopter-borne operations and firefighting in extreme environments. Formed on 11 September 1998 to secure the Commonwealth Games in Kuala Lumpur, it provided a high-readiness capability for high-rise rescues and athlete safety.

In November 2024, the FRDM disbanded MUST to eliminate operational redundancies with the Special Air Unit (PASKUB) and the Special Tactical Operation and Rescue Team (STORM). Personnel were absorbed into STORM to streamline department resources.

== Relationship between Elite Forces and Malaysian Royalty ==
Malaysia's constitutional monarchy plays a formal and symbolic role within the Malaysian Armed Forces (MAF). Traditionally, various sultans are appointed as colonels-in-chief of specific corps and regiments. Beyond these formal appointments, several members of the royalty have served as patrons of elite units, fostering close institutional ties. Some royals have also undergone formal selection and served as active or honorary members of these formations.

- Putra of Perlis: Tuanku Sir Syed Harun Putra (b. 1920, d. 2000), who reigned as Raja of Perlis from 1945 to 2000, was appointed the inaugural Colonel-in-Chief of the Royal Ranger Regiment (RRR) in 1960. He maintained a lifelong association with the regiment, particularly the 8th Battalion (Parachute) of the 10th Parachute Brigade.
- Salahuddin of Selangor: Sultan Salahuddin Abdul Aziz Shah (b. 1926, d. 2001) climbed to the rank of major in the British Army's colonial-era Malay Regiment before becoming the first Air Commodore-in-Chief of the Royal Malaysian Air Force (RMAF) in 1966. He was a central figure in the foundation of the Naval Special Forces (PASKAL), serving as its first patron, a tradition maintained by his successors.
- Ahmad Shah of Pahang: Sultan Ahmad Shah Al-Musta'in Billah (b. 1930, d. 2019) was appointed Air Commodore-in-Chief of the RMAF in 1984, he became the patron of the RMAF Regiment and the RMAF Special Forces (PASKAU) in 2008.
- Iskandar of Johor: Sultan Iskandar (b. 1932, d. 2010) became the first Colonel Commandant of the 21st Special Service Group (21 SSG) and the patron of the Gerak Khas in 1984. In recognition of his patronage, Camp Sri Mersing, the headquarters of the 21 SSG, was renamed Camp Sri Iskandar.
- Sharafuddin of Selangor: Sultan Sharafuddin Idris Shah (b. 1945), the current Sultan of Selangor, succeeded his father as the patron of PASKAL in 2001. He is the only member of the Malaysian royalty to have been awarded the PASKAL insignia and is credited with overseeing the modernisation of the unit's equipment and facilities.
- Nazrin Shah of Perak: Sultan Nazrin Shah (b. 1956), the current Sultan of Perak, has served as the patron of the Royal Malaysia Police 69 Commando (VAT 69) since 1992. Following his graduation from the University of Oxford, he conducted an official visit to the VAT 69's headquarters at Ulu Kinta on 24 October 1992, where he was made an honorary member and presented with the unit's sand-coloured beret. In recognition of his long-standing support and patronage, the unit's new garrison was officially named Camp Sultan Nazrin Shah (Kem Sultan Nazrin Shah).
- Ibrahim Iskandar of Johor: Sultan Ibrahim (b. 1958) is the current King of Malaysia. He underwent military training at the United States Army, completing the Officer Candidate School, infantry, airborne, and ranger courses. He serves as the Colonel Commandant of Gerak Khas and the patron of 21 SSG. His tenure is noted for significant personal financial contributions toward the unit's development.
- Abdullah of Pahang: Al-Sultan Abdullah Ri'ayatuddin Al-Mustafa Billah Shah (b. 1959) is the current Sultan of Pahang and served as the 16th King of Malaysia (2019–2024). A graduate of the Royal Military Academy Sandhurst, his active military career began in 1979 within the Malaysian Army. Upon his ascension to the throne in 2019, he was appointed Air Commodore-in-Chief of the RMAF. In addition to this role, he maintains his royal family's tradition as the Colonel-in-Chief of the RMAF Regiment and its special operations wing, PASKAU.
- Tunku Ismail Idris: Tunku Ismail Idris (b. 1984), Crown Prince of Johor and a graduate of the Indian Military Academy, he established the JMF Elite Unit in 2008. He also completed a three-month special forces training with the Malaysian Army 21 SSG in the same year.
- Tunku Abdul Jalil: Tunku Abdul Jalil (b. 1990, d. 2015), the fourth child of Sultan Ibrahim, he remains the only member of a main royal household to serve as a police officer, joining the Special Actions Unit (UTK) in 2013.
- Tengku Amir: Tengku Amir Shah (b. 1990), Crown Prince of Selangor, received military training at the Royal Military Academy Sandhurst. After graduating, he qualified for the Rapid Deployment Force selection in 2016 and was assigned into the 17th Battalion (Parachute), Royal Malay Regiment. In 2025, he transferred his commission to the Royal Malaysian Navy to align with the Selangor Sultanate's patronage of the branch, though he retains honorary status within the Rapid Deployment Force, owing to the 10th Para Brigade's recent addition of marine amphibious operations.
- Tunku Abdul Rahman: Tunku Abdul Rahman Hassanal Jefri (b. 1993), the fifth child of Sultan Ibrahim, earned the green beret after training with Gerak Khas in 2011 and currently holds the rank of Colonel within the JMF.
- Tengku Hassanal: Tengku Hassanal Ibrahim Alam Shah (b. 1995), Crown Prince of Pahang, originally commissioned into the Malaysian Army, where he qualified as a sniper in 2021, volunteered for PASKAU selection in 2025. He successfully completed the three-month course and currently holds the rank of major in the RMAF.

== See also ==
- United Kingdom Special Forces
- United States special operations forces
