= Damage control (maritime) =

Emergency management of situations which may cause the loss of a ship

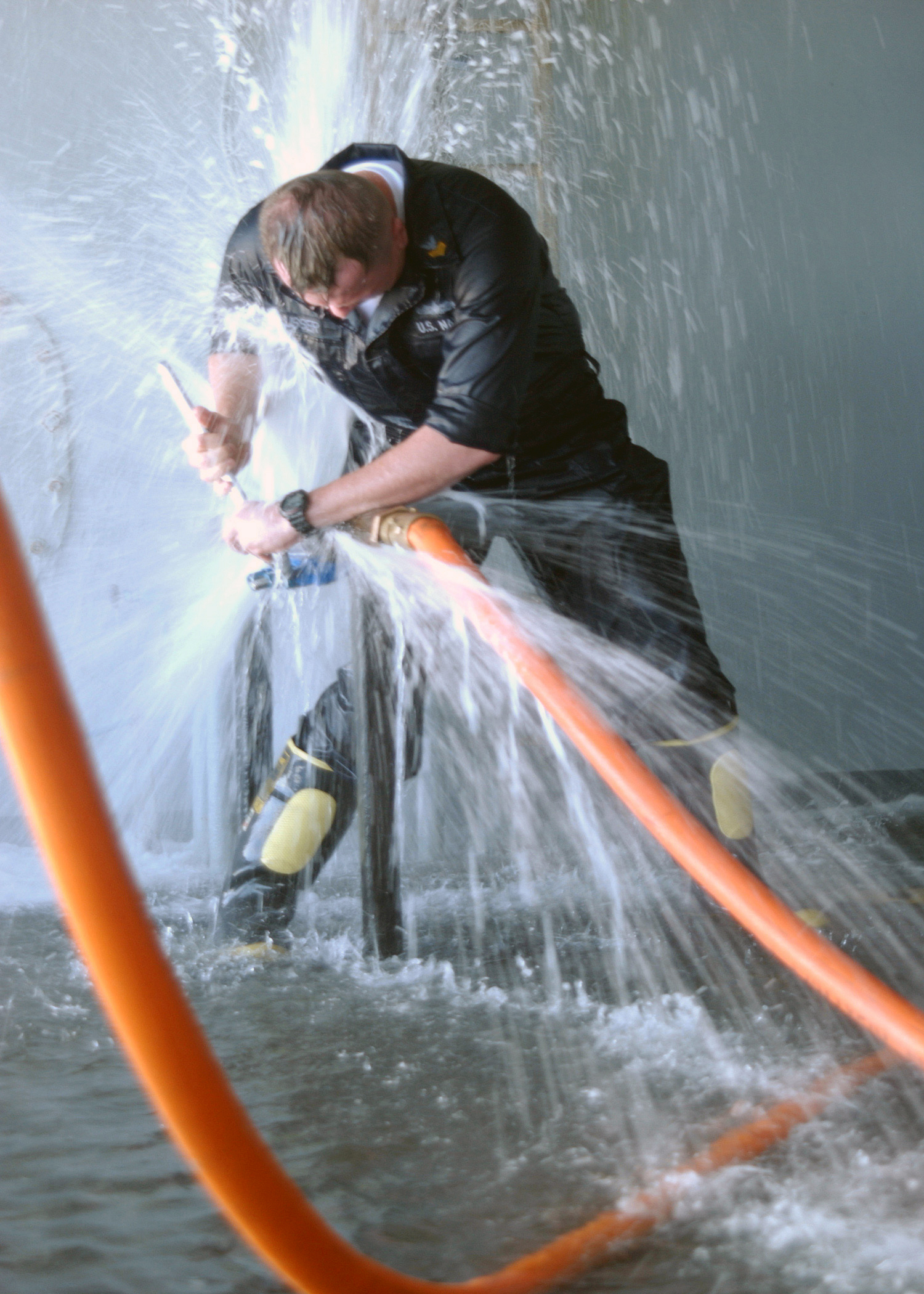
A United States Navy damage controlman practices pipe-patching techniques.

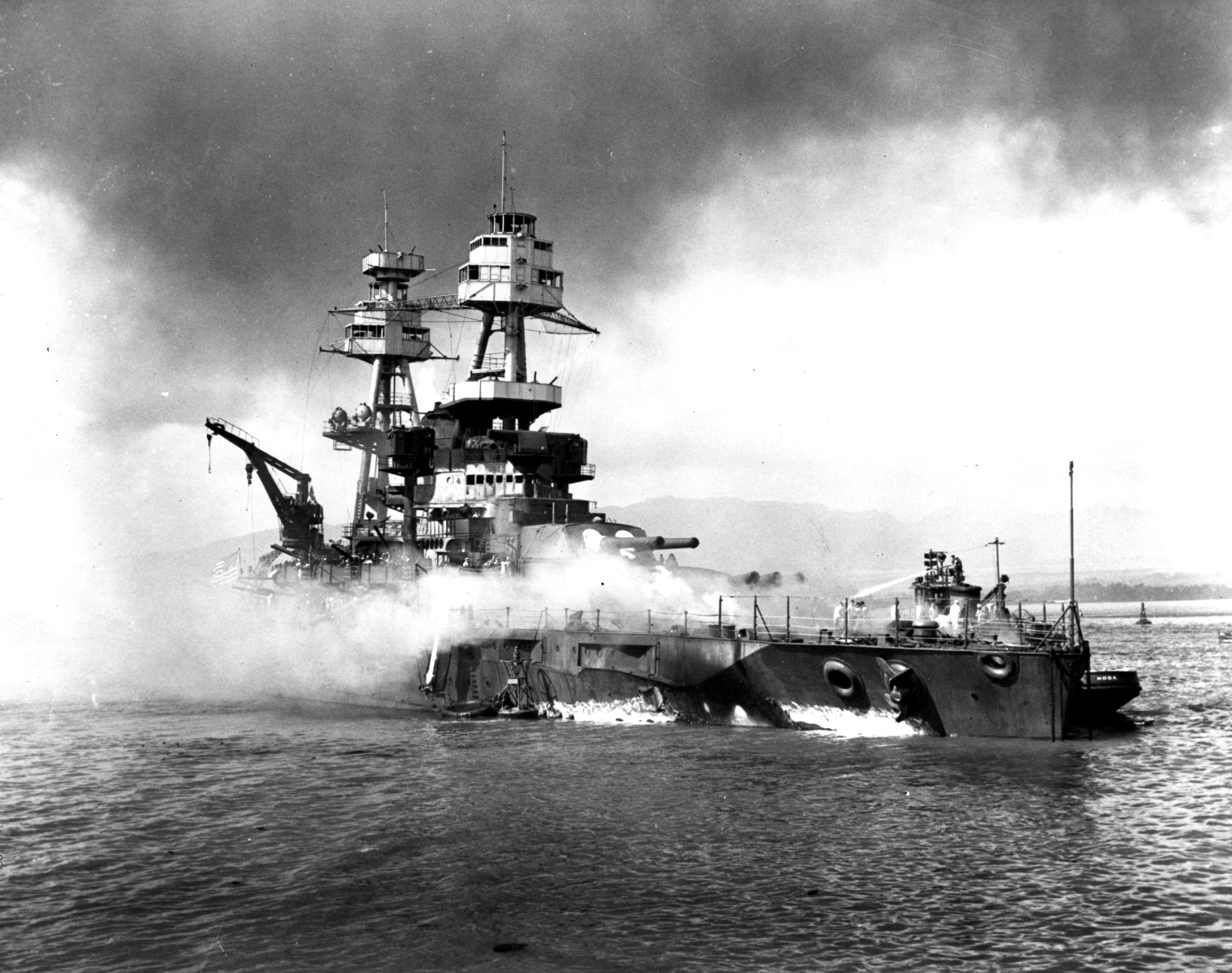
The USS Nevada is shown temporarily beached and burning after being hit by Japanese bombs and torpedoes on December 7, 1941.

In navies and the maritime industry, damage control is the emergency control of situations that may cause the sinking of a watercraft.

Examples are:

- rupture of a pipe or hull especially below the waterline and
- damage from grounding (running aground) or hard berthing against a wharf.
- temporary fixing of bomb or explosive damage.

== Measures used ==
Simple measures may stop flooding, such as:

- locking off the damaged area from other ship's compartments;
- blocking the damaged area by wedging a box around a tear in the ship's hull,
- putting a band of thin sheet steel around a tear in a pipe, bound on by clamps.

More complicated measures may be needed if a repair must take the pressure of the ship moving through the water. For example:

- Thermal lance cutting around the rupture.
- Oxyacetylene welding or electric arc welding of plates over the rupture.
- Quick-drying cement is applied underwater over the rupture.

Damage control training is undertaken by most seafarers, but the engineering staff are most experienced in making lasting repairs.

Damage control is distinct from firefighting. Damage control methods of fighting fire are based on the class of ship and cater to ship specific equipment on board.

== Dangers to vessel ==
In wartime, the main threats to a vessel are flooding, breaking up via structural damage, severe fires, and magazine detonations. A ship will not sink until it has suffered underwater damage.

Collision is an additional source of damage.

Sinking is the ultimate danger to a vessel, but rarely does a vessel sink by total loss of buoyancy. Rather, vessels more frequently sink by capsizing or plunging (sinking at the bow or stern).

During WWII, fires destroyed many US ships during the early part of the war, but advances in firefighting training and techniques reduced losses to fire by the end of the war.

Loss of propulsion, in wartime, renders ships vulnerable to enemy fire because they can no longer evade. This danger is greater to ships with only a single screw and a single engine room.

== Design considerations ==
Naval armour may lessen the need for damage control, or ensure that damage is not severe enough to immediately destroy a vessel. Watertight bulkheads may divide a ship into many small compartments which allow for easier control of flooding.

Ships with torpedo protection require different damage control considerations than those without.

== Notable contemporary examples ==
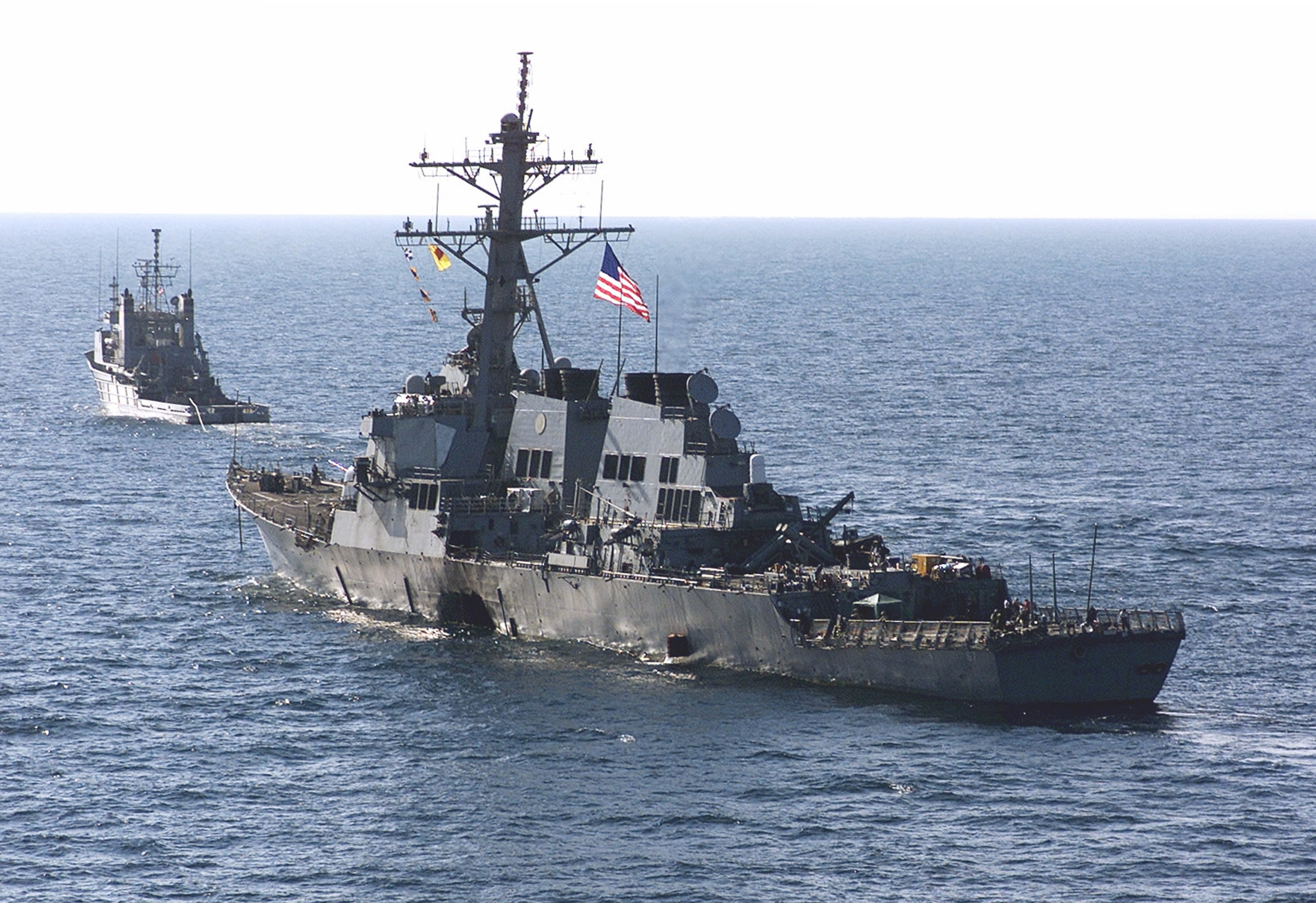
Damage to USS Cole

Particular examples:

- USS Samuel B. Roberts: After an Iranian mine holed the frigate beneath the waterline in 1988, the crew fought fire and flooding that threatened to sink it.
- USS Princeton: After an Iraqi naval mine damaged the cruiser during the 1991 Gulf War, her crew fought fires and sealed cracks in the hull, then repaired electronic systems, bringing the Aegis Combat System back on line within 2 hours.
- USS Cole: immediate measures to stop sinking after the ship was bombed in 2000.
- HMS Nottingham: measures to keep the ship afloat after, on 7 July 2002, the Nottingham ran aground on the submerged but well-charted Wolf Rock near Lord Howe Island.

== See also ==
- Marine salvage – Recovering a ship or cargo after a maritime casualty
- Naval architecture – Engineering discipline of marine vessels
