= Marine firefighting =

Firefighting involving watercraft

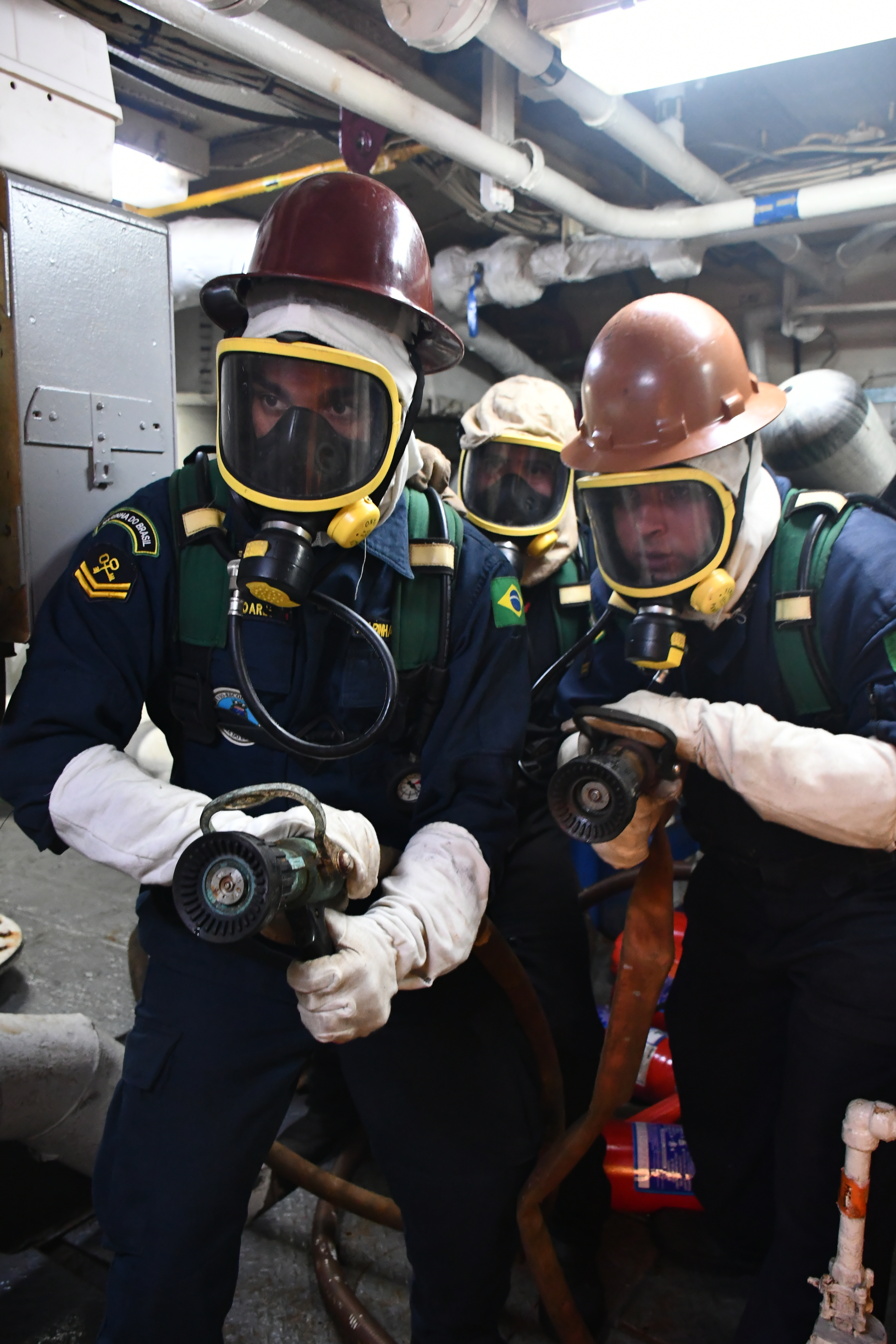
Sailors from the training ship Brasil carry out a marine firefighting drill.

Marine firefighting, also known as Maritime firefighting, is a type of firefighting that involves a fire on a watercraft. It involves actions such as extinguishing the fire, providing medical care, and evacuating the watercraft. A fire that occurs on a watercraft is known as a marine fire. A person who specializes in marine firefighting is known as a marine firefighter. From 2015 to 2024, maritime fires/explosions have directly resulted in the total loss of 109 ships and the death or injury of 1900 people. This figure only accounts for ships over 100 gross tons.

== Differences from land-based firefighting ==
Marine fires when a watercraft is underway (freely moving in a body of water) are significantly more dangerous than typical land-based fires due to a variety of reasons.

- Some firefighting methods widely used to combat land-based fires, notably spraying the fire with water, cannot be used or must be used on a smaller scale in marine firefighting. In the case of spraying water, this is due to the risk of the weight of the water capsizing the watercraft.
- Response times from emergency services to a marine fire are often extremely long, if emergency services are available to respond at all.
- The ability of people to flee a marine fire is often severely restricted, due to the limited size of most watercraft and the surrounding water.
- There is the risk of a watercraft sustaining damage and sinking.
- Many watercraft, especially smaller ones, do not have trained firefighters and do not carry adequate firefighting equipment.

== History ==
Marine firefighting is closely associated with naval warfare. Deliberately setting fire to enemy ships during combat has been noted as far back as 578 BC. Incendiary weapons continued to be used throughout naval engagements. Notably, Greek fire, an incendiary liquid, was employed by the Byzantine empire on several occasions in naval engagements. Greek fire was unable to be extinguished by water but it was soon discovered that the fire could be smothered using sand and dirt. Additionally, several unconfirmed sources claim that Greek fire was able to be extinguished using vinegar or urine, though why vinegar or urine would be an effective countermeasure is unknown.

As large wooden sailing ships became widespread during the Age of Sail, fire continued to be a major issue. Incendiary weapons continued to be used during this period. One example was heated shot, or the practice of heating cannon balls to ignite fires on ships. They were widely used on land forts and coastal batteries but was not commonly practiced aboard ships to avoid accidental fires. In the late 17th century, the British Navy implemented hand cranked pumps on all large ships to aid marine firefighting.

== See also ==
- Fire ship
- Damage control (maritime)
- Fireboat
