= Pasukan Gerakan Khas =

Special operations command of the Royal Malaysia Police

Special Operations Command
- Pasukan Gerakan Khas ڤاسوكن ڬرقن خاص
- Active: 20 October 1997; 28 years ago
- Country: Malaysia
- Agency: Royal Malaysia Police
- Part of: Internal Security and Public Order Department
- Headquarters: Bukit Aman, Kuala Lumpur
- Abbreviation: PGK

Structure
- Officers: Approx. 900+
- Subunits: Detachment A – UTK; Detachment B – VAT 69

Commanders
- Current commander: SAC Dato’ Azizan Abd. Aziz
- Notable commanders: SAC Dato' Meor Chek Hussien Mahayuddin

Notables
- Significant operation(s): Pudu Prison siege; Al-Ma'unah; Operation Astute, Timor Leste; Genting Sempah Incident; Arrest of Mas Selamat Kastari; 2013 Lahad Datu standoff

Pasukan Gerakan Khas (Abbreviation: PGK; 'Special Operations Command — Police SOCOM', Jawi: ڤاسوكن ڬرقن خاص) is a special operations command of the Royal Malaysia Police (RMP).

The PGK has two distinct sub-units; the Special Actions Unit (Malay: Unit Tindakhas — UTK) and the 69 Commando Battalion (Very Able Trooper 69 — VAT 69; Malay: 69 Komando). Operators of UTK and VAT 69 are specially trained to intervene in high-risk events like hostage and barricade situations by hostile forces, especially terrorists and/or criminals. It originally had over 4,000 full-time operators, but its actual size and organisation are classified. Both units commonly function as a high-level national tactical team in extremely sensitive or dangerous situations.

== History ==
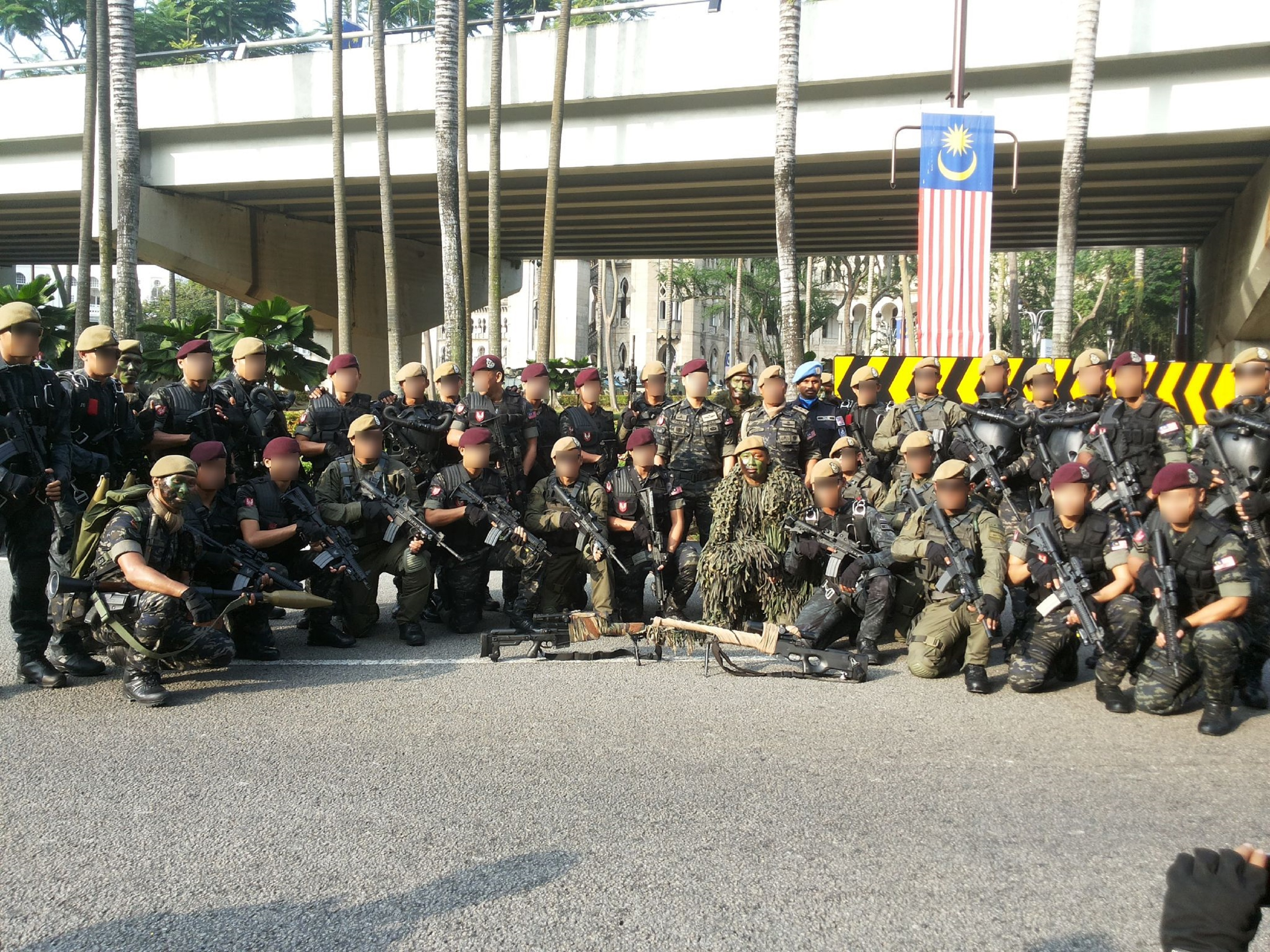
Operators from both detachments under PGK. Operators from UTK wear a maroon beret while the operators from VAT 69 wear a tan beret.

=== Formation of Police SOCOM ===
On 20 October 1997, the RMP reorganised their special operations force, combining VAT 69 and UTK into one special operations command known as Pasukan Gerakan Khas (PGK; 'Special Operations Command — SOCOM'), launched by Prime Minister Mahathir Mohamad and Inspector General of Police Tan Sri Abdul Rahim Mohd Noor.

Although amalgamated into one directorate, they are essentially still two separate entities operating in two distinct operational environments.

==== VAT 69 ====
The 69 Commando Battalion, also known as Very Able Troopers 69 (VAT 69), Task Force, Charlie Force and Special Project Team, is modeled on and trained by the British Special Air Service and New Zealand Special Air Service.

It was founded in 1969 (hence the name – 69) as a small combat unit to counter the tactics and techniques of the communist forces of the Second Malayan Emergency.

Initially established as an elite counter-insurgency force, the role of counter-terrorism was added to the VAT 69 in the 1990s after the Second Malayan Emergency officially ended.

==== UTK ====
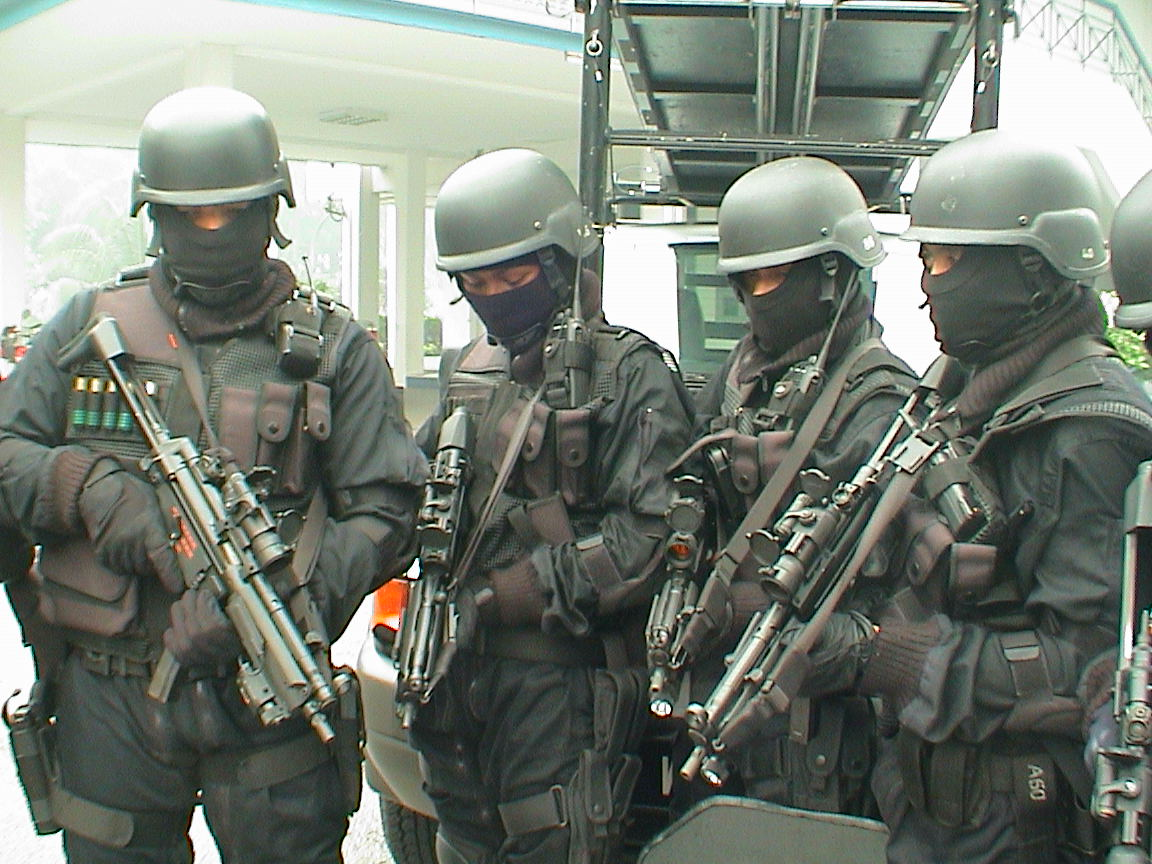
Four UTK operatives on standby. They are armed with MP5-Ns equipped with Aimpoint CompM2 Sight and Insight Technology flashlight.

Unit Tindakhas (Malay: Special Actions Unit), popularly known with its acronym UTK, is a special forces unit of RMP and the oldest and most experienced counter-terrorism unit in Malaysia.

It performs as a high-level national police tactical unit, providing 24 hours of close protection to high ranking government executives and their spouses, and the unit's members also undertake undercover missions.

Founded on 1 January 1975, UTK is the brainchild of then Inspector-General of Police Tun Hanif Omar. UTK were trained by the 22nd SAS for urban warfare on its early establishment.

However, this unit does not only perform close-quarter combat and close-protection only, but they also have the capability to perform underwater mission, airborne mission, and sometimes jungle operation since 1975 to encounter various types of terrorism.

=== National Special Operations Force ===
In 2016, the main counter-terrorism operators in Malaysia, including PGK, were combined into one special operations task force called the National Special Operations Force.

== Functions ==
PGK roles are believed to include:

- Intelligence collection in deep reconnaissance missions and warfare.
- Special operations to support the RMP Special Branch in combating subversive organisations or terrorist activities.
- Counter-terrorism operations inside Malaysian territory in conjunction with the armed forces.
- Law enforcement operations in dealing with armed criminals inside Malaysian territory.
- Counter-terrorism operations outside Malaysian territory, including Operation Astute in Timor Leste.
- Search and rescue operations inside or outside Malaysian territory, such as aid operations in the aftermath of the 2004 Indian Ocean earthquake and tsunami in Aceh, Indonesia.
- Protection of senior Malaysian dignitaries, ministers and VIPs.
- Assist other RMP Special Forces Equivalent Units (e.g. UNGERIN and Tiger Platoon) in training and tactics.

== Organisation ==
Previously separate entities, both VAT 69 and the UTK were amalgamated into the PGK Command on 20 October 1997, when it was launched by the fifth Inspector General of Police, Tan Sri Rahim Noor.

However, VAT 69 and the UTK are still operated as separate units. The UTK is now officially known as Pasukan Gerakan Khas Detachment A and VAT 69 has been deputised to Pasukan Gerakan Khas Detachment B.

Based at the Royal Malaysia Police Headquarters in Bukit Aman, Kuala Lumpur, the PGK is under the direct command of the RMP's Internal Security and Public Order (Malay: Keselamatan Dalam Negeri dan Ketenteraman Awam) Director.

The unit commander holds the rank of Senior Assistant Commissioner (SAC) and is the deputy director of the Internal Security and Public Order (Special Operations Command).

With the growing threat of terrorism since the 9/11 attacks, this unit has increasingly adapted itself to conduct counter-terrorism duties. With the aim of creating teams that are capable of dealing with a broad range of operations (especially counter-terrorism), the PGK small patrol team consist of six to ten operatives led by officers ranked from Police Inspector to Superintendent of Police with different expertise such as assault units, EOD experts, communications experts, snipers and field medics. The PGK has also forged closer relations with the special forces units of the Malaysian Armed Forces, including the elite 10th Parachute Brigade, 21 Grup Gerak Khas, PASKAL and PASKAU, so as to enable them to enforce security within Malaysia's borders more effectively.

== Roles ==
List of PGK detachments and their Specialties
Detachment	Unit Name	Insignia	Speciality	Notes
A	Special Actions Unit Unit Tindakhas		Counter-terrorist and VIP close protection	UTK has a variety of roles in addition to helping other branch's duties in large and serious cases. The UTK is tasked in four main roles which is: 1. Fighting urban guerrillas, terrorist groups, groups of subversive and extremist organizations.; 2. Assist the Criminal Investigation Department (CID) in major criminal cases.; 3. Conducting safety protection to local VIPs and foreign visitors if may be deemed necessary.; 4. Other responsibilities as directed by the Inspector-General of Police and the Deputy Inspector-General of Police.; The UTK tactics and organisation are primarily influenced by the German GSG 9 and American Special Activities Division but with a difference; UTK operatives operate mostly in plain-clothes and also perform undercover missions. With 410 members (as of November 2017), the UTK is deployed in cases of hostage taking, kidnapping, terrorism and extortion. The group may also be used to secure locations, neutralise targets, track down fugitives and sometimes conduct sniper operations and escorting and protecting top leaders and VVIPs. UTK operators are trained for urban operations, airborne operations and underwater operations.
B	69 Commando Battalion		Multi-spectrum operations	VAT 69 commando operatives are jungle warfare specialists given VAT 69's origins as a force established to fight the communist threats in 1969 and the insurgency years. Originally trained by the British and New Zealand SAS, VAT 69 commandos conduct land, sea and air special operations techniques, with specialties in jungle warfare and deep reconnaissance missions. They execute special operations in support of the Police Special Branch fight against subversive organisations and terrorist activities, such as offensive operations using special weapons and tactics, hostage rescue, counter-insurgency, counter-terrorism, and close protection. It can also be deployed to support the Malaysian Armed Forces in special circumstances. There are four infantry squadrons in VAT 69 Commando with its own logistic unit, totaling around 500 members. The VAT 69 consists of four main combat units: Counter Insurgency Warfare (CIW) Unit; Counter Terrorist Team (CTT); Airborne Team; Combat Diving Unit

Both VAT 69's and UTK's snipers, technicians and explosive expertise regularly cross-train with foreign special forces units, including the Special Air Service Regiments of Australia, New Zealand and the United Kingdom, the Royal Thai Border Patrol Police, the French GIGN, the German GSG 9, and a number of US services including the US Navy SEALs, Federal Bureau of Investigation (FBI), Special Weapons and Tactics (SWAT) and others. UTK members wear maroon berets while VAT 69 Commando members wear the sand coloured beret given to them by their founding trainers, the SAS.

On 14 November 2006, for the first time in the history of PGK, the maroon and sand coloured berets were honoured as 'Royal Berets' by Yang Dipertuan Agong Tuanku Syed Sirajuddin Syed Putera Jamalullail, the then King of Malaysia.

== Area of responsibility ==
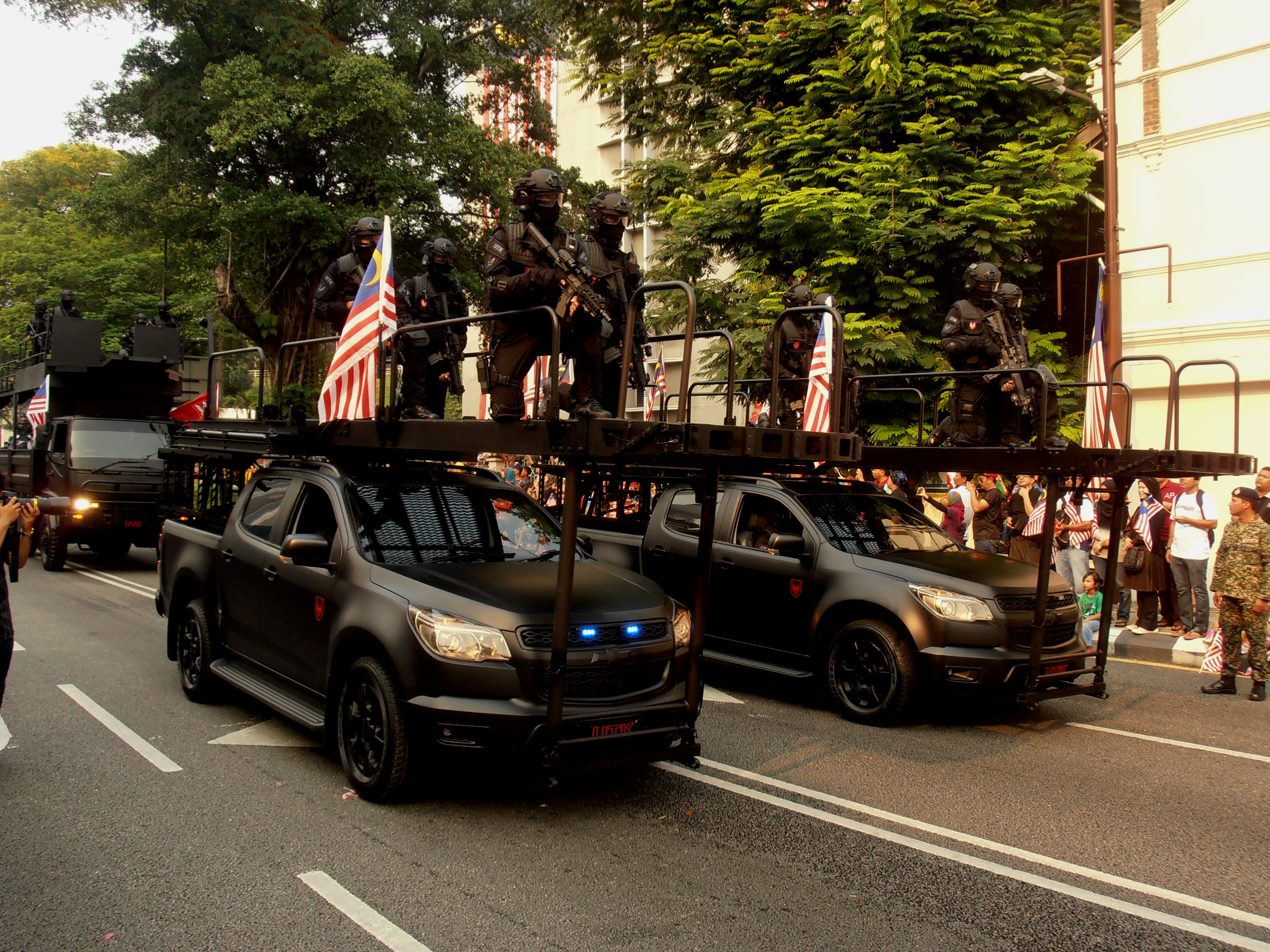
Officers from the Special Actions Unit, Royal Malaysia Police, on the Kia Rapid Intervention Vehicle at the Sultan Abdul Samad Street for the 2015 National Day Parade in Kuala Lumpur. They dons the new Marine Ops Core tactical helmets and new Ferfrans SOAR carbines.

The PGK divides areas of responsibility of both PGK detachments by states which are:

Detachment A (UTK)	Detachment B (VAT 69)
Johor	Pahang
Kuala Lumpur	Penang
Malacca	Perak
Negeri Sembilan	Perlis
Putrajaya	Kedah
Selangor	Kelantan
	Terengganu

For Sabah and Sarawak, it is under the responsibility of General Operations Force (GOF) Special Forces Equivalent Unit; Tiger Platoon from GOF Sabah Brigade and GOF Sarawak Brigade. The Tiger Platoons are supported by both PGK detachments.

== Recruitment, selection and training ==
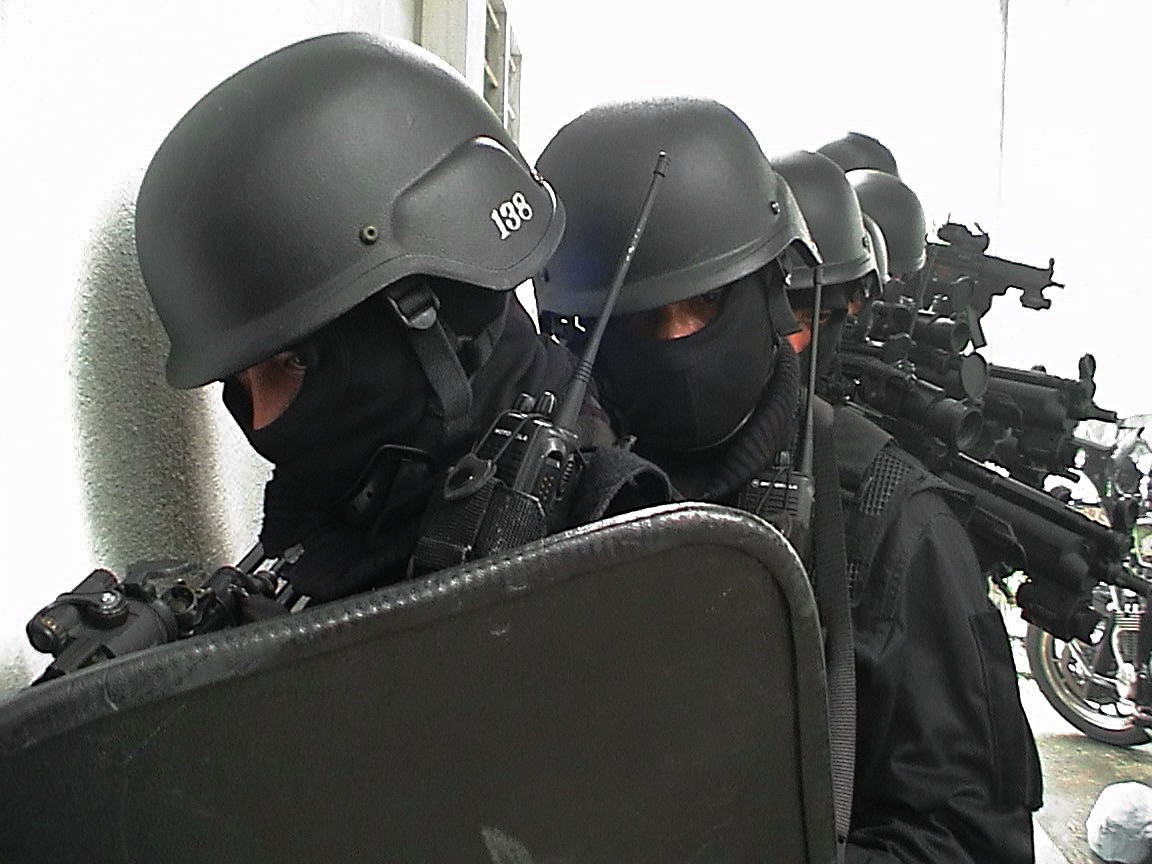
Several UTK operatives moving during a close quarters combat drill at the killing house. The first operative is equipped with a tactical shield.

Both VAT 69 and UTK has their own recruitment and selection program. All members of the RMP with two years of service can apply to the unit selections.

The PGK is known to conduct joint training exercises and participate in exchange programs with Commonwealth special units such as the Australian SAS, British SAS, New Zealand SAS and Singapore Special Tactics and Rescue. The PGK routinely trains with neighbouring country tactical teams such as the Indonesian Mobile Brigade and Thailand Border Patrol Police. Occasionally, the PGK trains with FBI Hostage Rescue Team, French GIGN and RAID, German GSG 9, Italian NOCS, Spanish G.E.O, US Delta Force, US Green Berets, US Army Special Operations Command Pacific Unit (SOCPAC), Russian Special Rapid Response Unit and other international units.

On 10 December 2003, the then Inspector General of Police, Tan Sri Mohd Bakri Haji Omar, launched the training programme between the US SOCPAC and the 69th PGK at the General Operations Force Training Center in Ulu Kinta, Perak. The team of SOCPAC were to conduct a joint exercise with the PGK, under the code-name "Advance Vector Balance Mint" for a duration of 2 weeks.

== Equipment ==
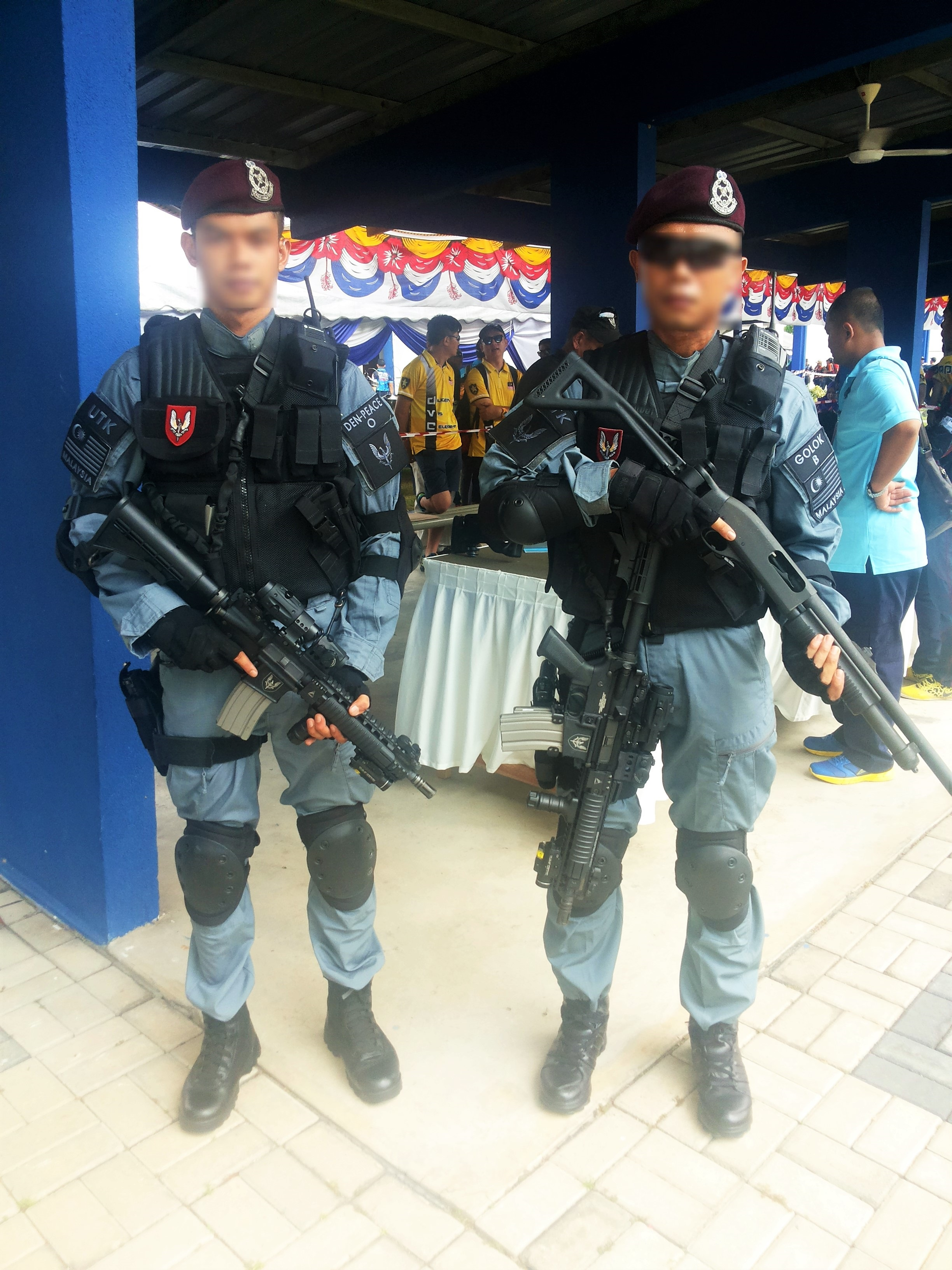
UTK operators with new Battle Dress Uniforms on standby at the Centre Brigade of General Operations Force Base, Cheras, Kuala Lumpur. They are armed with American-made FERFRANS SOAR compact carbines and the Remington M870 Police Magnum.

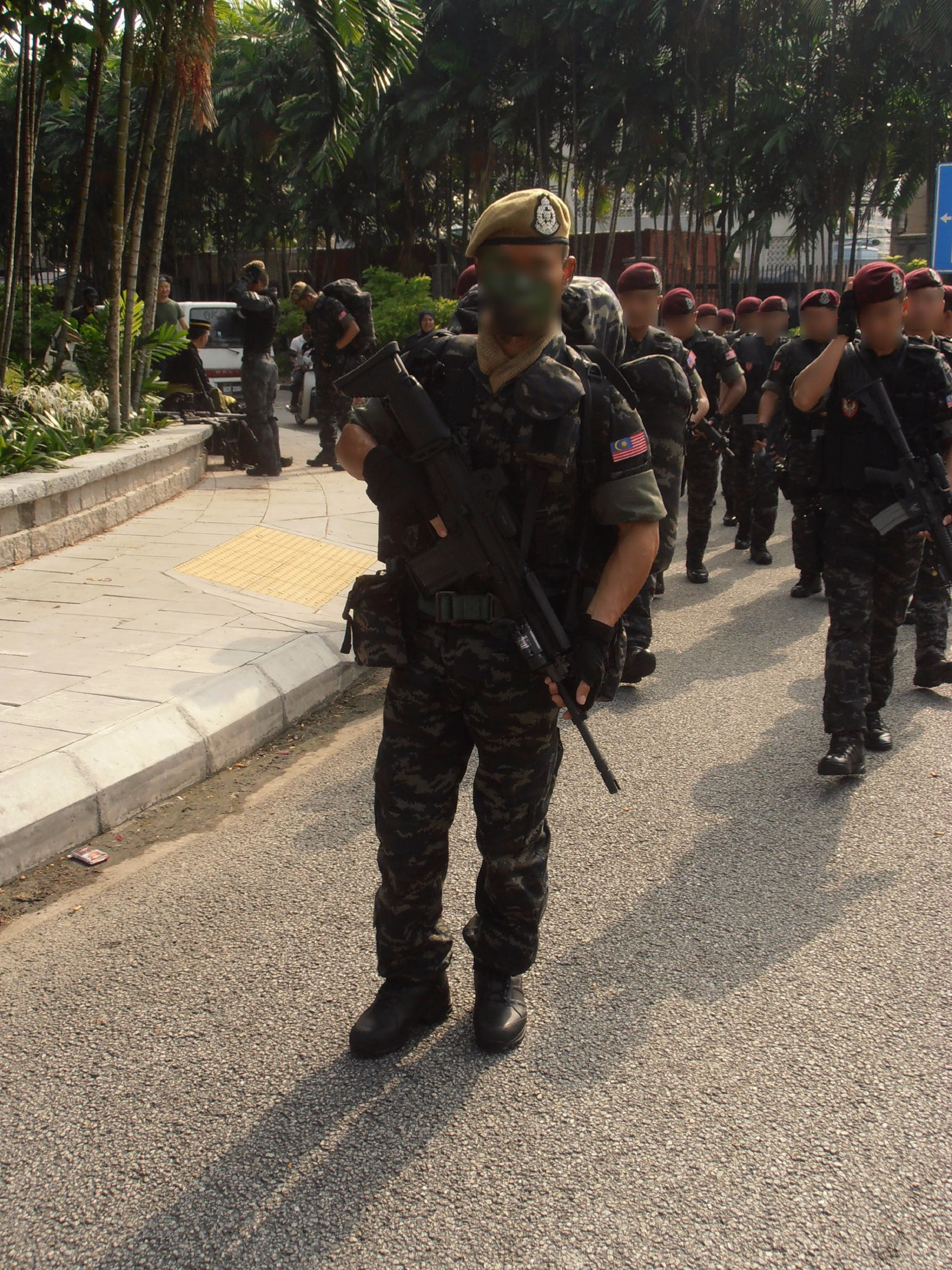
A 69 Commando operative with digital BDU on standby during the 60th Merdeka Day at Merdeka Square, Kuala Lumpur. He is armed with a Belgian-made FN SCAR-H battle rifle fitted with an EOTech sight.

PGK teams use equipment designed for a variety of specialist situations.

The particular pieces of equipment vary from unit to unit, but there are some consistent trends in what they wear and use.

Much of their equipment is indistinguishable from that supplied to the military, not least because much of it is military surplus.

=== Weapons ===
==== Firearms ====
Name	Origin	Type	Variants
Colt 1911A1	United States	Semi-automatic pistol	
STI Grandmaster	United States	Semi-automatic pistol	
STI Tactical-5.0	United States	Semi-automatic pistol	
Glock	Austria	Semi-automatic pistol	17, 18, 26, 34
Heckler & Koch USP	Germany	Semi-automatic pistol	
Heckler & Koch Mk23 Mod 0	Germany	Semi-automatic pistol	
SIG Sauer SP2022	Switzerland	Semi-automatic pistol	
Benelli M3 Super 90	Italy	Shotgun	
Franchi SPAS-12	Italy	Shotgun	
Remington 870	United States	Shotgun	Police Magnum
Remington 1100	United States	Shotgun	
CZ Scorpion Evo 3	Czech Republic	Submachine gun	
Heckler & Koch MP5	Germany	Submachine gun	A5, N, K-A4, SD6
Heckler & Koch UMP	Germany	Submachine gun	
Heckler & Koch MP7	Germany	Personal defense weapon	A1
Colt M4A1	United States	Carbine	
Colt APC	United States	Carbine	
Heckler & Koch HK416	Germany	Carbine	D10RS, D14.5RS
Heckler & Koch G36C	Germany	Carbine	
Steyr AUG	Austria	Carbine	A3
Special Operations Assault Rifle	United StatesPhilippines	Carbine	
FN SCAR-H	Belgium	Battle rifle	
Accuracy International PM	United Kingdom	Sniper rifle	
Accuracy International AX338	United Kingdom	Sniper rifle	
Accuracy International AWSM	United Kingdom	Sniper rifle	
HK PSG-1A1	Germany	Sniper rifle	
Barrett M82	United States	Sniper rifle	
Remington 700P	United States	Sniper rifle	
M60 machine gun	United States	Machine gun	
M79 grenade launcher	United States	Grenade launcher	
M203 grenade launcher	United States	Grenade launcher	

==== Less lethal weapons ====
Name	Origin	Type
Bean bag rounds	United States	Projectile
M84 stun grenade	United States	Stun grenade
Pepper spray	United States	Lachrymator
Pepper-spray projectile	United States	Projectile
Taser X26	United States	Electroshock weapon

==== Notes ====
- The Bean Bag shell is typically fired from a shotgun, and is used by police and military forces mainly in the United States to disperse riots when it is not able to be controlled with tear gas. When fired, the bean bag (or BB) made from rubber and plastic is expelled at around 70–90 meters/second; it spreads out in flight and distributes its impact over about 6 centimetres² of the target. It is designed to deliver a blow that will cause minimum long-term trauma and no penetration, but will result in a muscle spasm or other reaction to briefly render a violent suspect immobile.

=== Tactical vehicles ===
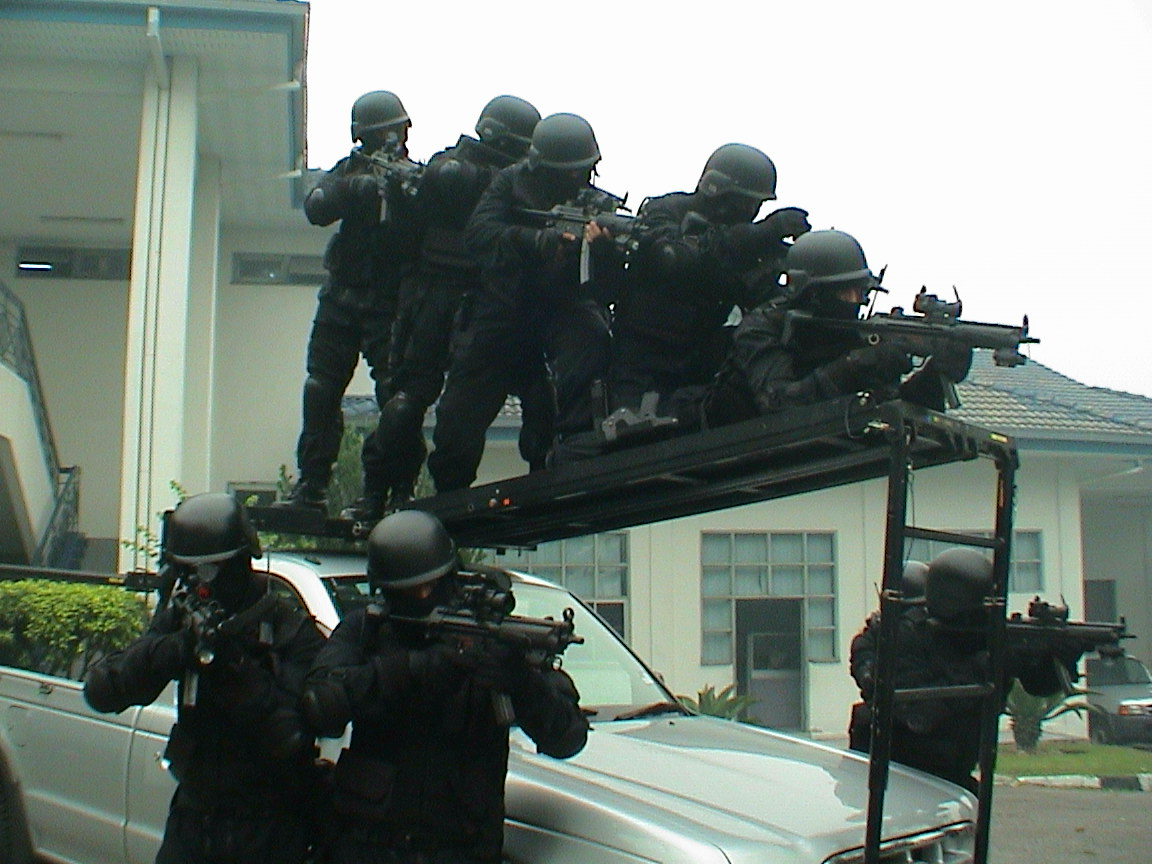
UTK operators using a Ford Explorer Sport Trac type as a Rapid Intervention Vehicle for vehicular assault.

PGK employs a number of specialised vehicles to accomplish its missions. These include the Streit Typhoon, IAG Jaws, Commando V-150D and the GKN Sankey AT105 armoured personnel carriers equipped with M60s as assault vehicles in urban and jungle terrain as well as modified police MPV (Mobile Patrol Vehicles), vans, trucks, 4WD, pick-ups and buses for use as tactical vehicles. PGK also employs RHIB assault boats, jet-skis and Marine Subskimmers (DPV) in maritime missions and amphibious insertions.

For its airborne operations, PGK is aided with the C-130 Hercules from the Royal Malaysian Air Force, and Cessna 206G, Cessna 208 Caravan 1 and Pilatus Porter PC-6 aircraft as well as the E-Squirrel AS-355 F2/AS-355N helicopter from the RMP Air Wing Unit.

=== Developments and acquisitions ===
On 25 October 2007, a state-of-the-art shooting house for the VAT 69 Commando battalion was opened. It was funded by the US Joint Interagency Task Force West and cost RM 2 million.

== List of commanders ==
Listed below are the unit commanders past & present.

List of Pasukan Gerakan Khas commander
Name	Year	Remark
SUPT G/640 M. Shanmugam	1975 – 1976	First commanding officer of the PGK
SUPT G/3158 Ramli Abd Kadir	1976 – 1978	Replaced Supt. Shanmugam
ACP G/2827 Syed Mohd Mumtaz Wafa Syed Subli Wafa	1978 – 1983	-
ACP G/3740 A Navaratnam	1983 – 1986	First commanding officer and head of VAT 69
DSP G/5439 Meor Chek Hussein Mahayuddin	1986 – 1987	Assistant commanding officer of the PGK
ACP G/3421 Mohd Yusof Harun	1987 – 1990	-
ACP G/3432 Haji Idris Haji Wahid	1990 – 1993	-
SAC I G/5439 Dato' Meor Chek Hussien Mahayuddin	1993 – 2000	1997 Merged VAT 69 and UTK to Pasukan Gerakan Khas
SAC II G/5096 Dato' Mohd Anuar Mohd Zain	2000 – 2002	-
SAC II Roslan Mohd Yassin	2002 – 2004	PGK Commander from 2002 and transferred to Pahang state as the Officer Chief of Police Contingent in 2004
SAC II Mohd Rani Abd Rashid	2004 – 2006	From Deputy Director of Internal and Public Security in Royal Malaysian Police
SAC II Muhammad Sabtu Osman	2006 – 2008	Transferred to Kuala Lumpur as Kuala Lumpur Police Chief
SAC I Dato' Muhammad Fuad Abu Zarin	2008 – 2015	Replaced SAC II Muhammad Sabtu Osman
SAC Dato' Azizan Abd. Aziz	2015 – Present	Replaced SAC I Dato' Muhammad Fuad Abu Zarin

== Personnel killed in the line of duty ==
Rank	Name	Unit	Year of death	Circumstances
ASP G/3427 ("Task Force")	Mohd Zabri Abdul Hamid SP	VAT 69	1975	Sustained fatal injuries from stepping onto a booby-trap while intercepting and hunting down communist guerillas who were responsible for the murder of four Extra Police Constable at Grik, Perak.
PC 67574 ("Task Force")	Zainuddin Hassan	VAT 69	1984	Killed by a communist sniper while assisting a Police Field Force trapped in an ambush by communist guerillas at Ulu Kinta jungle, Perak
Cpl	Ismail Ibrahim	VAT 69	2000	Parachuting accident during basic training course at PGK B Training Facility, Ulu Kinta, Perak
Cpl 110992	Idrus Johar	VAT 69	2000	Parachuting accident during basic training course at PGK B Training Facility, Ulu Kinta, Perak
Insp G/17992	Zulkifli Bin Mamat	VAT 69	2013	Killed during an ambush during the 2013 Lahad Datu standoff in Lahad Datu, Sabah.
Cpl 113088	Sabaruddin Bin Daud	VAT 69	2013	Killed during an ambush during the 2013 Lahad Datu standoff in Lahad Datu, Sabah.
Cpl 148953	Mohd Razkan Seran	UTK	2015	Killed in a helicopter crash in a jungle along Jalan Sungai Lalang in Kampung Pasir Baru, Semenyih, Kajang, while escorting Member of Parliament for Rompin, Tan Sri Jamaluddin Jarjis, from Pahang to Subang.

== Missions ==
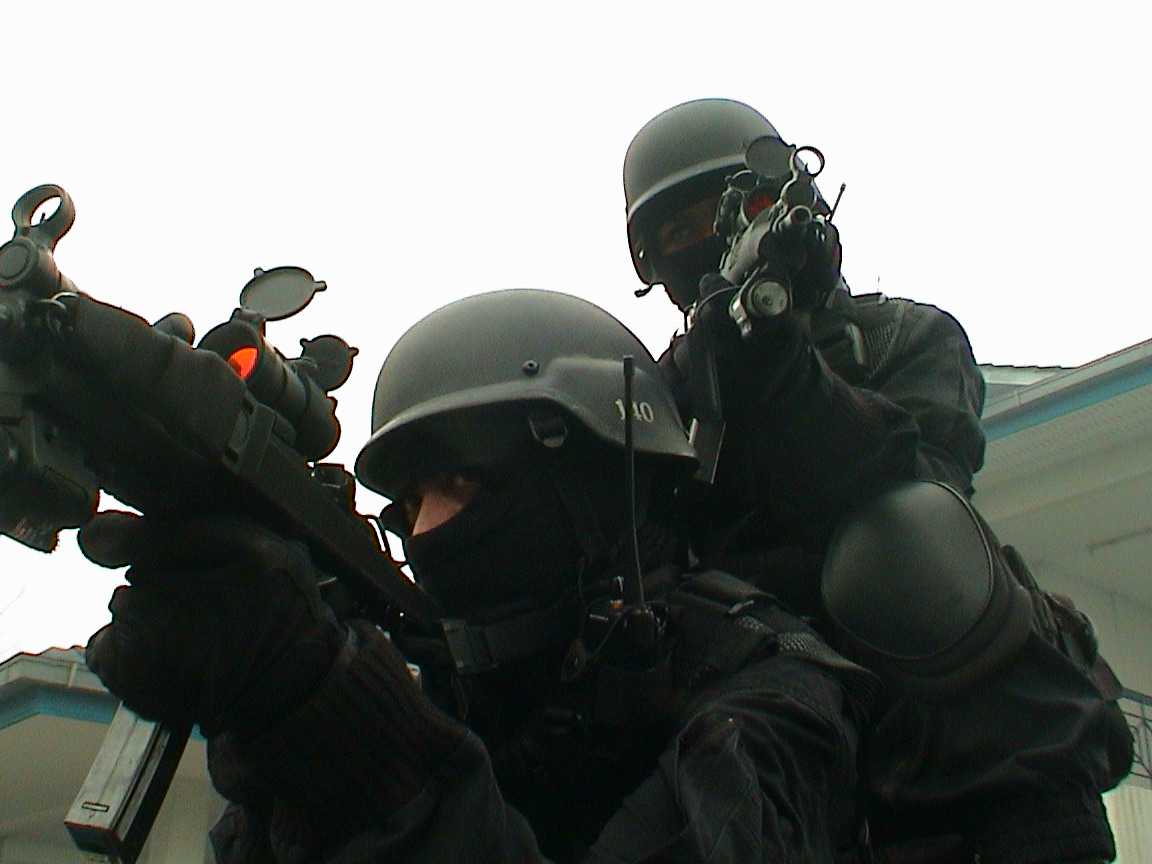
Two operatives of UTK including one female operator armed with MP5-N sub-machine guns during the CQC drill.

=== Operations Dawn ===
Its first counter-terrorism mission, one of the most well-known and which established the unit's reputation as an elite unit, was an operation known as "Operasi Subuh"/"Operasi Khas 304" ('Operations Dawn/Special Operation 304'). It was carried out on 3 July 2000 against Al-Ma'unah militants who had stolen 97 M16 rifles, 2 Steyr AUG rifles, 4 general purpose machine guns (GPMG), 6 light machine guns, 5 M203 grenade launchers, 26 bayonet daggers and thousands of ammunition rounds from 2 control posts of the Rejimen Askar Wataniah ('Territorial Army Regiment') camp in Kuala Rui, Perak. The militants also took two police officers, one army special forces soldier and one villager as hostages and planned to launch attacks against the government.

In the dawn of 5 July 2000, police and military units created a distraction, while members of the PGK, accompanied by the 22nd Commando Regiment (22 Cdo) of Grup Gerak Khas led by Malaysian Army senior officer Lieutenant general (R) Zaini Mohamad Said and PGK 69 Commando leader ASP Abd Razak Mohd Yusof were sent to Sauk, Perak to negotiate with the Al-Ma'unah leader, Mohamed Amin Mohamed Razali.

Amin, along with his comrades, were persuaded to drop their weapons and surrender to the security forces. Although most of the group initially surrendered, negotiations eventually broke down and a gunfight ensued. Two of the four hostages were killed before the group finally surrendered. The security forces suffered two casualties: police Special Branch officer, Detective Corporal R. Sanghadevan and Trooper Matthew anak Medan from 22 Cdo, who were tortured before they were killed and was buried by the other two hostages, Sergeant (R) Mohd Shah Ahmad and civilian Jaafar Puteh, in the jungle before they were both rescued by security forces. Abdul Halim Ali @ Ahmad, a member of the militant group, was shot dead in the gunfight and five others were injured, including two seriously injured. The other twenty-two were taken into police custody. Mohamed Amin, Zahit Muslim, Jemari Jusoh and Jamaludin Darus were later sentenced to death and the other sixteen were sentenced to life imprisonment. Ten more militants were sentenced to ten years in prison by the High Court of Malaysia for war preparations against the Yang di-Pertuan Agong.

=== Publicly known missions ===
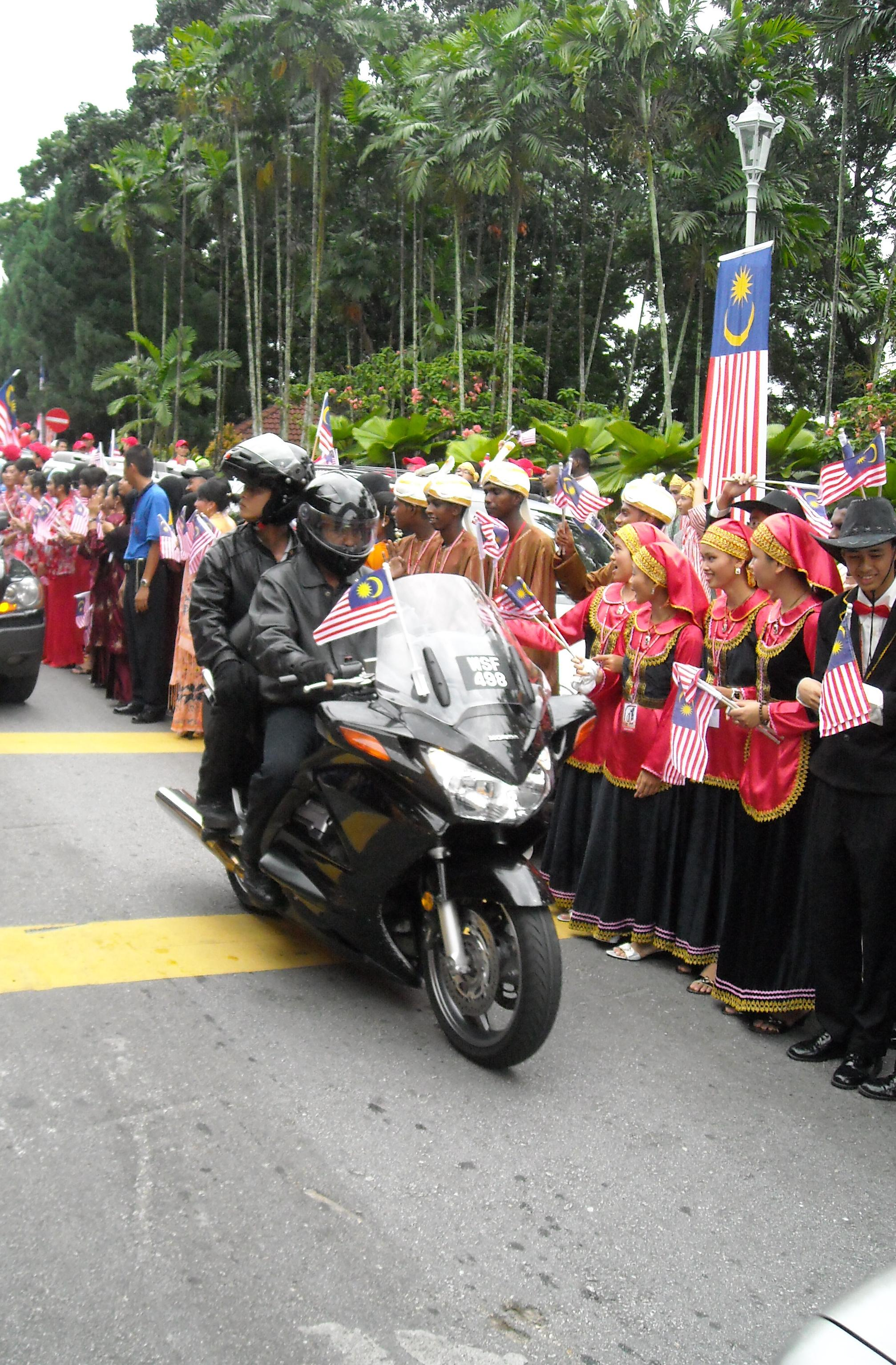
UTK officers riding the Honda ST1300 escorted the VVIP vehicles out to the exit gate of Parliament Square after the 52nd Independence Day Parade on 31 August 2009.

- 1970s: 69 Commandos led by ASP Zabri Abd Hamid together with Indonesian Army KOSTRAD combated the PARAKU in Kalimantan jungles.
- October 1985: The Special Actions Unit (UTK) was involved in the Pudu Prison siege.
- 29 June 1993: UTK stormed a hiding place of P. Kalimuthu, a gangster also known as Bentong Kali, at Medan Damansara, Selangor. In the shoot-out with the police, Kalimuthu was killed.
- 1994: Rizal Aleh and his father, part of one of the Philippine MNLF organisations, escaped from the Philippines and hid in a village of Sabah where he started piracy activities. 69 Commandos led by DSP Mohd Noor Razak conducted an operation named Ops Bamboo II to infiltrate his organisation. In a struggle, Mohd Noor was shot by Rizal in the leg. Rizal and his father were captured and sentenced by the National Court after pleading guilty for his criminal activities in Sabah. Later, both Rizal and his father were extradited to the Philippines.
- 1998: The PGK and the Grup Gerak Khas were deployed to provide security and were on standby for hostage rescue, close protection and counter-terrorism duties during the 1998 Commonwealth Games held at National Stadium, Bukit Jalil, Kuala Lumpur on 11 to 21 September 1998.
- 20 September 1998: In the twilight hours, by orders from the then Prime Minister to the Inspector General of Police, Tan Sri Rahim Noor, 69 Commando operatives led by Inspector Mazlan arrested the ex-Deputy Prime Minister Dato' Sri Anwar Ibrahim in his home 18 days after his ejection from the Cabinet, for inciting anti-Mahathir reforms in Kuala Lumpur. He was initially arrested under the Internal Security Act and was subsequently charged with, and convicted of, corruption and sodomy. Six years later in 2004, when he was serving his jail sentence for sodomy after completing his sentence for corruption, he was released when his sodomy conviction was overturned by the Federal Court.
- 18 January 2000: The PGK was involved in an operation to arrest the Gang Steyr, an armed criminal group led by an ex-special forces soldier named Mohd Hizan Jaafar, along with five men after they robbed a bank in Sri Serdang Road, Selangor. Mohd Hizan and one other were killed in Majidee Malay Village, with two more killed in Kempas Toll Plaza, Johor Bahru, after a shootout with local police. The operation recovered 4 Steyr AUG rifles, one Smith & Wesson .22 handgun, one Remington shotgun, 85 rounds of 5.56 mm ammunition, three rounds of .22 ammunition, a few bullet shells and RM 291,000. The police also launched an operation to hunt two other members of the gang.
- 2001: Arrested two Jemaah Islamiyah (JI) suspects in the list of the Australian Department of Foreign Affairs and Trade, Yazid Sufaat and Suhaimi Mokhtar. The two suspects were detained at Kamunting Detention Center under the Internal Security Act 1960 related to involvement with the activities of JI and al-Qaeda in conducting the September 11 attacks and Bali bombings.
- 2002: Arrested six Jemaah Islamiyah suspect terrorists, Dr Abdullah Daud, Shamsuddin Sulaiman, Mat Shah Mohd Satray, Abdul Murad Sudin, Zaini Zakaria and Zainun Rashid.
- 12 September 2002: Ahmad Mohd Arshad, also known as Mat Komando, 37, the leader of Gang 13, then No. 1 on the Malaysian Most-Wanted-Criminal list for 52 armed robberies involving about RM 2.5 million, armed assault, and illegal possession of firearms (among others), was known to be hiding in Kampung Hujung Keton, a village in the state of Kedah on the west coast of the Malay Peninsula. Armed with intelligence gathered from surveillance and villagers, ten police officers from 69 Commando anti-terror police, supported by the GOF paramilitary police, cordoned off the area and stormed a hut in the village around 6.30 am. In the ensuing shoot-out, Mat Komando was shot in the head and left ribs and killed. The police seized a Colt .45 pistol with three rounds of ammunition, an S&W Model 617 .22 revolver with two rounds of ammunition, and two bullet shells from the deceased. The then Malaysian Inspector General of Police, Tan Sri Norian Mai (Retired), said that Mat Komando was the fourth member of the Gang 13 members to be killed in shoot-outs against police while the remaining nine members had been arrested.

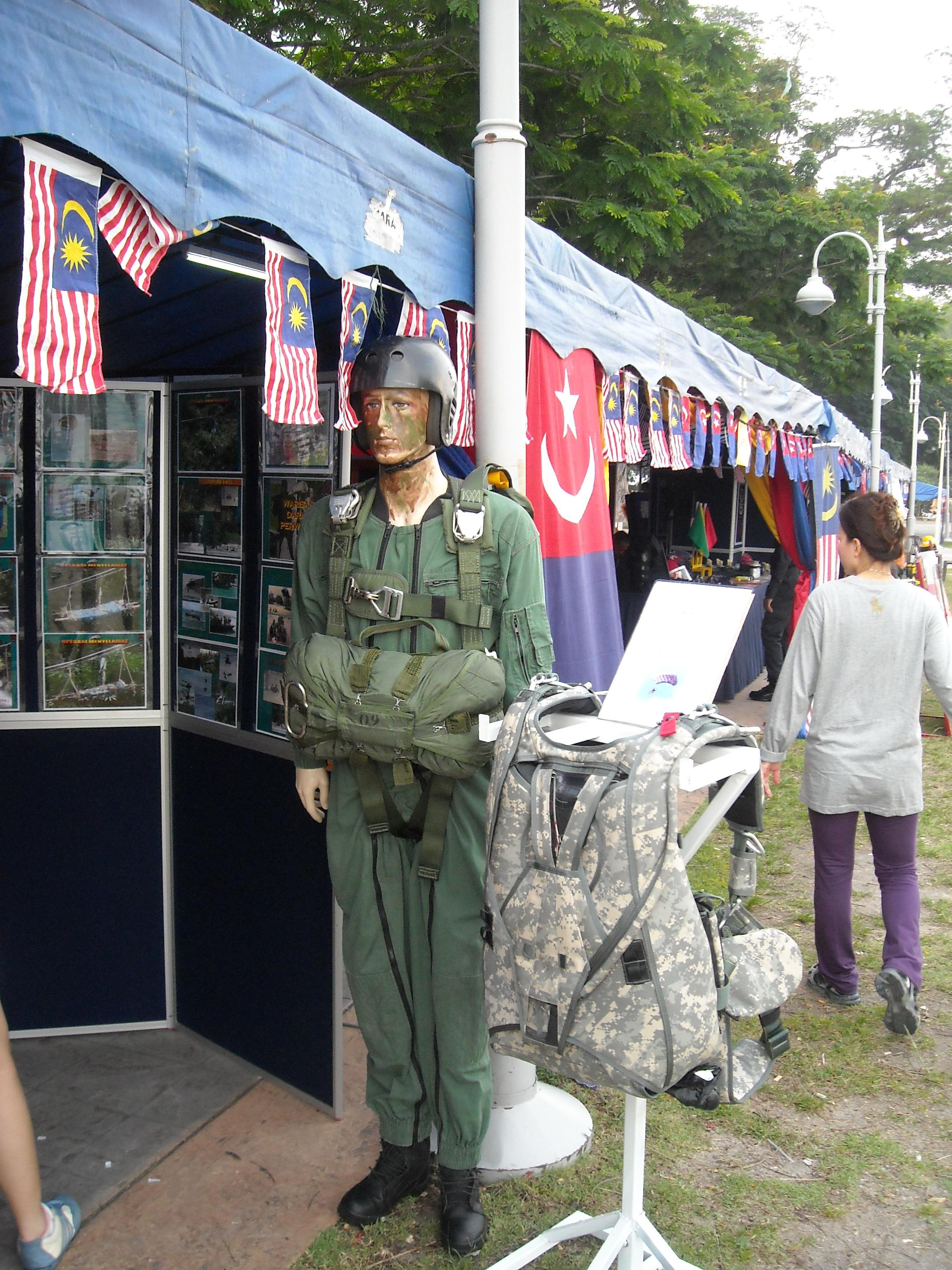
The model of 69 Commando PGK with the HALO/HAHO equipment.

- 27 September 2002: Hunted down Gang M16, the then Most-Wanted-Criminals of Malaysia, for an armed robbery at the Bank of Tokyo in 1985 and sixteen other armed robberies in jewellery shops and pawn shops, amounting to RM 21.28 million in total. It was reported that all the members of this group were Chinese and the mastermind of this group was one Elvis Keh Jiang Long, also known as Ah Po, an ex-Singaporean National Service personnel in the Singaporean Army, was an expert in various firearms and was responsible for training the group for the robberies. During the gun-fighting with the UTK in Batu 5, Jalan Seremban-Mantin, near the Galla Recreational Park, Mantin, Negeri Sembilan, two of the Gang M16 members, identified as Sunny Chai @ Sum Wing Chang and his right-hand man, known as Hew Yau, were shot dead. Another gang member, Chang Kew Yin, managed to escape. One UTK officer was wounded. Security forces recovered an M16 rifle with two rounds of ammunition, a Colt semi-automatic handgun with sixteen rounds of ammunition, a Smith & Wesson revolver and three ski-masks from the suspects' vehicles. On 28 December at 2 am, Chang was gunned down in a shootout at Jalan Keris, Taman Sri Tebrau, Johor Bahru and security forces recovered a Chinese-made Norinco pistol with three rounds of ammunition. Federal CID Director, Datuk Salleh Mat Som (late), said the police are hunting for the Gang M16 members who were still at large, including sending their officers to Singapore and Thailand to track Keh down, and also requested the assistance of the Australian police to locate another gang member, Hew Soon Loong @ Hong Kong Chai, who was believed to have fled to the country.
- Participated in hostage rescue operations against Abu Sayyaf in Sipadan Island (Pulau Sipadan) and Ligitan Island (Pulau Ligitan), Sabah with support from GOF, the Malaysian Armed Forces and Philippine Armed Forces.
- 2003: Arrested six Jemaah Islamiyah suspects, Mohd Khaider Kadran (JI leader), Wan Amin Wan Hamat, Sulaiman Suramin, Sufian Salih, Ahmad Muaz Al Bakry, and Hasim Talib.
- 16–17 October 2003: Involved in VVIP protection of the Islamic leaders during the 10th Organisation of Islamic Cooperation (OIC) in Putrajaya.
- 2004: Arrested three Indonesian Jemaah Islamiyah suspect terrorists, Zakaria Samad, Ahmad Zakaria and Terhamid Dahalan.
- 16 December 2004: Participated in the search and rescue mission for the lost Indonesian BRIMOB, in which 700 personnel from the POLRI special operations force units went missing in Aceh after the 2004 Indian Ocean earthquake and tsunami.
- 2004: Arrested three Indonesian Jemaah Islamiyah suspects, Mahfudi Saifuddin, Mulyadi, and Arifin related to involvement with the 2002 Bali bombings.
- 2005: Undertook VVIP escort missions to protect ex-Prime Minister Tun Mahathir Mohamad when he visited Johor.
- 23 August 2005: Five officers and thirty-two members of 69 Commandos were flown to Kukup, Pontian to intercept the Panama-registered 567-tonne vessel MV Natris, renamed MV Paulijing. The ship was laden with soybeans and vinegar, and believed to run off Batam waters, Indonesia. The ship was detected by the Marine Operations Force in the Malacca Straits after being reported missing in 2003. This operation was named Operation MV Paulijing and also involved members of the SWAT units of the Marine Operations Force. In the end, the twenty Chinese crew including the captain were arrested when they refused to heed the orders by police.
- 2006: Deployed as part of the United Nations INTERFET to support Operation Astute. It consisted of Malaysian U.N. 10th Parachute Brigade, Grup Gerak Khas, Australian and New Zealand U.N Armed Forces in Timor Leste.
- 2007: Arrested four alleged Jemaah Islamiyah suspects, Zulkifli Marzuki, Mohd Nasir Ismail, Ahmad Kamil Hanafiah, and Muhd Amir Hanafiah.
- July 2007: Deployed in a search and rescue operation after a Sikorsky S61 Nuri helicopter of the Royal Malaysian Air Force went missing, along with a crew of six near Genting Sempah, Genting Highlands. The SAR team, which consisted of the U.S. Navy Air Fleet from USS Jarrett, 10th Parachute Brigade, the 22 Cdo of GGK, PASKAU, the police General Operations Force's Senoi Praaq, the Police Air Wing, the Fire and Rescue Department, Forestry Department rangers, the Civil Defense Department (JPA3) and villagers, located the wreckage of the chopper at 1324 hrs on 17 July 2007 with its rotor blades detached. The bodies of all crew members were found in the cabin of the aircraft.
- 16 July 2008: Arrested the PKR de facto leader, Dato' Seri Anwar Ibrahim in front of his house at Bukit Segambut in the twilight hours, similar to what happened in 1998, for investigations under Section 377C of the Penal Code for alleged "carnal intercourse against the order of nature" with his former aide, Mohd Saiful Bukhari Azlan. However, CID director Commissioner Dato' Mohd Bakri Zinin said that the arrest was not carried out by the UTK, but by the Bukit Aman's Serious Crimes Division (possibly by the Unit Tindakan Cepat, UTC).

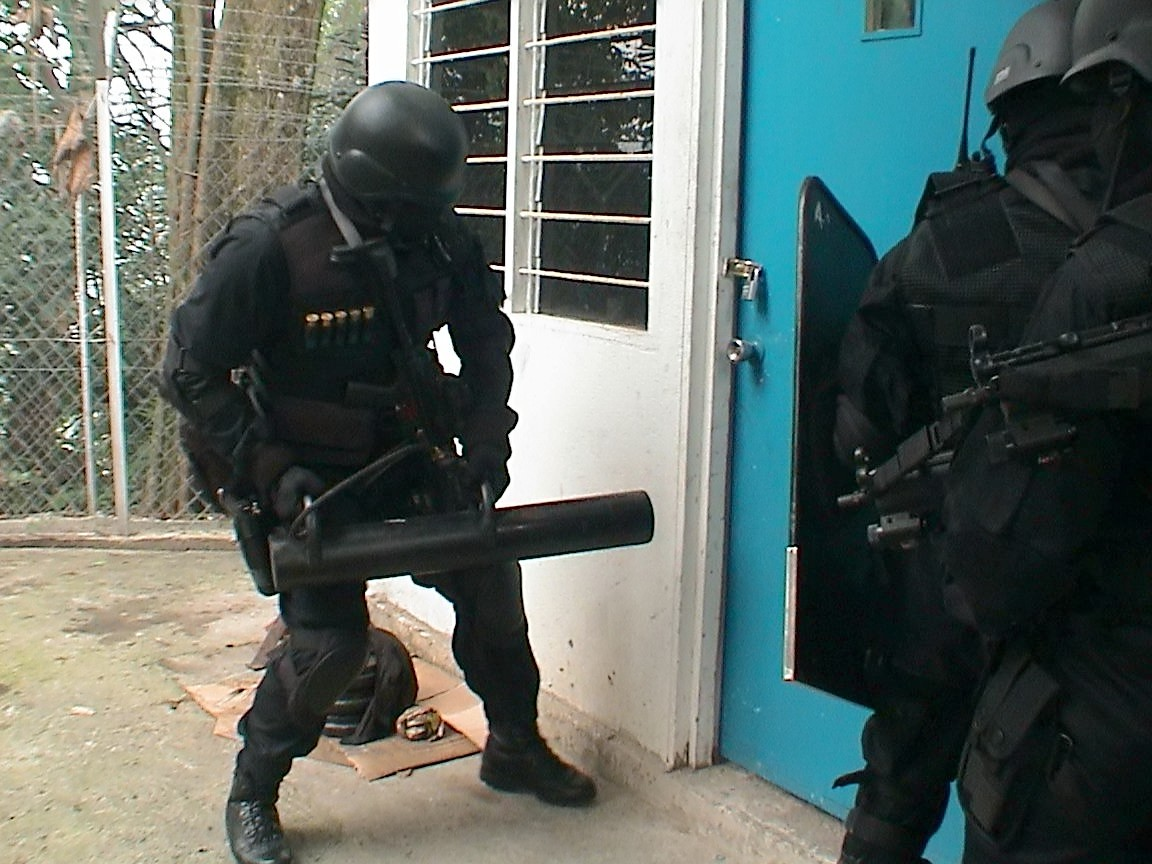
A UTK officer using a battering ram to performing a door breaching during the CQC drill.

- 2009: In February 2008, the Singaporean Jemaah Islamiyah (JI) leader, Mas Selamat Kastari, escaped from Whitley Detention Center in Singapore. A few months later, he was found to be hiding at a village house in Kampung Tawakal, Skudai, 40 km from Johor Bahru. Following intelligence sharing with the police forces of Indonesia and Singapore, in the dawn of 1 April 2009 at 06:00 am, a team from the UTK counter-terrorist unit was deployed to assist police Special Branch agents to recapture the militant leader. Both the UTK and Special Branch members stormed the perimeters of the house while Mas Selamat was sound asleep. However, according to a witness, Mohd Saat Marjo, 57, a villager who lived opposite the fugitive's home, about thirty masked commandos armed with automatic weapons together with plainclothes Special Branch agents broke through two doors and rushed into the house when Mat Selamat refused to come out and surrender when ordered by the police. Mas Selamat was handcuffed with his face covered in a dark blue checked cloth before he was swiftly bundled into a police vehicle and taken away. Other JI members, Abdul Matin Anol Rahmat and Johar Hassan, were also arrested together, and the police also seized documents and other paraphernalia that allegedly revealed their planned operation, as well as combed the area with bomb detectors to ensure that the house was free of explosives. However, the UTK's involvement in the operation was not highlighted in the media due to the top-secret nature of the operations. The arrest was attributed to the Special Branch.
- 2010: Intercepted the Sultan of Kelantan's motorcade (escorts) 30m outside of the Kelantan Royal Palace as they were heading for the Sultan Ismail Petra Airport to depart for Singapore pending further treatment at Mount Elizabeth Hospital. The team then brought the unwilling Sultan to the nearby hospital (HUSM) somewhere 200m from the palace.
- 8 July 2011: Deployed in the 2011 Muar kindergarten hostage crisis, in which a preschool located at Sungai Abong Park, Sakeh Street near Muar in southern Johor state was taken by a 40-year-old man. The man, Loi Hui Chung, who was suspected to be a drug addict and mentally-deranged, was armed with a hammer and a machete and threatened to kill the hostages if his demand was not met. The siege ended at exactly 1541 GMT after UTK members stormed the building with tear gas and shot the suspect. He was in a critical condition with a head wound and died later at the Sultanah Fatimah Specialist Hospital at 2115 GMT.
- 7 February 2013: Arrested a former Internal Security Act (ISA) detainee Yazid Sufaat and two of his friends, including a woman, in the Klang Valley, Selangor in separate operations. The unit nabbed Yazid and Mohd Hilmi Hasim at a canteen in the Jalan Duta court complex whilst the woman, Halimah Hussin, was picked up from her house in Kajang. They became the first few to be arrested under the new Security Offences (Special Measures) Act 2012 (SOSMA) which replaced the ISA. They were alleged to have been promoting terrorism and had allegedly been linked to terrorist activities in Syria.
- 2013: Deployed in Lahad Datu, Sabah during the Lahad Datu conflict. The 69 Commando members were involved in hunting down a terrorist group, numbering approximately 200 in strength, from the self-styled "Royal Security Forces of the Sultanate of Sulu and North Borneo", while UTK members were deployed in urban and populated areas to defend them. The commandos were the main assault team during the early stage of the conflict. Two officers were shot dead and three more wounded in an unexpected "white flag" ambush by the Sulu terrorists, while twelve of the terrorists were shot death and three others were fatally wounded.
- 2 March 2013: Officers and members of the 69 Commandos were deployed to Lahad Datu as reinforcements to rescue police officers who were trapped in an ambush by fewer than ten Sulu terrorists in Kampung Seri Jaya Siminul, Semporna. The terrorists, armed with AK-47 and M16 rifles, had ambushed the officers during a surveillance operation. In the ambush, six officers were killed, while six terrorists were killed after the officers launched a counter-attack.
- 19 May 2015: A team of roughly 300 operators from the 69 Commandos were deployed to Malaysia–Thailand border to search and curb the human trafficking activities in the region.

== In popular culture ==
Books, television and movies

- 1991: Bayangan Maut, a movie starring Yusof Haslam and Noorkumalasari. The movie shows UTK operatives in plain clothes armed with Colt M16 rifles.
- 1996: Maria Mariana, a movie directed by Yusof Haslam. There is a hostage rescue scene involving UTK operatives.
- 1997–present: Gerak Khas, a TV series by RTM and produced by Yusof Haslam, about a fictional UTK squad codenamed 'Gerak Khas' solving high-risk crimes throughout major cities in Malaysia. It is the longest running TV series in Malaysia, which spun off into two films.
- 1999: Entrapment, a movie starring Sean Connery and Catherine Zeta Jones. UTK operators acted as the SWAT team during the chase scene at the Petronas Towers.
- 2001: Gerak Khas The Movie, an action movie by Yusof Haslam, based on the TV series. The film is about the squad's task of curbing pirated VCD and drug syndicates throughout Kuala Lumpur.
- 2002: Gerak Khas The Movie 2, the subsequent sequel, about the UTK and VAT 69 operators conducting joint anti-drugs operations in Penang.
- 2004: GK3, the third sequel for Gerak Khas The Movie. The movie shows UTK operators in plainclothes conducting undercover missions in Langkawi.
- 2005: VAT 69 - Warisan Darah Perwira, an Astro-produced docudrama directed by Jins Shamsuddin about the tactics and professionalism of VAT 69.
- 2010: VAT 69: Malaysia's Very Able Troopers, a documentary by History Channel Asia about the VAT 69's history and formation.
- 2011: Wira Padang Pasir, a TV drama by Astro, about an ex-VAT 69 turned UTK operator now working as a Malaysian Embassy bodyguard in Cairo, Egypt.
- 2016: Kerambit, an RTM produced television series directed by Zul Huzaimy about the Intelligence Squad of VAT 69.
- 2017: J Revolusi, an action film by Grand Brilliance and Infinitus Productions about a conflict between a UTK operative, his Special Branch operative sister, and their UTK Commander adoptive father.
- 2017: Majalah 3: Perisai Keamanan Bandar, a documentary by TV3 about UTK operations and training.
- 2018: Polis Evo 2, an action film directed by Andre Chiew and Joel Soh. The film is about a tactical team is sent to rescue hostages at a remote island namely Cherong Island, Pahang. Despite the team being called UKAP (Unit Khas Anti-Pengganas), it is more likely to be modelled after PGK (UTK + VAT69), whereas their tactics and weapons are similar.
- 2024: Takluk: Lahad Datu, a police action film directed by Zulkarnain Azhar. The film is about VAT 69 involved based on 2013 Lahad Datu standoff.

== See also ==
- Elite Forces of Malaysia
  - Malaysian Army 21st Grup Gerak Khas
  - Malaysian Army 10th Parachute Brigade
  - Royal Malaysian Navy PASKAL
  - Royal Malaysian Air Force PASKAU
  - Malaysia Coast Guard Special Task and Rescue
