= Unit Tindakan Cepat =

Special response units of the Royal Malaysian Police

Unit Tindakan Cepat (UTC)
- Active: 2000s–present; 25 years
- Country: Malaysia
- Branch: Royal Malaysia Police
- Type: Emergency management
- Role: Special Response Team and anti-criminal
- Part of: Criminal Investigations Department
- Garrison/HQ: All Police Contingents
- Anniversaries: 25 March (Police Days Anniversaries), 31 August (Independence Day Anniversaries)
- Engagements: See the Recent operations

The Unit Tindakan Cepat in Malay (English: Quick Action Unit) are the special response units of the Royal Malaysia Police. Based at all police contingent headquarters in Malaysia, UTC are full-time units whose members do not perform any other duties, and are essentially the equivalent of American SWAT teams. They are units of the Criminal Investigations Department. They are also called upon to respond first to any counter-terrorist action, before the arrival of Pasukan Gerakan Khas reinforcements.

== History ==
The organisation formed in the early 2000s and replaced roles of the Pasukan Gerakan Khas (main elite Counter-Terrorist unit) which was the main SWAT duty team throughout Malaysia. It was formed to enhance the capabilities of the Criminal Investigation Division (which the UTC is a division of) in facing and handling all dangerous criminal activities; from both individuals and groups. There has always been a rising requirement for a quick, always-ready unit in various city areas throughout Malaysia. The new unit's role is to handle cases of serious crimes in progress, particularly cases involving firearms, such as dealing with bank and jewellery robberies, murders, kidnappings, prison escapes, and raiding the hideouts of armed criminals.

This unit aids the elite counter-terrorist force - the Pasukan Gerakan Khas - in handling situations more suited to normal SWAT units. Before the formation of the UTC, the Pasukan Gerakan Khas handled all serious situations from armed robberies to hostage rescue. Two states had recently set up UTC Headquarters of their respective areas - Terengganu and Johor.

The UTC are trained by the experienced Pasukan Gerakan Khas, and are fully equipped for all situations of urban combat or CQB. This unit's rapid responses and deployments have been effective in capturing many criminals since its formation in the 2000s.

== Role ==
The UTC special role enabled the Criminal Investigation Division to have its own professional and skilled unit capable of facing all dangerous threats when required.

This unit has also been specially trained to secure samples of crime scene evidence safely to the forensic agencies for examinations. The units main HQ is located at the Police HQ at Bukit Aman in Kuala Lumpur. Orders and commands are controlled by the Director of Criminal Investigation Division and also assisted by the Deputy Director.

== Eligibility and training ==
As mentioned above, all UTC members receive special training from the Pasukan Gerakan Khas unit to enable the UTC to engage missions effectively. Most of the training conducted are urban battle and CQB. Special Operations Forces training are conducted for the UTC to increase the strength and endurance of unit members, maximising mentality strength and exposure to critical and tactical operations. Among the training absorbed into this unit are:

1. Operation planning
2. Quick and effective raids of buildings, road vehicles, and trains
3. Expertise use of firearms and explosives
4. Sharpshooting and sniper

However, this unit does not just get training from PGK. The UTC men are regularly sent to take courses outside of the country to train with foreign units with similar roles.

== Equipment ==
UTC uses all up-to-date equipment for maximum efficiency and effectiveness.

=== Specific clothing ===
The specific uniform for the UTC is dark navy blue long sleeve shirt along with their dark navy blue cargo pants are tucked into military boots.

=== Beret ===
Dark blue berets are used by the UTC. Berets of senior officers bear a cloth badge embroidery, while members of lower ranks bears badges on their berets, which are made from silver.

=== Combat boots ===
Combat boots used by the UTC are the same as to those used by the Federal Reserve Unit operators.

=== Bulletproof vests ===
Bulletproof vests are the most important gear equipped to any personnel of the security forces. Vests used by the UTC has a slight difference from the PGK vest. The latter vest also has pockets for small tools required in special operations. Vests for the UTC is also used by the members of CID, and has a simple design with no pockets. The standard UTC vests are made from Kevlar and are capable of stopping ammunition thrusts as powerful as the 5.56mm NATOs, and the ultimate UTK vests are capable to restrain 7.62 mm NATO bullets. The UTC vests have "POLICE" embedded to its front and back.

=== Communication equipment ===
Communication equipment is required to make sure tasks carried out stated effective and fluent. Each stated equipment only will be used by operation officer officiate operation in the area determined. Communication equipment or walkie talkie of the ASTRO Motorola type measuring medium become choice this unit. There were also stated communication system equipped with headset to facilitate operator use him without the need hold him by stated operating times.

=== Explosives ===
The UTC are also furnished with weaponry suitable and light to carry any operation entrust. Commanding officer entrust to determine fire and ammunition kind of weapon which are used. No with explosive if needed in the operation.

Explosive used is the same with special all teams police and military worldwide, viz from type of C4 plastic bomb and it obtainable from branch of bomb disposal each police contingents. Used to explode shaped any object obstacle while raid made, for example a locked doors. But only UTC officers and men accredited only those allowed to use.

=== Firearms ===
Firearm used are standard which are used by existing permanent RMP members. All weaponry is from the fully and semi-automatic types. Type some firearm series which used by UTC is semi-automatic handguns including:

- Browning HP Mk.III
- Glock 19
- Heckler & Koch P9S
- SIG Sauer P226
- Steyr M9
- Vektor SP1
- Walther P99
- Yavuz 16 Compact

UTC used the shotgun from the Winchester Model 1912 for operation conducted and it use non-lethal ammunition, spreads and buck-shots supply to break down the door during conducted the raid. The submachine gun that timber used are consisted of Heckler & Koch MP5A2 and A3's versions.

Other than that, assault rifles use also encouraged, depend from the Commanding Officer decisions. The rifle from Colt M16A1 type is among rifles which used by UTC with role as riflemen or marksmen. And there is also HK G3/SG-1 precisions rifle which is used by UTC in certain contingents only supply officiate him as sniper persons.

=== Special vehicles ===
This unit also owns medium and light special undercover vehicles, to enable them to move more tactically.

Each contingent and Bukit Aman have at least a special vehicle which furnished with equipment that is required, for example communication equipment who act as "Command Vehicles".

== Recent operations ==
- On 13 August 2004 - An UTC of Selangor contingent successfully overcame five criminals who had just robbed worth of RM500,000 jewellery from a jewellery store in a shopping centre at Endah Parade, Sri Petaling, Selangor. All the criminals, who were wearing baseball hat and armed with semi-automatic pistols, revolvers and home-made bombs were killed but a UTC member, Corporal Amran Abd. Aziz, was wounded during the shootout incident outside the shopping complex.

== See also ==
- Germany:Spezialeinsatzkommando (SEK)
