= UNGERIN =

Maritime special operations squad in the Royal Malaysia Police

Marine Assault Team
- Unit Gempur Marin اونيت ڬمڤور مارين
- The official crest of UNGERIN
- Active: March 2006 - present
- Country: Malaysia
- Agency: Royal Malaysia Police
- Type: Police tactical unit
- Part of: Marine Operations Force
- Headquarters: Port Klang, Klang, Selangor
- Motto: Gempur, Tangkas, Cekap; Blitz, Agile, Efficient
- Abbreviation: UNGERIN

Structure
- Operators: Approx. 60(as December 2014)

Commanders
- Current commander: SAC Yusof Bin Mamat
- Notable commanders: SAC Abdul Rahman Bin Ahmad

Notables
- Significant operation(s): Operation Barracuda; Operation Daulat

The Marine Assault Team (MAST) (Malay: Unit Gempur Marin, Jawi: اونيت ڬمڤور مارين), formally known as the UNGERIN is a maritime counter terrorism and tactical unit of the Royal Malaysia Police's Marine Operations Force. Having become fully operational in 2007, the UNGERIN conducts anti-piracy and counter-terrorism operations in the coastal waters surrounding Malaysia and assists the marine police to respond swiftly.

UNGERIN operates out of the RMP's Marine Police Main Base in Port Klang, Selangor.

For most operations, the unit is supported by various Malaysian special forces units, including Pasukan Gerakan Khas when crimes takes place in Malaysian waters.

== History ==
Established in March 2006, the Unit Gempur Marin was created under the Royal Malaysia Police with the first name as the Unit Selam Tempur due to the pressing need of suppressing pirate attacks alongside the coastal area of the Malacca Straits and open sea area of South China Sea which were continuously widespread from time to time despite various efforts done to overcome the problem. Throughout the year of 2006, 239 cases of pirate attacks were reported according to statistics of the International Maritime Bureau, Kuala Lumpur.

As a result of concentrated efforts by Indonesia, Malaysia and Singapore, the piracy activities were drastically reduced. Nevertheless, law enforcement agencies from the three countries continue to be vigilant against pirate activity in the Straits of Malacca.

For the unit's restructuring, the name of UST was changed to Unit Gempur Marin or UNGERIN in the year 2008. Its eventual goal is to have 200 operators on standby with UNGERIN.

== Roles ==
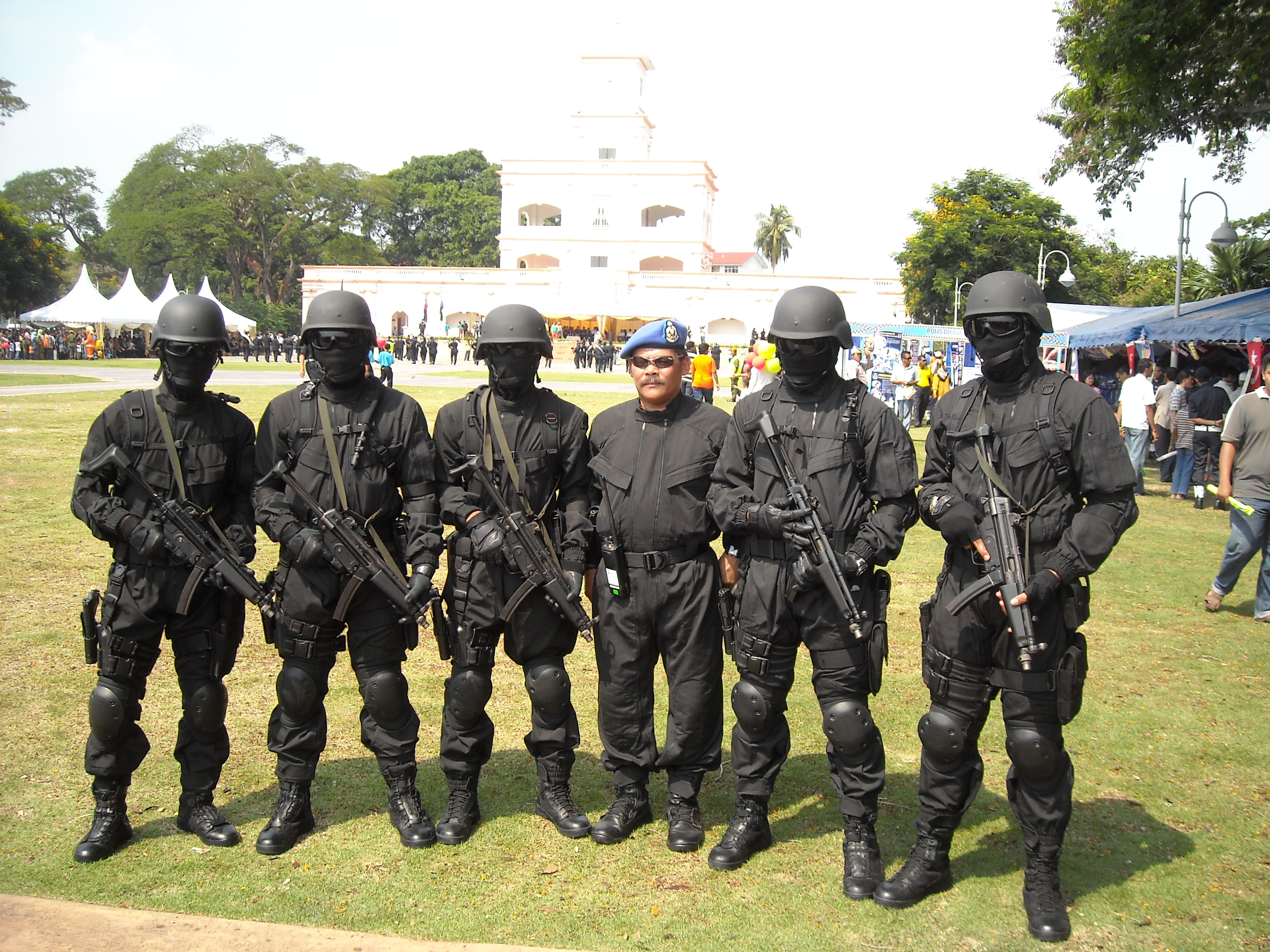
UNGERIN frogmen alongside their commanding officer in 2009

The roles of the RMP UNGERIN are predominantly focused on, but not restricted to the littoral and riverine waterborne domains, including:

- Coastal reconnaissance
- Covert beach reconnaissance (Hydrographic survey) in advance of amphibious assault
- Recovery or protection of vessels and oil rigs to hostile state or non-state (including terrorist and piracy) action.
- Maritime counter-terrorism
- Support to Navy Forces, Coast Guard and customs
- Offensive action

For this, UNGERIN operators are to patrol the following places:

- Ports, lakes, dam
- Islands
- Vessels in Estuaries
- Waters that have human/boat traffic

== Training ==
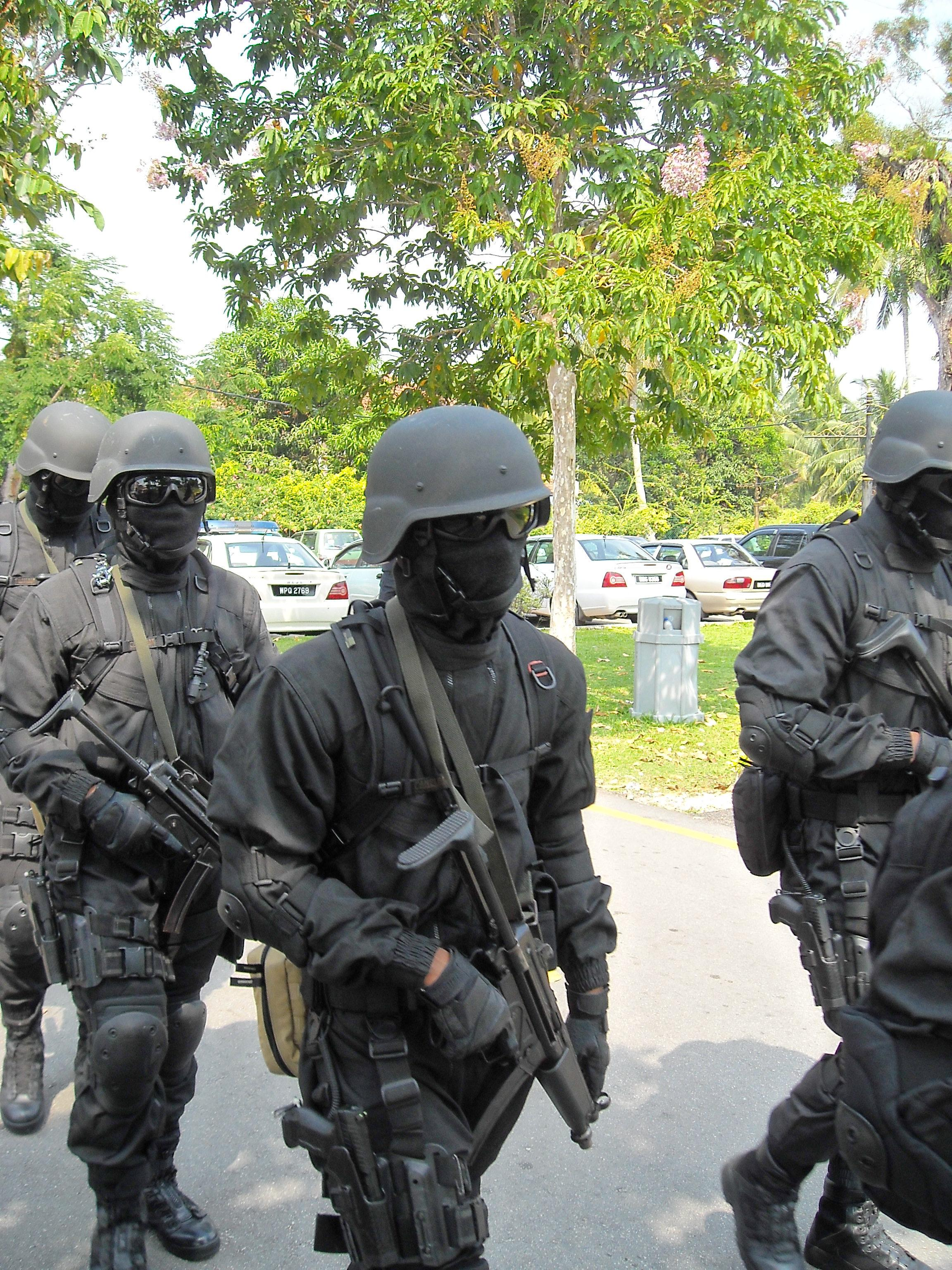
Masked UNGERIN operators armed with the MP5A3 submachine gun while on duty at Muar city after the launching of Community Policing by Johor Chief Minister Dato Abdul Ghani Othman.

Based on this critical need, a specific doctrine from RMP led to the establishment of a marine elite unit performing said task. Approximately 30 members of the squad (69 Commando personnel were sent to this unit), and the unit will be upgraded to a strength of 100 in the future with 70 personnel employed in stages in the duration of two years after receiving approval from the Public Service Department, which are divided to three detachments, to guard the waters of Malacca Straits and the Sulu Sea. This unit was basically trained by the 69 Commandos of PGK. Then, they were trained by the US Navy SEALs from a training exercise code-named Fusion Mint. Training is also carried out with the aid of US Coast Guard

The unit is currently being trained in Langkawi and Kota Kinabalu. Most of these instructors were Navy SEALs personnel. Besides the advanced diving training, they will be trained with other advanced training, including tactical warfare, HALO jump, marksmanship, sniping, bomb disposal, direct action, sabotage, counter-terrorism, and intelligence gathering as well as paramedic training, along with special missions which are normally handled by special forces.

On 2 February 2007, UST anti-terror marine police and 69 Commandos trained abroad with the Japan Coast Guard (JCG), Royal Thai Marine Police (RTMP) and Thai Marine Department (TMD) for the combating maritime robberies exercise at waters of Ku Tarutao, Thailand, four nautical miles from the Malaysia-Thai border. The Japan Coast Guard deployed the PLH22 YASHIMA 5,000 tons patrol vessel to Langkawi for this mock exercise.

UNGERIN has recently participated with the Royal Malaysian Navy on 28 March 2009.

== Capabilities ==
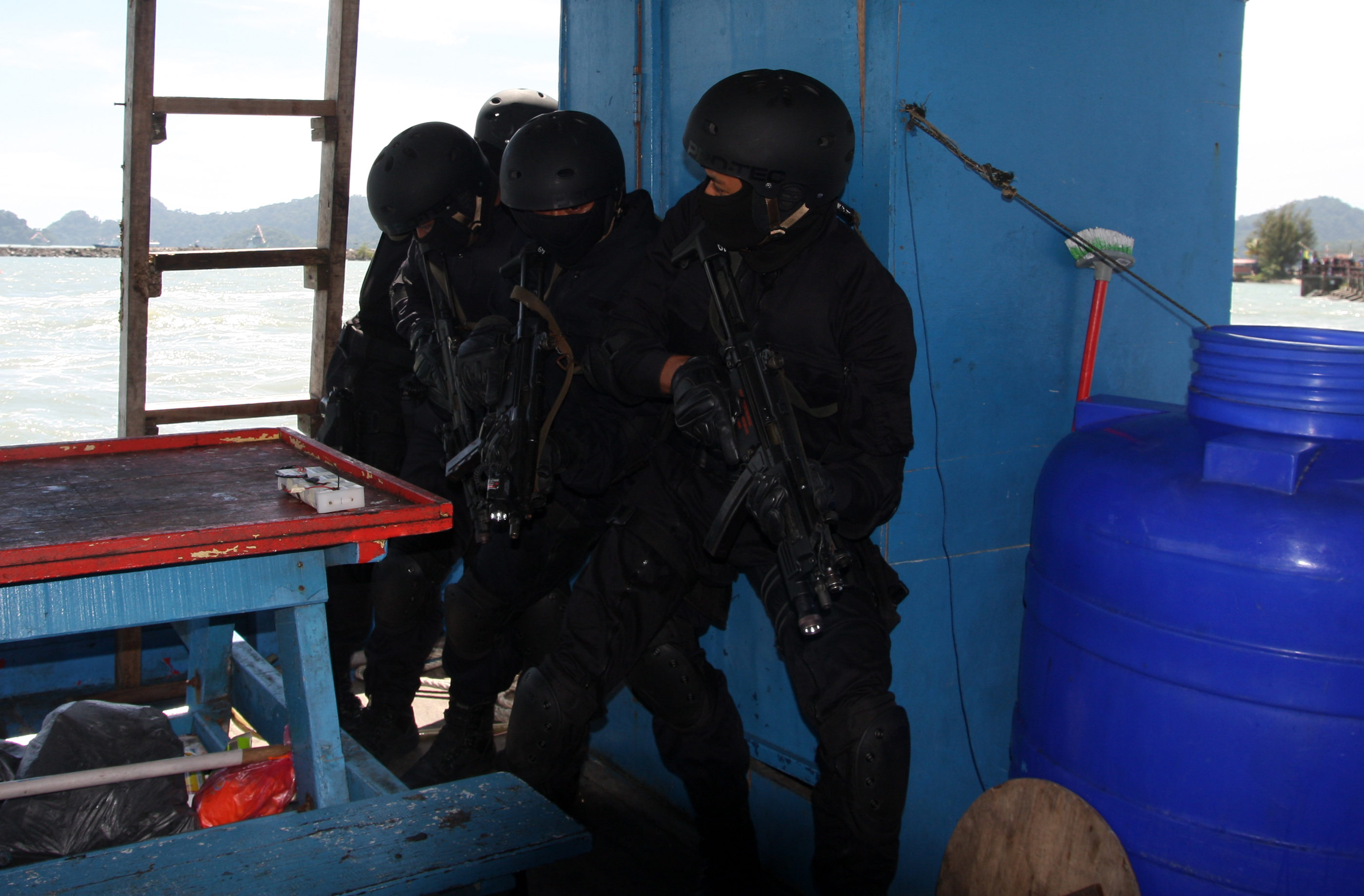
Masked UNGERIN operators armed with MP5A5, fitted with the Surefire 628 dedicated forend weaponlight during a VBSS exercise on a "hijacked ship" during LIMA '09.

UNGERIN has been trained in maritime capabilities such as:

- Diving both closed and open circuit
- Maritime counter-terrorism/Force Protection
- Close Quarters Battle (especially in hijacking ships)
- Demolition
- Vertical insertion (Fast-roping technique)
- Search and Rescue
- Underwater demolition unit
- Port Protection/Counter-sabotage
- Canoeing - Use of the folding canoe during selection
- Underwater Port Security
- Mines detection
- Beach reconnaissance
- Tactical boat operations
- Paramedic capability

On qualification, Marine Police of the UNGERIN wear the blue berets with light blue hackle and camouflage uniform, as the uniforms were worn by paramilitary and special forces of RMP. All tactics of maritime commandos are exactly similar to those of the UK Special Boat Service as well as US Navy and USMC special forces units.

As part of UNGERIN's restructuring, all marine police bases would be made coastal police stations with forward bases to double as coastal police posts for UNGERIN forces to rapidly respond to maritime threats. Furthermore, the unit is very active in developing and testing methods and tactics for these missions.

== Weapons and equipment ==
UNGERIN officers are frequently seen armed with an M4A1 carbine when a maritime operation or a raid is being conducted while the Walther P99QA pistol is used as the standard-issue sidearm.

They also use a varied arsenal of weapons such as Glock 19 pistols, Heckler & Koch HK512 and Remington 870 shotguns, Heckler & Koch MP5 sub-machine guns, FN SCAR-H battle rifles, Accuracy International Arctic Warfare sniper rifles and Heckler & Koch PSG1 marksmen rifles, Heckler & Koch HK11 general purpose machine guns, M203 grenade launchers and Colt CM901 battle rifles.

The unit has its own RHIB navy transport speedboat with the capability of holding ten passengers and traveling at 60+ knots. Two engines with 250 brake horsepower increase its maritime operational capabilities. On 11 July 2007, the RMP purchased ten Marine Alutech Watercat M14 PSC class landing craft vessels from Marine Alutech OY AB Service. These have 22 passengers capacity and 30 knots speed, and are possibly equipped with 12.7mm NSV machine gun, 40 mm grenade launcher and 120m Patria NEMO mortar for use by marine police as well as UNGERIN operatives for amphibious assault duties even in shallow waters.

For equipment, UNGERIN basically uses commercial scuba diver equipment. All operatives are equipped with lightweight PRO-TEC helmets, fire-resistant Nomex coveralls, or BDUs (battle dress uniform), plate carriers for carrying ammunition and specialist equipment, tactical gloves, balaclava or protective face covering, protective eye goggles, gas masks, flashlight (usually a Surefire or Heckler & Koch brand), combat steel reinforced boots, flexi-cuffs, and thigh ammo. Ballistic vests including rigid plate inserts, are standard issue. These vests are labelled with "POLICE", RMP insignia, or not labelled, to allow for easy identification. They often use drop leg holsters, while some officers prefer hip holsters.

== Notable operations ==
=== Operation Daulat ===
The operators was sent to Lahad Datu, Sabah as part of the Malaysian security forces team to secure the area from an armed terrorists known as Royal Security Forces of the Sultanate of Sulu and North Borneo (Malay: Angkatan Bersenjata Diraja Kesultanan Sulu dan Borneo Utara). Other than the official duties of storming, searching and "cleaning up" the villages the terrorists entered, the UNGERIN has also been busy doing something similar, but in charge of coastal areas. Led by ASP Mohd Aris Jambul as a Field Commander of Marine 4th Region, an UNGERIN operators perform to secure a 20 km beachhead from Kampung Tanduo to Kampung Tanjung Batu, Kampung Labian, Kampung Sungai Bilis and Kampung Sungai Nyamuk, to be currently unoccupied.

== Future planning ==
Marine Operations Force (MOF) plans to combining two of its elite unit, UNGERIN and MOF Diving Unit, into one special command. As December 2014, there are only 60 divers from MOF Diving Unit and 60 operators from UNGERIN which is relatively small if compared to other Malaysian special units.

== See also ==
- Elite Forces of Malaysia
