= Marine Operations Force =

Marine Police Force, Royal Malaysia Police (MPF RMP)
- Pasukan Polis Marin
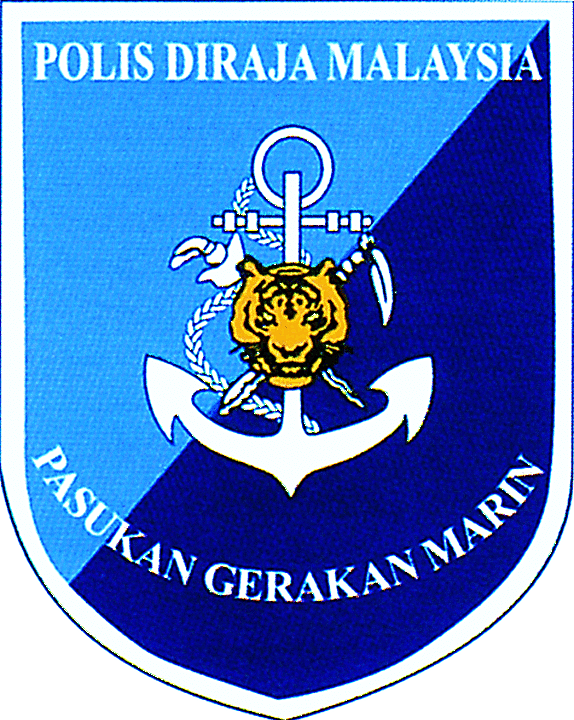
- Marine Police Force, Royal Malaysia Police (MPF RMP) Insignia
- Active: 1 September 1947–2009: Marine Police Force; 6 February 2009–2010: Marine Operations Force; 6 February 2010–present Marine Police Force, Royal Malaysia Police (MPF RMP)
- Country: British Malaya (1947–1957); Federation of Malaya (1957–1963); Malaysia (1963–present)
- Branch: Royal Malaysia Police
- Type: Marine Police
- Role: Maritime security
- Size: Classified
- Part of: Directly under control of the Internal Security and Public Order Department
- Garrison/HQ: Bukit Aman Police Headquarter, Kuala Lumpur
- Colour of Beret: Sky blue
- Anniversaries: 25 March (Police Days Anniversaries), 31 August (Independence Day Anniversaries), 1 September (MPF RMP Anniversaries)
- Engagements: Malayan Emergency; Indonesia–Malaysia confrontation; Communist insurgency in Malaysia (1968–89); Operation MV Paulijing; Moro attacks on Sabah (1985 Lahad Datu ambush, 2013 Lahad Datu standoff)

Commanders
- Current commander: DCP Tuan Hj. Mohd Yusoff Bin Mamat

The Marine Police Force, Royal Malaysia Police (Abbreviation: MPF RMP; Malay: Pasukan Polis Marin, Polis Diraja Malaysia; PPM PDRM) is the Marine Police division of the Royal Malaysia Police tasked with maintaining law and order and execute national security operations in the Malaysian Territorial Waters (MTW) and no boundaries till the high seas. The Marine Police Force serves under the control of the Malaysian Internal Security & Public Order (ISPO) Department with the role of safeguarding the security of Malaysian waters from any threats.

== History ==
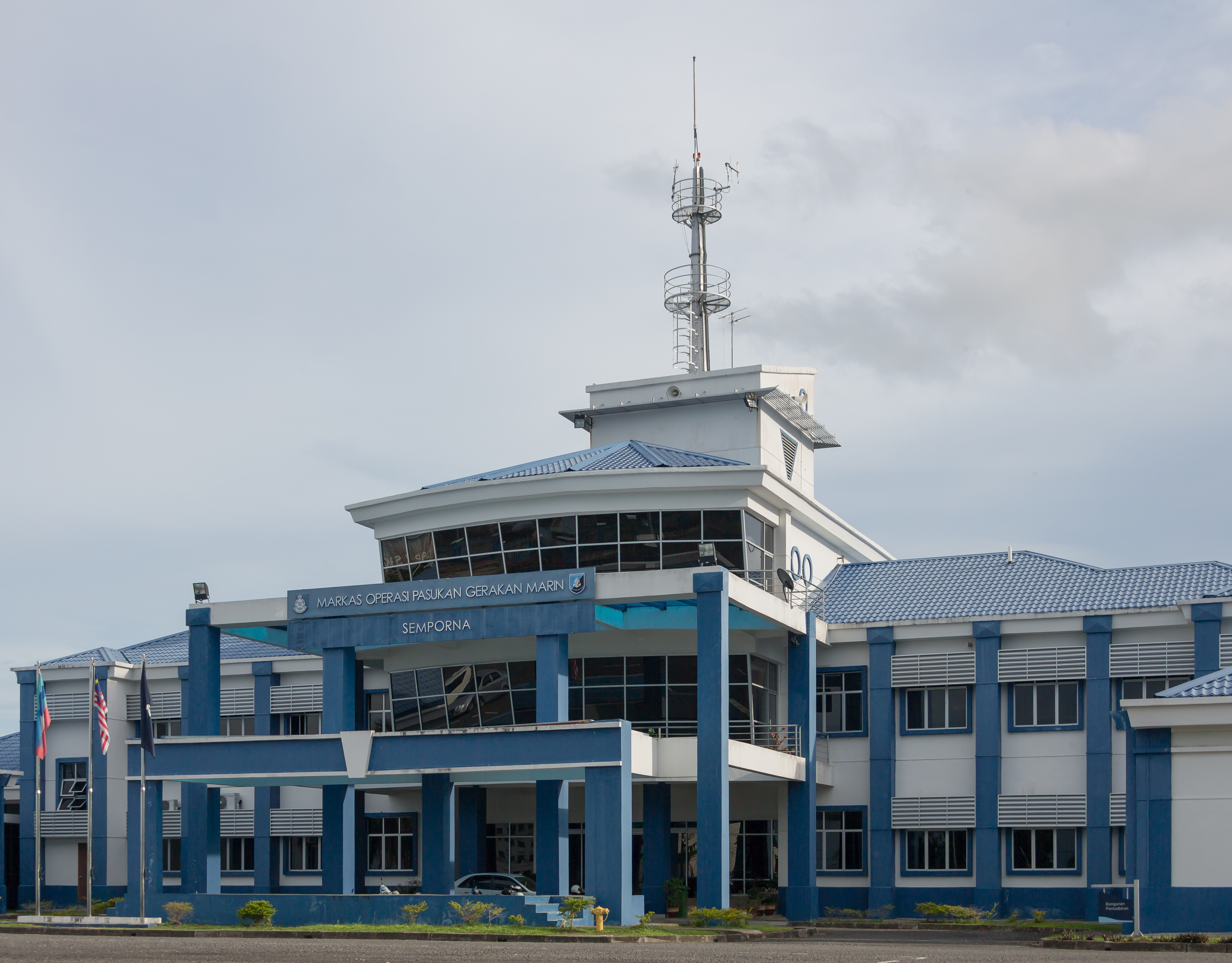
Malaysian Marine police headquarters in Semporna, Sabah.

The Marine Police Force used to be known as the Malay Water Police in 1947 and its responsibility was to maintain security in Penang and the Straits of Johor. Owing to the increase in marine activities, the Marine Police Force was formed on 1 September 1947 in Batu Uban, Penang before being transferred to Gelugor, Penang with (19) boats contributed by the Customs Development and the Royal Malaysian Navy Reserve with 90 personnel.

During the Malayan Emergency, three members of the Marine Police Force perished in the battle of Bukit Kepong while fighting against the Communists.

During the Indonesia–Malaysia confrontation, the Marine Police Force also played a role in the crisis. The Marine Police Force cooperated with the Navy in patrolling the coastal and riverine areas of peninsular Malaysia. Indonesian Irregular forces tried to infiltrate into Malaysia over water, especially using fishing boats and trawlers but many were successfully captured by the navy and the Marine Police Force. Some of the Indonesian Irregulars were shot dead when trying to escape from the Malaysian security forces, as well as having their weapons and equipment captured.

With the rapid development of Malaysia, the Marine Police Force expanded in terms of logistics and men. The expansion was notable during the 1960s, with a marked increase of (40) wooden PX class patrol boats and the addition of personnel. Subsequently, the duties of the Marine Police Force also expanded.

On 6 February 2009, the name of Malaysian Marine Police was changed to Pasukan Gerakan Marin (English: Marine Operations Force) with the aim of making the force more sensitive, progressive and innovative in their service to the community. The renaming was launched by the Minister of Home Affairs, Dato' Seri Syed Hamid Albar at PULAMAR (Abbreviation of Pusat Latihan Marin or Marine Police Training Centre), Tampoi, Johor Bahru and witnessed by Tan Sri Musa Hassan, the Inspector General of Police, the Director of Internal Security and Public Order, Dato' Hussin Ismail and all senior police officers and Malaysian media. In addition to functioning as regular police stations and huts, the Marine Police also took over police shacks located on islands, lakes, coastal and river areas. On 24 November 2008, a total of (41) Marine Police Force bases in the country were upgraded to Beach Police Stations and Beach Police Shacks.

=== Incidents and accidents ===
- On 23 February 1950, the Malayan Communist Guerillas launched an assault on the wooded police station at Bukit Kepong, Muar, Johore. As the result, (14) officers including three Marine Policemen were killed in that assault, known as MPC 60 Ibrahim Bin Adam, MPC 68 Awang Bin Ali and MPC 181 Basiron Bin Adam, while one Marine Policemen named MPC 37 Abu Bakar Bin Daud was wounded in action. The Communists also blew up the Marine Police Force patrol boat at Bukit Kepong jetty near the Muar river to prevent reinforcement of the police station.
- At 28 June 2006, one officer of the Marine Police Force, MPC 144598 Mohd Juriya Bin Awang went missing when a patrol boat from Pasir Panjang Marine Police Station capsized and sank in heavy shore about two nautical miles (4 km) off Pasir Panjang on routine duties, Sekinchan while Cpl Ahmad Zubairi Shahudin and MPC Mohd Khairi Seman, two of the crews in the boat, managed to swim ashore. An intensive search and rescue effort was launched by the Royal Malaysia Police, Fire and Rescue Services Department, Malaysian Marine Department and local villagers to locate the missing officer. Three weeks later after the incident, the body of the officer was later found at 7.5 nautical miles (13.9 km) off Pulau Payar, near the Kuala Kedah river.
- On 13 July 2014, An eight armed gunmen attired in jungle fatigue pants, black coloured clothes and their face covered which suspected is Sulu terrorists or Abu Sayyaf militias used heavy arms ambushed the Marine Police Force officers, resulting Cpl 151279 Ab Rajah Bin Jamuan killed in action, while his colleague, MPC 176543 Zakiah Bin Aleip, was missing, believed to have been kidnapped. The group had planned to kidnap someone at the Mabul Water Bungalow Resort, Mabul Island, Semporna, Sabah, however, they encountered the officers before attacking them. This is the first fatality involving a security force personnel in preventing a kidnapping

== Identity ==
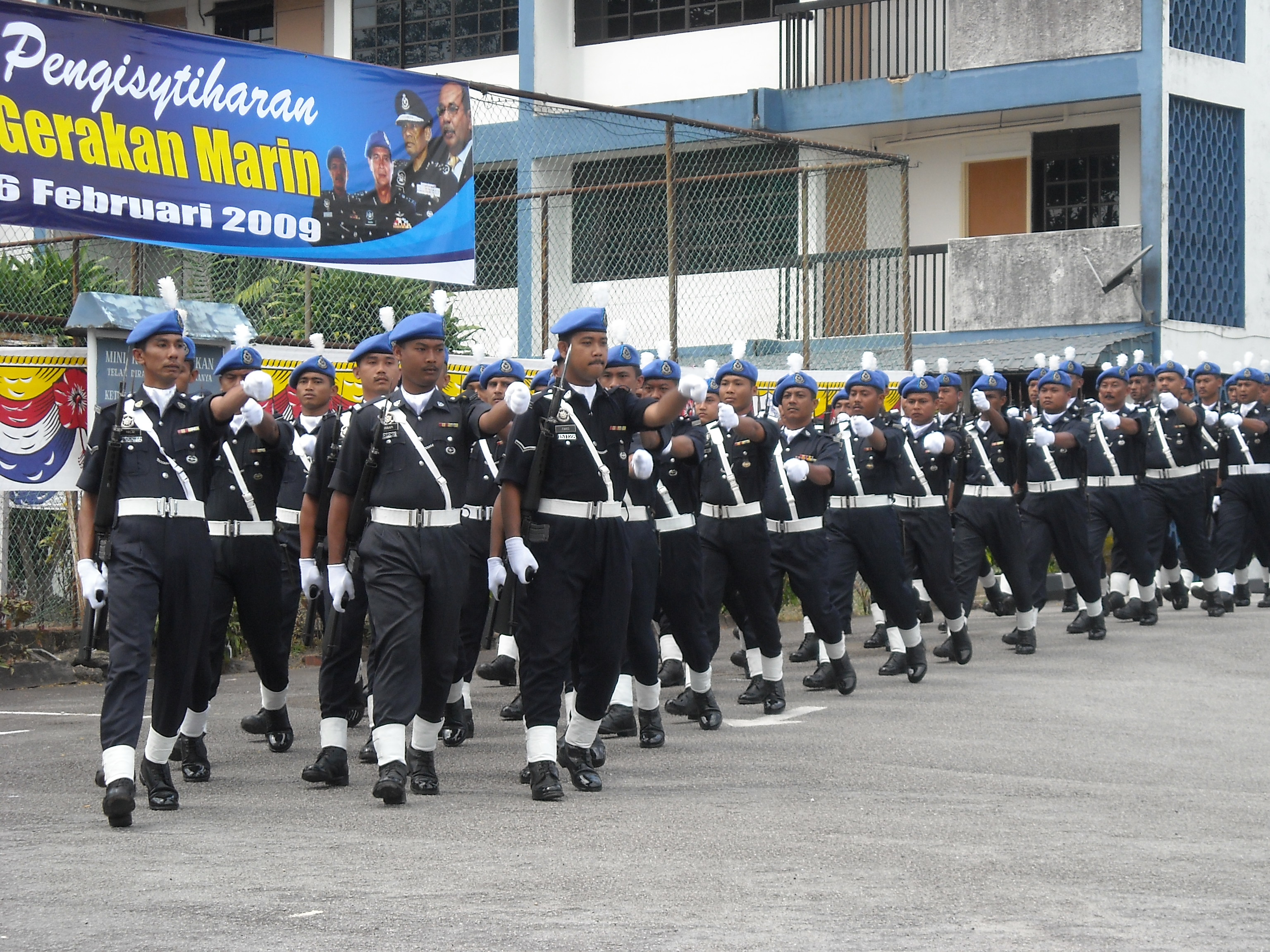
The marine police march during the declaration of PGM on 6 February 2009. The officers are wearing skyblue berets, the new berets of the unit and carried the M16 rifles.

=== Sky blue beret ===
As part of the effort to modernise the Marine Police Force, on 24 November 2008, Tan Sri Haji Ismail Haji Omar the then-Deputy Inspector-General of Police has bestowed Sky Blue Beret to the Marine Police Force.

== Roles ==
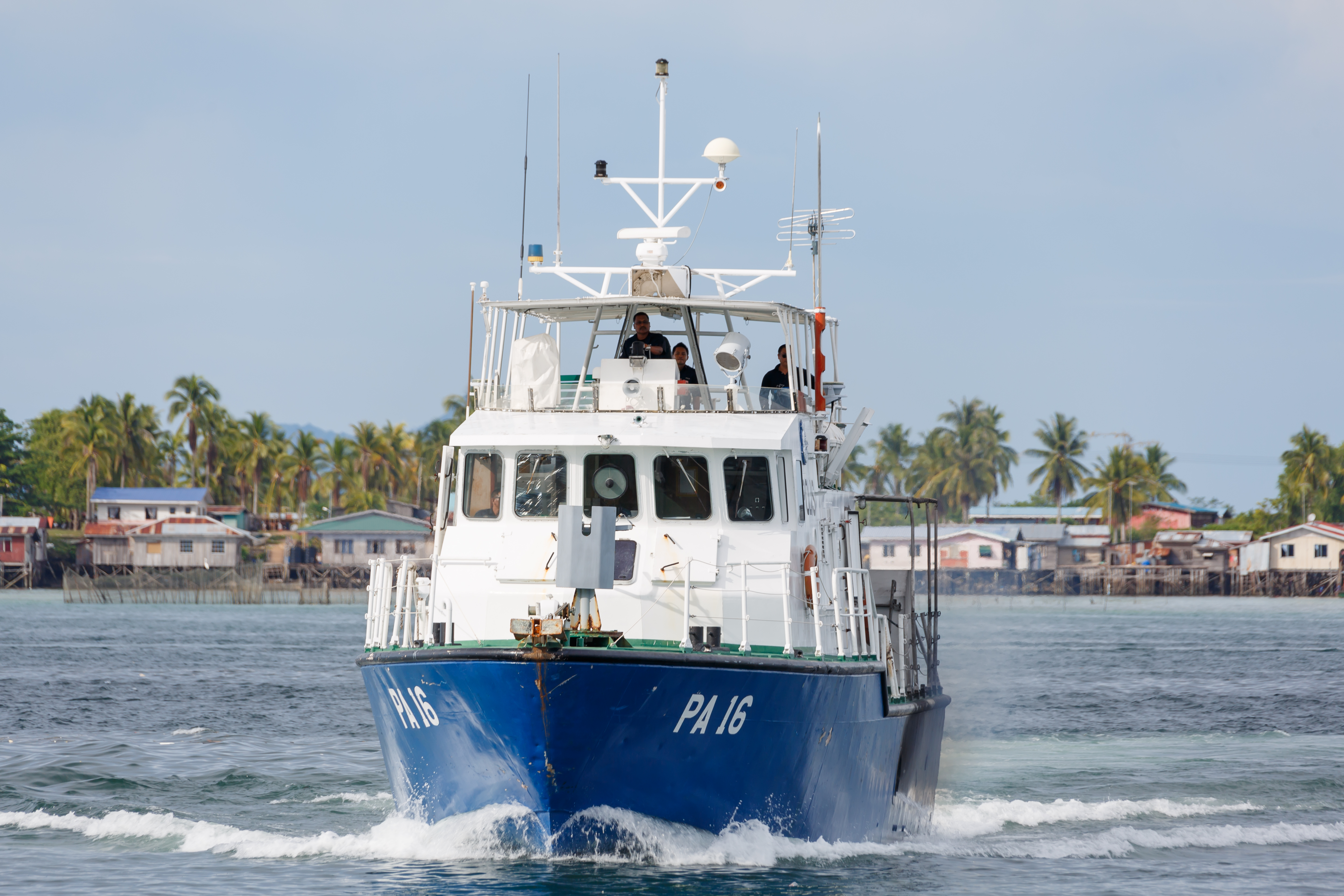
PA-16 police boats patrolling at Semporna coast, Sabah.

This team is responsible for patrolling Malaysian Territorial Waters (MTW), Exclusive Economic Zone (EEZ) and Contiguous Zone. Headed by Commander of Marine Police Force centred at Royal Malaysia Police Headquarters at Bukit Aman, Kuala Lumpur and fully responsible to Inspector General of Police (IGP) through to Director of Internal Security and Public Order Department in every aspect of administration and operations.

The major duties are:-

1. Support search and rescue in the territorial waters of Malaysia and EEZ. Especially aiding in transporting flood victims or natural disasters, especially shipwreck etc.
2. Assisting other units in the police organisation perform duties other than Marine Police Force tasks with the approval from the Director of the Internal Security and Public Order Department with the Commander of Marine Police Force advice.
3. Perform diving duties whenever required by the Royal Malaysia Police.
4. Protecting Harbour from the threats from the sea.
5. Conduct joint training and build a network with a neighbouring country such as Bilateral Meeting Rendezvous (RV), Coordination Patrol, Ship Operational Visit and Information Sharing.

=== Functions ===
Following the Inspector General of Police Order B112, the functions of Marine Police Force are;

- To guard Malaysian Territorial Waters (MTW).
- To maintain peace and uphold maritime laws.
- To protect life and property at sea.
- To conduct ambush and carry out operations along Malaysian waters.
- To patrol, investigate and guard the coastal areas and islands of Malaysian waters.
- To provide facilities for communication in areas accessible only by sea or river.
- To defend the country against subversive elements and external threats.

== Organisation ==
Marine Police Force main base unit locations

The Marine Police Force is currently headed by Senior Assistant Commissioner Shamsol bin Kassim. It operates from five main regional bases around the peninsular and East Malaysia. It also has an Operational Police Base at Putrajaya for the security of the lake and important target. Each of these regional bases is organised similarly to the Neighbourhood Police Centres of the land divisions, and conduct patrols within its respective maritime area of operations.

The Marine Police Force is organised into five main bases:

Marine Police Force Region (1) Penang
Based at Batu Uban, Penang and now based in Langkawi, Kedah.Has responsibility for the maritime activities in the states of Perlis, Penang, Kedah, Perak (Kg Aceh, Setiawan) and Port Klang,Selangor headed by ACP Hj Rusley Bin Chi Ri

Marine Police Force Region (2) Johor
Based at Tampoi, Johor Bahru, Johore. Has responsibility for the maritime activities in the states of Negeri Sembilan, Malacca and Johore.Headed by ACP Muhd Zailani Bin Abdullah

Marine Police Force Region (3) Kuantan
Based at Kuantan, Pahang. Has responsibility for the maritime activities in the states of Kelantan, Terengganu and Pahang.Headed by ACP Zulafendy Bin Hassan

Marine Police Force Region (4) Sabah
Based at Kota Kinabalu, Sabah. Has responsibility for the maritime activities in the state of Sabah and Labuan.Headed by Superintendent (SUPT) Jafri Bin Bidin (interim commander for replace Supt Ahmad Ariffin)

Marine Police Force Region (5) Sarawak
Based at Kuching, Sarawak. Has responsibility for the maritime activities in the states of Sarawak.Headed by ACP Ab Rahman Bin Mat Hasan

Marine Police Force Training Center (MPFTC, PULAMAR) Johor

Based at Tampoi, Johor. Has responsibility for the marine police training and other before start duty .Headed commander by Deputy Superintendent Police (DSP) Sarebjit Singh s/o Balwan Singh

== Special capable force ==
A special operations squad of marine police was established to counter various terrorism threats. Known as UNGERIN, they received special training by the United States where they were trained in the specific doctrines to increase the security of Malaysian waters. The UNGERIN were provided with US special firearms, similar to those used by US counter-terrorist units.

== Operations ==
The Marine Police Force conducts round-the-clock patrols in Malaysian Territorial Waters (MTW) from its five regional bases, in an area of more than 142, 393 km^{2} and 450, 233 km^{2} for EEZ as well as 4490 km for the coastline. It is also responsible for maintaining law and order on most of Malaysia's islands.

While piracy was the main source of concern leading to the establishment of the Marine Police Force, it has become almost a non-issue today with no cases of piracy in Malaysian Territorial Waters in the last decade. Crimes in the offshore islands or in the waters are also markedly low.

=== Pirates Attacks on Lahad Datu ===
23 September 1985: Over 15-20 armed Moro pirates clad in jungle green uniforms stormed in the town of Lahad Datu and firing at random targets, killing at least (21) people and injuring (11) others, and snatched some RM200,000 from a local bank as well as another RM5,000 from the Malaysia Airlines office. The Marine Police Force intercepted the pirates when they retreated to a jetty, resulting two of the pirates were wounded which their friends still managed to carry their injured friends into two awaiting pump boats as the pirates made their getaway back to the Philippines. In 24 September, the Marine Police Force launched a surprise attacks on an island which believe to be their hide-out and managed to kill five pirates.

While the rest of the pirates have escaped to the international border, the Royal Malaysian Police recovered a number of M16 rifles with a whole armoury of assorted weapons. Some ambiguous source alleged on the apparent retaliation, the Royal Malaysian Navy with four ships and three helicopters attacked a Filipino island, bombed the island's settlement, burning houses and killing (53) Filipino residents.

=== Death of Moloi Wuah @ Moloi Hijang ===
8 October 1996: Moloi Wuah @ Moloi Hijang was a Filipino who was believed to be the mastermind behind the (10) series of robbery and killing (40) peoples during his career as a pirate in East Coast of Sabah, Southern Filipino and Tarakan Indonesia. The Sabah Marine Police launched the operation to hunt down Moloi, involving the patrol vessel of PX 30, PC 20 and a spy boat. During the patrol in 7.10 a.m in Kinabatangan and Segama Sea, an unidentified speed boat was spotted in two miles positions from PC 20. PC 20 giving a signal light and fired two warning shots of Very Light to the boat, who ordered the boat to stop for inspections. However, Moloi opens fire to the police team, forcing the crew members of PC 20 to returned fire and chased the boat. After 15 minutes firefight ensued, Moloi and his comrade were shot dead. Police discover the pirates' weapon in the boat, comprising one M16 rifle with M203 grenade launcher and three magazines, M1911 pistol, one grenade launcher, three hand grenades and one explosion material. During the firefight ensued, the Marine Police Force fired over 700 rounds of 7.62mm and 450 rounds of 5.56mm.

=== Ops MV Paulijing ===
22 August 2005: A hijacked ship belonging to a Hong Kong citizen entered the Straits of Malacca. After investigations, the ship was actually reported missing in 2003 in the waters of Batam, Indonesia. At first, the ship was detected by the Marine Police Force who received information at about 9.00 am that the ship MV Natris trusted and has changed its name to MV Paulijing to enter the Straits of Malacca and was on its way from Khandra, India to Port of Ho Chi Minh City, Vietnam. Responding on information, the Marine Police Force sent four Marine Police Force patrol vessels which were approaching the ship at about 10 am yesterday, and ordered the captain of the ship to stop. However, the captain of the MV Paulijing refused to heed to the order and continued to head south.

At the same time, five officers and (32) members of the 69 Commando counter-terrorist operators were flown to Kukup, Pontian, Johor at about 5 pm yesterday. From Sultan Ismail Airport, Senai, the unit was brought by helicopter and they were briefed by the Deputy Superintendent of Police Mohd Yazib Bin Abd Aziz. At 11 pm, the Marine Police Force and 69 Commando were sent to Pulau Pisang and were ready to respond at the appropriate time until at about 3:20 am, when the 69 Commandos and the Marine Police Force Special Tactical Unit (UNGERIN) managed to board and capture the ship.

After inspection of the ship, it was found to be carrying soybeans and a substance believed to vinegar. The ship was also carrying (19) crew and a captain who were Chinese citizens and between the ages of 20 and 45 years. The ship was then taken to the waters off Tanjung Piai for further examination and report. This operation was reported in the 999 program on TV3 in 2005.

=== Maritime Border Control ===
Over the period 2009 to 2019, Maritime Border Control was successful in 12,054 cases of busts and summons above various type of offence in beach coastal and national waters.

== Firearms and equipment ==
Marine Police Force operators are typically armed with the Beretta 92, Browning Hi-Power Mk.3, Glock 19, Heckler & Koch USP and Walther P99 service pistol. Other firearms such as the Heckler & Koch MP5, the M16 rifle are also stowed aboard each patrol craft, with the Remington 870 pump action shotgun as an additional weapon for the UNGERIN. Mounted on the boats themselves, are weapons such as the 7.62mm FN MAG General Purpose Machine Gun, and the 12.7mm M2 Browning machine gun, depending on the type of craft. As a result of the 2013 Lahad Datu standoff, Marine Police Force officers including UNGERIN in Sabah now have access to 7.62mm Colt CM901 battle rifles when on duty.

== Current fleet ==
Currently, the Marine Operations Force has more than 190 vessels. Its utilised the PT Class Transport Vessel, PLC - Police Landing Class Vessel, PSB - Police Sea Basing Vessel, PA/PC/PS/PSC, RHIB - Rigid Hull Inflatable Boats and PAR/PGR class patrol vessel. The branches have 5 main bases and 43 operational and tactical bases around Peninsular, Sabah and Sarawak.

== See also ==
- Germany Wasserschutzpolizei
- Hong Kong Marine Police
- Singapore Police Coast Guard
