= Royal Malaysia Police Air Operations Force =

- Pasukan Gerakan Udara PDRM
- Active: 1 February 1979; 47 years ago
- Country: Malaysia
- Branch: Royal Malaysia Police
- Role: Surveillance; Logistics
- Part of: Internal Security and Public Order Department

Commanders
- Current commander: DCP Dato' Noor Sham bin Md Jani

Insignia
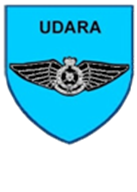
- Roundel

The Royal Malaysia Police Air Operations Force (Malay: Pasukan Gerakan Udara PDRM (PGU)) is a special unit of Royal Malaysia Police (RMP). They observe national security by surveillance and patrol from the air and provide assistance with other national security agencies.

== History ==
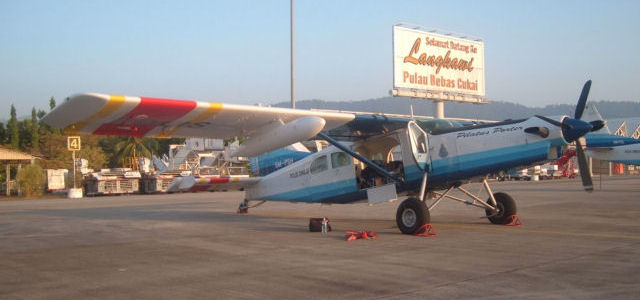
A Pilatus PC-6 used by RMP Air Units to air patrol, surveillance and used by special force to specific training.

Beginning in February 1978, when the cabinet gave approval to RMP to set up the unit, all RMP's aircraft property were registered under the control civil registration. The unit formally established on 1 February 1979 and the title of the commander units at that time known as Air Wing Chief with turnover four units type aircraft Cessna 206G. On 7 April 1980, PGU began the flight operation in Peninsular Malaysia.

The Sungai Besi Air Base was the Air Wing's main operating base in the peninsular apart from the training base in Sultan Azlan Shah Airport, Perak. The Air Wing also operates from two other bases namely in Kuching International Airport, Sarawak and Kota Kinabalu International Airport, Sabah.

On 19 March 2018, its new peninsular airbase was inaugurated at Sultan Abdul Aziz Shah Airport, Selangor. The new air base is located at the southern end of the runway.

Drone Air Operation Force is under RMP Air Units head by Assistant Commissioner of Police. https://www.mkn.gov.my/web/ms/2021/09/22/unit-dron-pdrm-bantu-pantau-pematuhan-sop/

== Roles ==
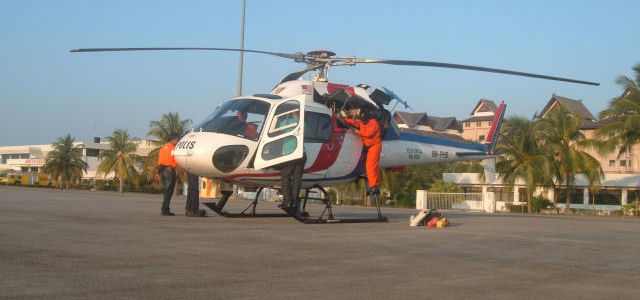
A Eurocopter Squirrel AS-355N owned by Royal Malaysian Police Air Wing Units.

PGU's role is to make surveillance from the air on the east coast and hinterland checking for pirate activities, smuggling and other criminal activities. PGU is also responsible to answer help calls by different RMP branches by observation through the air. This unit is also responsible for rapid deployment of special forces and to ferry senior police officers. Currently, PGU owns 14 helicopter, 6 Cessna 208 Caravan, 5 Pilatus PC-6 Porter and 5 Beechcraft Super King Air fixed wing aircraft. In addition, PGU also operates an unmanned aerial vehicle for surveillance role.

== List of Air Operations Commanding Officer ==
List of Air Operations Commanding Officer
Name of officer	Date	Duties
Deputy Superintendent of Police Mohd Noor Jamari	1 May 1978 – 16 June 1988	First Air Wing Commanding Officer
Deputy Superintendent of Police Larry Chung Yun Joo	17 June 1988 – 28 May 1990	
Assistant Commissioner of Police Ali Hanafiah Hashim	29 May 1990 – 15 March 1995	
Assistant Commissioner of Police Syed Hussein Syed Mohd	16 March 1995 – 5 July 2002	
Assistant Commissioner of Police Abdul Rahman Hashim	6 July 2002 – 2007	
Senior Assistant Commissioner of Police Dato' Chuah Ghee Lye	2007 – 31 December 2010	
Senior Assistant Commissioner of Police Dato' Kamarulzaman Bin Md Jan	1 January 2011 – 2015	Air Wing Commanding Officer and Air Operations Commanding Officer
Deputy Commissioner of Police Dato’ S.Sathiya Seelan	16 May 2015 - 28 December 2018	
Deputy Commissioner of Police Dato’ Mohd Rafique Bin Ramli Ariffin	17 January 2019 –	
Deputy Commissioner of Police Dato' Mohd Hishamudin bin Tahar	15 July 2019 - 2022	
Deputy Commissioner of Police Dato' Noor Sham bin Md Jani	2022 - present	

== Aircraft ==
Royal Malaysia Police Air Operations Force or Pasukan Gerakan Udara (PGU) is a special aviation unit of Royal Malaysia Police. This unit operates both fixed wing aircraft and helicopter. Currently the aircraft of the PGU consist of Cessna Caravan, Pilatus PC6 Porter and Beechcraft King Air for fixed wing aircraft and Eurocopter AS355s and Agusta Westland AW139s for helicopter. Unmanned aerial vehicle also operated under PGU branch.

== In popular culture ==
- Gerak Khas
- Polis Evo
- J Revolusi
- Roda-Roda Kuala Lumpur
- Sindiket
- Akademi Polis S2 to S6
- Pasukan Gerakan Marin
- Esok Masih Ada
