= Senior assistant commissioner =

Police force rank

Senior assistant commissioner is a rank used in the Singapore Police Force, Singapore Civil Defence Force, the New South Wales Police Force of Australia, Royal Malaysia Police and the Hong Kong Police Force.

== Australia ==
The rank of senior assistant commissioner has been abolished from all Police Forces and Services in Australia.

== Singapore ==
In Singapore, a senior assistant commissioner of Police is a police rank of a senior officer in the Singapore Police Force above the rank of assistant commissioner and below that of a deputy commissioner of police.

Senior assistant commissioner of police

== Hong Kong ==
Hong Kong Police senior assistant commissioners are responsible for either headquarter command roles or regional/geographic commands. SAC are head of departments and also referred to as Directors of these departments.
