= Leong Chee Woh =

Malaysian police officer (1929–2021)

Yang Berbahagia Datuk Leong Chee Woh PMW JMN JBS KMN AMN ABS AMP PPN PGB PPS KPK PPA PPT PPM PJPN TM
- Born: 11 November 1929; Taiping, Perak, Federated Malay States
- Died: 18 July 2021 (aged 91); Seri Kembangan, Selangor, Malaysia
- Spouse: Datin Liew Kim Har
- Children: 3
- Military career
- Allegiance: Malaysia
- Branch: Royal Malaysia Police
- Service years: 1951–1984
- Rank: Senior Assistant Commissioner of Police
- Units: Special Branch; F team, Special Branch
- Conflicts: Malayan Emergency; Communist insurgency in Malaysia (1968–1989)
- Awards: Star of the Commander of Valour; Order of the Territorial Crown

Leong Chee Woh (11 November 1929 – 18 July 2021) was a Malaysian police officer.

== Early life ==
Leong Chee Woh was born on 11 November 1929 in Taiping, Perak. He was adopted by a Chinese family of Baba-Nyonya descent. He furthered his studies at the King Edward VII School before his studies were interrupted by the Japanese occupation of Malaya.

After Japan surrendered, he sat for the Senior Cambridge Examination or also known as the Overseas Schooling Certificate Examination in 1949.

Prior to joining the police force, Leong initially worked as a Taiping Town Council clerk after the Japanese occupation, before serving as a chief clerk at the Selama Police District Headquarters.

== Police career ==
Leong joined the Federation of Malaya Police on 1 December 1951 as a Probationary Inspector and has undergone basic training at the Police Training Center in Jalan Gurney, Kuala Lumpur. Since he joined the police force during the Malayan Emergency, he naturally participated in the work against the Communists, he joined the Police Field Force from 1952 to 1953.

As a result of his hardworking efforts, it led him to be transferred to Kuantan District Special Branch of the Pahang police contingent of the Federation of Malaya Police on 1 April 1954. On 1 February 1956, he was promoted to Assistant Superintendent of Police and posted to Perak Special Branch office in Ipoh. Leong was involved in several operations to eliminate the rebel insurgency led by the Communist Party of Malaya such as Operation Ginger, Project Jukebox and Project Jujubes.

On 1 March 1968, after 12 years of service in the peninsular, Leong was posted to East Malaysia for the first time at the Sarawak Special Branch division of the Royal Malaysia Police Sarawak contingent headquarters in Kuching, Sarawak. In addition, he was the founder of F team, the most elite undercover task force in Special Branch in March 1971 and was holding the rank of Superintendent of Police at that time.

Leong was then promoted to Senior Assistant Commissioner of Police at the end of 1978 and served as deputy director (Operations) of the Bukit Aman Special Branch, Royal Malaysia Police headquarters. Subsequently, Leong then retired on 10 November 1984, after reaching the age of 55 (as he was due to celebrate his birthday a day later), in which he took optional compulsory retirement from the police force and government service in particular.

== Death ==
At 18 July 2021, Leong died due to stroke in his residence at Seri Kembangan, Selangor.

== Honours ==
Leong has been awarded:

- Malaya
  - Recipient of the Mention In Despatches (KPK) (1959)
- Malaysia
  - Companion of the Order of the Defender of the Realm (JMN) (1981)
  - Officer of the Order of the Defender of the Realm (KMN) (1975)
  - Member of the Order of the Defender of the Realm (AMN) (1966)
  - Medal of the Order of the Defender of the Realm (PPN) (1984)
  - Recipient of the Star of the Commander of Valour (PGB) (2017)
  - Recipient of the Loyal Service Medal (PPS)
  - Recipient of the General Service Medal (PPA)
  - Recipient of the Malaysian Commemorative Medal (Bronze) (PPM)
  - Recipient of the National Hero Service Medal (PJPN)
- Federal Territory (Malaysia)
  - Commander of the Order of the Territorial Crown (PMW) – Datuk (2010)
- Pahang
  - Member of the Order of the Crown of Pahang (AMP) (1980)
- Sarawak
  - Companion of the Most Exalted Order of the Star of Sarawak (JBS) (1983)
  - Member of the Most Exalted Order of the Star of Sarawak (ABS) (1973)
  - Recipient of the Commendable Service Medal (PPT)

=== Foreign Honours ===
- Thailand
  - Commander of the Order of the Crown of Thailand (1973)
- United Kingdom
  - Recipient of the General Service Medal with "MALAYA" clasp

== Bibliography ==
- Leong, Chee Woh (2015). Scorpio: Against the One-eyed Dragon. ISBN 978-0-9961501-1-8.
