= Voon Ken Hong =

Retired Secret Agent

Voon Ken Hong PGB
- Born: 24 April 1957 (age 69); Kuala Kangsar, Perak, Federation of Malaya
- Spouse: Wong Yen Moi
- Children: 4
- Military career
- Allegiance: Malaysia
- Service: Royal Malaysia Police
- Service years: 1979–1997
- Rank: Chief inspector
- Service number: I/8902
- Units: General Operations Force (1979–1982); Special Branch (1982–1997); F Team, Special Branch (1988–1991)
- Conflicts: Communist insurgency in Malaysia (1968–1989): Operation Taloong
- Awards: Star of the Commander of Valour

Voon Ken Hong, PGB, (born 24 April 1957, in Kuala Kangsar, Perak) is a retired Malaysian intelligence police officer and secret agent who was involved in Operation Taloong, part of the Communist insurgency in Malaysia (1968–89) in Malaysia.

== Early life ==
Voon Ken Hong was born on 24 April 1957 in Kuala Kangsar, Perak.

== Police career ==
Voon joined the police force after completing his secondary education on 12 May 1979. He began training as probationary inspector at Police Training Centre, Jalan Semarak, Kuala Lumpur. He was promoted to Inspector on 1 August 1986. He was promoted to Chief inspector on 1 April 1992.

The first unit he served after finishing police training was the police field force, now known as the General Operations Force. He then transferred to the Special Branch in 1982. In 1988, he was selected to join the most elite undercover police unit at that time, the F Team, Special Branch.

== Operation Taloong ==
Voon was serving as an inspector at the Bukit Aman Special Branch when he was assigned the roles of leader and strategist of Operation Taloong. It commenced on 12 March 1988 at Jalan Tuanku Abdul Rahman, Kuala Lumpur. The mission was to capture the leader of the 6th Assault Unit of Malayan Communist Party, Chong Chor, and his bodyguard, Yong Nam. On the day of the operation, Hong led his two partners, Detective Constable Ku Shariman Ku Hashim and Detective Constable Ahmad Tajuddin Ishak, in a two-hour covert pursuit of Chong Chor's car before it was raided. The swift actions of the police quashed any chances of armed resistance. Voon Ken Hong, the strategist and leader of the operation, revealed that all his staff were ready to sacrifice their lives for the cause.

Among the Malayan Communist Party assault units scattered all over West Malaysia, the two most notorious were the MCP's 5th Assault Unit based in Perak, and the MCP's 6th Assault Unit in Selangor. With the capture of its leader, the 6th Assault Unit disbanded, dealing a blow to the morale of the other units. In the following year, the rest of the communist members laid down their weapons which led to the end of the communist insurgency in Malaysia.

== Retirement and recognition ==
With the success of the operation, Voon Ken Hong was conferred the bravery award Star of the Commander of Valour (Malay: Pingat Panglima Gagah Berani – PGB) on 5 June 1989 by His Majesty Yang di-Pertuan Agong. At the age of 40, Voon Ken Hong retired from the service with the rank of chief inspector in 1997. His last law enforcement position was as an investigation officer at a police district headquarters located in Perak.

Voon Ken Hong was invited by the Malaysian Institute of Integrity at Jalan Duta, Kuala Lumpur to share his past experience – "Majlis Pengkisahan Sejarah Polis Diraja Malaysia Bintang Kehormatan Panglima Gagah Berani" organized by "Institut Integriti Malaysia, Polis Diraja Malaysia dan Arkib Negara Malaysia" on 7 January 2008.

== Honours ==
- Malaysia :
  - Recipient of the Star of the Commander of Valour (PGB) (1989)
