= Borhan Daud =

Former Malaysian police officer

Yang Berbahagia Datuk Borhan Daud DPSM DSM KMN AMP PGB
- Born: 5 September 1958 (age 68); Alor Gajah, Malacca, Federation of Malaya
- Military career
- Allegiance: Malaysia
- Branch: Royal Malaysia Police
- Service years: 1980–2018
- Rank: Senior Assistant Commissioner of Police
- Service number: G/9624

Senior Assistant Commissioner Borhan bin Daud was a former Malaysian police officer.

== Early life ==
Borhan was born on 5 September 1958 in Alor Gajah, Malacca.

== Police career ==
Borhan joined the police force on 25 May 1980 as a Probationary Inspector and underwent basic police training at the Police Training Center on Gurney Road, Kuala Lumpur. After training, he was assigned to the Special Branch, Bukit Aman.

While working at the Bukit Aman Special Branch, he was Chief Inspector. He led a special operation called "Operation Kelisa" in the Mentakab area, Pahang, on 10 May 1986, to detect and cripple the movement of communist terrorists. In this operation, Borhan and his team raided a house used as a meeting place for these terrorists. As a result of the raid, four communist terrorists were killed, and various firearms, including ammunition and grenades, were seized.

On 12 March 1988, Borhan was again responsible for leading a secret Bukit Aman Special Branch operation called "Operation Tanglung". He once again highlighted the wisdom of leading through careful planning, which led to the successful arrest of 86 communist terrorists from the 6th Combat Unit led by Chong Chor. Following that, the police seized many firearms, ammunition, and explosives, including essential documents of high intelligence value.

Borhan's last position in the police force was Head of the Malacca Special Branch with the rank of Senior Assistant Commissioner (SAC).

== Honours ==
- Malaysia :
  - Officer of the Order of the Defender of the Realm (KMN) (2017)
  - Recipient of the Star of the Commander of Valour (PGB) (1989)
- Malacca :
  - Companion Class II of the Exalted Order of Malacca (DPSM) – Datuk (2018)
  - Member of the Exalted Order of Malacca (DSM) (2017)
- Pahang :
  - Member of the Order of the Crown of Pahang (AMP) (2007)
