= Susanna Liew =

Malaysian school principal

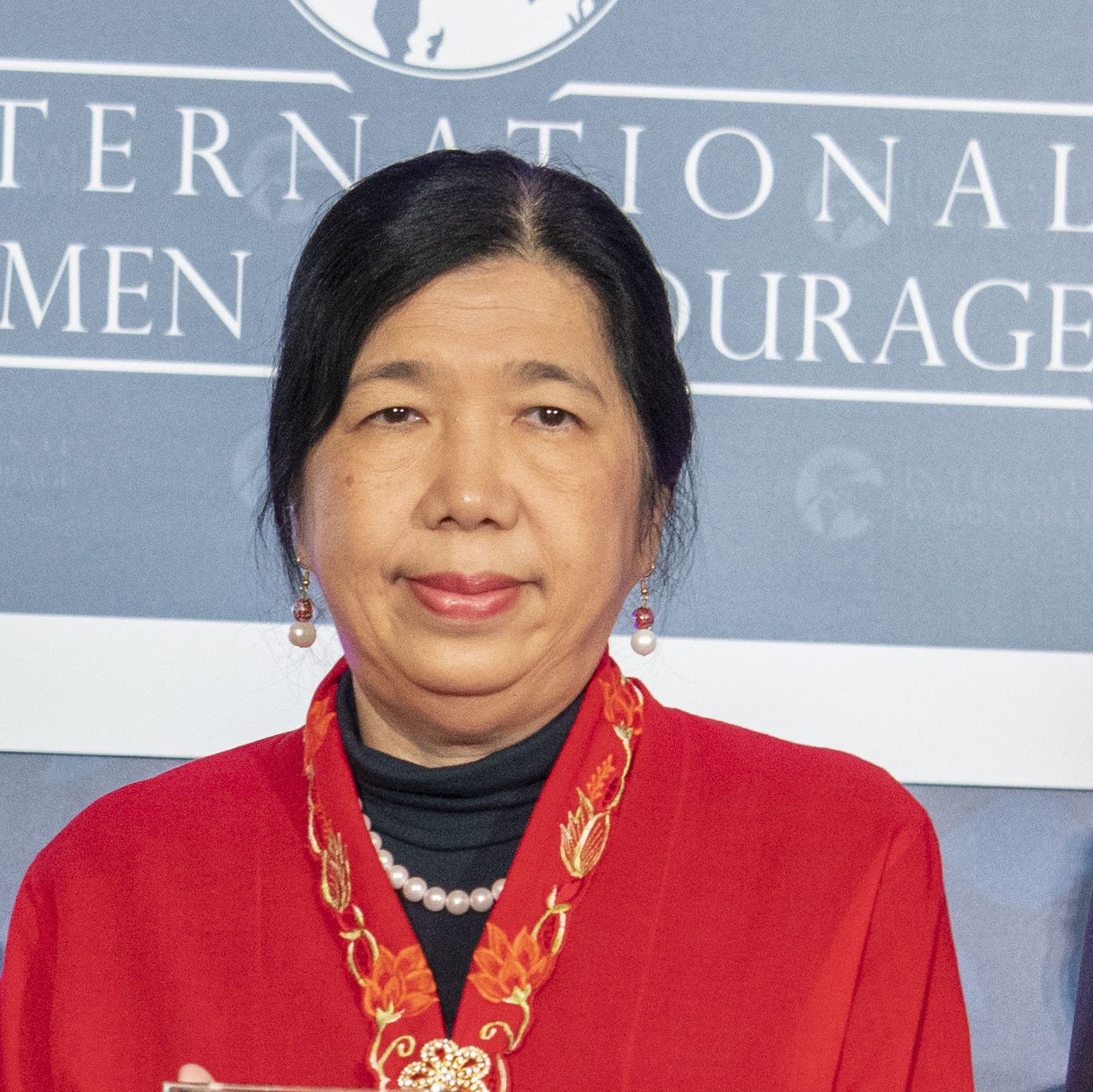
- Occupation: School principal
- Employer: Hope Community
- Known for: Protester at her husband's abduction in Malaysia
- Spouse: Pastor Raymond Koh

Susanna Liew is married to Raymond Koh, a Christian pastor who was abducted by Malaysian police in 2017. In 2020, she was suing the senior officials for failing to carry out an investigation. She has been recognized by the U.S. Secretary of State as an International Woman of Courage for her stand.

== Life ==
Liew was the principal of a school and her husband, Raymond Koh, was a pastor in Malaysia. In 2004 they started the Hope Community to help the poor.

In 2017, her husband's car was surrounded by matching cars and what appeared to be a professional team abducted him. Security camera footage shows seven vehicles involved including two motor bikes who effectively closed the road during the 40 seconds of the abduction. He has not been seen since then.

Liew has tenaciously and continually asked Malaysian officials to report to her on their investigations. One senior official has banned his subordinates from talking to the media about the case but he continues to do so. She asks about her husband but also about others of disappeared from religious minorities. Cases she has campaigned for include the disappeared Christian couple Ruth Sitepu and Joshua Hilmy and Amri Che Mat.

In February 2020, she announced that she was suing named senior individuals in Malaysia. The case could not be delayed any further as it was nearly three years since her husband's abduction and after three years the case would be considered too old.

On 4 March 2020, she was recognized by the U.S. Secretary of State as an International Woman of Courage for her stand against the authorities "because of their rights as Malaysians".
