= PGB =

PGB may refer to:

- Polska Grupa Badawcza, an opinion poll institute
- Precision guided bomb, guided weapons designed to cause minimum collateral damage
- Pingat Gagah Berani, an order of valour granted by the Government of Malaysia
- Persoonsgebonden budget, (Dutch: "personal budget"), in Healthcare in the Netherlands, a program for payment for medical care and social services
