= Kulasingam Sabaratnam =

Former Malaysian police officer

Kulasingam Sabaratnam AMN PGB
- Born: 12 August 1931; Cameron Street, Seremban, Negeri Sembilan, Federated Malay States
- Died: 29 November 2007 (aged 76); Hospital Sultanah Aminah, Johor Bahru
- Military career
- Allegiance: Malaysia
- Branch: Royal Malaysia Police
- Service years: 1951–1985
- Rank: Assistant Commissioner of Police
- Service number: G/1681
- Units: Special Investigation Division (D9), Criminal Investigation Department

S. Kulasingam s/o Sabaratnam (12 August 1931 - 29 November 2007), was a Malaysian police officer.

== Early life ==
Kulasingam Sabaratnam was born on 12 August 1931 in Seremban, Negeri Sembilan. He received his education at the St. Paul school (Senior Cambridge) in 1950.

== Career ==
Kulasingam joined the Malaysian Police Force on 1 July 1951 as Probationary Inspector. After completing basic police training at the Police Training Center at Jalan Gurney (now Jalan Semarak), he was assigned to Butterworth, Penang. During the Malayan Emergency, he served as an Estate Guard Officer for three months and was then assigned to Bukit Mertajam, Penang as an Investigating Officer in September 1955. He served as Prosecutor Officer there for six months. In 1957, he was assigned to the Pahang Contingent Police Headquarters, and promoted to Assistant Superintendent of Police (ASP) in the same year.

He was assigned to Johor Contingent Police Headquarters as Head of the Criminal Investigation Division and District Traffic Chief in 1959. He served in Unit No. 3 at Ipoh District Police Headquarters, Perak in 1960, served in Brunei in 1963 and served in Sarawak in 1964. Additionally, Kulasingam served in the Police Field Force (now General Operations Force) at Kroh, Perak as Commander of the Training School. From 1966 to 1969, he served in Sarawak as Commander of the 3rd Battalion of the Police Field Force.

In 1970, he was placed at Bukit Aman Internal Security and Public Order Department, Kuala Lumpur (KDN/KA) for two years. Until 1979, he served in the Criminal Investigation Department at Kuala Lumpur Contingent Police Headquarters before he was placed in the D4A Division at Bukit Aman, Kuala Lumpur in 1980. He was appointed as the Head of the Johor Criminal Investigation Department in 1982, serving until his retirement on 15 September 1985 with the rank of Assistant Commissioner of Police.

=== Kepong Chai ===
He arrested Kepong Chai—a rapist with a penchant for scarring women's faces with a blade.

=== Luku gang ===
On 7 April 1976, Kulasingam, alongside Chief Inspector I/2813 Gui Poh Choon, raided the house at No. 20, Jalan 20/7, Paramount Garden, Petaling Jaya, Selangor. Inside the house were 4 robbers who had robbed a goldsmith shop a day before. Kulasingam was shot in the stomach, but the criminals were still arrested. After the raid and subsequent shooting, both Kulasingam and Gui Poh Choon were conferred the Star of the Commander of Valour by His Majesty Yang di-Pertuan Agong Sultan Yahya Petra.

=== Botak Chin ===
Botak Chin, a.k.a. Wong Swee Chin, stole nearly RM300,000 after shooting and robbing a security guard at the Horse Racing Club in Kuala Lumpur. On 22 November 1975, Botak Chin and his gang attempted to kill him at an intersection near Jalan Davis, Kuala Lumpur.

They ambushed Kulasingam's vehicle, then began firing at the officer. It was reported that at least 11 bullets hit his vehicle, one of which shattered his rib, ripped through his liver, and punctured his lung, before lodging close to his spine.

Despite the injury, he drove himself to the Cheras police station. On 16 February 1976, Chin and his gang were arrested following a raid and shoot-out at a sawmill in Jalan Ipoh, Kuala Lumpur.

== Death ==
On 29 November 2007, Kulasingam died due to poor health.

== Honours ==
- Malaysia :
  - Member of the Order of the Defender of the Realm (AMN) (1968)
  - Recipient of the Star of the Commander of Valour (PGB) (1976)
