= Raymond Koh =

Christian pastor from Malaysia

- Born: Raymond Koh Keng Joo; 2 November 1954; Johor Bahru, Malaysia
- Disappeared: 13 February 2017 (aged 62); Petaling Jaya, Malaysia
- Status: Missing for 9 years, 3 months and 1 day
- Occupation: Christian pastor
- Spouse: Susanna Liew

Raymond Koh Keng Joo (Chinese: 许景裕) (born 2 November 1954, Johor Bahru) is a Christian pastor from Malaysia who was abducted by the Royal Malaysia Police on 13 February 2017. In early November 2025, the Malaysian High Court found the Royal Malaysia Police, and by extension the Malaysian government liable for Koh's forced disappearance in 2017.

== Background ==
Raymond Koh was a Malaysian Christian pastor in Malaysia who ran a non-governmental organization ('Komuniti Harapan') focusing on people living with HIV/AIDs, recovering addicts, single mothers and children. In 2011, Selangor State Islamic authorities investigated his organization over allegations that the group was working to convert Muslims to Christianity through its various social and charitable endeavors. Following the investigations Koh received a death threat. Proselytisation to Muslims is illegal in several Malaysian states. Koh is married to Susanna Liew.

== Kidnapping ==
On 13 February 2017, Koh was abducted by a group of men in Petaling Jaya while on his way to a friend's house. It was captured on CCTV that at least 15 men in three black SUVs were part of the abduction. The Human Rights Commission of Malaysia concluded that these men were working for the Special Branch of the Royal Malaysian Police.

== Investigation ==
Police arrested a man as part of investigations into the extortion of Koh's family, and later obtained an extension of his remand. However, the police say there is no clue to the pastor's whereabouts.

The then Inspector-General of Police, Khalid Abu Bakar, said authorities were investigating three possibilities: the first being the pastor's personal issues, second being extremist activities and third being kidnap-for-ransom.

There are possible links to Koh's role as a Christian activist at a time when Malaysia is moving to enforce stricter Islamic laws. The pastor was involved in a controversy in 2011, after being accused of proselytising Muslims. A box containing two bullets, with a note in written in Malay threatening his life, had been sent to Koh's house.

== Legal proceedings ==
On 5 November 2025, the High Court of Malaya found that "one or more" of the police officials named in the lawsuit lodged by Koh's wife Susanna, and the Royal Malaysia Police as a whole were responsible for Koh's disappearance. The ruling also found the Malaysian government "vicariously liable" as those involved were considered public officials acting with the authority of the state. It ordered them to pay at least 31 million ringgit ($7.4 million) in damages following a lawsuit filed by Koh's wife. The ruling was the first of its kind in Malaysian history. In response, the Attorney General's Chamber announced they would appeal the verdict.

On 1 April 2026, the Malaysian government withdrew its appeal against the Kuala Lumpur High Court's decision to grant Pastor Koh's family access to a classified report. Following this, the Court of Appeal awarded RM 15,000 in costs to Koh's family. The Malaysian Bar's president Anand Raj welcomed the federal government's decision to withdraw its appeal.

== Responses ==
Wan Azizah Wan Ismail, the Leader of the Opposition, compared Koh's abduction to that of another social activist, Amri Che Mat, who went missing in November 2016. Human rights group Hakam expressed concern over the apparent abduction of another pastor, Joshua Hilmi, and his wife Ruth who also went missing in November 2016.

Following the Human Rights Commission of Malaysia's (SUHAKAM) announcement that its findings concluded that the Malaysian Special Branch (SB) was responsible for the disappearances of Amri and Raymond, and still missing as of 2019, acting Deputy Inspector-General of Police (DIG) Abdul Hamid Bador rapped SUHAKAM for causing negative impact towards the Royal Malaysian Police (PDRM). Abdul Hamid added that he was confident that Inspector-General of Police (IGP) Mohamad Fuzi Harun, then SB Director, would provide an answer to the allegations. Prime Minister of Malaysia Mahathir Mohamad announced on the same day that fresh investigations would be conducted once Mohamad Fuzi retires in May 2019.

In late November 2020, the United States Commission on International Religious Freedom's (USCIRF) Commissioner Jim Carr adopted Koh into the commission's Religious Prisoners of Conscience Project. Carr urged the Malaysian Government to deliver on its promise to investigate the circumstances of Koh's abduction, and ensure his wellbeing and safe return home. As of November 2025, Koh is still listed as missing by the USCIRF.

== See also ==
- Amri Che Mat
- List of people who disappeared mysteriously (2000–present)
