= Senoi Praaq =

Unit of the Royal Malaysian Police

- Crest of Senoi Praaq Force (c. 1963–1968)
- Active: 1956–present
- Country: British Malaya (1948–1957); Federation of Malaya (1957–1963); Malaysia (1963–present)
- Branch: Department of Aborigines (1956–1968); Royal Malaysian Police (1968–present)
- Type: Commando (1956–1961); Elite Paramilitary (1961–present)
- Role: Combat Tracker; Intelligence Gathering; Jungle Warfare; Search and Rescue
- Size: 2 Battalions
- Part of: General Operations Force
- Garrison/HQ: 3rd Battalion: Bidor, Perak; 18th Battalion: Pengkalan Hulu, Perak
- Nicknames: The War People (Malay: Orang Perang) The Silent Killer (Malay: Pembunuh Senyap)
- Mottos: "We never killed anyone who didn't deserve to die" (Malay: "Kami tidak pernah membunuh sesiapa yang tidak berhak untuk mati") "Cepat, Cekap, Ihsan" ("Speed, Efficiency, Courtesy")
- Colour of Beret: Maroon (with yellow liner at beret insignia)
- Engagements: Malayan Emergency; Vietnam War; Indonesia–Malaysia confrontation Second Malayan Emergency; UNMIT

Commanders
- Commanding Officer of 3rd Battalion: Supt
- Commanding Officer of 18th Battalion: Supt Raja Hafiz Raja Razak
- Notable commanders: Colonel R.O.D. Noone, Mohamed Ruslan Iskandar Abdullah

The Senoi Praaq (War People, Malay: Orang Perang) is a unit of the Royal Malaysia Police made up almost entirely of the tribal people of Peninsular Malaysia known as the Orang Asli (aborigines). The name Senoi Praaq means war people or those who fight in the Semai language. Roy Davis Linville Jumper considered them one of the finest jungle fighting forces and was highly successful in diminishing the threat by communist forces during the Malayan Emergency.

== History ==
=== Roots of the Senoi Praaq ===
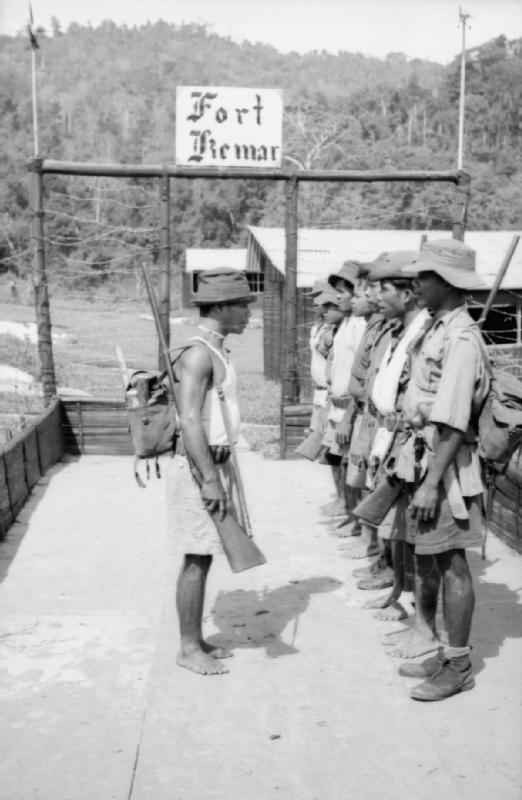
Members of the Senoi Praaq in 1953

One source for the following is Death Waits in the Dark, by Roy Davis Linville Jumper, Greenwood, 2001. Jumper has also written other books that are directly or indirectly related to the Senoi Praaq, Orang Asli, and the Malayan Emergency. They are, Power and Politics: The Story of Malaysia's Orang Asli, 1997; Orang Asli Now: The Orang Asli in the Malaysian Political World, 1999; Ruslan of Malaysia: The Man Behind the Domino That Didn't Fall, 2007.

The Senoi Praaq was the brainchild of R.O.D. Noone, a Colonel in Military Intelligence and also a member of the then British Administration in Malaya during the Malayan Emergency. He pressed for the formation of the Senoi Praaq as a deterrent force to stop the communist influence over the remote Orang Asli settlements in the deep jungles. In 1956 General Gerald Templer finally agreed to the formation of the Senoi Praaq as an arm of the Department of Aborigines (DOA).

The unit was established in May 1956, and Colonel Noone was made the commanding officer, serving from 1957 until 1961. The Malayan Emergency was officially declared over in 1960.

The Senoi Praaq started as a small unit that served as the Special Air Service (SAS) auxiliary, with an initial 20 recruits. This soon grew to 40 with recruits from Surrendered Enemy Personnel. The original 40 troopers were trained by British units including by the SAS, in particular by Major John Slim. Training lasted three months and covered firearms and small units tactics, in particular ambush tactics, with the SAS concept of speed and surprise ingrained right from the start.

Charles H. Ley became the first commander of A Squadron, and had under his command some of the men he had originally captured. By 1957, the Senoi Praaq had grown to two squadrons of 80 men each.

=== Senoi Praaq operations ===
The Operational Area of the Senoi Praaq dubbed the "Bamboo Operations Area" spans two strips of land along the Main Range (Malaysia) from Thailand to Johor.

The Senoi Praaq would traverse the deep darkness of the rainforests that border Malaysia, moving quickly and silently through the thick jungle undergrowth, seemingly impenetrable to others. Although many members are of the Senoi tribe, all 18 sub ethnic groups are represented in the Senoi Praaq.

The Senoi Praaq was formed to counter the influence of the communist insurgents on the Orang Asli community deep in the jungles of Malaysia as the communist guerrillas operated close to the Orang Asli communities and gained support from them. The extraordinary jungle survival and tracking skills of the Orang Asli were legendary and the British feared that the communist forces would gain an advantage if these skills were utilised against the British.

Apart from modern firearms, the unit also used sharpened bamboo stakes in traps called the Belantik, an animal trap modified by the Senoi Praaq to neutralise a more sizeable hunt. A contraption of rope, bamboo, rattan and roots, the Belantik was cleverly camouflaged with leaves and grass. The instrument effectively impaled its victims at torso height killing quickly and lowering morale. Before the Senoi Praaq was deployed into an area, conventional units would withdraw, allowing the Senoi Praaq complete, unrestricted freedom of movement in the operational area. The jungle skills, stealth, endurance, and fighting skills of the Senoi Praaq made them feared adversaries of the communists in Malaya. The unit attained a respectable body count and legends arose of incidents when the Senoi Praaq would count up 10 kills in a single, swift engagement. The Senoi Praaq Squadrons achieved a casualty ratio of 16:1 for killed, wounded or surrendered.

Though the Senoi Praaq troopers were given a choice of weapons, they reportedly enjoyed scoring kills using their traditional weapons - the blowpipe being a favourite. They particularly enjoyed a leisurely hunt that would take a few days, stalking their prey as if they were tracking game.

The Senoi Praaq quickly established a ruthless reputation among the communist forces who took great pains to avoid the Senoi Praaq. Though they had access to air and artillery support, these were rarely used. Instead, The Senoi Praaq preferred more intimate tactics.

=== Absorption into the Royal Malaysia Police ===
The Senoi Praaq operated as a unit of the Jabatan Orang Asli (Department of Aboriginal Affairs) and not as a unit of the Royal Malaysia Police or the Malaysian Army. With the beginning of the Second Communist Insurgency in 1968, the Senoi Praaq was absorbed as a unit of the RMP, to fully exploit their skills and expertise. The Senoi Praaq was named as 3rd Battalion, General Operations Force.

A second battalion was raised in 1970 by the RMP. The new battalion was named as 18th Battalion, General Operations Force.

== Present organisation ==
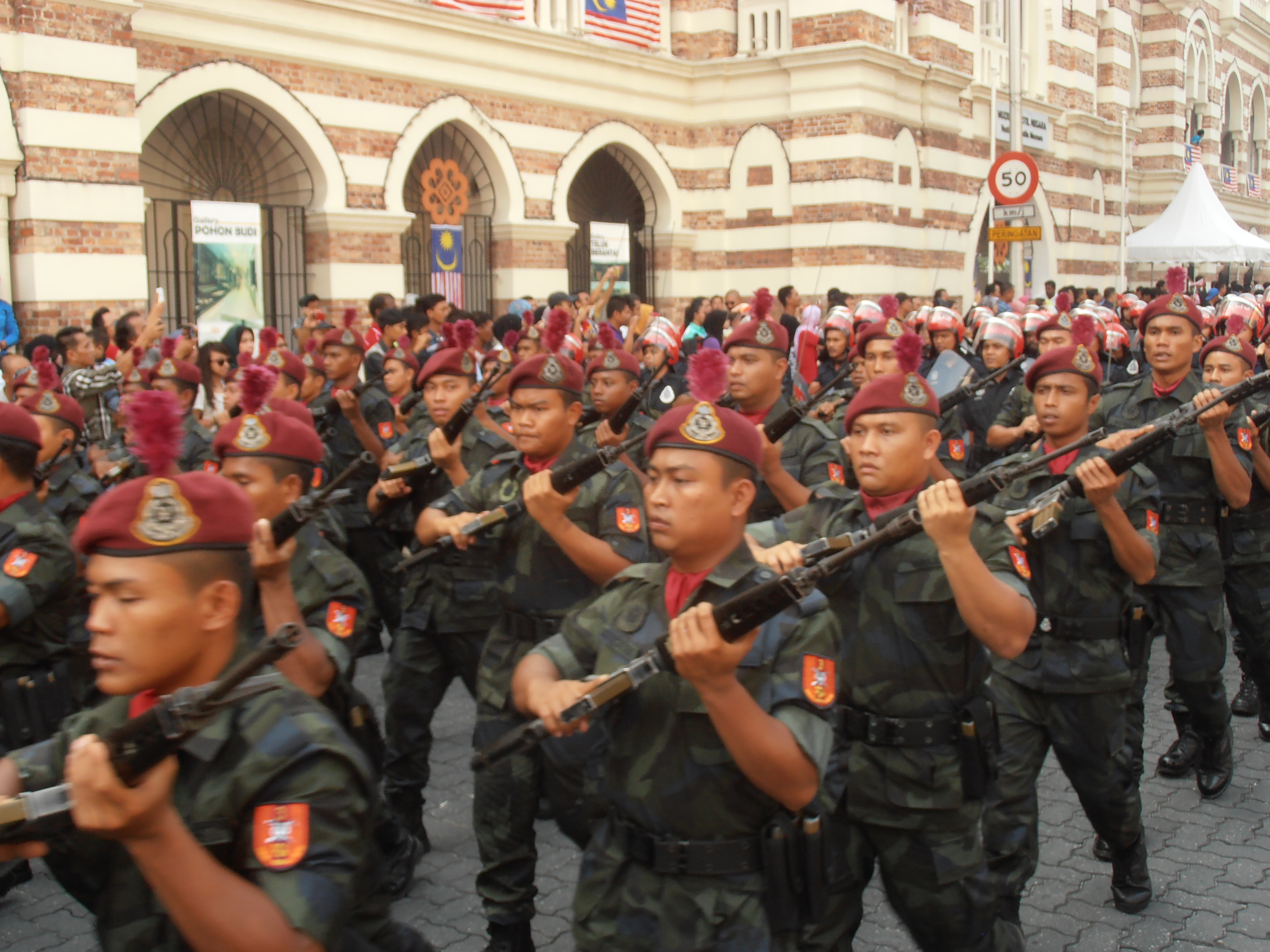
The Senoi Praaq of General Operations Force during the 56th National Day of Malaysia parade.

Today, the Senoi Praaq is part of the General Operations Force (formerly the Police Field Force) of the RMP. One of the unit's main function is border security, but the unit is famed for the tracking skills of its members.

The unit has two battalions, the 3rd Battalion is based in Bidor. The Commanding Officer (CO) was then (2004–2006) Supt Mohd Yusof Wok and the 18th Battalion is based in Pengkalan Hulu. Both Senoi Praaq battalions are put under the administrative and tactical command of the General Operations Force Northern Brigade.

With the end of the insurgency by Communist Party of Malaya, jungle patrols are no longer the primary tasks of the Senoi Praaq. Instead their task has been more akin of the normal General Operations Force battalions of the Royal Malaysian Police.

But both units have maintained their jungle tracking and survival skills and are occasionally called upon in Search and Rescue missions for people missing in the jungle. They are called to assist in locating lost jungle trekkers and mountain climbers.

== Training ==
To enter the elite Senoi Praaq Battalions, a Malaysian aboriginal needs to enter Orang Asli Constable Basic Course (Malay: Kursus Asas Konstabel Orang Asli) which lasts for six months. This course is a collaboration between the Royal Malaysian Police and Department of Orang Asli Development. This course also open to women.

Those who graduated with Penilaian Menengah Rendah (PMR) (Lower secondary Assessment) and Sijil Pelajaran Malaysia (SPM) (Malaysian Certificate of Education) have special physical flexibility of a minimum height of 1.52 meters compared to 1.7 meters for regular members.

== Uniform ==
=== Maroon beret ===
The unit was bestowed the Maroon beret by the British 22 SAS, which is worn proudly by the unit to this day. This beret colour has become synonymous with the group instead of SAS sand-coloured ones because during their formation in 1956, the Malayan Scouts (now 22 SAS) wore maroon berets.

During the restructuring of the Police Field Force in 1997, the Senoi Praaq was made part of the Police General Operations Forces and made to wear the blue berets but this was rescinded and the right to wear the red berets was restored in 2003.

== Killed in the line of duty ==
Rank/No.	Name	Date	Notes
Insp I/8294	Gunasegaran Naidu s/o Ratinum	1980-06-09	Killed during the Operation Bamboo at Ulu Kelantan. He was awarded the Star of the Commander of Valour.
Cpl 112512	Baharuddin bin Ramli	2020-11-24	Cpl 112512 was on duty at the Malaysia-Thailand border post in Padang Besar, Kangar with fellow officer Cpl 148715 Norihan s/o Tari were ambushed by ten or thirteen assailants at early morning, believed it is kratom smugglers. In the 3.10am incident, Cpl 112512 died at the scene while Cpl 148715 was seriously wounded and has been taken to the Tuanku Fauziah Hospital. During the gunfight, four assailants also wounded were among those who retreat across the border. After sweeping the crime scene, the 69 Commando operatives arrests two assailants, a Thai nationals, identified as Sahamadyusob Talah, 38, and other man was not named while three of them, Sanchai Madsuwan, Arun Madsuwan and Rachen Anumarn, also Thais were subsequently arrested by the Thai police when they were treated at Hat Yai hospital.

== Notable members ==
- Chief Inspector Long A/L Pandak, Chief Inspector Long was one of the PDRM leaders responsible for expelling and crippling Communist insurgents plans to join enemy groups from Perak, Kelantan and Thailand in a special operation known as Operation Bamboo on the Perak-Kelantan border. In the operation, he bravely took Inspector Gunasegaran who was seriously injured as a result of being shot by Communist militants to a safer place. Before exhaling his last breath, Insp Gunasegaran ordered C/Insp Long to continue the struggle and eliminate the Communist insurgents. C/Insp Long took over the leadership of the platoon and reorganized the attack until he succeeded in killing two Communist fighters as well as capturing the rest of the group along with important confidential documents.
- Inspector Gunasegaran Naidu s/o Ratinum is a well known Senoi Praaq member who led an operation on 9 June 1980, Inspector Gunasegaran Naidu Ratinam led 21 Senoi Praaq policemen into the jungle in Ulu Kelantan to participate in a special operation to hunt down communist members called Operations Bambu. Hours after being in enemy territory, his troops were bombarded with communist bullets. The shooting went really well. Gunasegaran quietly went forward alone to find a suitable position to return the shot. He managed to shoot dead one of them but unfortunately happened when he was shot in the chest.
- Sergeant Major Ana anak Alang, P.P.N., is a Senoi Praaq trooper famed for avenging the death of his platoon leader by tracking the ambush party that killed him. On 9 June 1980 at upstream Blaur River, Pos GOB, Kelantan, a Special Platoon of Senoi Praaq with the strength of 21 troopers led by Inspector Gunasegaran had been ambushed when investigating communist tracks. The ambush took the life of Inspector Gunasegaran. Ana anak Alang tracked the ambush party of 20 insurgents before he and the rest of the platoon met them 11 days later at upstream Bertak River, Pos Gob, Kelantan. They proceeded to ambush the communists and managed to kill one and injure the others. Because of his service in defending the country, Sergeant Major Ana anak Alang was awarded with the Medal of the Order of the Defender of the Realm (Malay: Pingat Pangkuan Negara; P.P.N.) in 1996 by the King of Malaysia.
- Sergeant Major Apot anak Saad, is a Senoi Praaq trooper-turned-commando famed for being part of the Commando Task Force led by the late Assistant Superintendent Mohd Zabri Abdul Hamid, S.P. The Task Force then became the present day VAT 69 Commando. Apot anak Saad entered the service in 1968 when he was 19 years old. His first unit was the Senoi Praaq before entering the newly formed Jungle Squad Commando Task Force in 1970. Apot anak Saad is famed for his unmatched skill in tracking and hunting. Because of his expertise, Apot often collaborated with the New Zealand Special Air Service and Australian Special Air Service Regiment during the Second Malayan Emergency as a tracker. His story as a Tracker in Task Force was documented by History Channel Asia in a documentary titled "VAT 69: Malaysia's Very Able Troopers ".

- Chief Inspector BAH ALI A/L KINCHONG

Chief Inspector Bah Ali was one of the PDRM leaders responsible for expelling and crippling Communist insurgents plans. After his retirement, Bah Ali officially opened an Orang Asli settlement in Bidor, Perak. The settlement was named Kampung Orang Asli Kuala Senta. A monument has been built in the village to honour him.

•ASP Dato Mohd Nor Abdullah @ Bah Ayob

Bah Ayob is an indigenous Semai tribe who serves as a police officer in the Senoi Praaq force. He was among the earliest indigenous people selected in the Senoi Praaq force since it was established in 1955. He held body number 001 in the Senoi Praaq team and retired from the Royal Malaysian Police with the final rank of Assistant Superintendent on 31 December 1989, Bah Ayob passed away in October 2021

•SUPT Syed Zainal Al Sagof

He served in the force from 1957 until his retirement in 1992, holding the position of Commanding Officer of the 20th Battalion of the Field Police Force.

== In popular culture ==
•2010:Mini series 8 episod titled Lembing & Layang about a group communist defector of Aboriginal later establish Senior Praaq.Starring by Azhan Rani, Beto Kusyairy, Fikhree Bakar and Namron on aired in Astro Citra.

•2026: A biopic historical film, Orang Perang The Silent Killer. Staring by Niezam Zaidi, Syazwan Zulkifli and Fauzi Nawawi.

== Notes ==
- Orang Asli Museum
- Shantini Suntharajah, article in The Star
- Roy Davis Linville Jumper, Death Waits in the Dark: The Senoi Praaq, Malaysia's Killer Elite. See .
- Richard Noone, with Dennis Holman, In Search of the Dream People, 1972, published in Great Britain under the title Rape of the Dream People.

== See also ==
- Elite Forces of Malaysia
