= Star of the Commander of Valour =

- Type: Order of Honour
- Awarded for: Extraordinary valour and courage in the face of the enemy.
- Presented by: Malaysia
- Eligibility: Members of the armed forces or law enforcement
- Post-nominals: P.G.B. or PGB
- Ribbon: Diagonal stripes of white, blue, yellow and red.
- Status: Currently issued
- Established: 29 July 1960
- First award: 31 August 1958
- Final award: 2023

Highlights
- Total: 98
- Total awarded posthumously: 17
- Total recipients: 115
- Ribbon of the PGB

Precedence
- Next (higher): Order of Loyalty to the Royal Family of Malaysia
- Next (lower): Federation Gallantry Star

The Star of the Commander of Valour (Malay: Panglima Gagah Berani) is a medal awarded by the Malaysian government. The award was established on 29 July 1960, and it was formally gazetted by a statute on 11 August 1960. It is Malaysia's second highest gallantry award, coming in second only to the Grand Knight of Valour (Malay: Darjah Kebesaran Seri Pahlawan Gagah Perkasa).

Only members of the military (i.e. all services under the Malaysian Armed Forces) and members of law enforcement forces (e.g. Royal Malaysia Police and Malaysian Maritime Enforcement Agency) are eligible for the award. It can be bestowed posthumously.

When compared to British Armed Forces military awards, this award is equivalent to the Conspicuous Gallantry Cross.

== Allowance ==
The award was established on 29 July 1960 under the Statutes of Panglima Gagah Berani [G.N. 3151/1960], however it's not until 1983 that the Malaysian government started paying allowance to the recipients.

In 2001, the Panglima Gagah Berani (Remembrance Allowance) Act 2001 [Act 616] was enacted, which fixed the monthly allowance for living recipients at RM300 for each medal he received. Under the Act, the next of kin of posthumous recipients would also receive a one-off compensation of RM15,000. This medal may also be given to the same person for more than once.

On 1 July 2009, the monthly allowance for living recipients was raised to RM1,500 after the government passed an amendment to the Act in parliament the same year.

The allowance may be revoked if any of the following conditions are met:

1. The recipient passed away.
2. The recipient is guilty of criminal offence and sentenced to either death or imprisonment.
3. The award was revoked in accordance with Section VIII of the Statutes of Panglima Gagah Berani.

== Appearance ==
The medal is made of pure silver and is shaped like a five-pointed star. On the star, two Kris lie beneath the Malaysian royal crown. A ribbon with 45° stripes slanting right holds the star. Stripes come in red, white, blue, and yellow.

== List of recipients ==
As of the year 2023, 115 people have been awarded the Star of the Commander of Valour.

#	Name	Rank at the time	Year	Uniformed services	Unit at that time	Note
1	Abdul Rahman bin Haji Khamis	Lieutenant	1958	Malaysian Army	Malay Regiment	
2	Chong Yong Chin	Sergeant	1958	Malaysian Army	Federation Regiment	
3	Hashim bin Jantan	Lance Corporal	1958	Malaysian Army	Malay Regiment	
4	Mohamed Ghazali bin Haji Che Mat	Captain	1958	Malaysian Army	Malay Regiment	
5	Choo Wah Soon	Lance Corporal	1961	Malaysian Army	Federation Reconnaissance Regiment	
6	Maurice Lam Shye Choon	Captain	1963	Malaysian Army	Federation Reconnaissance Regiment	
7	Neville Herbert Siebel	Lieutenant	1963	Malaysian Army	Federation Reconnaissance Regiment	
8	Lee Ah Pow	Captain	1964	Malaysian Army	Malaysian Reconnaissance Regiment	
9	Kamaruddin bin Mohd Jamal	2nd Lieutenant	1965	Malaysian Army	Royal Malay Regiment	
10	Abdul Kadir bin Nordin	2nd Lieutenant	1966	Malaysian Army	Royal Malay Regiment	
11	Ismail bin Ghows	Major	1967	Malaysian Army	Royal Malay Regiment	
12	Mahmor bin Said	Trooper	1968	Malaysian Army	Malaysian Special Service Unit	
13	Baharin bin Abdul Jalil	2nd Lieutenant	1971	Malaysian Army	Malaysian Ranger Regiment	
14	Dajai anak Anggie	Corporal	1971	Malaysian Army	Malaysian Ranger Regiment	
15	David Fu Chee Ming	2nd Lieutenant	1971	Malaysian Army	Malaysian Ranger Regiment	
16	Ismail bin Salleh	Major	1971	Malaysian Army	Royal Malay Regiment	
17	Lan anak Gima	Ranger	1971	Malaysian Army	Malaysian Ranger Regiment	
18	Mileng anak Kilong	Sergeant	1971	Malaysian Army	Malaysian Ranger Regiment	
19	Unggek anak Antin	Ranger	1971	Malaysian Army	Malaysian Ranger Regiment	
20	Wan Hassan bin Haji Wan Ahmad	2nd Lieutenant	1971	Malaysian Army	Royal Malay Regiment	
21	Zi bin Yaakub	Private	1971	Malaysian Army	Royal Malay Regiment	
22	Bajau anak Ladi	Ranger	1972	Malaysian Army	Malaysian Ranger Regiment	
23	Indang anak Engkas	Sergeant	1972	Malaysian Army	Malaysian Ranger Regiment	
24	Kassim bin Abdul Kadir	2nd Lieutenant	1972	Malaysian Army	Intelligence Corps	
25	Mering anak Imang	Lance Corporal	1972	Malaysian Army	Malaysian Ranger Regiment	
26	Osman bin Shariff	Sergeant	1972	Malaysian Army	Royal Reconnaissance Regiment	
27	Jantan bin Nyamat	Sergeant	1973	Malaysian Army	Royal Malay Regiment	
28	Ahmad bin Adnan	Corporal	1973	Malaysian Army	Malaysian Ranger Regiment	
29	Nyopis nak Noyeat	Corporal	1973	Malaysian Army	Malaysian Ranger Regiment	
30	Robert Rizal bin Abdullah	Captain	1973	Malaysian Army	Malaysian Ranger Regiment	
31	Salehuddin bin Abdul Mutalib	Lieutenant	1973	Malaysian Army	Royal Cavalry Corps	
32	Samaon bin Ahmad	Captain	1973	Malaysian Army	Royal Malay Regiment	
33	Abdullah bin Dolmat	2nd Lieutenant	1974	Malaysian Army	Royal Malay Regiment	
34	Md Ali bin Ahmad	Trooper	1974	Malaysian Army	Malaysian Special Service Regiment	
35	Saafar bin Ibrahim	Corporal	1974	Malaysian Army	Royal Malay Regiment	
36	Sigai anak Nawan	Trooper	1974	Malaysian Army	Malaysian Special Service Regiment	
37	Wilfred Gomez Malong	Inspector	1974	Royal Malaysia Police	Border Scouts, Police Field Force	
38	Zaki bin Nordin	Corporal	1974	Malaysian Army	Malaysian Special Service Regiment	
39	Abdul Jalil bin Makmor	2nd Lieutenant	1975	Malaysian Army	Royal Malay Regiment	
40	Abdul Rahim bin Abdul Rahman	Captain	1975	Royal Malaysian Air Force	10 Squadron RMAF	
41	Ahmad bin Abdul Rashid	Captain	1975	Malaysian Army	Intelligence Corps	
42	Arokiasamy Augustine U. Ubagarasamy	Sergeant	1975	Malaysian Army	Malaysian Ranger Regiment	
43	Mahamad Basri bin Din	2nd Lieutenant	1975	Malaysian Army	Engineer Regiment	
44	Mat Isa bin Hassan	Ranger	1975	Malaysian Army	Malaysian Ranger Regiment	
45	Othman bin Ismail	Lance Corporal	1975	Malaysian Army	Royal Malay Regiment	
46	Shanmuganathan Arampoo	Captain	1975	Malaysian Army	Malaysian Ranger Regiment	posthumous
47	Taib bin Awal	Private	1975	Malaysian Army	Royal Malay Regiment	
48	Abdul Kadir bin Mat Jana	Sub-Inspector	1976	Royal Malaysia Police	Police Field Force	
49	Choo Yeok Boo	Captain	1976	Royal Malaysian Air Force	7 Squadron RMAF	posthumous
50	Gui Poh Choon	Chief Inspector	1976	Royal Malaysia Police	Special Investigation Division (D9), Criminal Investigation Department	
51	Basri bin Omar	2nd Lieutenant	1976	Malaysian Army	Engineer Regiment	
52	Kulasingam Sabaratnam	Deputy Superintendent of Police	1976	Royal Malaysia Police	Special Investigation Division (D9), Criminal Investigation Department	
53	Beliang anak Bali	Lance Corporal	1977	Malaysian Army	Malaysian Ranger Regiment	
54	Ielias bin Ibrahim	Private	1977	Malaysian Army	Territorial Army Regiment	
55	Jamaludin bin Suriani	Warrant Officer II	1977	Malaysian Army	Intelligence Corps	
56	Mat Zin bin Mat Yassin	Inspector	1977	Royal Malaysia Police	Special Branch	posthumous
57	Mohamad bin Salim	Constable	1977	Royal Malaysia Police	Police Field Force	
58	Mohd Noh bin Hashim	Constable	1977	Royal Malaysia Police	Police Field Force	
59	Muit bin Ahmad	Sergeant	1977	Malaysian Army	Malaysian Special Service Group	
60	Mohamad H. Piah bin Ali	Lieutenant	1978	Malaysian Army	Royal Malay Regiment	
61	Panirchellvum Velaitham	2nd Lieutenant	1978	Malaysian Army	Malaysian Ranger Regiment	
62	Salihuddin bin Saisi	Corporal	1978	Royal Malaysia Police	Special Branch	
63	Kanang anak Langkau	Sergeant	1980	Malaysian Army	Malaysian Ranger Regiment	
64	Roslan bin A. Rahman	2nd Lieutenant	1980	Malaysian Army	Royal Malay Regiment	
65	Abdullah bin Babu	Major	1981	Malaysian Army	Royal Malay Regiment	
66	Gunasegaran Naidu Ratinum	Inspector	1981	Royal Malaysia Police	Senoi Praaq, Police Field Force	posthumous
67	Ismail bin Haji Ahmad	Lance Corporal	1981	Malaysian Army	Royal Malay Regiment	
68	Long anak Pandak	Corporal	1981	Royal Malaysia Police	Senoi Praaq, Police Field Force	
69	Mohd. Aziz bin Mohd. Yusof	Detective Constable	1981	Royal Malaysia Police	Special Branch	
70	Mohd. Zain bin Mohd. Noh	Sergeant	1981	Malaysian Army	Royal Malay Regiment	
71	Ahmad Radzi bin Mohd Noor	Sergeant	1982	Malaysian Army		
72	Abdul Kamal bin Salleh	Lance Corporal	1983	Malaysian Army	Royal Malay Regiment	
73	Desmond Godfrey Lawrence	Superintendent of Police	1983	Royal Malaysia Police	Special Branch	
74	Tachmi bin Ismail	Corporal	1983	Malaysian Army	Royal Malay Regiment	
75	Micheal Riman anak Bugat	Sergeant	1984	Malaysian Army	Malaysian Ranger Regiment	
76	Mohd Mashkor bin Muradi	Sergeant	1987	Royal Malaysia Police	Special Actions Unit	
77	Nazaruddin bin Mohd Zain	Sergeant	1987	Royal Malaysia Police	Special Actions Unit	
78	Borhan bin Daud	Inspector	1989	Royal Malaysia Police	Special Branch	
79	Voon Ken Hong	Inspector	1989	Royal Malaysia Police	F Team, Special Branch	
80	Ab Aziz bin Ab Latiff	Major	1994	Malaysian Army	Royal Malay Regiment	
81	Khairul Anuar bin Abd Aziz	2nd Lieutenant	1994	Malaysian Army	Royal Malay Regiment	
82	Mohd Halim bin Khalid	Captain	1994	Malaysian Army	Royal Malay Regiment	
83	Mohd Sabri bin Ahmad	Lance Corporal	1994	Malaysian Army	Royal Malay Regiment	
84	Muhammad Juraimy bin Aripin	2nd Lieutenant	1994	Malaysian Army	Royal Malay Regiment	
85	Rizal bin Ismail	Lance Corporal	1994	Malaysian Army	Royal Malay Regiment	
86	Gani anak Binjoi	Sergeant	1995	Malaysian Army	Royal Ranger Regiment	posthumous
87	Suhaidi bin Saad	Lieutenant	1995	Malaysian Army	Royal Malay Regiment	
88	Mohamad bin Baharom	Warrant Officer II	1996	Malaysian Army	Royal Intelligence Corps	
89	Mohd. Noor bin Razak	Acting Assistant Superintendent of Police	1996	Royal Malaysia Police	Jungle Squad 69, Police Field Force	
90	Azman bin Muda	Constable	1997	Royal Malaysia Police	Pandan Indah Police Cottage	
91	Mohd. Zahir bin Mamat	Lance Corporal	1997	Royal Malaysia Police	Pandan Indah Police Cottage	
92	Ada bin Kulim	Lance Corporal	1998	Royal Malaysia Police	VAT 69 Commando	
93	Anuar bin Alias	Commander	2000	Royal Malaysian Navy	Naval Special Force	
94	Mohd Shah bin Ahmad	Detective Sergeant	2001	Royal Malaysia Police	Special Branch	
95	Sagadevan Rajoo	Detective Sergeant	2001	Royal Malaysia Police	Special Branch	posthumous
96	Mathew anak Medan	Corporal	2002	Malaysian Army	21st Special Service Group	posthumous
97	Mohd. Fakaruddin bin Zakaria	Constable	2007	Royal Malaysia Police	General Duty Branch, Semenyih Police Station	posthumous
98	Hisham bin Mahmood	Assistant Superintendent of Police	2012	Royal Malaysia Police	Special Actions Unit	
99	Apot anak Saad	Sergeant Major	2013	Royal Malaysia Police	VAT 69 Commando	
100	Abd. Aziz bin Sarikon	Sergeant Major	2014	Royal Malaysia Police	General Operations Force	posthumous
101	Azman bin Ampong	Corporal	2014	Royal Malaysia Police	VAT 69 Commando	
102	Baharin Bin Hamit	Detective Sergeant Major	2014	Royal Malaysia Police	Special Branch	posthumous
103	Ibrahim bin Lebar	Assistant Commissioner of Police	2014	Royal Malaysia Police	Special Branch	posthumous
104	Michael anak Padel	Deputy Superintendent of Police	2014	Royal Malaysia Police	Special Branch	posthumous
105	Mohd Azrul bin Tukiran	Corporal	2014	Royal Malaysia Police	General Operations Force	posthumous
106	Mohd Salleh bin Abd Razak	Corporal	2014	Royal Malaysia Police	VAT 69 Commando	
107	Mohd Tarmizi bin Hashim	Corporal	2014	Royal Malaysia Police	VAT 69 Commando	
108	Sabarudin bin Daud	Sergeant	2014	Royal Malaysia Police	VAT 69 Commando	posthumous
109	Salam bin Tugiran	Sergeant (S)	2014	Royal Malaysia Police	Transport Branch, Logistics and Technology Department	posthumous
110	Zulkifli bin Mamat	Assistant Superintendent of Police	2014	Royal Malaysia Police	VAT 69 Commando	posthumous
111	Datuk Leong Chee Woh	Senior Assistant Commissioner of Police (Retired)	2017	Royal Malaysia Police	F Team, Special Branch	
112	Md Radzi bin Md Isa	Deputy Superintendent of Police (Retired)	2017	Royal Malaysia Police	VAT 69 Commando	
113	Baharuddin bin Ramli	Sergeant	2021	Royal Malaysia Police	3rd Battalion (Senoi Praaq), General Operations Force	posthumous
114	Norihan bin Tari	Sergeant	2021	Royal Malaysia Police	3rd Battalion (Senoi Praaq), General Operations Force	
115	Mohamad Hasnal bin Jamil	Deputy Superintendent of Police	2023	Royal Malaysia Police	Special Branch	

== Notable recipients ==
=== Baharin Abd Jalil ===
Major (retd) Baharin bin Abd Jalil, (Service number: 410560), was a Platoon Commander in A Company of the 1st Battalion, Malaysian Ranger Regiment (1 RANGER) at the time. He was a Leftenan Muda ('2nd Lieutenant') at the time. In Operation Hentam, he was tasked with conducting blocks in various locations around Kampung Goebilt, Sarawak. Blocks are positions where a unit, the anvil, acts as a stopping force. The pursuing force, the hammer, would fire-fight the enemy into the anvil, where it would be efficiently decimated. In jungle warfare, the "Hammer and Anvil" tactic is widely used.

Two Communist terrorists met the villagers of Kampung Goebilt on 12 March 1971, to obtain food supplies. The villagers obliged by providing them with food, and the members of the 1 RANGER were quickly informed. As a result, one of the food-collecting terrorists was apprehended. Baharin divided his platoon into small groups after gathering more information. He joined forces with Ranger Lan Gima. These two were successful in detecting a group of enemies. The enemy group was estimated to number around ten people. They were successful in making contact with the enemy.

In a fierce moving gunfight, these two formidable characters engaged the enemy. Baharin and Lan Gima killed 13 of the enemy themselves. The King awarded the PGB to 2Lt Baharin bin Abd Jalil for valour in the highest Ranger Corps traditions. He left the military with the rank of Major.

=== David Fu Chee Ming ===
Captain (retd) David Fu Chee Ming, (b. 1945; Service number: 200772), was the Platoon Commander of the 8th Platoon of C Company, 4th Battalion, Malaysian Ranger Regiment at the time. He was tasked with tracking and destroying the enemy in his sector of operation in the Tanah Hitam area of Perak. He was a Leftenan Muda ('2nd Lieutenant') at the time.

On 27 August 1970, his platoon of 24 men came into contact with a group of approximately 70 enemy combatants. The enemy had accidentally entered his sector. Thus began a 7-hour-long heavy and intense battle. The men fought on under his unwavering leadership, killing four of the enemy. There were no casualties on his patrol.

The King awarded him the PGB for his outstanding gallantry and bravery in the finest traditions of the Ranger Corps. He retired as a Captain after a distinguished career.

=== Ielias Ibrahim ===
Warrant Officer Class 1 (retd) Ielias bin Ibrahim is the only PGB recipient from the Malaysian Army's reserve unit, the Territorial Army Regiment. Ielias retired as Regimental Sergeant Major of the Reserve Officer Training Unit at Universiti Sains Malaysia.

=== Ismail Salleh ===
Colonel (retd) Ismail Salleh, (Service number: 12171), then Company Commander of the 6th Battalion, Malaysian Ranger Regiment, was tasked with carrying out Operation Badak in the Pelam Estate area of Klian Intan, Perak. He held the rank of Mejar ('Major') at the time. This operation was launched in response to intelligence that a group of enemy infiltrators had infiltrated the area via the Thai-Malaysian border.

Ismail, along with Platoons 8 and 9, entered the area of operation around 3 a.m. on 23 August 1970, with the intention of blocking enemy infiltrators. Platoon 8 made contact with the enemy's forward elements around 4 p.m. on the same day. Four of the enemy were killed in a brief and fierce firefight. As a result, the enemy staged a withdrawal. The enemy launched a counterattack against Platoon 8 after a few minutes. At the same time, Ismail and Platoon 9 were targeted by another enemy group. The Battalion's HQ at Klian Intan Camp requested artillery support. Ismail and his group were able to surround the enemy while waiting for the requested artillery support. In this position, he and his group exchanged fire with the enemy, killing one and wounding several others. As artillery fire rained down on the enemy, he ordered his men to keep firing on the encircled enemies. The enemy was estimated to number around 70 people and to be armed with automatic weapons and high explosives.

The fight lasted seven hours. His Majesty the King bestowed the PGB on Major Ismail bin Salleh for his bravery in the face of the enemy. He left the military with the rank of Colonel.

=== Kanang Langkau ===
Warrant Officer Class 1 (retd) Temenggung Datuk Kanang anak Langkau, SP PGB PGBK PBS, (b. 1945; d. 2013; Service number: 901738), of Simanggang, Sarawak, was a Malaysian soldier from the 8th Battalion, Malaysian Ranger Regiment (today known as the 8th Battalion (Parachute), Royal Ranger Regiment) who was awarded the Seri Pahlawan Gagah Perkasa. He is the only person in the Malaysian Armed Forces to have received two of the highest gallantry awards.

On 21 April 1962, he enlisted in the British Army as an Iban Tracker with the Sarawak Rangers. After Malaysia was established, he was absorbed into the Malaysian Rangers. He retired from the military after 21 years of service as a Warrant Officer Class 1.

On the 1st of June 1979, while on a reconnaissance mission in the Korbu Forest Reserve (Fort Legap), he came across an enemy camp and attacked it against forces that outnumbered his own. As a result of the encounter, two rangers and five enemies were killed. Enemy equipment was also confiscated. He was awarded the "Pingat Gagah Berani" for his actions.

=== Lan Gima ===
Ranger Lan anak Gima (Service number: 901111) served in the 1 RANGER. During Operation Hentam on 12 March 1971, he joined 2nd Lieutenant Baharin Abd Jalil on a manhunt mission. These two were able to detect a group of enemies numbering in the tens. They started the firefight and engaged in a fierce moving firefight with the enemy. Baharin and Lan Gima killed 13 enemies between them. The PGB was bestowed by the King on Ranger Lan anak Gima.

=== Mohd Ghazali Che Mat ===
General (retd) Tan Sri Mohd Ghazali bin Haji Che Mat was one of the first four recipients of the award. The four soldiers received the award on Malaysian Independence Day, two years before the award was officially gazetted by the Malaysian government. Mohd Ghazali, then Leftenan Muda ('2nd Lieutenant'), led Platoon 1 from A Company, 2nd Battalion, Malay Regiment on a routine patrol on 13 November 1957. The platoon notices an enemy platoon on top of a hill. Platoon 1 was spotted by the enemy while climbing the hill to set up an ambush and was pinned down by enemy shots from the top of the hill. Mohd Ghazali and one of his platoon members, Private Hassan Selati, decide to do a suicide charge towards the enemy's position after being unable to move for a long time, and they manage to kill two of the enemy. The enemy withdrew from their position after being surprised by the supposedly final charge from the two brave men, and Platoon 1 survived the firefight. The enemy platoon was later identified as the 37th/39th Liberation Platoon of the 5th Malayan Communist Party Regiment. Mohd Ghazali was appointed as the 8th Chief of the Defence Forces on 1 November 1985.

=== Voon Ken Hong ===
Chief Inspector (retd) Voon Ken Hong was a Malaysian intelligence police officer and Special Branch secret agent who participated in Operation Taloong during the Communist insurgency in Malaysia (1968–89). Voon retired from the service as a Chief Inspector in 1997.
