= Amri Che Mat =

Malaysian social activist; abducted

- Born: Malaysia
- Disappeared: 24 November 2016; Perlis, Malaysia
- Status: Missing for 9 years, 2 months and 19 days
- Occupation: Social activist
- Known for: Abduction and disappearance
- Spouse: Noorhayati Mohd Ariffin

Amri Che Mat is a Malaysian social activist from Perlis, Malaysia, who was abducted on 24 November 2016. He was one of a number of social activists who have gone missing during the same time period, including pastors Raymond Koh and Joshua Hilmy, the latter of whom disappeared along with his wife, Ruth.

== Background ==
The then Leader of the Opposition Wan Azizah Wan Ismail, compared Amri's abduction to that of Raymond, and asked police to explain why Amri's wife and children have been kept in the dark about his disappearance.

Following the Human Rights Commission of Malaysia's (SUHAKAM) announcement that its findings concluded that the Royal Malaysian Police's Special Branch was responsible for the disappearances of Amri and Raymond, and still missing as of 2019, Deputy Inspector-General of Police Abdul Hamid Bador criticized SUHAKAM, claiming that the report negatively impacted the Royal Malaysian Police (PDRM). and added that he was confident that the Inspector-General of Police (IGP) Mohamad Fuzi Harun, who was Special Branch Director at the time of the disappearances, would provide an answer to the allegations. Former Prime Minister of Malaysia Mahathir Mohamad announced on the same day that fresh investigations would be conducted once Mohamad Fuzi retires in May 2019.

In 2020, it was said that Amri's disappearance as well as that of Koh were the subject of an inquiry by SUHAKAM. Liew, who is Koh's wife, is suing senior members of the Malaysian police and her stand has been recognized by the US Secretary of State.

== See also ==
- List of kidnappings
- List of people who disappeared mysteriously (2000–present)
