= General Operations Force =

Malaysian paramilitary unit

- Pasukan Gerakan Am
- Active: 1 August 1948 : Jungle Squad; 1963 : Police Field Force; 1997–present : General Operations Force
- Country: British Malaya (1948–1957); Malaya (1948—1963); Malaysia (1963–present)
- Branch: Royal Malaysia Police
- Type: Paramilitary, Light infantry, Gendarmerie
- Role: Domestic counter-insurgency, counter-terrorism, multi-security service, VIPs Close Protection, Border Patrol and law enforcement
- Size: 12,000 Personnel (Feb 2014): Light infantry (20 battalions); Armored squadrons (six squadrons); Special platoon (one platoon)
- Part of: Internal Security and Public Order Department
- Garrison/HQ: Training Centre: Ulu Kinta, Ipoh, Perak
- Nicknames: Polis Hutan (Jungle Squad lit. Jungle Police)
- Mottos: "Cekal, Berani, Setia" ("Gallant, Brave, Loyal")
- Colour of Beret: Dark blue - Standard light infantry Maroon - Senoi Praaq: (Both of GOF berets with yellow liner at beret insignia)
- Anniversaries: March 25 (Police Day); August 31 (Independence Day)
- Engagements: Malayan Emergency 1948-1960; Indonesia–Malaysia confrontation Communist insurgency in Malaysia (1968–89); 13 May Incident; Reformation Raid; Ops Fire Palm 2 UNMIT; 2013 Lahad Datu standoff

The General Operations Force (Malay: Pasukan Gerakan Am; PGA, Jawi: ڤاسوكن ڬرقن عام) is the light infantry arm of the Royal Malaysia Police. The General Operations Force was established in 1948 during the Malayan Emergency by the British Administration when Malaya was a colony. The police service was mobilised to the field role, primarily to engaging Communist guerrillas during the emerging Insurgency. When Malaysia was formed in 1963, this law enforcement unit was then known as the Police Field Force (Malay: Pasukan Medan Polis; PMP). The title was adopted when it dropped the previous handle widely referred to as the Jungle Squad (Malay: Pasukan Polis Hutan; PPH).

== History ==
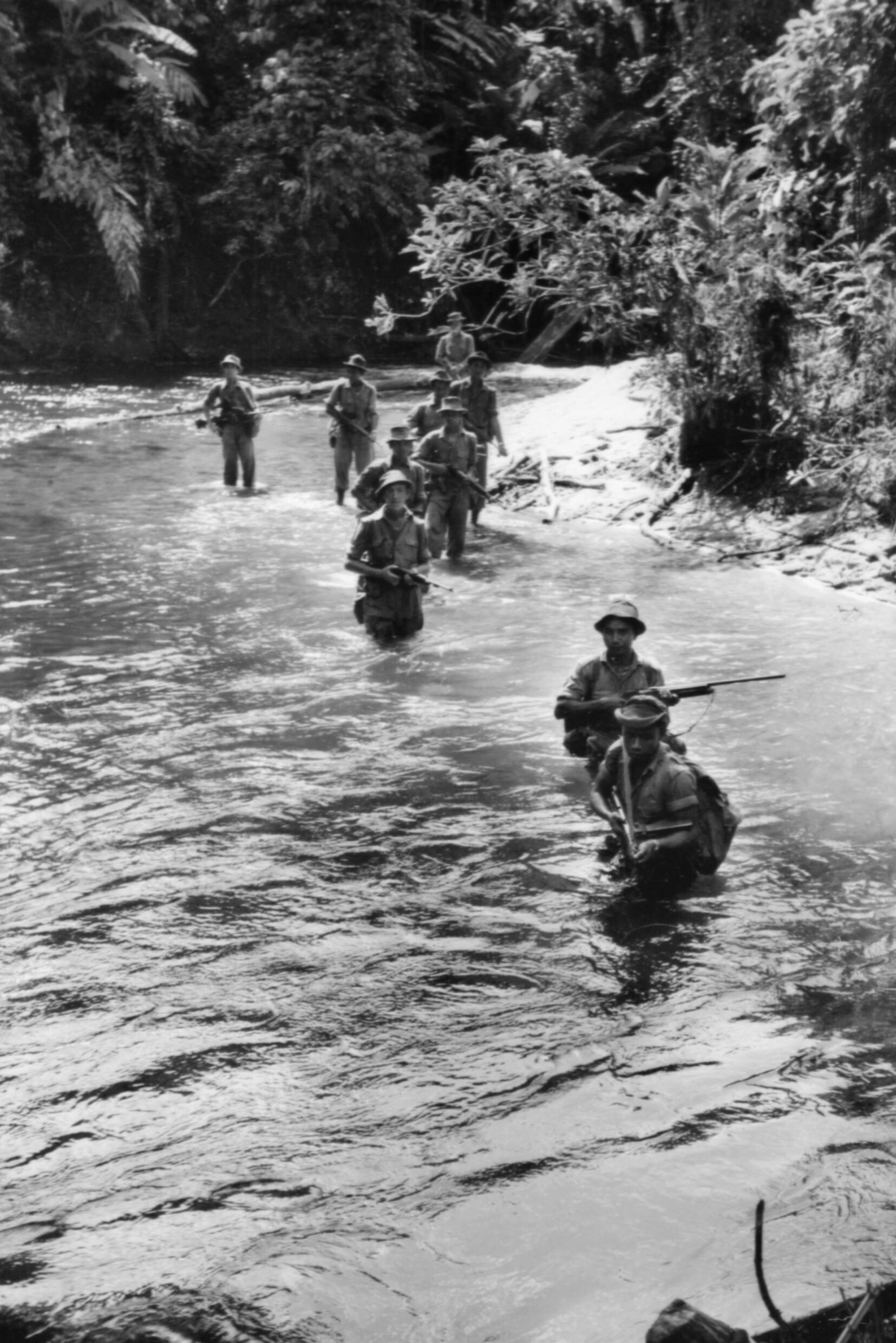
The Police Jungle Squad officers during a jungle patrol.

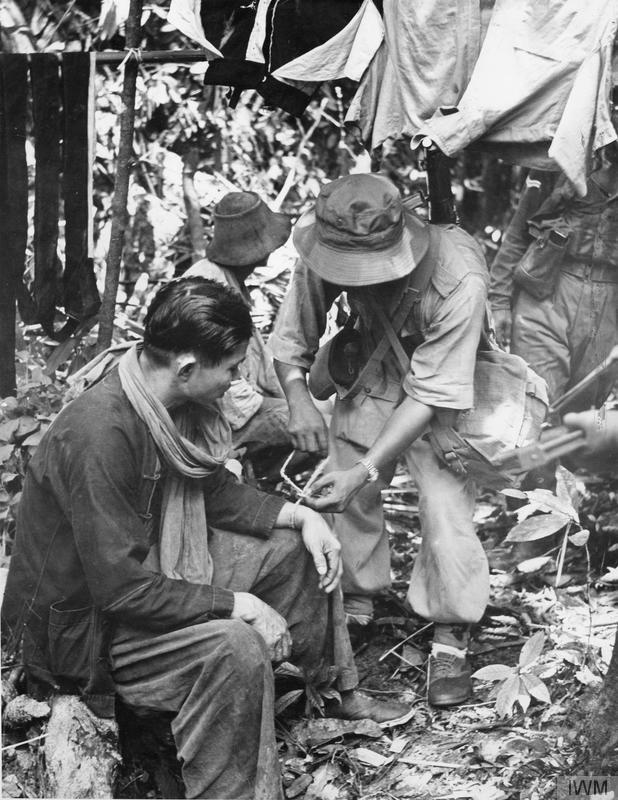
Two communist guerillas after captured by Jungle Squad officers from their communist camp in the jungle.

The Jungle Squad was based on the Malay States Guides (Malay: Pasukan Pengawal Negeri-negeri Melayu Bersekutu) which was formed in 1826. The Malay States Guides was a paramilitary force with an initial strength of 900 members and was led by R. S. F. Walker as its first commandant. The regiment was involved in World War I and together with Field Force Aden, they fought Ottoman forces in the Southwest of South Arabia (now Saudi Arabia) for five years. The regiment was disbanded for reasons of economy in 1919.

The British Military Administration (BMA) had mobilised the police General Duties to assume the role of the military effort against the insurgencies. The Jungle Squad was established in 1948 for that purpose against communist terrorists. Initially the new police arm was called the Flying Squad. However, it was renamed the "Jungle Squad" in the line with its major role against communist terrorists in the forest. In 1951, the Jungle Squad restructured and became known as "Jungle Company". In 1953, the Jungle Company continued to be augmented and became known by the name Police Field Force (Malay: Pasukan Polis Hutan (PPH)). It was under the command of the Police Commissioner of the Federation of Malaya and later when Malaysia was established it was placed under the Chief of Police. The Jungle Company was then deployed together with the British Army to infiltrate and track down communist insurgents operating in the jungles of Malaya. The strength of a single platoon then consisted of a mixture of 15 personnel led by a Lance Corporal to an Inspector. Over the period covering the Malayan Emergency (1948–1960) the Police Field Force suffered over 1,000 casualties.

The Police Field Force was also involved during the Indonesia-Malaysia confrontations. In various actions during the Confrontation, the Police Field Force detained Indonesian irregulars sent to the peninsula, with the view of running clandestine operations on Malaysian soil. Following the May 13, 1969 incident, the Malaysian government realised the importance of a mobile and independent team and more capable to the facing of public order situations.

Following the disarmament of the Malayan Communist Party (MCP) on 2 December 1989, the Police Field Force was reformed with attenuation from 21 battalions to 17 battalions on 1 September 1994. PPH changed its name to the General Operations Force (PGA) on 20 October 1997. On 11 November 1997, the submission of the RMP pennants ceremony was officiated by the King of Malaysia. This change of name in accordance with the rating duties GOF background itself. Prior to this duties in GOF associated with the forest for combating the communist threats. After the communists disarmed on 2 December 1989, GOF tasks changed in that scenarios became more varied.

== Organisations ==
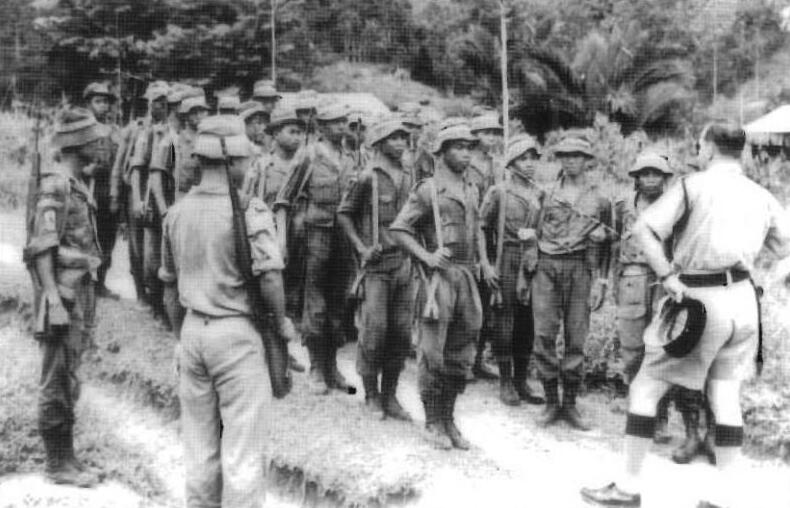
Men from the indigenous tribes of Sabah and Sarawak were recruited by the Malaysian government as Border Scouts under the command of Richard Noone and other officers from the Senoi Praaq.

Prior to 1997, besides the regular Jungle Squad, there were a few specialised units attached to Police Field Forces:

- Commando Force; "PPH 69" (Jungle Squad 69)
- Senoi Praaq Force
- Border Scouts (Malay: Pasukan Pengakap Sempadan) (for Sabah and Sarawak)
- Unit Kawalan Kawasan (UKK) (Area Control Unit)
- Unit Pencegah Penyeludupan (UPP) (Anti-Smuggling Unit)

After GOF restructuring, the Jungle Squad 69 was separated into a new police command while Senoi Praaq was absorbed into GOF and renamed to 'GOF 3rd Battalion'. Border Scouts and UKK were disbanded and its members absorbed into the GOF battalions and regular police forces. UPP was then formed into a federal agency whose members are drawn from the Royal Malaysian Police, Royal Malaysian Customs and Immigration Department of Malaysia. The UPP later renamed to Agensi Keselamatan Sempadan (Border Security Agency) in 2015.

At present, the Royal Malaysia Police General Operations Force is organised along military lines consisting of brigades, battalions, companies, platoons and sections deployed where needed.

=== GOF brigades ===
There are currently five brigades located in both Peninsular Malaysia and East Malaysia and every brigade is headed by those ranked Senior Assistant Commissioner (SAC) or above. The five GOF brigades are:

1. GOF Northern Brigade; based in Ulu Kinta, Perak - led by SAC (vacant)
2. GOF Central Brigade; based in Cheras, Kuala Lumpur - led by SAC Awang Arfian Awang Bujang
3. GOF Southeast Brigade; based in Kuantan, Pahang - led by SAC Ahmad Radzi Hussain
4. GOF Sarawak Brigade; based in Kuching, Sarawak - led by SAC Lim Bak Phai
5. GOF Sabah Brigade; based in Kota Kinabalu, Sabah - led by SAC Nor Omar Sappi

The number of GOF battalions under the command of GOF brigades varies based on local needs. The Central and Sabah Brigades are composed of five battalions each. The Northern Brigade contains four battalions while the Southeast and Sarawak Brigades are composed of three battalions each.

=== GOF battalions ===
GOF has a strength of 20 battalions located in both Peninsular Malaysia and East Malaysia with each commanded by a Police Superintendent. Each battalion consists of about three infantry companies and one mortar platoon.

=== Senoi Praaq ===
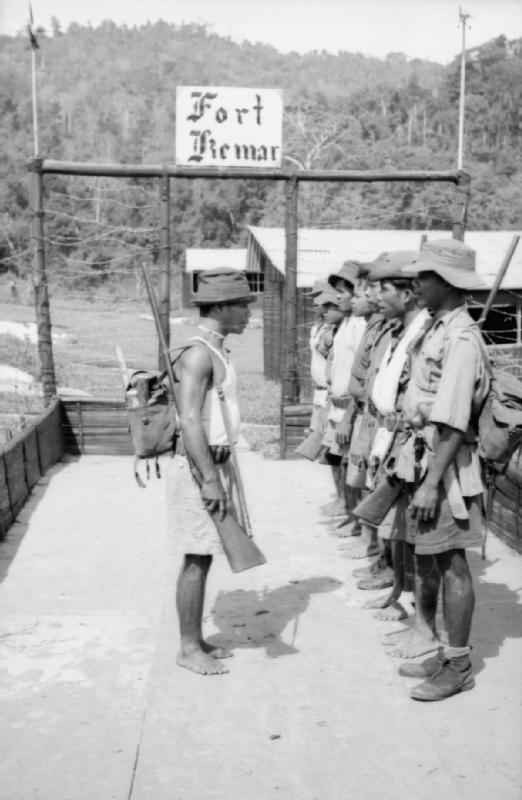
Members of the Senoi Praaq in 1953.

Senoi Praaq means War People in the language of the Semai Indigenous people of Peninsula Malaysia. The formation was moved to the Police Field Force in 1968 and increased to two battalions. The Senoi Praaq were established in 1957 employed with tracking and security roles, apart from performing the main function of contact with the aborigines peoples. Manned by aborigines of Peninsular Malaysia that were skilled in jungle tracking, it was successful in engaging the communist terrorists during the Malayan Emergency. The Senoi Praaq can be distinguished from other mainline GOF battalions by the use of the distinctive maroon beret and red hackle.

=== Tiger Platoons ===
With the separation of 69 Commando, which is now part of the Pasukan Gerakan Khas (Special Operations Command; SOCOM), the General Operations Force Command established new versatile units with Special Operations capability to operate in all GOF brigades. These elite platoons were formed for special assignments, covert and overt operations and Search And Rescue (SAR), and are known generally as the Tiger Platoons.

Tiger Platoons from GOF Sabah and Sarawak Brigades actively operates as the region's main special operations forces as both states are located far from Pasukan Gerakan Khas Headquarters.

== GOF roles ==
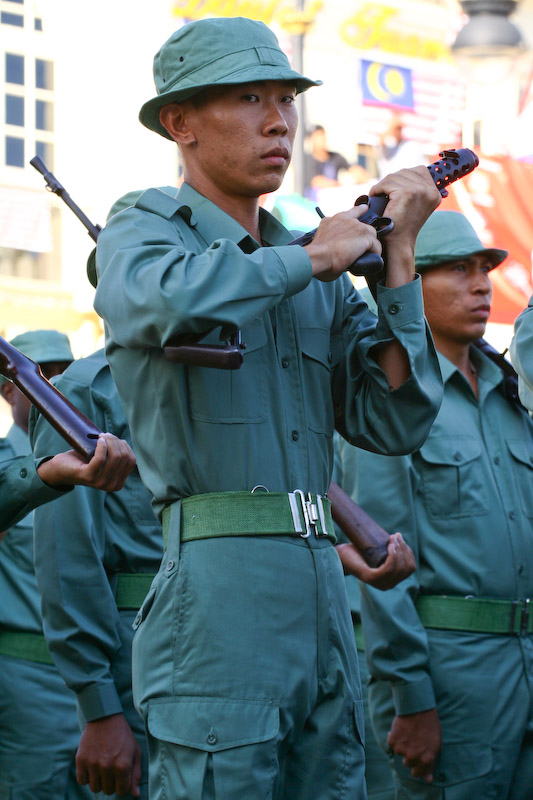
GOF officer worn their old Jungle Squad era uniform with Sterling L2A3 (Mk.4) submachine gun during 50th Independence Day Parade.

The General Operations Force are deployed, equipped and trained for specified roles in times of peace and during emergencies. The various roles include neutralising armed criminals, border patrols, counter terrorism, anti piracy and maritime security. The GOF also assists in general duties such as public security, close quarters combat in urban settings and anti smuggling patrols. In times of conflict or emergency, GOF brigades are used primarily for assigned duties in counter-terrorism and anti - guerrilla warfare. A brigade is essentially trained, equipped and organised for paramilitary roles in the field and also for insertion in major urban conurbations. All personnel are drawn from mainline Police Training Schools and inducted to GOF Training Centres, with the view of completing the study of anti guerrilla warfare and military training courses before graduating to GOF Battalions. Where borders are perilously dangerous, GOF units are deployed in localised security sweeps and defence operations. The GOF also employs units in riots and disturbances where necessary.

== Training ==
The first Training Centre was based at Sik, Kedah in 1949. Successful candidates trained there were sent on to the Police Field Force. Another School for the Police Field Force was opened in Sungai Buloh, Selangor with the aim of conducting basic training and refresher courses. In 1953, one new training centre was established in Dusun Tua, Hulu Langat, Selangor renamed the Jungle Squad Training Centre (Malay: Sekolah Latihan Pasukan Polis Hutan; SLPPH). In year 1964, the SLPPH was transferred to Kroh, Perak following the closure of the first two centres. The training centre itself was transferred again to Kentonmen, Ulu Kinta, Perak. In 1997, the training centre is renamed to Sekolah Latihan Pasukan Gerakan Am, SLPGA (English: General Operations Forces Training School) in line with the change of name of the Police Field Force to current Pasukan Gerakan Am (English: General Operations Force). On 22 September 2006, the training centre once again change its name to Pusat Latihan PGA (PLPGA) (English: GOF Training Centre).

It is a must for GOF police officers to enter the GOF Basic Course (Malay: Kursus Asas PGA). The course last for 14 weeks and they together with Senoi Praaq trainees need to attend Public Order Reserve Unit (PORU) (Malay: Latihan Polis Anti Rusuhan) before they can graduate.

The modules of the GOF Basic Course are:

- Physical Training
- Weapon Training
- Field Skills Module
- Combat Skills Module
- Operation Techniques Module
- Intelligence Module
- Counter-insurgency Module
- Conventional Warfare Module
- Public Order Module
- Public Policy Module

To enter the elite Senoi Praaq Battalions, Malaysian aboriginal needs to enter Orang Asli Constable Basic Course (Malay: Kursus Asas Konstabel Orang Asli) which last for six months. This course is a collaborations between the RMP and Department of Orang Asli Development.

== Headquarters ==
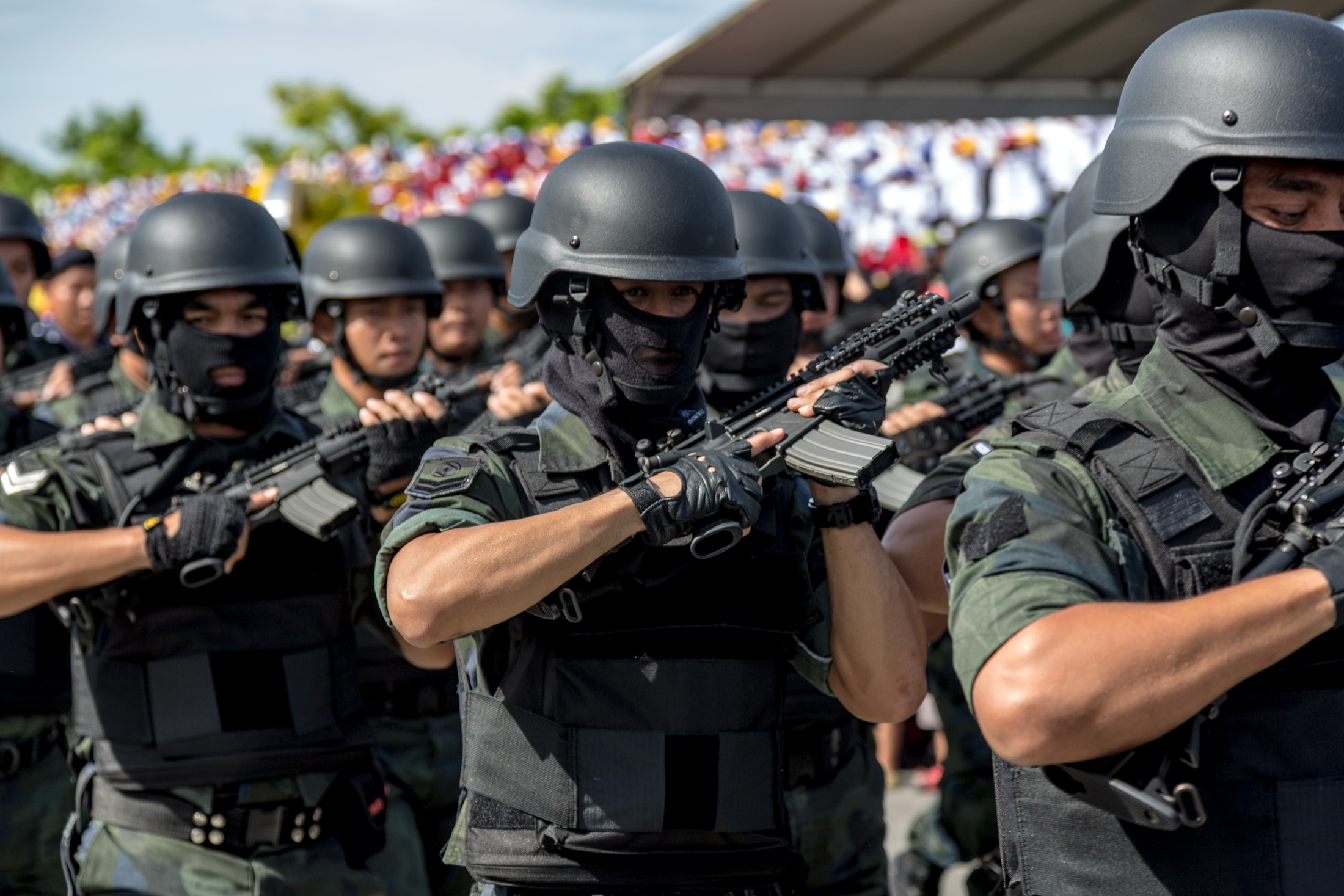
Officers of Tiger Platoon in parade.

List of GOF Battalions and theirs Headquarters (update latest for 2026)
Battalion	Speciality	Headquarters	Commanding Officer (CO)
GOF 1st Battalion		Ulu Kinta, Ipoh, Perak	Supt Oi Jing Bing
GOF 2nd Battalion		Kulim, Kedah	P/Supt Aswadi Seman
GOF 3rd Battalion (Senoi Praaq)	Special Trackers	Bidor, Perak	Vacant
GOF 4th Battalion		Semenyih, Hulu Langat, Selangor	Supt Amanjit Singh
GOF 5th Battalion		Simpang Renggam, Johor	Supt Salehin Soleiman
GOF 6th Battalion		Bakri, Muar, Johor	Supt Shoaimi Ismail
GOF 7th Battalion		Bukit Galing, Kuantan, Pahang	Supt Davidson Tanggapan
GOF 8th Battalion		Pengkalan Chepa, Kelantan	Supt Mohd Khairi Abdullah
GOF 9th Battalion		Kubang Badak, Kuala Terengganu, Terengganu	Supt Mannadzar Nasib
GOF 10th Battalion		Sibu, Sarawak	Supt Yusuf Baki Khan
GOF 11th Battalion		Bukit Kawa, Kuching, Sarawak	Supt Ku Majidin Che Jusoh
GOF 12th Battalion		Miri, Sarawak	Supt Mazlan Mohamed
GOF 14th Battalion		Tawau, Sabah	Supt Anselius Marcus
GOF 15th Battalion		Sandakan, Sabah	Supt Raji Hussin Suhodin
GOF 16th Battalion		Kota Kinabalu, Sabah (Kinarut, Papar)	Supt Jaswent Singh Sadu Singh
GOF 17th Battalion		Lahad Datu, Sabah	Supt Victor Cardona
GOF 18th Battalion (Senoi Praaq)	Special Trackers	Pengkalan Hulu, Perak	Supt Raja Hafiz Bin Raja Razak
GOF 19th Battalion	Area Security of VVIP	Cheras, Kuala Lumpur	ACP Rajab Ahad Ismail
GOF 20th Battalion	ESSZONE Security	Beluran, Sabah	Supt Mohd Yusoff Daud
GOF 21st Battalion		Keningau, Sabah	P/Supt Hairulnizam Rashid
Tiger Platoon	Special Operations Capable	Every GOF Brigades Headquarters	

The GOF battalions will be assisted by armoured car from:

1. 1st Armored Squadron Kulim, Kedah
2. 3rd Armored Squadron Ulu Kinta, Perak
3. 5th Armored Squadron Cheras, Kuala Lumpur
4. 7th Armored Squadron Bakri, Muar, Johor
5. 9th Armored Squadron Kuantan, Pahang
6. 11th Armored Squadron Kuching, Sarawak

== Current task ==
The Police GOF was successful in dealing with the armed rebellion led by the communist terrorists in Malaysia. Today the roles of the General Operations Force includes border and maritime security, anti piracy patrols, counter-terrorism, public security, search and rescue (SAR) and organised crime.

On 20 October 1997, the Police Field Force letterhead was changed to the new title; the General Operations Force or Pasukan Gerakan Am composed of 17 battalions organised in five brigades, deployed in both Peninsular Malaysia and East Malaysia.

In June 2004, one specialised battalion was tasked for VVIP security. It is the GOF 19th Battalion, based in Cheras, Kuala Lumpur.

In 2008, the GOF 20th Battalion was established and tasked specifically for airport special security in KLIA. The battalion then renamed to GOF KLIA Special Battalion.

In February 2014, after the Lahad Datu standoff, Malaysian Prime Minister Najib Razak agrees to establish a new GOF brigade task to control Eastern Sabah Security Zone (ESSZONE). The new brigade is named GOF 20th Battalion.

== Future plans ==
Royal Malaysian Police wishes to add another GOF Battalion based in Kunak, Sabah to provide security to ESSZONE and will be known as 21st Battalion. With this addition, the Sabah Brigade will be split into two different brigades which is Northern Sabah Brigade and Eastern Sabah Brigade.

== Killed in the line of duty ==
Rank/No.	Name	Date	Notes
PC 11483	Mohd Taib	1948-08-15	Killed during an ambush in Pahang
Insp I/530	Kartar Singh	1949-07-12	Killed in a firefight with the communists on duty near Rawang
Sgt	(unnamed)	1949-07-12	Killed in a firefight with the communists on duty near Rawang
PC	(unnamed)	1949-07-12	Killed in a firefight with the communists on duty near Rawang
PC	(unnamed)	1949-07-12	Killed in a firefight with the communists on duty near Rawang
PC	(unnamed)	1949-07-12	Killed in a firefight with the communists on duty near Rawang
PC	(unnamed)	1949-07-12	Killed in a firefight with the communists on duty near Rawang
PC	(unnamed)	1949-07-12	Killed in a firefight with the communists on duty near Rawang
PC	(unnamed)	1949-07-12	Killed in a firefight with the communists on duty near Rawang
ASP (C)	D. Hope	1949-12-12	At Jelebu Police Station, Negeri Sembilan, Police Sgt Jock Lovie joined the convoy of three Police trucks, containing a jungle Platoon consisting of E/Sgt D.J. Aylott, ASP (C) D.Hope, including 14 Malay policemen. Jock climbed into the front seat of the second truck. The trucks were not armoured and therefore, vulnerable if involved in an ambush. They left the Police Station roughly about mid morning and headed off in the direction of Seremban. When approaching a section of the winding road over the north–south mountain range. About halfway up the hill, the second truck, had some minor engine trouble and was overtaken by the third truck. The three trucks were almost at the top of the hill, where the banks were at least 10 foot high above the road. It was then that hell broke loose. A fusillade of gunfire rained down on the three trucks, killing and wounding many of the policemen. Jock immediately jumped from his truck and began firing towards the communist gunmen in their ambush position. Unfortunately, a stray bullet hit his carbine taking off the foresight. Nevertheless, he still continued to engage with the enemy. At this stage he was wounded in the hand, unable to fight with his carbine, instead lobbed a grenade in the direction of the communist gunmen. the grenade hit the top of the bank and rolled back. As he went over the bank, he was hit by five bullets, slowing him down totally. The communist gunmen now had control of the ambush position. When the firing stopped, the communist gunmen began throwing dead and wounded bodies onto the trucks. Before setting them ablaze, Jock could hear the communist gunmen calling out to each other to find the remainder of the live survivors. Jock moved his position beginning a hide and seek tactic. After about an hour of his movements, he came across another European Sergeant and a Malay. The three did not realise at that time, they were the only remaining survivors. The option was to stay put, if cornered fight it out. However, the communist gunmen left after their grisly work had been done. It was nearing twilight when the three decided to return to the road to find Army and Police personnel clearing up the massacre. The three were very quickly taken to the hospital in Seremban.
E/Sgt	D.J. Aylott	1949-12-12	
PC 6402	Othman Bin Ahmad	1949-12-12	
PC 10841	Amin Bin Mohd Noor	1949-12-12	
PC 11219	Hassan Bin Mahmud	1949-12-12	
PC 11223	Awang Bin Muda	1949-12-12	
PC 10170	Abd Rashid Bin Jaafar	1949-12-12	
PC 3808	Hussein Bin Kasman	1949-12-12	
PC 9298	Ismail Bin Ibrahim	1949-12-12	
TPC 2077	Baharudin Bin Keling	1949-12-12	
TPC 12964	Abdullah Bin Yahya	1949-12-12	
TPC 12565	Abd Rahman Bin Kelom Mohd Jibin	1949-12-12	
TPC 12246	Zainal Abidin Bin Haji Ibrahim	1949-12-12	
TPC 12530	Idris Bin Kassim	1949-12-12	
TPC 2413	Mion Bin Nasir	1949-12-12	
Sgt 1541	Abu Bakar Bin Ali	1950-01-06	Killed during a firefight with communist gunmen in jungles surrounding Batu Gajah, Perak
E/Sgt	F.R Young	1950-01-22	Ambushed by Communist gunmen at Seberang Prai, Penang
PC 12085	Hanasi Bin Ahmad	1950-01-22	Ambushed by Communist gunmen at Seberang Prai, Penang
PC 1917	Othman Bin Haji Omar	1950-01-22	Ambushed by Communist gunmen at Seberang Prai, Penang
PC 192	Abd Rahman Bin Wahab	1950-01-22	Ambushed by Communist gunmen at Seberang Prai, Penang
PC 12051	Mohd Sohar Bin Abdul Ghani	1950-01-22	Ambushed by Communist gunmen at Seberang Prai, Penang
PC 12894	Johari Bin Mohd	1950-01-22	Ambushed by Communist gunmen at Seberang Prai, Penang
PC 2345	Mohd Shariff Bin Suleiman	1950-01-22	Ambushed by Communist gunmen at Seberang Prai, Penang
EPC 1626	Abdul Hamid Bin Nair	1950-01-22	Ambushed by Communist gunmen at Seberang Prai, Penang
SC 1638	Yeoh Chew Bhik	1950-01-22	Ambushed by Communist gunmen at Seberang Prai, Penang
ASP	V.H Franks	1952-03-11	Killed in a gunfight in jungle of Kulim, Kedah
PC 16772	Karim Bin Tahir	1952-03-11	Killed in a gunfight in jungle of Kulim, Kedah
PC 18692	Hassan Basari Bin Endut	1952-03-11	Killed in a gunfight in jungle of Kulim, Kedah
PC 12259	Jamaluddin Bin Said	1964-02-21	Ambushed by Indonesian guerillas at observation post at Bau, Kuching, Sarawak, during the Indonesia–Malaysia confrontation.
PC 28240	Abd Majid Bin Rahim	1964-02-21	Ambushed by Indonesian guerillas at observation post at Bau, Kuching, Sarawak, during the Indonesia–Malaysia confrontation.
PC 1479	Abdullah Bin Muhammad	1968-06-17	Killed in an ambush during an operation in Bukit Berapit, Perak, as a result of the Indonesia–Malaysia confrontation.
PC 1509	Loh Ah Chu	1968-06-17	Killed in an ambush during an operation in Bukit Berapit, Perak, as a result of the Indonesia–Malaysia confrontation.
PC 8365	Jalil Bin Bachik	1968-06-17	Killed in an ambush during an operation in Bukit Berapit, Perak, as a result of the Indonesia–Malaysia confrontation.
PC 11401	Ismail Bin Mat Sidi	1968-06-17	Killed in an ambush during an operation in Bukit Berapit, Perak, as a result of the Indonesia–Malaysia confrontation.
PC 14892	Nizan Bin Mohd Adam	1968-06-17	Killed in an ambush during an operation in Bukit Berapit, Perak, as a result of the Indonesia–Malaysia confrontation.
PC 19839	Abdul Gahani Bin Mohd	1968-06-17	Killed in an ambush during an operation in Bukit Berapit, Perak, as a result of the Indonesia–Malaysia confrontation.
PC 20239	Abdul Hamid Bin Bakar	1968-06-17	Killed in an ambush during an operation in Bukit Berapit, Perak, as a result of the Indonesia–Malaysia confrontation.
PC 23086	Chan Eng Teck	1968-06-17	Killed in an ambush during an operation in Bukit Berapit, Perak, as a result of the Indonesia–Malaysia confrontation.
PC 24008	Mustapha Bin Hussein	1968-06-17	Killed in an ambush during an operation in Bukit Berapit, Perak, as a result of the Indonesia–Malaysia confrontation.
PC 24827	Mohamad Bin Othman	1968-06-17	Killed in an ambush during an operation in Bukit Berapit, Perak, as a result of the Indonesia–Malaysia confrontation.
PC 25200	Hashim Bin Ismail	1968-06-17	Killed in an ambush during an operation in Bukit Berapit, Perak, as a result of the Indonesia–Malaysia confrontation.
PC 25700	Abdullah Bin Ismail	1968-06-17	Killed in an ambush during an operation in Bukit Berapit, Perak, as a result of the Indonesia–Malaysia confrontation.
PC 30449	Ang Lock Say	1968-06-17	Killed in an ambush during an operation in Bukit Berapit, Perak, as a result of the Indonesia–Malaysia confrontation.
PC 30758	Mohd Salleh Bin Abidin	1968-06-17	Killed in an ambush during an operation in Bukit Berapit, Perak, as a result of the Indonesia–Malaysia confrontation.
PC 30833	Ismail Bin Amir	1968-06-17	Killed in an ambush during an operation in Bukit Berapit, Perak, as a result of the Indonesia–Malaysia confrontation.
PC 40281	Abdul Ghani Bin Daud	1968-06-17	Killed in an ambush during an operation in Bukit Berapit, Perak, as a result of the Indonesia–Malaysia confrontation.
PC 29987	Abu Bakar Bin Ngah Wahab	1968-08-16	Killed during Operation near Sountern Thailand
PC 46737	Abd Jabar bin Othman	1970-02-10	Killed in ambush during Operation Sawadee Salam at Malaysia-Thai border
PC 16874	Bujang @ Malik Bin Sintal	1971-05-26	Killed during Operation Paradom in Sibu, Sarawak
PC 50053	Faridon Bin Abdul Ghani	1971-07-19	Killed during Operation Selamat Sawadi Salam in Thailand
PC 51183	Rani Bin Harun	1971-08-08	Killed in ambush during Operation Ngayau at Sarawak
PC 29964	Jurit bin Kida	1971-09-08	Killed in ambush during Operation Ngayau at Sarawak
PC 52333	Razali Bin Puteh	1971-11-07	Killed in ambush during Operation Ngayau at Sarawak
PC 49986	Raut bin Ismail	1972-07-10	Killed in Operation Ukur at Thailand border
PC 51458	Yahya bin Hassan	1973-02-08	Killed in Operation Amok in Sawah Raja, Negeri Sembilan
PC 51437	Roslan Bin Yahaya	1973-02-20	Killed in Operation Amok in Sawah Raja, Negeri Sembilan
PC 5397	Mohd Yusoff Bin Jamlus	1973-05-14	Drowned during Operation Ngayau at Sarawak
PC 49769	Nordin Bin Salleh	1973-05-14	Drowned during Operation Ngayau at Sarawak
PC 49833	Abdul Halim Bin Abdul Wahab	1973-05-14	Drowned during Operation Ngayau at Sarawak
Sgt 26081	Lee Han Cheong	1973-07-26	Killed during Operation Nuasa in Sungai Siput, Perak
ASP G/4741	Mohd Johny Bin Mustapha	1975-04-06	Killed by the PARAKU Communist group ambush at the black pepper plantation near the Setabau River, Sibu, Sarawak .PC 1642 awarded the Seri Pahlawan Gagah Perkasa for his courageously.
PC 1642	Nuing s/o Saling	1975-04-06	Killed by the PARAKU Communist group ambush at the black pepper plantation near the Setabau River, Sibu, Sarawak .PC 1642 awarded the Seri Pahlawan Gagah Perkasa for his courageously.
PC 41042	Suparman Bin Nasron	1975-06-18	Killed by communist ambush during Operation Ukur in Sadau, Thailand. A platoon of Jungle Squad from Police Field Force together with their Thailand counterpart escorting a topography team from the National Mapping Agency to measure Malaysia-Thailand border. The ambush killed 15 people, including eight from the Jungle Squad, three from National Mapping Agency and four from Royal Thai Police.
PC 46768	Mohd. Nor Bin Tumin	1975-06-18	Killed by communist ambush during Operation Ukur in Sadau, Thailand. A platoon of Jungle Squad from Police Field Force together with their Thailand counterpart escorting a topography team from the National Mapping Agency to measure Malaysia-Thailand border. The ambush killed 15 people, including eight from the Jungle Squad, three from National Mapping Agency and four from Royal Thai Police.
PC 46787	Maduain Bin Abdul Wahab	1975-06-18	Killed by communist ambush during Operation Ukur in Sadau, Thailand. A platoon of Jungle Squad from Police Field Force together with their Thailand counterpart escorting a topography team from the National Mapping Agency to measure Malaysia-Thailand border. The ambush killed 15 people, including eight from the Jungle Squad, three from National Mapping Agency and four from Royal Thai Police.
PC 46794	Alizar Bin Sarunan	1975-06-18	Killed by communist ambush during Operation Ukur in Sadau, Thailand. A platoon of Jungle Squad from Police Field Force together with their Thailand counterpart escorting a topography team from the National Mapping Agency to measure Malaysia-Thailand border. The ambush killed 15 people, including eight from the Jungle Squad, three from National Mapping Agency and four from Royal Thai Police.
PC 49316	Saian Salimin	1975-06-18	Killed by communist ambush during Operation Ukur in Sadau, Thailand. A platoon of Jungle Squad from Police Field Force together with their Thailand counterpart escorting a topography team from the National Mapping Agency to measure Malaysia-Thailand border. The ambush killed 15 people, including eight from the Jungle Squad, three from National Mapping Agency and four from Royal Thai Police.
PC 49386	Maan Bin Ahmad Siraj	1975-06-18	Killed by communist ambush during Operation Ukur in Sadau, Thailand. A platoon of Jungle Squad from Police Field Force together with their Thailand counterpart escorting a topography team from the National Mapping Agency to measure Malaysia-Thailand border. The ambush killed 15 people, including eight from the Jungle Squad, three from National Mapping Agency and four from Royal Thai Police.
PC 53415	Abu Nordin Bin Ibrahim	1975-06-18	Killed by communist ambush during Operation Ukur in Sadau, Thailand. A platoon of Jungle Squad from Police Field Force together with their Thailand counterpart escorting a topography team from the National Mapping Agency to measure Malaysia-Thailand border. The ambush killed 15 people, including eight from the Jungle Squad, three from National Mapping Agency and four from Royal Thai Police.
PC 55688	Mohd. Zahid Jumangat	1975-06-18	Killed by communist ambush during Operation Ukur in Sadau, Thailand. A platoon of Jungle Squad from Police Field Force together with their Thailand counterpart escorting a topography team from the National Mapping Agency to measure Malaysia-Thailand border. The ambush killed 15 people, including eight from the Jungle Squad, three from National Mapping Agency and four from Royal Thai Police.
ASP	Zamri Bin Ishak	1975-08-03	ASP Zamri Ishak head a team to track the communist guerrilla in Ops Bamboo on 3 August 1975. In the battle, Zamri was critically wounded when the booby trap exploded and struck the side of his foot. Further back-up squad giving aid him, however he died on the way to hospital several hours later.
Insp I/5084	Mohd Yusof Bin Talib	1975-08-14	Killed in ambush during Operation Sawadee
PC 55826	Mohd Yassin bin Salleh	1975-08-14	Killed in ambush during Operation Sawadee
PC 46955	Mohd Yusof Bin Abd Rahman	1975-09-03	Killed during morning physical training (PT) when subversive elements throws two grenades inside Police Field Force Central Brigade Camp in Kuala Lumpur. The grenades killed two Jungle Squad policemen and injured another 48.
PC 49614	Abd Hamid Bin Mohamad	1975-09-03	Killed during morning physical training (PT) when subversive elements throws two grenades inside Police Field Force Central Brigade Camp in Kuala Lumpur. The grenades killed two Jungle Squad policemen and injured another 48.
Cpl 31507	Ridzewan Bin Shaadan	1976-06-03	Killed by Ambush in Bukit Keramat Pulai while taking their training.
TPC 63897	Yusoff Bin Ismail	1976-06-03	Killed by Ambush in Bukit Keramat Pulai while taking their training.
TPC 63899	Zainal Bin Pandak Ahmad	1976-06-03	Killed by Ambush in Bukit Keramat Pulai while taking their training.
TPC 64010	Jaafar Bin Hj. Mansor	1976-06-03	Killed by Ambush in Bukit Keramat Pulai while taking their training.
PC 59511	Mohd Noor Bin Hashim	1978-01-05	Killed in food store located in Sungai Ruan, Pahang by Communist Terrorist.
PC 64580	Sharmuganithan	1978-01-05	Killed in food store located in Sungai Ruan, Pahang by Communist Terrorist.
Insp I/6702	Mohamed Rashid Bin Amran	1978-06-17	Killed in a Communist operation at Kroh, Ulu Perak.
Cpl 14711	Zakaria Bin Buntal	1978-06-17	Killed in a Communist operation at Kroh, Ulu Perak.
PC 46866	Mohd Noor Bin Yassin	1978-06-17	Killed in a Communist operation at Kroh, Ulu Perak.
PC 52925	Husrin Bin Abu Shah	1978-06-17	Killed in a Communist operation at Kroh, Ulu Perak.
PC 57343	Yusof Bin Ahmad	1978-06-17	Killed in a Communist operation at Kroh, Ulu Perak.
PC 59367	Ahmad Bin Yassin	1979-09-16	Killed during Operation Ulu Rening in Kuala Kubu Bharu, Selangor
PC 72218	Arzimi bin Maarof	1980-08-31	Killed during Operation Ukur at Malaysia-Thai border
Insp I/8042	Azmi Bin Hamzah	1985-11-09	Killed during Memali Incident in Kedah
Cpl 62076	Bah Dawel s/t Pitang	1989-11-09	Killed in the helicopter crash when the Royal Malaysian Air Force Sikorsky S61 Nuri was shot down by enemy fire at Gunung Gerah near the Perak – Kelantan state border resulted killing the officers and six RMAF crews. Few day later, all bodies were found by PASKAU commando forces during the CSAR operations. It is the worse in terms of Malaysian police casualties in a single crash incident to date, matched only by the deaths of fifteen officers.
Cpl 62456	Alang Itam	1989-11-09	Killed in the helicopter crash when the Royal Malaysian Air Force Sikorsky S61 Nuri was shot down by enemy fire at Gunung Gerah near the Perak – Kelantan state border resulted killing the officers and six RMAF crews. Few day later, all bodies were found by PASKAU commando forces during the CSAR operations. It is the worse in terms of Malaysian police casualties in a single crash incident to date, matched only by the deaths of fifteen officers.
PC 62393	Angah s/t Alek	1989-11-09	Killed in the helicopter crash when the Royal Malaysian Air Force Sikorsky S61 Nuri was shot down by enemy fire at Gunung Gerah near the Perak – Kelantan state border resulted killing the officers and six RMAF crews. Few day later, all bodies were found by PASKAU commando forces during the CSAR operations. It is the worse in terms of Malaysian police casualties in a single crash incident to date, matched only by the deaths of fifteen officers.
PC 62435	Ejah s/t Long	1989-11-09	Killed in the helicopter crash when the Royal Malaysian Air Force Sikorsky S61 Nuri was shot down by enemy fire at Gunung Gerah near the Perak – Kelantan state border resulted killing the officers and six RMAF crews. Few day later, all bodies were found by PASKAU commando forces during the CSAR operations. It is the worse in terms of Malaysian police casualties in a single crash incident to date, matched only by the deaths of fifteen officers.
PC 62444	Pandak s/t Alang	1989-11-09	Killed in the helicopter crash when the Royal Malaysian Air Force Sikorsky S61 Nuri was shot down by enemy fire at Gunung Gerah near the Perak – Kelantan state border resulted killing the officers and six RMAF crews. Few day later, all bodies were found by PASKAU commando forces during the CSAR operations. It is the worse in terms of Malaysian police casualties in a single crash incident to date, matched only by the deaths of fifteen officers.
PC 62587	Hassan s/t Itam	1989-11-09	Killed in the helicopter crash when the Royal Malaysian Air Force Sikorsky S61 Nuri was shot down by enemy fire at Gunung Gerah near the Perak – Kelantan state border resulted killing the officers and six RMAF crews. Few day later, all bodies were found by PASKAU commando forces during the CSAR operations. It is the worse in terms of Malaysian police casualties in a single crash incident to date, matched only by the deaths of fifteen officers.
PC 68853	Che Hasnor Bin Uval	1989-11-09	Killed in the helicopter crash when the Royal Malaysian Air Force Sikorsky S61 Nuri was shot down by enemy fire at Gunung Gerah near the Perak – Kelantan state border resulted killing the officers and six RMAF crews. Few day later, all bodies were found by PASKAU commando forces during the CSAR operations. It is the worse in terms of Malaysian police casualties in a single crash incident to date, matched only by the deaths of fifteen officers.
PC 68970	Hashim Bin Itam	1989-11-09	Killed in the helicopter crash when the Royal Malaysian Air Force Sikorsky S61 Nuri was shot down by enemy fire at Gunung Gerah near the Perak – Kelantan state border resulted killing the officers and six RMAF crews. Few day later, all bodies were found by PASKAU commando forces during the CSAR operations. It is the worse in terms of Malaysian police casualties in a single crash incident to date, matched only by the deaths of fifteen officers.
PC 71834	Pandak Hashim Bin Uda	1989-11-09	Killed in the helicopter crash when the Royal Malaysian Air Force Sikorsky S61 Nuri was shot down by enemy fire at Gunung Gerah near the Perak – Kelantan state border resulted killing the officers and six RMAF crews. Few day later, all bodies were found by PASKAU commando forces during the CSAR operations. It is the worse in terms of Malaysian police casualties in a single crash incident to date, matched only by the deaths of fifteen officers.
PC 109830	Armada Chos	1989-11-09	Killed in the helicopter crash when the Royal Malaysian Air Force Sikorsky S61 Nuri was shot down by enemy fire at Gunung Gerah near the Perak – Kelantan state border resulted killing the officers and six RMAF crews. Few day later, all bodies were found by PASKAU commando forces during the CSAR operations. It is the worse in terms of Malaysian police casualties in a single crash incident to date, matched only by the deaths of fifteen officers.
PC 112548	Hamad s/o Sodan	1989-11-09	Killed in the helicopter crash when the Royal Malaysian Air Force Sikorsky S61 Nuri was shot down by enemy fire at Gunung Gerah near the Perak – Kelantan state border resulted killing the officers and six RMAF crews. Few day later, all bodies were found by PASKAU commando forces during the CSAR operations. It is the worse in terms of Malaysian police casualties in a single crash incident to date, matched only by the deaths of fifteen officers.
PC 114771	Alang Sabasah s/o Pab Belkoi	1989-11-09	Killed in the helicopter crash when the Royal Malaysian Air Force Sikorsky S61 Nuri was shot down by enemy fire at Gunung Gerah near the Perak – Kelantan state border resulted killing the officers and six RMAF crews. Few day later, all bodies were found by PASKAU commando forces during the CSAR operations. It is the worse in terms of Malaysian police casualties in a single crash incident to date, matched only by the deaths of fifteen officers.
PC 114850	Arus s/t Awang	1989-11-09	Killed in the helicopter crash when the Royal Malaysian Air Force Sikorsky S61 Nuri was shot down by enemy fire at Gunung Gerah near the Perak – Kelantan state border resulted killing the officers and six RMAF crews. Few day later, all bodies were found by PASKAU commando forces during the CSAR operations. It is the worse in terms of Malaysian police casualties in a single crash incident to date, matched only by the deaths of fifteen officers.
PC 114956	Shamsuddin Bin Sharin	1989-11-09	Killed in the helicopter crash when the Royal Malaysian Air Force Sikorsky S61 Nuri was shot down by enemy fire at Gunung Gerah near the Perak – Kelantan state border resulted killing the officers and six RMAF crews. Few day later, all bodies were found by PASKAU commando forces during the CSAR operations. It is the worse in terms of Malaysian police casualties in a single crash incident to date, matched only by the deaths of fifteen officers.
PC 114957	Sarudin Bin Mat	1989-11-09	Killed in the helicopter crash when the Royal Malaysian Air Force Sikorsky S61 Nuri was shot down by enemy fire at Gunung Gerah near the Perak – Kelantan state border resulted killing the officers and six RMAF crews. Few day later, all bodies were found by PASKAU commando forces during the CSAR operations. It is the worse in terms of Malaysian police casualties in a single crash incident to date, matched only by the deaths of fifteen officers.
L/Cpl 68858	Hasir s/o Sari	2008-12-05	Collapsed shortly and died after he fell unconscious from the chair during rest in the control post at 18th Battalions, Pengkalan Hulu, Perak.
L/Cpl 68938	Ngah Nordin Bin Abu	2009-05-06	L/Cpl 68938's body found by his colleague in the event lying with bloodstained on floor at Malaysia-Thailand border control post in Kwan Chu Hill at 11:30 hrs in the morning. He's from the 3rd GOF Battalions in Bidor, Perak just arrived at his duty place yesterday and during the incident, he was alone in the post. His body was to be sent to Tuanku Fauziah Hospital for autopsy and pending results autopsy, the case is classified as sudden death. Also found beside his body was M16 rifle, however until now have yet to find if the shot caused by the weapon.
PC 161529	Mohd. Faizal Bin Ahmad	2009-07-11	Died at Tengku Ampuan Afzan Hospital after two days received treatment. PC 161529 which suspect dengue collapsed shortly during a D-class driving course at Police Training Centre, Kuala Lumpur on 9 July.
Sgt 72472	Mohd Hashamdi Bin Abdullah	2010-09-27	Killed in the traffic accident during a return trip to 15th Battalion Headquarters in Karamunting City.
L/Cpl 135379	Sylvester Assin	2010-09-27	Killed in the traffic accident during a return trip to 15th Battalion Headquarters in Karamunting City.
L/Cpl 137381	Agustine Lee	2010-09-27	Killed in the traffic accident during a return trip to 15th Battalion Headquarters in Karamunting City.
L/Cpl 148923	Mohd Sapieh Bin Jalhani	2010-09-27	Killed in the traffic accident during a return trip to 15th Battalion Headquarters in Karamunting City.
Sgt 124082	Abd Aziz Bin Sarikon	2013-03-02	Killed by Sulu militants during the Lahad Datu invasion in Kampung Simunul, Semporna on 2 March 2013. Four officers (an officer from Special Branch Bukit Aman along with three Sabah police) were fatally shot.
L/Cpl 160475	Mohd Azrul Bin Tukiran	2013-03-02	Killed by Sulu militants during the Lahad Datu invasion in Kampung Simunul, Semporna on 2 March 2013. Four officers (an officer from Special Branch Bukit Aman along with three Sabah police) were fatally shot.
Cpl	Baharudin A/L Ramli	2020-12-24 3rd GOF (Senoi Praaq)	Killed by smuggling groups during recon in Padang Besar, Perlis also near Malaysia-Thailand border on 24 November 2020. Corporal Norihan A/L Tari injured during shootout with smuggling group, result both receive Pingat Gagah Berani however Corporal Baharudin received his posthumous on 25 November same year while Norihan accepted his in July 2023

=== Keramat Pulai incidents ===
On 3 June 1976, 35 recruits from the Police Field Force members had been ambushed by the communist bandits at Bukit Keramat Pulai, Perak during their final phase of Basic Jungle Squad Training. During the incident at 12:45pm, Cpl 31507 Ridzuan who was a platoon leader as well as drill instructor was fatally shot in his side of eye. Three trainees TPC 63897 Zainal, TPC 63899 Yusof and TPC 64010 Md. Saad were also killed about 15 metres from the communist control post. However, TPC 60899 Mohamad Salim and his teammates returned enemy fire. Shortly, this platoon successfully captured the communist stronghold which was modified to look like a house after the communist retreated after receiving violent opposition from the trainees. On extraordinary courage, TPC 60899 Mohamad Salim and TPC Mohammad Noh Hashim were both awarded the Panglima Gagah Berani one year later.

== Operations ==
- 1948 – 1960 - During the Malayan Emergency, the Police Field Force were involved in security and offensive operations against communist insurgents.
- 1963 – 1966 - The service together with military forces to fight against the Indonesian soldiers during the Confrontation.
- 1968 – 1989 - The Police Field Force deployed to track down the Communist Terrorists before the CPM accepted unconditional surrender in 1989.
- 1969 – The Police Field Force involved in security roles during the 13 May 1969 riots in Kuala Lumpur.
- 2001 – The General Operations Force supported the Pasukan Gerakan Khas anti-terror police to track downed Mat Komando, the crime leader of Gang 13 before he killed in shoot-out in the hut at Kampung Hujung Keton, Pendang, Kedah.
- 2007 – The Royal Malaysia Police deployed a force of 136 men from the Sarawak General Operations Force to Timor Leste. The force joined the United Nations Integrated Mission in Timor Leste, employed in the peace-keeping role.
- 2013 – Involved in 2013 Lahad Datu standoff. Deployed alongside Pasukan Gerakan Khas, Grup Gerak Khas, 10 Paratrooper Brigade, PASKAL, PASKAU and Unit Gempur Marin.
- 2019- 3rd and 19th GOF Battalions (Senoi Praaq) involved in joint operations with Department of Wildlife and National Parks Peninsular Malaysia in Pahang, Perak
- 2020-2022- General Operations Forces deployed in all Malaysia for Movement control order during COVID-19 alongside all agencies

== In popular culture ==
Television show about the GOF

- Gerak Khas (TV series) (1999–2020) - a few episode of season year 2000, 2001, 2004 showing role GOF during operation against pirates and militants
- Akademi Polis (2008–2010)– a few episode showing role GOF teach recruits police who training jungle and fiction team
- Titisan Darah Pahlawan (2013)–a Radio Televisyen Malaysia historical drama 30 episodes about recipient of medal who fought communist insurgency
- Kalis Peluru (2023)–a Radio Televisyen Malaysia action police drama 13 episodes about life policemen with GOF
- Lembing & Layang– a 2010 mini series biopic about early squadron orang asli later called Senoi Praaq
- 999 (Malaysian TV series)

Films about the GOF

- Awang Spanar – a 1987 film comedy action about two young man with policewomen solve kidnapping case and a scene GOF troops raid safehouse kidnapping
- Jaket Biru - a 1991 action film about undercover cops and where scene GOF troops raid criminal hideout places
- Bukit Kepong a 1981 patriotic film about tragedy Bukit Kepong attack in February 1950
- "Takluk: Lahad Datu", a 2024 police war action film directed by Zulkarnain Azhar. The film is about VAT 69 involved based on 2013 Lahad Datu standoff and the movie also featured GOF involvement within the conflict in the movie.

== Weaponry ==
The firearms used by GOF during the year 1948 - 1980s.

Firearms Data
Pistols/Revolvers	Shotguns	Submachineguns	Rifles	Machineguns	Grenades	Mortars
Browning HP	Winchester M1897	Sten Mk.II	Heckler & Koch HK33	Bren LMG	Mills bomb	British 2-inch mortar
Colt M1911A1	Browning Auto-5	Sten Mk.V	Lee–Enfield Rifle No. 4 Mk.I			ML 3-inch Mortar
Webley Revolver	Stevens single shotgun	Sterling L2A3	Lee–Enfield Rifle No. 4 Mk.II			
S&W M&P			Lee–Enfield Rifle No. 4 Mk.III			
			Lee–Enfield No.5 Mk.I			
			FN FAL L1A1 SLR			
			M1 carbine			
			M1A1 Carbine			
			M2 Carbine			

The firearms used by GOF during the year 1980 - presents.

Firearms Data
Pistols/Revolvers	Shotguns	Submachineguns	Assault Rifles	Sniper Rifles	Machineguns	Grenades
Beretta M92F	Remington M870	HK MP5A2	Colt M16A1	HK G3/SG-1	FN MAG	HK 69
Browning HP Mk.III	Remington M1100	HK MP5A3	Colt M16A2		HK 11 LMG	M79 Grenade Launcher
Glock 19			Colt M4			M203
HK P9S						M67 grenade
S&W .38 2-inch Rev.						High Explosive Grenade
S&W .38 3-inch Rev.						Tear Gas Grenade
S&W .38 4-inch Rev.						
SIG Sauer P226						
SIG Sauer P228						
Steyr M-9						
Vektor SP1						
Walther P99						
Yavuz 16 Compact						

== See also ==
- Directorate of National Coordination (Laos)
- Republic of Vietnam National Police Field Force
