= Special Branch (Malaysia) =

Intelligence agency of Royal Malaysia Police

Special Branch Cawangan Khas
- Abbreviation: SB

Agency overview
- Formed: 1948
- Preceding agency: Malayan Security Service
- Employees: Classified
- Annual budget: Classified

Jurisdictional structure
- National agency: Malaysia
- Operations jurisdiction: Malaysia
- Primary governing body: Government of Malaysia
- Secondary governing body: Royal Malaysia Police
- Constituting instrument: Section 3(3) and Section 20(3) Police Act 1967
- General nature: Civilian police

Operational structure
- Overseen by: Ministry of Home Affairs (Malaysia)
- Headquarters: Bukit Aman
- Minister responsible: Saifuddin Nasution Ismail, Minister of Home Affairs
- Agency executive: Ibrahim Darus, Director of Special Branch

Notables
- Significant operations: Malayan Emergency; Second Malayan Emergency

The Special Branch (SB; Malay: Cawangan Khas) is an intelligence agency attached to the Royal Malaysia Police (PDRM). The SB is empowered to acquire and develop intelligence on internal and external threats to the nation, subversive activities, extremist activities and activities of sabotage and spying. The SB has also been accused of carrying out unlawful enforced disappearances.

The SB is responsible for analyzing situations and advising on the necessary courses of action for various departments and agencies, both within the police department and in coordination with other related agencies. In the past, they have worked together with Thai police officers in reforming the Thai Special Branch.

== History ==
The SB was established in 1948 during the British colonial era and has since evolved to become a key intelligence agency in Malaysia.

In August 2025, Inspector-General of Police Datuk Seri Mohd Khalid Ismail stated that SB officers were involved in 144 operations between January and July 2025 targeting economic sabotage, migrant smuggling, and document forgery.

=== Controversies ===
On May 11, 2021, Abdul Hamid Bador accused Malaysian officials of using SB for political purposes. This was despite his promise to not allow the unit to silence anyone critical of the Malaysian government in a 2019 statement.

On June 5, 2026, ex-SB counter-terrorism officer Mohd Nazli Mohamed was fined for accepting a bribe worth RM10,500 from the father of an Islamic State suspect.

== Organisation ==
When the SB was formed in Malaysia, it had its roots from Britain, where the Special Irish Branch was formed.

The SB only report to the Inspector General of the Police (IGP) in the PDRM. They reportedly have a budget of RM500 million.

As of 2023, 10,000 persons are under the SB with 10 to 15,000 informants in Malaysia.

=== 1970-1990 (During Second Malayan Emergency) ===
E1 - Communism
E1 was the main unit under the Special Branch responsible for counterinsurgency operations against underground movements of the Communist Party of Malaya (PKM). This included anti-intelligence operations against enemy forces, interrogation processes to gather intelligence from captured or surrendered enemy members (SEPs), and the translation and analysis of documents seized from the communists.

E2 - Extremism
E2 supervised and monitored any movements of extreme organizations or groups that could threaten national and domestic security, such as left-wing labor and mass movements, political parties with extremist ideologies, student and university organizations

E3 - Logistics
E3 was responsible for technical matters such as monitoring, support, and technical administration during operations.

E4 - External Communism
This was a crucial unit within the Special Branch, tasked with monitoring the infiltration of foreign communist influences into Malaysia. During the Emergency (1968-1989), it closely watched parties like the Communist Party of Indonesia (PKI), the Chinese Communist Party, the Communist Party of Thailand (PKT), the Communist Party of Vietnam (PKV), and the Communist Party of the Soviet Union (CPSU). It also handled diplomatic security for Malaysian embassies, consulates, and High Commission offices abroad by deploying security attachés.

E5 - Security
E5 managed security at the country's entry points and borders, covering airports (domestic and international), passport control and travel regulation, and VIP security protection, both domestic and international.

E6 - Administration
E6 identified and listed key operational areas of PKM's combat units, including the locations of strongholds and training camps, names of Central, State, and District Committee members, and key commanders of PKM combat units. It also managed the team's finances, operations, and weaponry for upcoming operations.

E7 - Terrorism
E7 was tasked with preventing movements characterized by terrorism or violent groups other than communist organizations.

== Activities ==
=== Communist insurgency (1948–1989) ===
During the Malayan Emergency, when the Malayan Communist Party (MCP) guerrillas were in open revolt, the Special Branch successfully infiltrated the party chain of command. Reportedly, one Special Branch officer managed to gain sufficient trust from the MCP to be ordered to infiltrate the Special Branch. He in turn managed to feed false information back to the MCP. It has also been claimed that the second-most high-ranking official in the MCP was a Special Branch agent, who was executed when he was discovered.

The Special Branch's activities during the Emergency were widely praised, garnering accolades such as one calling it "one of the finest establishments of its kind in the world". Other intelligence agencies sent observers to a Special Branch training centre in the Malayan capital of Kuala Lumpur to learn its tactics of infiltration and espionage. It was during this period that the British "Asianized" the Special Branch, replacing its crop of British spies and officers with trained locals.

=== Anwar Ibrahim scandal ===
In 1998, former Deputy Prime Minister Anwar Ibrahim was charged with sodomy and corruption, both crimes in Malaysia. During his trial, a number of statements were made by Special Branch officials, who had been implicated in the case.

One allegation made against Anwar was that he had ordered Special Branch officials to obtain retractions of the sodomy-related allegations against him. However, the Special Branch officials involved told the court that they had reason to believe the charges were fabricated by Anwar's political opponents. Two Special Branch men involved were its then Director, Mohamed Said bin Awang, and Second Deputy Director, Amir bin Junus. One witness at the trial testified that Mohamed Said had told Anwar to allow the Special Branch to look into the matter, instead of Anwar directing the Special Branch to cover it up.

During the trial, Mohamed Said shed light on the Special Branch's practices — mainly by explaining what was called a "turning-over operation", whereby retractions were obtained. At one point, he described it as a "great secret", and refused to elaborate beyond his explanation that "Basically we do a quick assessment on our target, then we see how the possibilities are to turn over their stand," and that "If it is a certain political stand, we may neutralize the stand if it is a security threat". Mohamed Said later responded to the question "If someone higher than the deputy prime minister were to instruct you to come and lie to the court here, would you do it?" with "Depends on the situation." After being pressed for a clarification by the judge, he said, "I may or I may not".

=== Raja Petra claims ===
Raja Petra Kamarudin, a former detainee under the Internal Security Act (ISA), has claimed that when he was brought in for questioning, he was astonished by how well-informed they were about his activities: "It was astonishing that they had been able to take all those photographs of me without me realising it. It began to make me wonder whether they had any other photographs of me and my wife in my bedroom doing.....well, you know. ... It was as if they had been present in the meeting room, had participated in the meeting, and had tape-recorded the entire session. We might as well just admit our crime and sign the confession..." He also claimed that the Special Branch had successfully infiltrated the hierarchy of several political parties in the country.

=== The arrest of Mas Selamat Kastari ===
In February 2008, a major leader of the Singaporean Jemaah Islamiah (JI), Mas Selamat escaped from the Whitley Road Detention Center, a detention centre of the most stringent in Southeast Asia. A few months later, he was found hiding in a village house in Kampung Tawakal, Skudai, 40 km from the city of Johor Bahru.

With the surveillance and planning with tactical raids well planned, on 1 April 2009 06:00 AM with the help from UTK counter-terrorist unit, the Special Branch managed to apprehend the leader of the militants in the home village. UTK outflank every corner of the house when Mas Selamat was sleeping.

According to witnesses the incident, Mohd Saat Marjo, 57, who was a neighbour next door told that a UTK armed with automatic weapons, along with members of the Special Branch in plain clothes, stormed the house through two gates which are broken as soon as Mas Selamat refused to come out to surrender even called by the police. He was handcuffed and his face was covered with dark blue cloth before being taken out. Regular members of JI, Abdul Matin Anol Rahmat and Johar Hassan were also arrested there. Police also seized a number of JI's documents and confidential planning information and sent Bomb Disposal Unit to ensure that the house was free of any explosives. However, the involvement of UTK in the operation was not made public because of the high level of secrecy. The arrest was credited to the Special Branch unit.

=== Abduction of Pastor Raymond Koh and Amri Che Mat ===
In 2019, a national inquiry held by the Human Rights Commission of Malaysia's (SUHAKAM) concluded that agents of the Special Branch were responsible for the abduction of Amri Che Mat in 2016 and Raymond Koh in 2017.

== See also ==
- Special Branch - Other Special Branch units in Britain and Commonwealth countries/territories

== Notes and references ==
=== Further reading ===
- Comber, Leon (2006). "Malaya's Secret Police 1945–60. The Role of the Special Branch in the Malayan Emergency". PhD dissertation, Monash University. Melbourne: ISEAS (Institute of SE Asian Affairs, Singapore) and MAI (Monash Asia Institute).
