= List of active Argentine Navy aircraft =

This is a list of active aircraft of the Naval Aviation Command (COAN) of the Navy of the Argentine Republic as of 2022/23. For a list of all the aircraft operated by the COAN since its creation, see List of aircraft of Argentine Naval Aviation.

== Aircraft ==
Model	Image	Quantity	Origin	Description
Super Étendard		16	France	Attack aircraft in service since 1981, 14 received, 3 lost. Original aircraft out of service. 5 refurbished aircraft delivered in 2019, but non-operational as of 2026 due to absence of key spare parts.
P-3C Orion		4	United States	Maritime patrol aircraft, 1 P-3N/3 P-3C ordered; service entry 2024-27
BE-200 Cormorán		7	United States	Maritime patrol aircraft, BE-200M/G/F versions in service since 1978, four of them has been converted to BE-200 Cormorán. One reported operational as of 2020; being replaced by 2 Beechcraft TC-12B Hurons in ultility role as of 2023
T-34 Mentor		10	United States	Primary trainer since 1978, 15 received. T-34C-1 version in service in Naval Aviation School since 1978.
SH-3 Sea King		7	United States	Utility helicopter, entered in service in 1972, embarked on the ARA Almirante Irízar (Q-5). PH-3s back in service in 2016 after several years out of service, and UH-3H still grounded. Two of five reported operational as of 2020; two additional aircraft purchased in late 2021 and delivered in November 2022
AS555 Fennec		4	France	Armed helicopter, AS555SN version in service since 1996. One reported operational as of 2026
