= Anuar Alias =

Retired Royal Malaysian Navy personnel

Yang Berbahagia First Admiral Dato' Anuar Alias DSIS PAT SMS PGB KAT KMN AMS PPT PJM PNBB PPS PPA
- Born: Anuar bin Haji Alias; 25 March 1962 (age 64); Puchong, Selangor, Federation of Malaya
- Education: Naval War College; Universiti Tun Abdul Razak
- Spouse: Zainon Muzio
- Children: 7
- Military career
- Allegiance: Malaysia
- Branch: Royal Malaysian Navy
- Service years: 1981–2021
- Rank: First Admiral
- Unit: Naval Special Forces
- Commands: Assault Squadron of PASKAL; KD Sri Semporna; Headquarters of the Naval Special Forces (as Chief of staff); Cell D of J3, Joint Forces Command; Naval Special Forces; RMN Lumut Naval Base
- Conflicts: Somali Civil War; Angolan Civil War
- Awards: Star of the Commander of Valour (PGB)

Dato' Anuar bin Haji Alias, PGB, is a former senior Royal Malaysian Navy officer, special forces frogman, and national hero in Malaysia. He is the Royal Malaysian Navy's (RMN) sole recipient of the Star of the Commander of Valour (Malay: Bintang Panglima Gagah Berani — PGB), Malaysia's second-highest gallantry award. He last position is the Commander of the RMN Lumut Naval Base before retirement on late 2021 .

Anuar serves as one of the inspirations for the main character in the film PASKAL: The Movie.

== Early life and education ==
Anuar was born in Puchong, Selangor, on 25 March 1962.

As a frogman of Naval Special Forces (Malay: Pasukan Khas Laut; Abbr: PASKAL), Anuar received special operations training from local and international schools. The Foreign Advanced Clearance Diving Course at HMAS Penguin in Australia was the most notable course he took. He also attended the Naval War College in the United States in 2006 and the Lembaga Ketahanan Nasional in Indonesia, where he received the Best Foreign Trainee Award in 2016.

Anuar earned a Master of Management degree from Universiti Tun Abdul Razak in 2009.

== Navy career ==
Anuar joined Royal Malaysian Navy on 1 February 1981. Later in his navy career, he spent the majority of his time in the PASKAL. Among the positions he has held are Commander of Assault Squadron, Commander of KD Sri Semporna (RMN stone frigate and home to PASKAL's Unit 2), Chief of Staff of PASKAL Headquarters, Director of Special Operations at Joint Forces Command, Commander of PASKAL, and Commander of RMN Lumut Naval Base, which he has held since 20 February 2020 until retired in December 2021 .

Anuar has also served on a number of United Nations peacekeeping missions, mostly in Africa. Among the missions in which he has served are UNISOM II, UNAVEM II, MONUA and UNIFIL.

== UN mission in Angola 1998-99 ==
Anuar's rank at the time was Lieutenant Commander, and he was the commander of PASKAL's Assault Squadron. From 21 January 1998 to 17 January 1999, he was deployed to Angola as part of a MONUA peacekeeping mission. He was involved in four combat engagements during that time.

In November 1998, Anuar was involved in one of four combat engagements during the mission. He was on patrol with one Portuguese UN Observer and two Namibian peacekeepers on the main road from Huambo to Alto Hama when they heard gunshots. The patrols moved quickly towards the sound of gunshots and noticed a group of Angolan Armed Forces (FAA) soldiers ambushing a truck 100 meters away. Four-man patrols then arrived and took control of the area, forcing the enemies to flee. Anuar discovered a driver, and two women were killed as a result of the ambush. The patrol's 4x4 truck transported all of the deceased women and two children to the hospital. Anuar later returned to the scene on his own to help an injured woman who had been overlooked during the chaos. Later that month, Anuar and his team were involved in a combat between UNITA and the Angola National Police and the FAA near Alto Hama.

On 2 June 2000, the King of Malaysia conferred on him the Star of the Commander of Valour (PGB) for his bravery in combat.

== Movie consultation ==
Anuar was directed by the Chief of Navy in March 2018 to consult on the production of an action film based on PASKAL's operations. The first half of the film revolves around Anuar's operations in Angola. He is also one of the inspirations for the film's main character, Lieutenant Commander Arman Rahmat, played by Hairul Azreen. The film was later officially titled as Paskal: The Movie.

== Honours ==
=== Honours of Malaysia ===
- Malaysia
  - Officer of the Order of the Defender of the Realm (KMN) (2011)
  - Recipient of the Star of the Commander of Valour (PGB) (2000)
  - Recipient of the Loyal Service Medal (PPS)
  - Recipient of the General Service Medal (PPA)
  - Recipient of the United Nations Missions Service Medal (PNBB) with "ANGOLA" and "SOMALIA" clasps
- Malaysian Armed Forces
  - Warrior of the Most Gallant Order of Military Service (PAT)
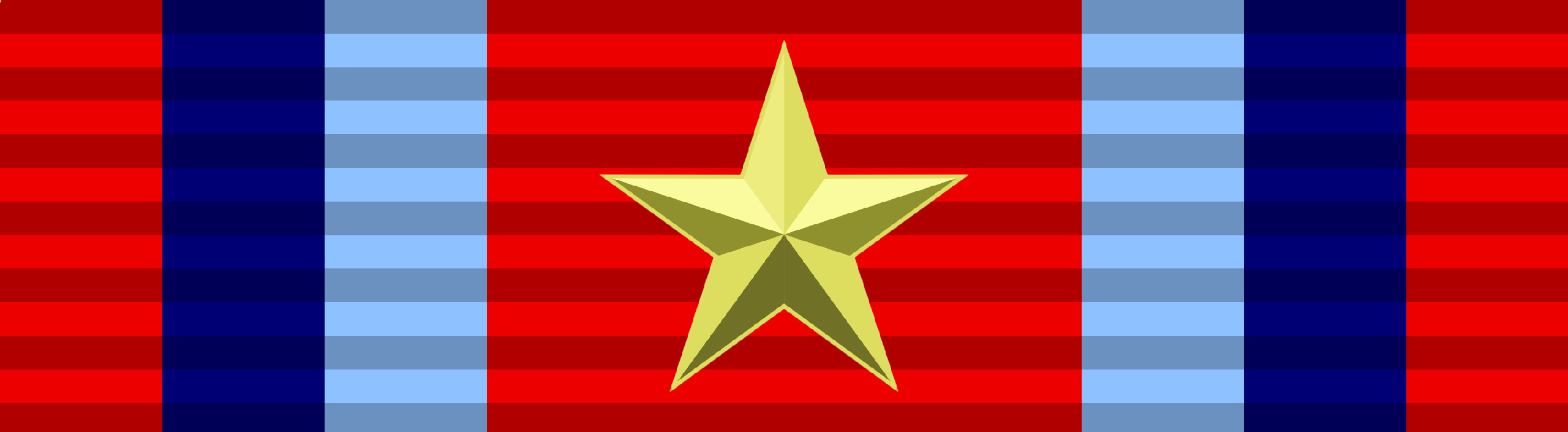
  - Officer of the Most Gallant Order of Military Service (KAT) (1999)
  - Recipient of the Malaysian Service Medal (PJM)
- Selangor
  - Knight Companion of the Order of Sultan Sharafuddin Idris Shah (DSIS) – Dato' (2018)
  - Companion of the Order of the Crown of Selangor (SMS) (2013)
  - Member of the Order of the Crown of Selangor (AMS) (2009)
  - Recipient of the Distinguished Conduct Medal (PPT)

=== International honours ===
- United Nations
  - United Nations Medal (UNISOM II)
  - United Nations Medal with "2" award numerals (UNAVEM II and MONUA)
