= Lumut Naval Base =

Malaysian naval base

- Markas Pangkalan Lumut مركس ڤڠكالن لوموت
- Manjung District; Near Sitiawan in Malaysia
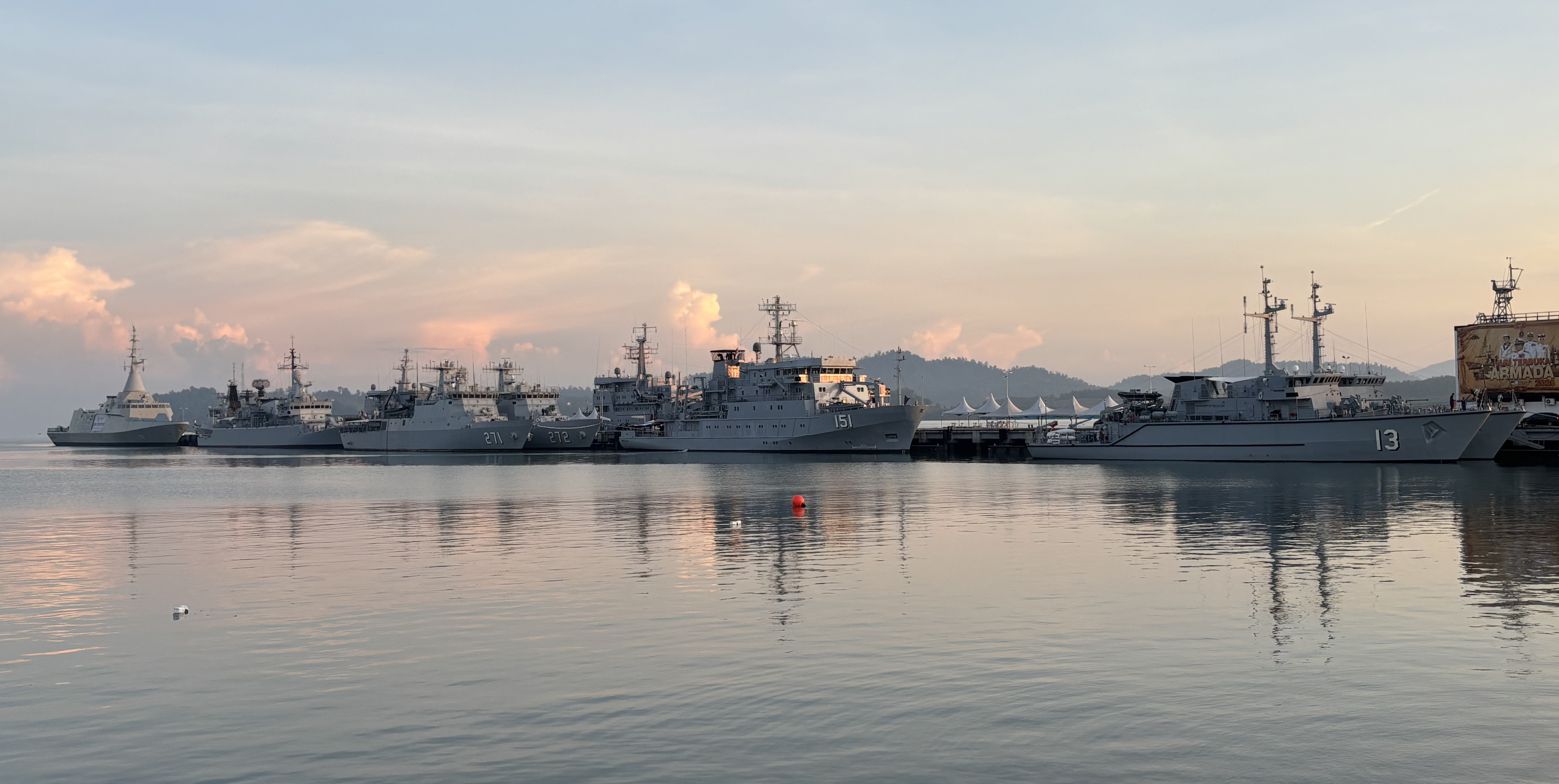
- Lumut naval base during sunrise

Site information
- Type: Military base
- Owner: Ministry of Defense
- Operator: Royal Malaysian Navy
- Controlled by: KD Malaya
- Website: Markas Pangkalan Lumut Official (Official Social Media)

Location
- Coordinates: 4°13′42″N 100°36′42″E
- Area: 1,800 acres (7.3 km^{2})

Site history
- Built: 1973
- Built by: Friedrich Kocks GmbH & Co KG; Blohm & Voss; Thyssen AG
- In use: 1980–present

Garrison information
- Current commander: First Admiral Noor Zukhi Hj Harun
- Past commanders: Dato' Anuar Alias PGB
- Garrison: Western Fleet Command; Education and Training Command; Naval Special Forces HQ; RMN Naval Air HQ
- Occupants: Commander of Western Fleet Command

Airfield information
- Identifiers: ICAO: WMLH
Helipads
Number	Length and surface
	700 feet (210 m) Concrete

Lumut Naval Base (Malay: Markas Pangkalan Lumut; Jawi: مركس ڤڠكالن لوموت) is a Royal Malaysian Navy military base in Lumut, Perak, about 100 miles (160 km) from Kuala Lumpur. It is Malaysia's largest naval base, and it has served as the Royal Malaysian Navy's headquarters since 9 September 1984, replacing Woodlands Naval Base in Singapore. This base now serves as the headquarters for the Royal Malaysian Navy's (RMN) Western Fleet Command, while the Sepangar Bay Naval Base serves as the headquarters for the RMN's Eastern Fleet Command.

First Admiral Noor Zukhi Hj Harun is the current commander of Lumut Naval Base, succeeding First Admiral Dato' Anuar Alias PGB on 11 November 2021.

== History ==
=== Background ===
Woodlands Naval Base in Singapore has served as the Malaysian navy's headquarters since before Malaysia gained independence from the United Kingdom. Even after Singapore's expulsion from Malaysia in 1963, the base that serves as the home of KD Malaya is still operational under Malaysia. The Malaysian government planned to move the Royal Malaysia Navy's headquarters to Malaysia in 1969, but they couldn't agree on a location.

=== 1973–1980 ===
==== Created as a regional naval base ====
In order to defend the Malacca Straits, the Royal Malaysia Navy established a small base in Lumut in January 1973.

==== Upgraded to Navy Headquarters ====
On 5 July 1975, Malaysia's then-Prime Minister, Abdul Razak Hussein, visited the Woodlands Naval Base and expressed concern that the existing jetty was insufficient for the Royal Malaysia Navy's future plans, and that it was also unsuitable for a Royal Malaysia Navy headquarters located outside of Malaysia. Following his visit, the Royal Malaysian Navy agenda was incorporated into the Third Malaysia Plan, which includes upgrading Woodlands Naval Base, fleet modernization, and the construction of two new Royal Malaysian Navy military bases (later to become Lumut Naval Base and Kuantan Naval Base).

The Royal Malaysian Navy formed a team called the Naval Study Team, led by Commander V. Ramachandran, as the Head of Operations and Planning, and Lieutenant Commander T.A. Scully, as the Head of Engineering, and the team collaborated with Friedrich Kocks GmbH & Co KG, a West Germany civil engineering firm that had already built a small naval base in Lumut, and they began looking for a suitable location to build a naval base. Initially, Klang was chosen as the location for the base. However, after a thorough examination of the geography of Klang, they decided on Lumut as the location for the Royal Malaysian Navy headquarters.

==== Shipyard ====
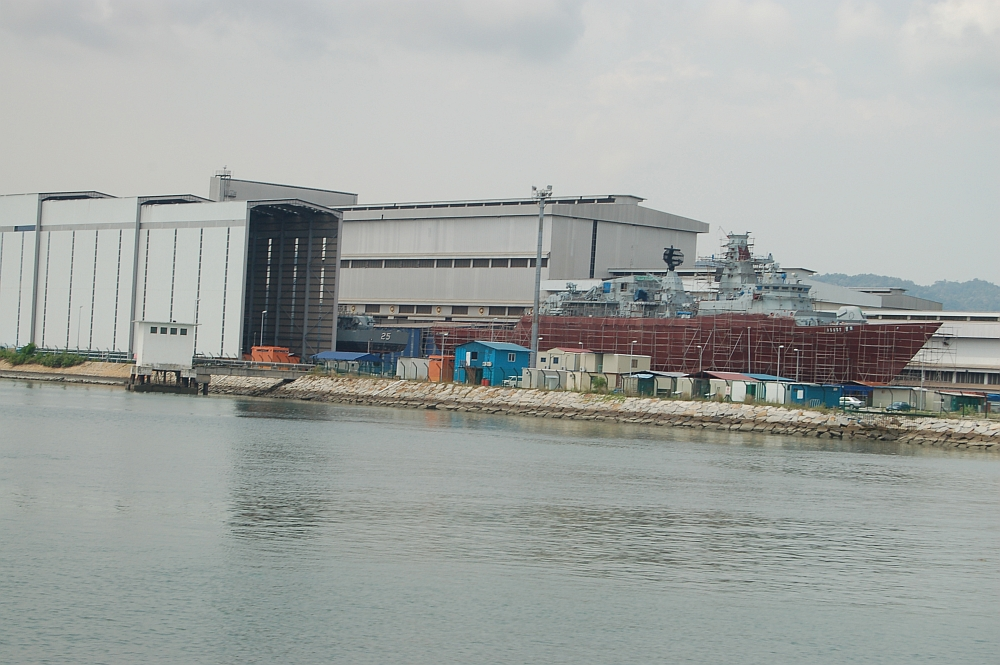
Lumut Naval Base's shipyard.

The Royal Malaysian Navy planned to build a shipyard for ship maintenance at Lumut Naval Base in 1977, and two German firms, Blohm & Voss and Thyssen AG, were selected to build the shipyard. The shipyard is now known as the Boustead Naval Shipyard.

==== Training centre ====
In 1977, the Royal Malaysian Navy sent officers to three nations' navy forces, the United Kingdom, France, and West Germany, to visit naval training centres. During their visits, the Royal Malaysian Navy expressed interest in the maritime tactics training and plans to build one in Lumut. Aside from the tactics centre, the Royal Malaysian Navy is also constructing a basic boot camp here.

The training centre received its first batch of recruits for basic training on 14 January 1980.

=== 1980–1990s ===
==== The RMN headquarters are relocating to Lumut ====
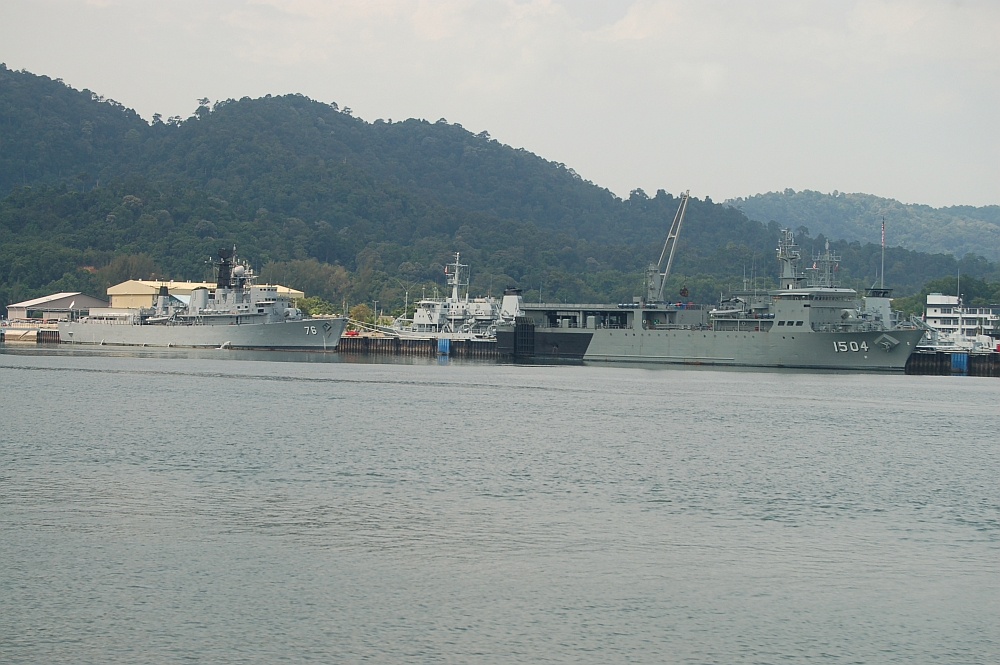
KD Hang Tuah and KD Mahawangsa were docked at the Lumut Naval Base's jetty.

On 9 September 1984, the Royal Malaysian Navy HQ in Woodlands Naval Base began relocating to Lumut Naval Base after 9 years of construction. The relocations were marked by a ceremony in accordance with Royal Navy customs. Captain Khoo Tee Chuan, then Commander of Navy Fleet Material Support, led the ceremony by boarding the KD Hang Tuah, which was decked out in all Royal Malaysian Navy unit colours.

==== Heliport ====
The Royal Malaysian Navy purchased six used Westland Wasp helicopters from the Royal Navy in May 1986. As part of the agreement, the Royal Navy will loan two pilots, one aviation engineer, and five aviation technicians to the Royal Malaysian Navy. As a result, the Royal Malaysian Navy constructed a heliport at the Lumut Naval Base, thereby establishing the Naval Air Unit.

== Tenant units ==
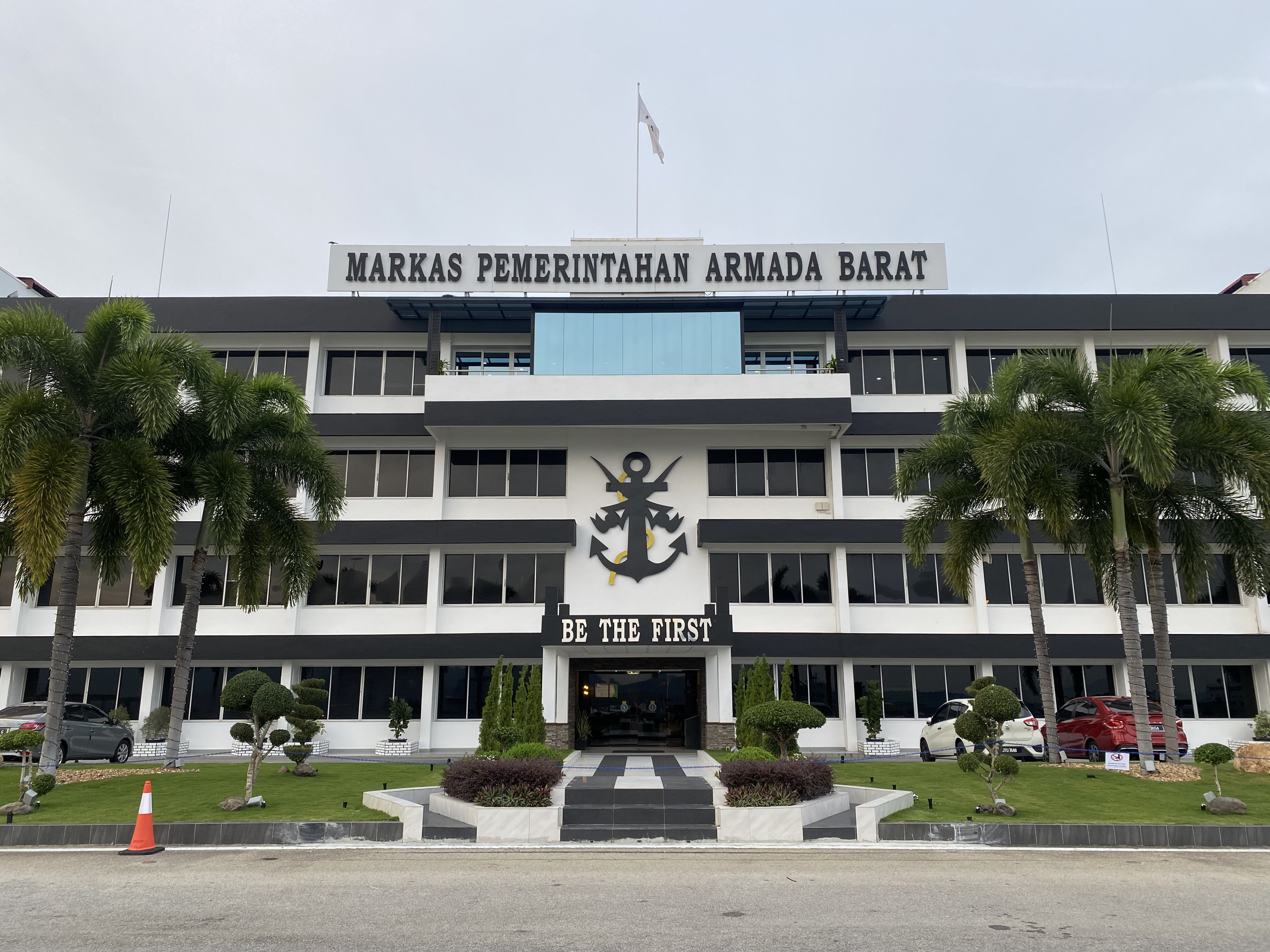
Office of the RMN Western Fleet Command.

Lumut Naval Base is a large military installation that houses several Royal Malaysian Navy units. Among the tenants' units are:

Shore establishments (the Stone frigate).

- Western Fleet Command – The overall command of all RMN operations in Western Malaysia.
- KD Malaya – The unit is in charge of managing the base's services and infrastructure for the staff at the Lumut Naval Base.
- RMN Naval Air HQ – The overall command of all RMN Naval Air units.
  - KD Rajawali – The official name of the RMN Naval Air unit stationed at the Lumut Naval Base.
- RMN Education and Training Command HQ
  - KD Pelandok – The RMN training centre's official name.
  - KD Sultan Idris 1 – The official name of the RMN officers training centre.
- Diving and Mine Warfare HQ – The command of the RMN clearance diver, explosive ordnance disposal (EOD), and salvage diver.
  - KD Duyong – The RMN diving school's official name.
- KD Sri Manjung – The official name for the RMN Reserves in Lumut.
- Naval Special Forces HQ – Command of the RMN's special operations forces and training facility.
  - KD Panglima Hitam – The official name of PASKAL's Unit 1.
  - KD Panglima Garang – The official name of PASKAL's training facilities.
- Protela Lumut – The military police unit who enforce the law on the Lumut Naval Base.

Malaysian Army unit

- 96 Armed Forces Hospital – A military hospital under administration of Royal Medical and Dental Corps.
- Spiritual Growth Centre – A spiritual centre under administration of Military Religious Corps.

== Facilities ==
The following facilities were available at Lumut Naval Base:

- Clubs and messes
- Shopping arcades
- Religious buildings, including:
  - An-Nur mosque
  - Tai Seong Loh Koon Buddhist temple
  - Sri Ramar Hindu temple
- Sports facilities, including:
  - Football Stadium
  - Indoor Stadium
  - Golf course
  - Swimming pool
- Military hospital
- Schools and kindergartens, including:
  - SMK Pangkalan TLDM (Secondary school)
  - SK Pangkalan TLDM (Primary school)
- One federal government department responsible for the construction and maintenance of the camp
