= List of aircraft of Argentine Naval Aviation =

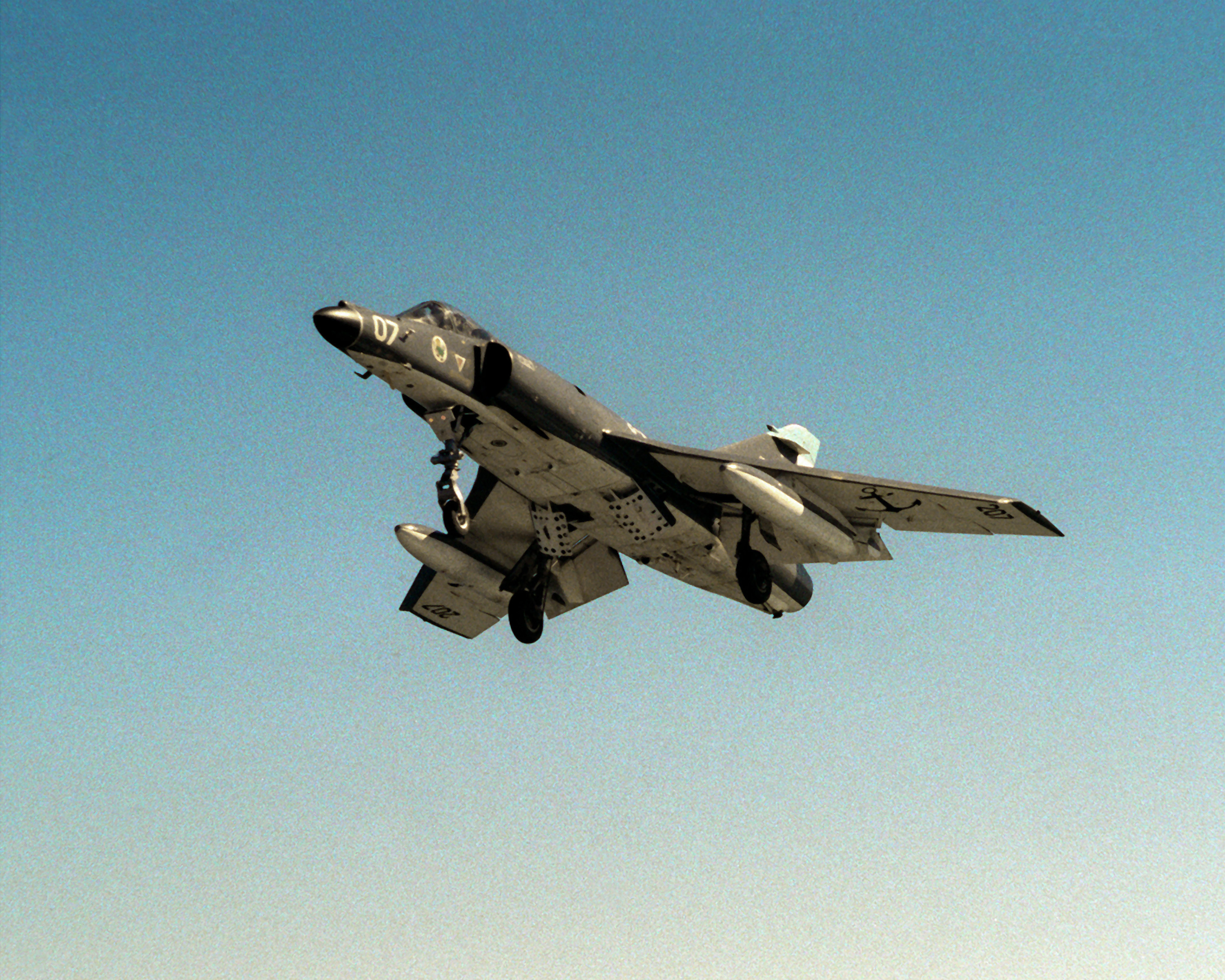
A Super Etendard approaching USS Abraham Lincoln

This is a list of all aircraft (fixed-wing and rotary-wing) obtained or operated by the Argentine Naval Aviation since its formation. For the current inventory please refer to the main article.

== Fixed-wing aircraft ==
Aircraft	Origin	Type	#	In service	Notes
Aermacchi MB-326	Italy	jet trainer	8 (GB) 11 (GC)	1968-1997 1982-2008	GC Xavante built by Embraer
Aermacchi MB-339A	Italy	jet trainer	10	1980-1990	Falklands War: Six operated from Port Stanley Airport
Avro 552A	UK	seaplane trainer	12	1919-1932	Special seaplane configuration for the Argentine Navy
Beechcraft AT-11	US	Bomber trainer	13	1946 - 1965	Replaced by Beechcraft C-45H
Beechcraft C-45	US	Utility			
Beechcraft D-18S	US	Utility	4	1948 - ?	
Beechcraft Queen Air B65-80	US	light transport	5		One used as surveillance aircraft during 1975 Operativo Independencia
Beechcraft Super King Air 200	US	light transport Maritime Patrol	3 4		4 refit under Cormoran program
Beech T-34C Turbo Mentor	US	turboprop trainer	15	1978–present	Falklands War: 4
Boeing-Stearman Model 75	US	biplane trainer	16 (Model 76D1) 60 (N2S)	1936-1949 late 1940s to early 1960s	includes 6 S76D-1 with EDO floats
Consolidated P2Y	US	flying boat	6	1936-1948 or -1949	
Consolidated PBY Catalina	US	flying boat		1946-1970	
Curtiss JN-4	US	trainer	4	1924-1935	
Curtiss HS-2L	US	trainer flying boat	8+4	1921-1931	
Curtiss CT-32 Condor	US	transport	3	1937-1949	
Curtiss F5L	US	patrol/bomber flying boat	8	1921-1935	relegated to trainer duties in 1931
Curtiss-Wright CW-16E.3 "Kelito"	US	trainer	28	1935-1957	15 assembled at BAPI workshops, 13 built under license
Dassault-Breguet Super Étendard	France	embarked jet strike fighter	14	1981–present	Falklands War: 5 from Rio Grande
Dornier Wal	Germany	patrol/bomber flying boat	4	1922-1932	
Douglas A-4Q Skyhawk	US	embarked jet attack fighter	16 (+2)	1971-1988	Falklands War: 8 from Rio Grande
Douglas C-39/DC-2	US	transport	5	1946-1958	
Douglas C-47/DC-3	US	transport	13	1949-1979	
Douglas C-54/DC-4	US	transport	5	1949-1978	
Embraer P-95 Banderulha	Brazil	maritime patrol	2	1982	Falklands War replaced P-2 Neptunes
Fleet Model 11 "Fleet"	US/Canada	trainer	10	1931-1940	
Fokker F-28	Netherlands	transport	3	1979–present	Falklands War
Fokker D.VII	Germany	reconnaissance trainer	1	1918-1919	
Grumman F9F-2B Panther	US	embarked jet fighter	24	1958-1971	4 additional aircraft purchased as spares.
Grumman F9F-8T Cougar	US	embarked jet trainer	2	1962-1971	
Grumman Goose	US	Utility flying boat	6	1946-1956	some were used in the Antarctic
Grumman J2F Duck	US	embarked reconnaissance	4	1937-1958	on Veinticinco de Mayo class cruisers
Grumman S-2 Tracker	US	embarked Anti-submarine	7 (S-2A) 6 (S-2E) 3 (S-2G)	1962-1986(S-2A) 1978–present (S-2E/T)	5 converted by IAI to S-2T with turbo-props
Hawker Siddeley HS-125	UK	VIP	1	1972-1984	
Junkers W 34	Germany	Trainer	1	1934-?	
Lockheed L-188 Electra	US	transport Maritime Patrol Elint	3 L-188PF 4 L-188A (modified) 1 (converted)	1973-? 1983-1994 1985-1998	Falklands War: transports
Lockheed P-2 Neptune	US	ASW & maritime patrol	8 (P2V-5) 4 (SP-2E) 4 (SP-2H)	1958-1982	Falklands War: 2 SP-2H
Lockheed P-3B Orion	US	ASW/maritime patrol	6	1997–present	
Luscombe 8E Silvaire	US	trainer	3	1949–1965	Transferred to air clubs. One later preserved at MUAN.
Macchi M.7	Italy	fighter flying boat	2	1919-1924	
Macchi M.9	Italy	bomber flying boat	2	1919-1928	
Martin B-10 WAN	US	land-based bomber	13	1937-1949	
Martin PBM Mariner	US	patrol flying boat	9	1954-1962	
North American SNJ-5C Texan	US	trainer	94	1949-1971	Two lost during 1955 Revolución Libertadora missions. On ARA Independencia from 1959
Nieuport 12	France	piston trainer	1	1918	
Pilatus PC-6/B-H2	Switzerland	utility aircraft	4		
Sud Fennec	France	piston trainer	65	1966-1979	Last 9 to Uruguayan Navy.
Supermarine Walrus	UK	reconnaissance amphibian	2 (315) 8 (Mk1)	1940-1948 1946-1958	
Supermarine Southampton	UK	patrol flying boat	6 (Mk III)	1929-1948	
Tellier T.3	France	flying boat	4	1918	French military mission aircraft borrowed by Argentine navy
Vickers Viking Mk.IV	UK	flying boat	4	1923-1932	
Vought O2U Corsair	US	embarked observation	?		
Vought F4U Corsair	US	embarked piston fighter	26	1956-1966	F4U-5/5N/5NL variants

== Rotary-wing aircraft ==
Aircraft	Origin	Type	#	In service	Notes
Alouette III	France	surface fleet helicopter	14	1960-2010	some participated in Falklands War, 1 lost.
Bell 47 G-4	US			1949-1968	
Bell UH-1H	US	utility helicopter	8	2000-2008	To support the Argentine Marines. One destroyed prior delivery. Five transferred to Argentine Army Aviation in 2010.
Eurocopter Fennec	France	surface fleet helicopter	4	1996–present	
Sikorsky Sea King	US/Italy	antisubmarine helicopter	5 S-61D4 2 AS-61D 2 AS-61H	1972–present	Also 3 UH-3H (plus 3+2 spares), 4 UH-3H (2008); Also used for Antarctic Support, and antiship on board ARA Hércules
Sikorsky S-51	US			1949-?	
Sikorsky S-55	US	Antarctic Support helicopter	3	1953-1971	
Sikorsky S-58	US	antisubmarine helicopter Antarctic Support			
Westland Sea Lynx Mk.23	UK	surface fleet helicopter	2	1978-1985	ten Mk.23/Mk.87 ordered, two delivered before the Falklands War, in which they operated. One lost in 1982.

== See also ==
- Argentine Naval Aviation
- Argentine air forces in the Falklands War
- List of aircraft of the Argentine Air Force
- List of active aircraft of the Argentine Air Force
- List of aircraft of the Argentine Army Aviation
