= List of aircraft of the Argentine Army Aviation =

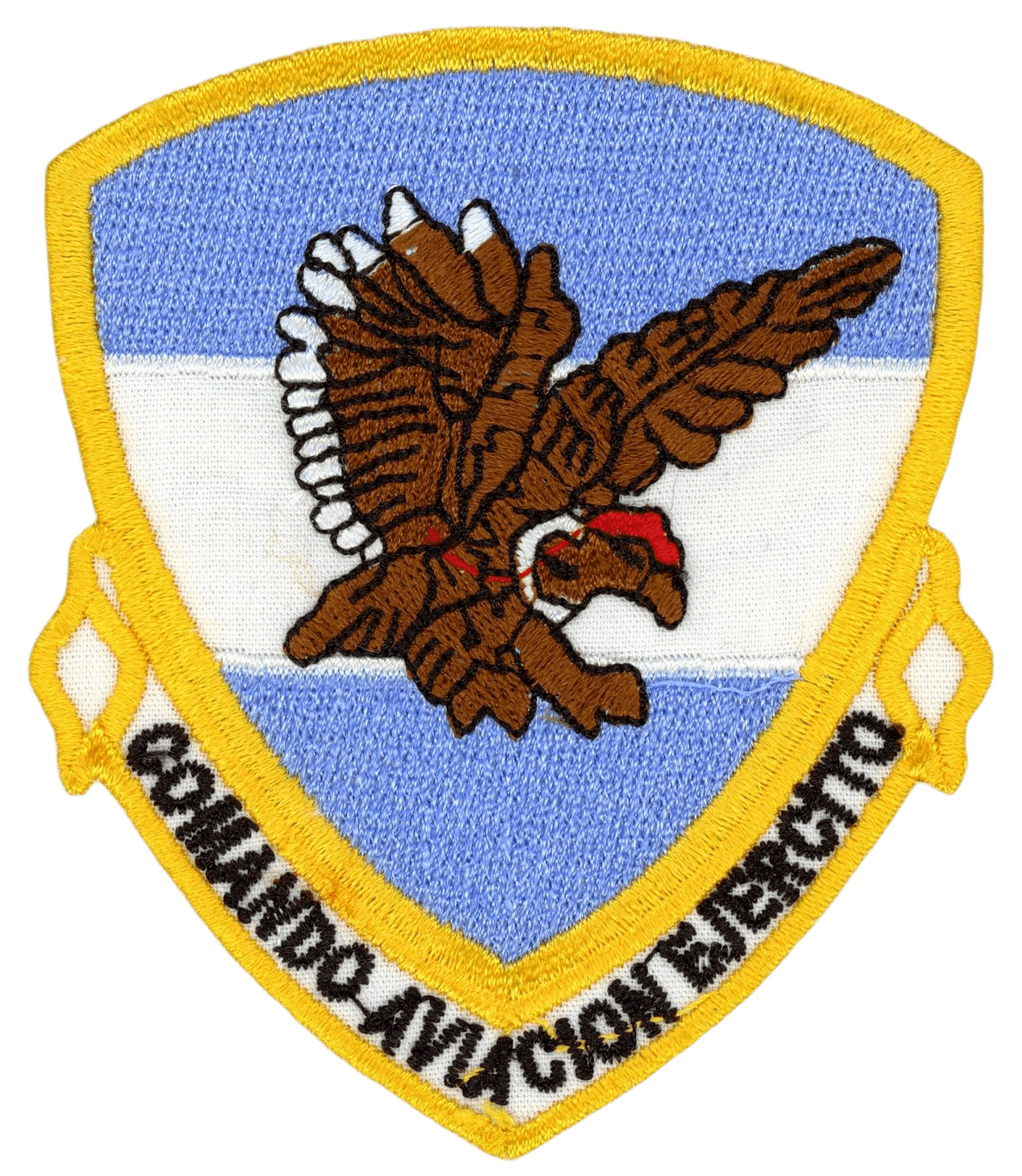
Badge of the Argentine Army Aviation Command

This is a list of all aircraft (fixed-wing and rotary-wing) operated by the Argentine Army Aviation command since its formation in 1956. For the current inventory please refer to the main article. Prototypes and aircraft evaluated but not used operationally are excluded.

== Fixed-wing aircraft ==
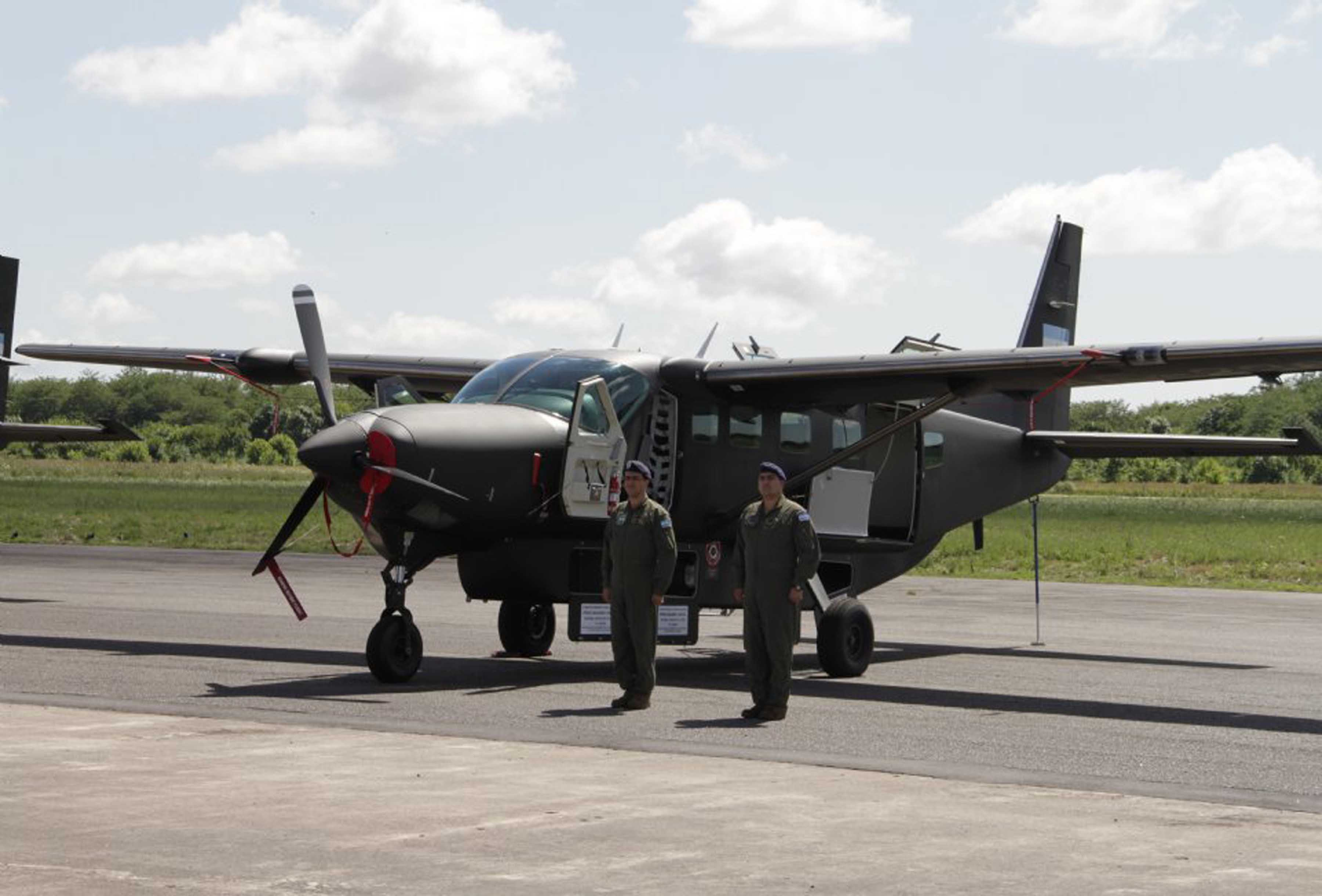
Cessna 208B Grand Caravan EX, Argentine Army, 2016

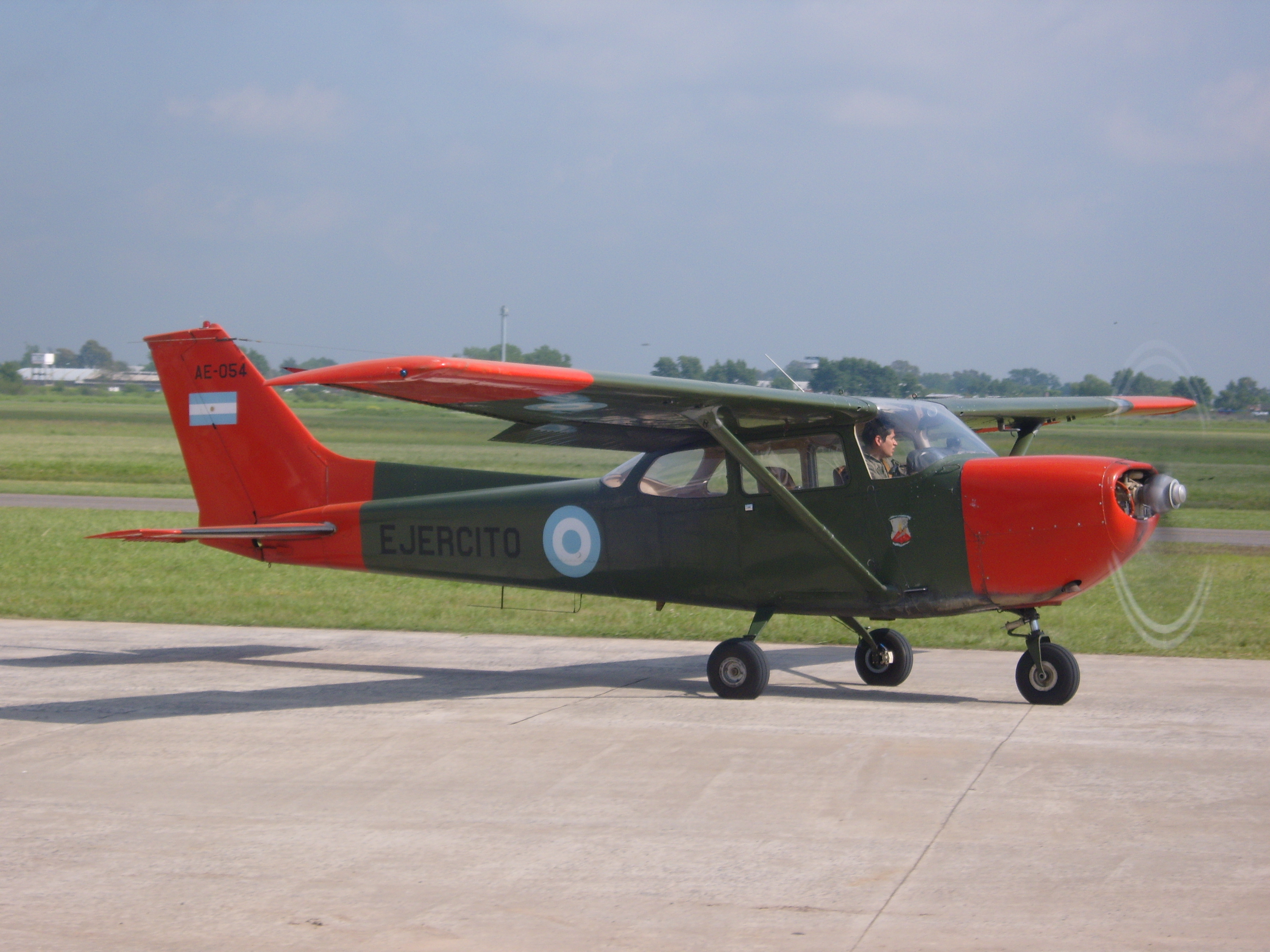
An Argentine Army Cessna T-41D Mescalero AE-054, in 2009

Aircraft	Origin	Type	Total #	In service	Notes
Aeritalia G.222	Italy	Transport	3	1977- 2015	Inactive, possibly retired as of late 2015.
Beechcraft Queen Air B65-80	US	Utility / light transport	1		
CASA C-212-200 Aviocar	Spain	Transport	2		
Cessna Grand Caravan EX 208	US	Utility	4	2015–present	Two purchased, and one delivered, in 2015. Two purchased and delivered in 2016.
Cessna 550 Citation Bravo	US	VIP transport	1	2015–present	
Cessna T-41D	US	Trainer	5		(Note: At least 10 T-41s according to other sources. See: Krivinyi, Nikolaus: "World Military Aviation", Arco Publishing Co, 1977. ISBN 0-668-04348-2)
Cessna U-17A	US	Utility/liaison			One (AE-205) preserved in Army Aviation Museum; used in Antarctic flights.
de Havilland Canada DHC-6 Twin Otter	Canada	Utility transport	1 DHC-6-200 1 DHC-6-300		
Diamond DA42 M	US	Multi-mission / surveillance	3	2016–present	Purchased to replace the OV-1Ds.
Douglas C-47/DC-3	US	Transport	15	1954-1960	Transferred to the Argentine Air Force in September 1960.
Fairchild SA-226 Merlin	US	Staff transport	1 Merlin IIIB 3 Merlin IVA		
Grumman OV-1D Mohawk	US	Observation / electronic intelligence	23	1992-2012	Additional two purchased for spares. As of late 2012 still 8 in strength, mostly inactive; all retired by 2015. (Note: According to Avialatina website, the last OV-1D (AE-039) was officially retired in November 2015.)
Rockwell Sabreliner 75A	US	VIP transport	1	1974–present	

== Rotary-wing aircraft ==
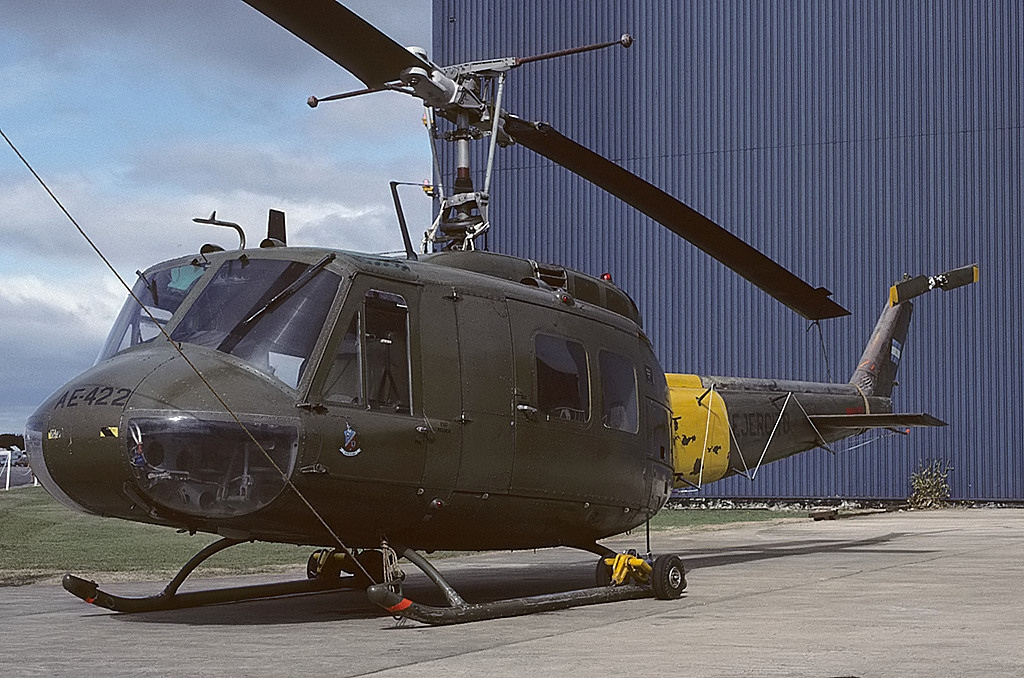
Bell UH-1H Huey of the Argentine Army

Aircraft	Origin	Type	Total #	In service	Notes
Aérospatiale SA 315 Lama	France	High-altitude search and rescue helicopter	6	1975–present	
Aérospatiale SA 330L Puma	France	Medium utility / transport helicopter	12	1978-1996	Five used in Falklands War, all lost.
Agusta A109A	Italy	Scout/light attack helicopter	9	1979-2011	Withdrawn from active service; last 3 stored at Campo de Mayo as of 2012.
Bell 47G	US	Utility, training helicopter	7	1965-1983	
Bell 206 B3	US	Utility / trainer helicopter	5		Used as a trainer in the Joint armed forces helicopter school. 15-20 helicopters to be purchased, ex-Italian Army and Carabineri.
Bell UH-1 Iroquois	US	Utility, transport helicopter	75	1967–present	Five transferred from the Argentine Navy Aviation in 2010. Nine lost in Falklands War.
Boeing CH-47 Chinook	US	Transport helicopter	2	1979-1982	Both lost during the Falklands War.
Cicaré CH-14	Argentina	Observation helicopter	1	2007–present	Prototype under development.
Eurocopter AS 332B Super Puma	France	Medium utility / transport helicopter	3		Used for Antarctic support.
Fairchild Hiller FH-1100	US	Light helicopter	9	1968-1979	
Hiller UH-12ET	US	Trainer helicopter	8	1980-2013	

== See also ==
- Argentine Army Aviation
- Argentine air forces in the Falklands War
- List of aircraft of the Argentine Air Force
- List of aircraft of the Argentine Naval Aviation
