= Royal Malaysian Navy Aviation =

Naval aviation branch of the Royal Malaysian Navy (RMN)

- KD Rajawali
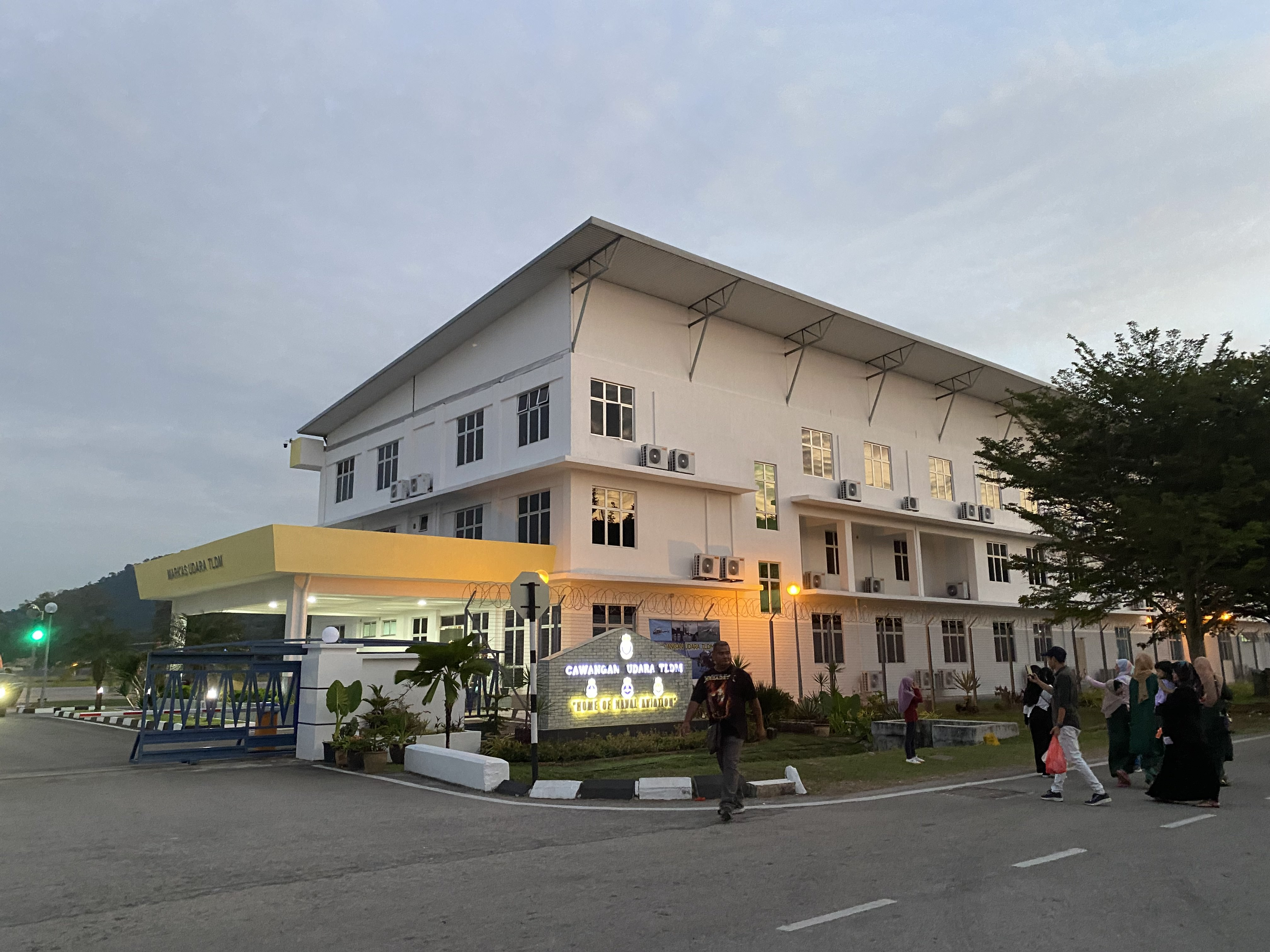
- Headquarters of the RMN Aviation
- Country: Malaysia
- Branch: Royal Malaysian Navy
- Type: Naval aviation
- Role: Aerial warfare Military supply chain management
- Size: 4 squadrons
- Part of: Malaysian Armed Forces
- Garrison/HQ: KD Rajawali, Lumut, Perak
- Colours

Insignia
- Roundel

The Royal Malaysian Navy Aviation is the naval aviation branch of the Royal Malaysian Navy (RMN). RMN aviation also known as the KD Rajawali. It was based in Lumut, Perak and currently consisted of four squadron.

== History ==
RMN aviation was unofficially formed in 1985 after nine of the RMN personnel graduated from flying school. Two years later, RMN purchased a batch of used Westland Wasp from Royal Navy as their first flying unit. The RMN aviation officially inaugurated on 11 May 1990 by the third Chief of Navy, Laksamana Madya Tan Sri Abdul Wahab Bin Haji Nawi and RMN aviation now officially known as the KD Rajawali.

RMN aviation moving further by acquiring the new assets and expanding their squadron to fulfil the modern tasks. This includes the acquisition of modern anti-submarine and anti-surface helicopter-Super Lynx, light attack and surface surveillance helicopter-Fennec and utility helicopter-AW139. RMN aviation also formed it first unmanned aerial vehicle (UAV) squadron by acquiring ScanEagle UAV.

== Units ==
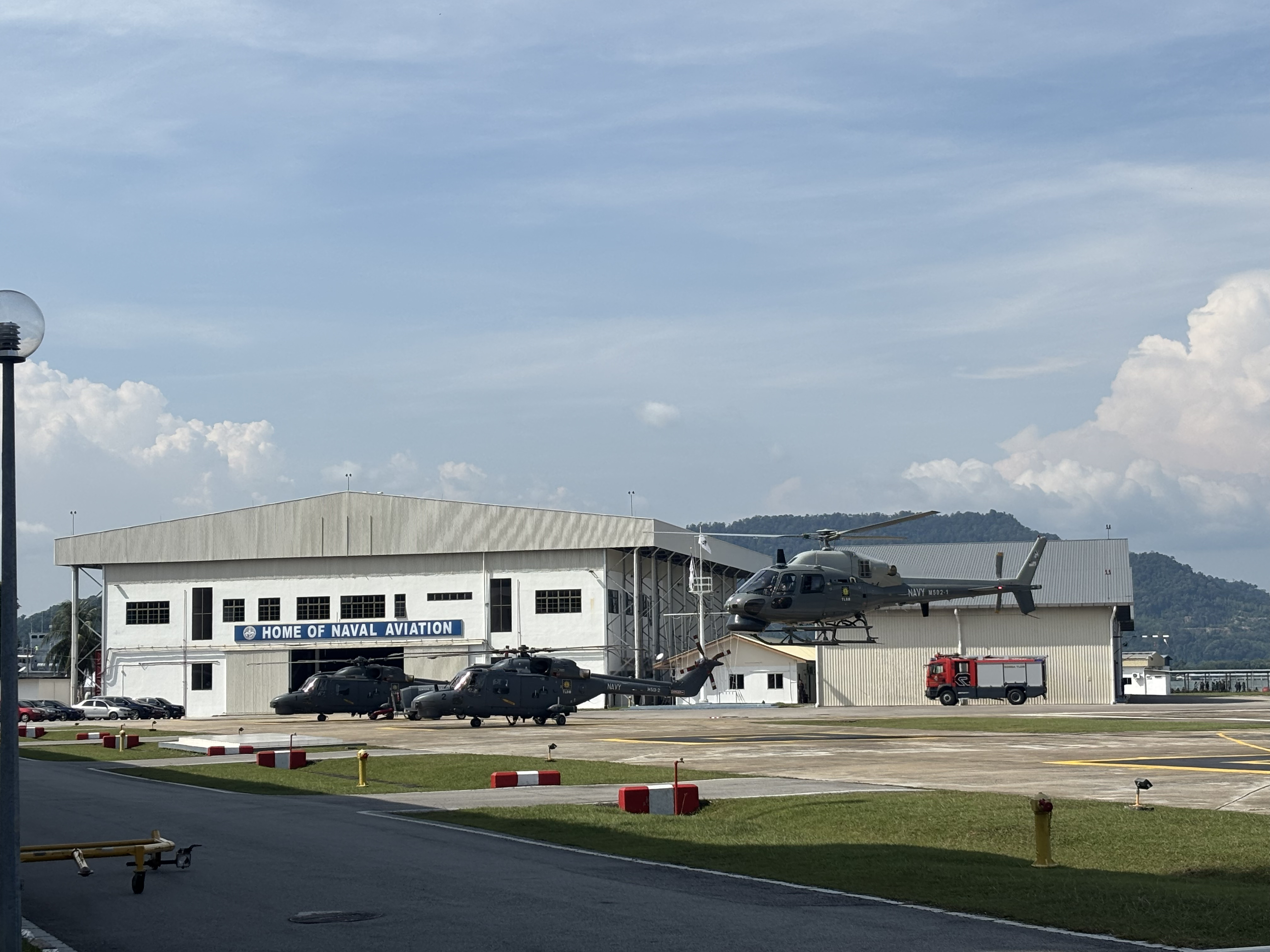
RMN helicopters in action in May 2026

Currently, RMN aviation consisted of four squadron which is three squadron of helicopter: 501, 502 and 503. One squadron of unmanned aerial vehicle: 601.

- 501 Squadron

Equipped with Super Lynx helicopter. The main roles of this squadron are to fulfil the anti-submarine and anti-surface warfare. The Super Lynx equipped with A244-S torpedoes for anti-submarine and Sea Skua missiles for anti-surface.

- 502 Squadron 'Agile Et Fute'

Equipped with Fennec helicopter for surface surveillance and light attack roles. The Fennec equipped with Telephonics 1500 radar and FLIR LEO II for surveillance task. It can also be equipped with rocket launcher for light attack task.

- 503 Squadron 'Monoluku Momurias'

Equipped with AW139 helicopter.

- 601 Squadron

Equipped with ScanEagle UAV for surveillance duties.

== Lumut crash ==
On 23 April 2024 two RMN helicopters (a Eurocopter Fennec and an AgustaWestland AW139) crashed during a military parade rehearsal for the Navy's 90th anniversary on 27 April. 10 people were killed including the pilot and crew of both helicopters and the commanding officers of 503 Squadron and 502 Squadron.

== See also ==
- Malaysian Army Aviation
