= Eurocopter Fennec =

Helicopter in France

AS550 Fennec AS555 Fennec 2
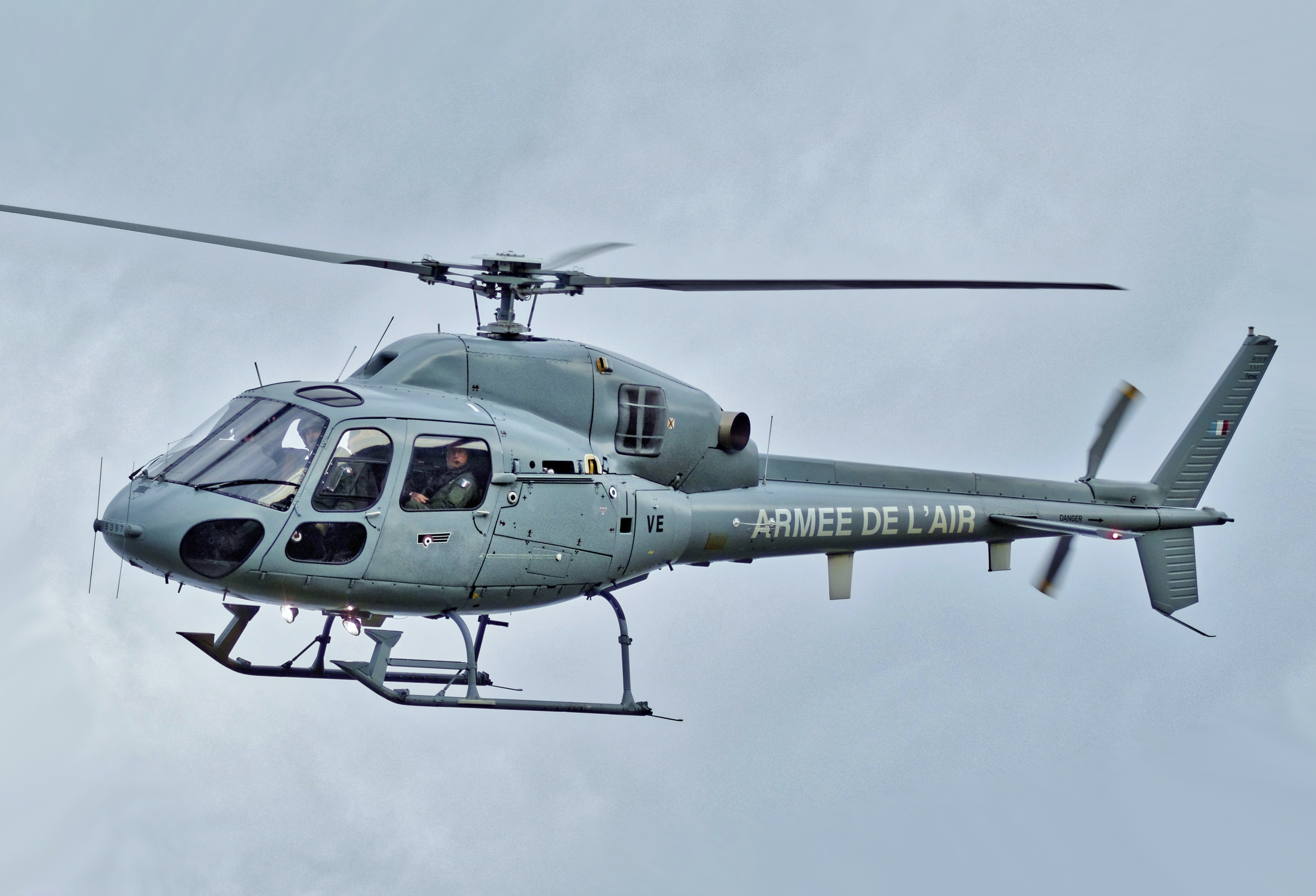
- A Fennec of the French Air and Space Force

General information
- Type: Light utility military helicopter
- National origin: France
- Manufacturer: Aérospatiale; Eurocopter; Airbus Helicopters
- Status: In service
- Primary users: French Army Light Aviation French Air and Space Force; Argentine Naval Aviation; Royal Danish Air Force; Indonesian Army Aviation Center; Royal Malaysian Navy Aviation; Pakistan Army Aviation Corps

History
- Manufactured: 1990–present
- Introduction date: 1990
- Developed from: Eurocopter AS350 Écureuil; Eurocopter AS355 Écureuil 2

The Airbus Helicopters H125M Fennec (formerly Eurocopter AS550) and AS555 Fennec 2 are lightweight, multipurpose military helicopters manufactured by Airbus Helicopters (formerly Eurocopter Group). Based on the AS350 Ecureuil and AS355 Ecureuil 2 series, they are named after the fennec fox. The armed versions of the AS550 and AS555 can be fitted with coaxial weapons, rockets, torpedoes and various other munitions.

== Design ==
The Fennec's design is centered around its lightweight and compact structure, making it an ideal fit for deployment on ships with helipads, such as destroyers or aircraft carriers. This allows for greater flexibility in mission planning and execution, as the Fennec can be easily transported and deployed from a variety of naval vessels.

The Fennec comes in two distinct variants, each catering to different operational requirements. The single-engine variant is optimized for simplicity, reliability, and reduced maintenance, making it an excellent choice for smaller-scale operations or special forces missions. In contrast, the dual-engine variant offers increased power and redundancy, making it better suited for more demanding missions, such as heavy-lift transport or combat operations.

== Operational history ==
As a result of the Vienna Treaty, military variants of the Écureuil were marketed under a separate designation; thus from 1990 onwards the type was marketed as the Fennec.

AS555 helicopters were delivered to French Air Force between February 1988 and March 1994, and as of 2018, 40 of them remain operable. 17 AS555 Fennecs were delivered to the ALAT in January 1990 and were assigned to the 6th Squadron of Utility Helicopters at the Le Luc Training School, used for training and liaison missions.

Twelve AS550 C2helicopters were purchased by the Royal Danish Air Force in 1987, with the first helicopters delivered on August 1990. Due to a change in the geopolitical environment following the collapse of the Soviet Union and the end of the Cold War, the Fennec helicopters were gradually repurposed for other tasks, primarily observation and light transport duties. In 2003, they were primarily employed by the Eskadrille 724. In 2002, 3 Danish Fennec helicopters were deployed to Macedonia during Operation Amber Fox. In December 2005, Fennec helicopters were deployed to support the Danish forces in Iraq and from August 2007, 4 more were deployed to the troubled country as a replacement for the withdrawn ground troops. In 2008, 4 Fennec helicopters were deployed to the Danish forces in Afghanistan. As a result of various defense agreements, the number of active Fennecs in the Air Force has been reduced to 8 in 2006.

In 1992, four AS555 AF Fennecs were delivered to the Mexican Navy.

AS555 Fennec helicopters were acquired by the Argentine Navy following the circumstances caused by the Falklands War, as United Kingdom had blocked the sales of Westland Sea Lynx to Argentina. Although they had acquired two of ten Lynx helicopters ordered, the first one was accidentally decommissioned during the 1982 conflict and the second one was sold to Denmark after being unable to acquire parts to keep it operational. Due to limited military budget, the Eurocopter AS555-SN Fennec was chosen to succeed the Lynx, with first four AS555-SN units arriving in 1996.

In February 2007, India selected the AS550 C3 Fennec over the Bell 407 helicopter in a deal for 197 helicopters worth US$500 million. This deal was suspended in June 2007 because of concerns of alleged corruption in the bidding process, and cancelled outright on 6 December 2007. The contract is now being re-competed, and the AS550 C3 is among the helicopters competing for the deal. However India chose the Kamov Ka-226T over the AS550 C3 in the refreshed tender.

On 20 January 2011, Royal Malaysian Navy PASKAL commandos rescued a hijacked Malaysian chemical tanker and its crew from Somali pirates. A Fennec helicopter provided reconnaissance and aerial gunfire to keep the pirate mother ship at bay while the commandos boarded the tanker.

== Variants ==
Single engine

- AS350 L1/L2 Ecureuil – Original military variants of AS350.
- AS550 C2 Fennec – Armed version based on AS350 B2.
- AS550 U2 Fennec – Unarmed version based on AS350 B2.
- AS550 C3 Fennec – Armed version based on AS350 B3.

Twin engine

- AS355 M/M2 Ecureuil 2 – Original military variants of AS355 F.
- AS555 AF Fennec 2 – Armed version based on AS355 N.
- AS555 AN Fennec 2 – Armed military version, can be fitted with a 20 mm cannon.
- AS555 AR Fennec 2 – Armed with cannon and rockets.
- AS555 MN Fennec 2 – Unarmed naval version.
- AS555 MR Fennec 2 – Naval version.
- AS555 SN Fennec 2 – Armed naval version.
- AS555 SR Fennec 2 – Armed naval version.
- AS555 UN Fennec 2 – Training and utility version.
- AS555 UR Fennec 2 – Utility version.
- AS555 SP Fennec 2 – Naval version of AS355 NP.

== Operators ==
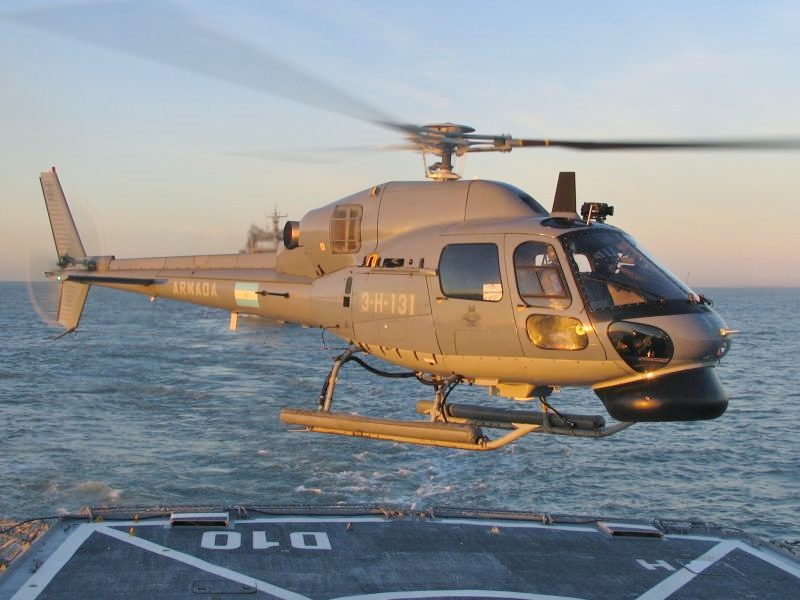
An Argentine Navy AS555 SN Fennec 2

Argentina

- Argentine Naval Aviation

Brazil

- Brazilian Air Force
- Brazilian Army
- Brazilian Naval Aviation

Chad

- Chadian Air Force

Colombia

- Colombian Navy

Denmark

- Royal Danish Air Force

Ecuador

- Ecuadorian Army

France

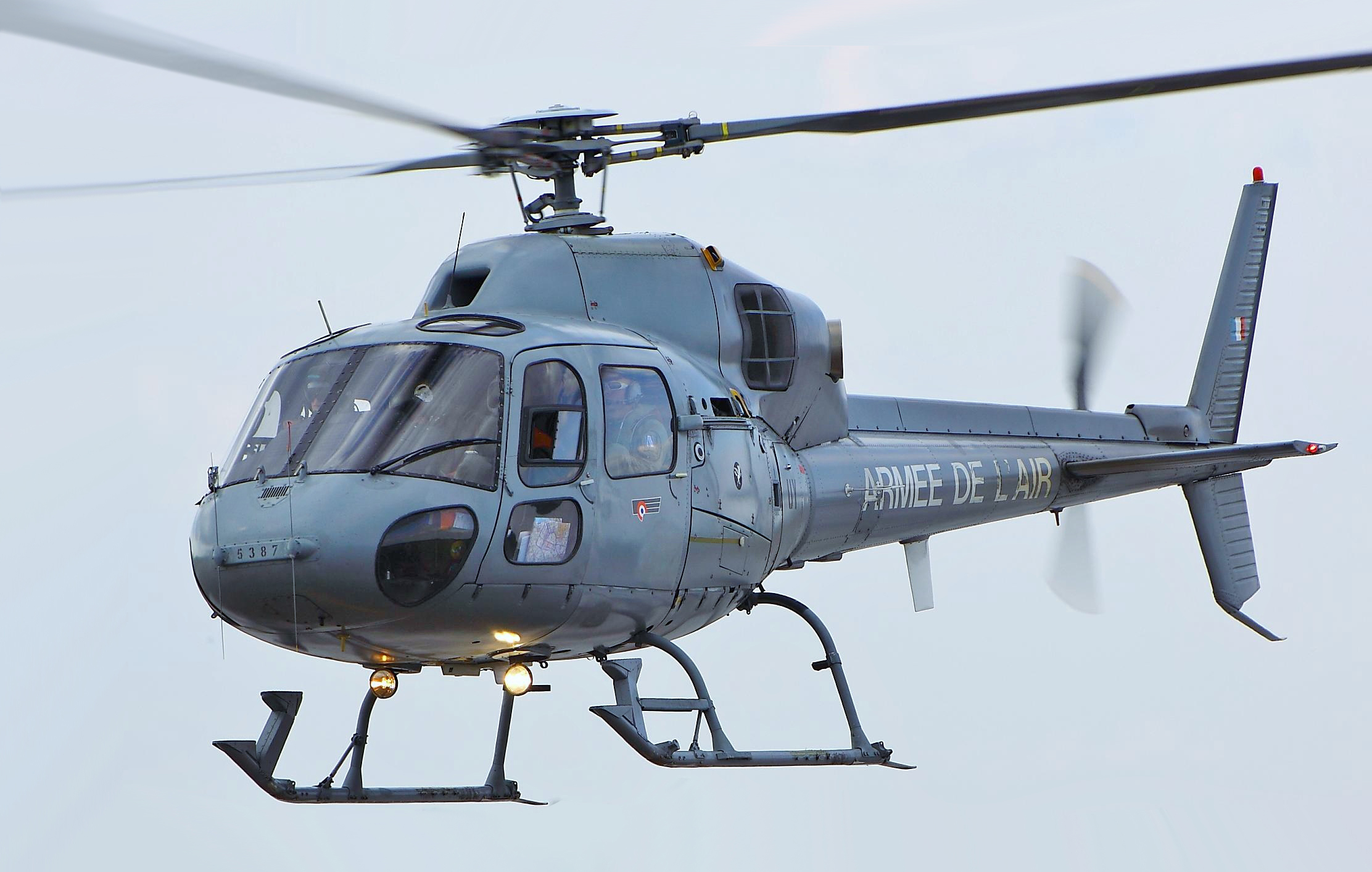
An Armée de l'air AS555

- French Air and Space Force
- French Army Light Aviation

Indonesia

- Indonesian Army

Kenya

- Kenya Air Force

Malaysia

- Royal Malaysian Navy Aviation

Mexico

- Mexican Naval Aviation

Pakistan

- Pakistan Army Aviation Corps

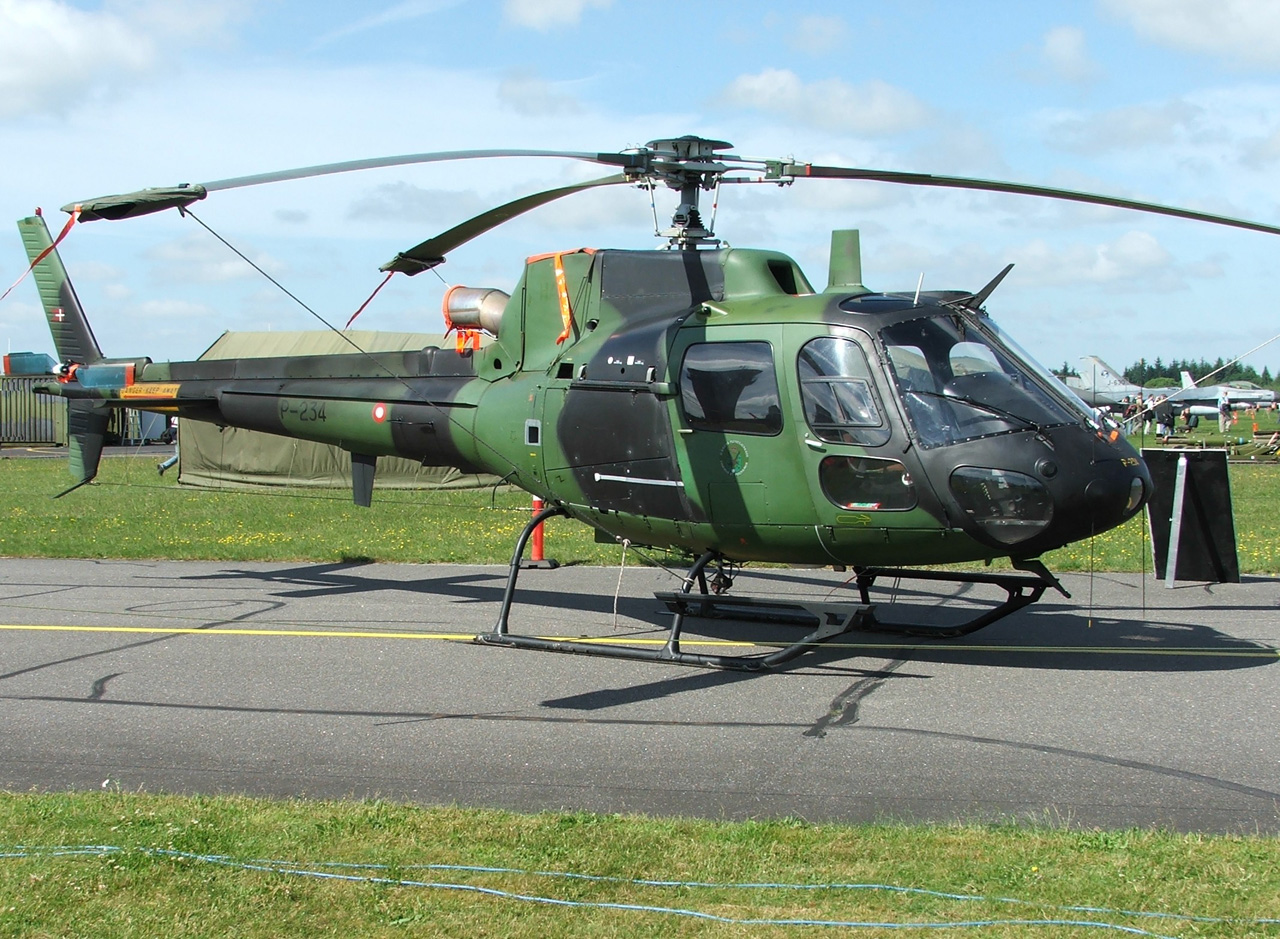
A Danish Air Force AS550 C2 Fennec

Qatar

- Qatar Emiri Air Force.

Tanzania

- Tanzania Air Force Command

Thailand

- Royal Thai Army

Uzbekistan

- Uzbekistan Air and Air Defence Forces

=== Former operators ===
Singapore

- Republic of Singapore Air Force

== Notable accidents ==
- On 23 April 2024, a Royal Malaysian Navy (RMN) AS555 SN Fennec 2 with three crew onboard collided with an RMN AgustaWestland AW139 with seven crew at the Royal Malaysian Navy base in Lumut, Perak. One of the helicopter's rotors clipped the other's, causing both to crash. The Fennec crashed into a swimming pool at the stadium's sports complex. The incident occurred during a training flight in preparation for the 90th Naval Day celebration. All ten crew were killed in the crash.

== Specifications (AS550 C3) ==
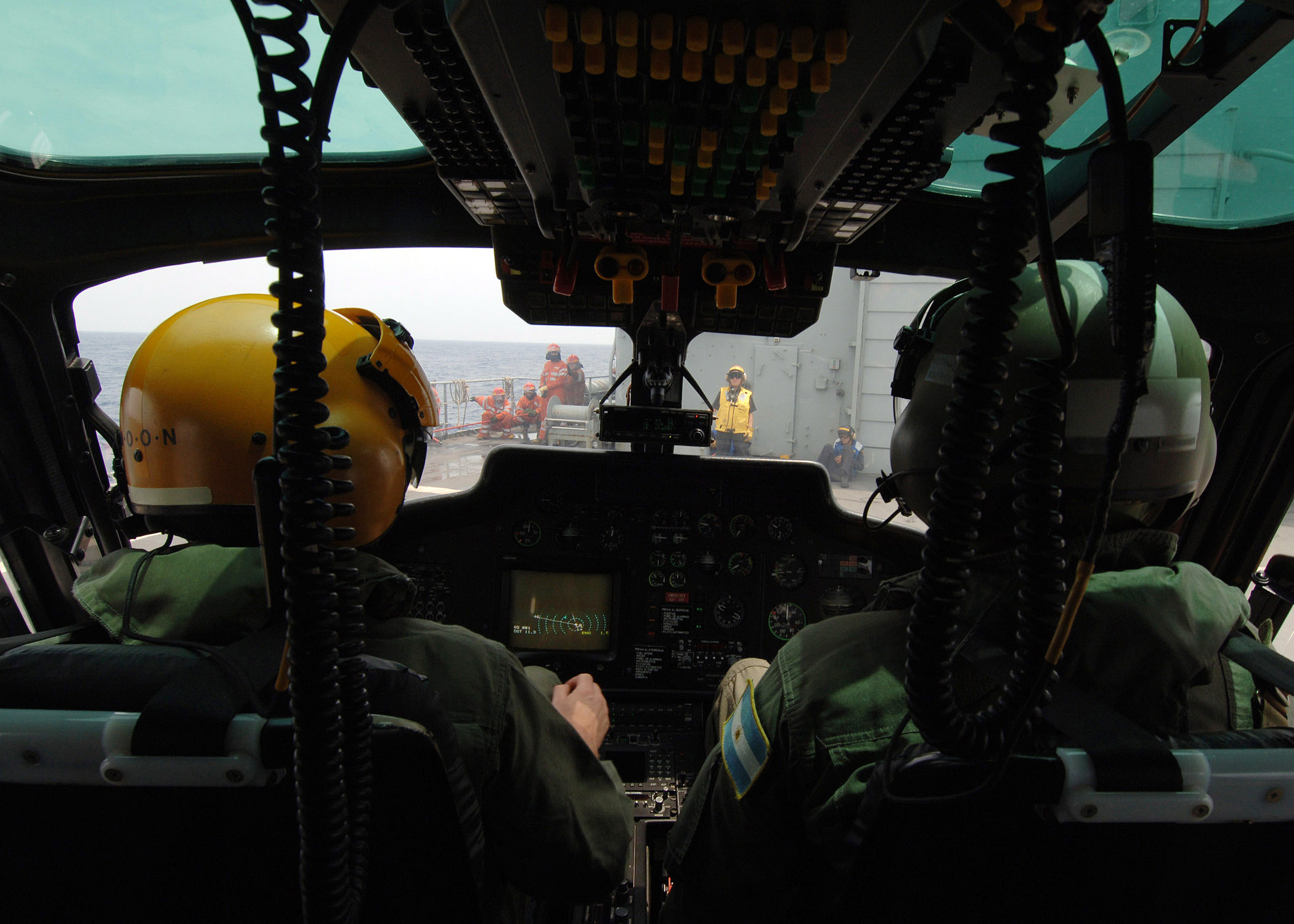
The cockpit of an AS 555

Data from Jane's All The World's Aircraft 2003–2004

General characteristics

- Crew: 2
- Capacity: 4 passengers
- Length: 10.93 m (35 ft 10 in) (fuselage length), 12.94 m (42 ft 6 in) (overall length, rotors turning)
- Height: 3.34 m (10 ft 11 in)
- Empty weight: 1,220 kg (2,690 lb)
- Max takeoff weight: 2,250 kg (4,960 lb)
- Fuel capacity: 540 L (143 US Gal)
- Powerplant: 1 × Turbomeca Arriel 2B turboshaft, 632 kW (847 shp) (limited to 500 kW (671 shp for take-off))
- Main rotor diameter: 10.69 m (35 ft 1 in)
- Main rotor area: 89.75 m^{2} (966.1 sq ft)
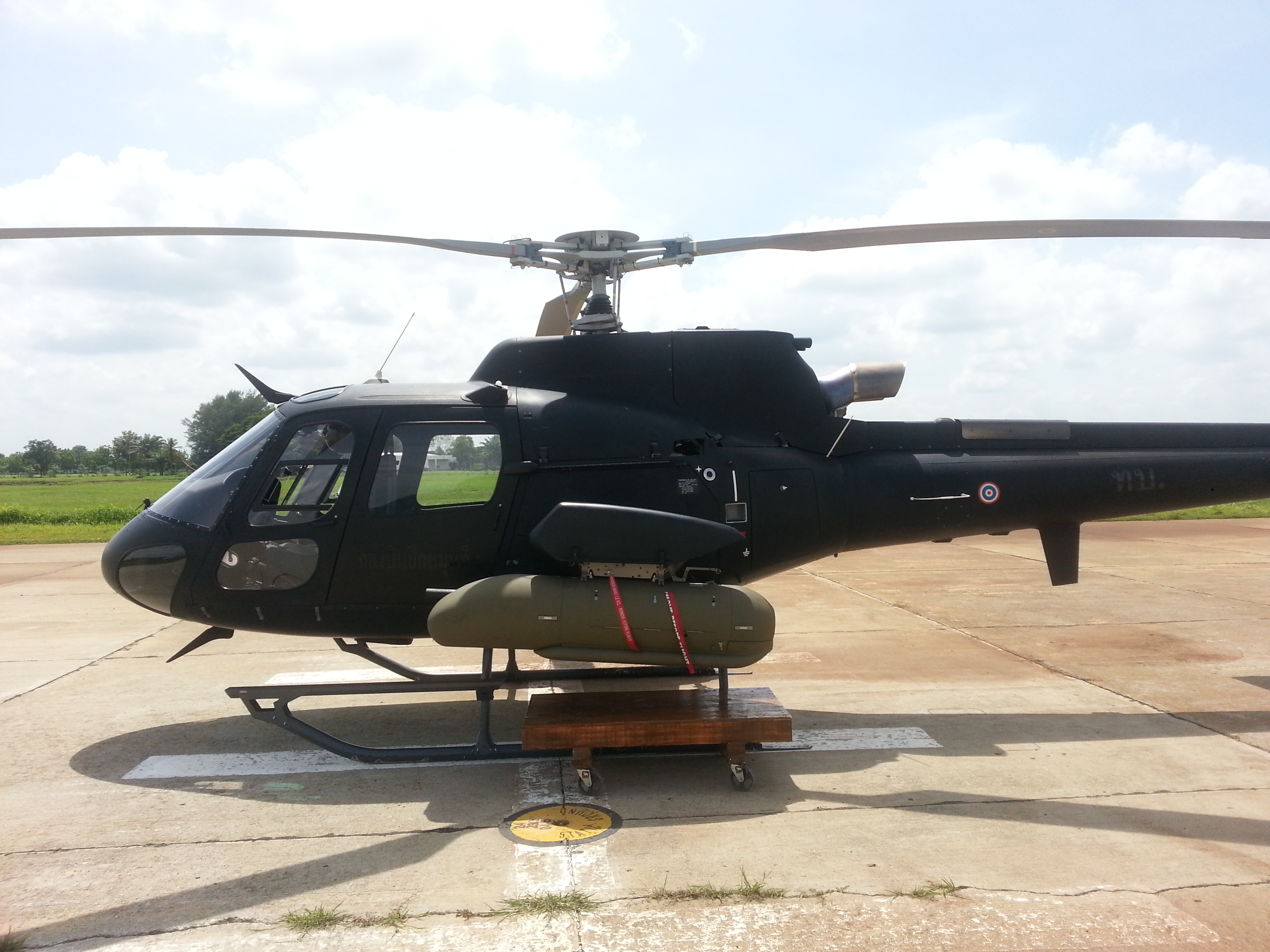
  Royal Thai Army AS550 armed with .50" HMP POD

Performance

- Maximum speed: 246 km/h (153 mph, 133 kn) (max cruise)
- Never exceed speed: 287 km/h (178 mph, 155 kn)
- Range: 648 km (403 mi, 350 nmi)
- Service ceiling: 5,280 m (17,320 ft)
- Rate of climb: 10.30 m/s (2,028 ft/min)

Armament
Provision for:

- 20 mm Giat M621 cannon
- Fabrique Nationale de Herstal twin 7.62 mm or 12.7 mm machine gun pods
- 7 x 70mm (2.75") Forges de Zeebrugge rocket launcher FZ220 or 12 x 68 mm Thales Brandt rockets
- BGM-71 TOW anti-tank missiles

== See also ==
Related development

- Eurocopter AS350 Écureuil
- Eurocopter AS355 Écureuil 2
- Eurocopter EC130
- Changhe Z-11

Aircraft of comparable role, configuration, and era

- Bell 206
- Bell 407
- MD Helicopters MD 500
- Eurocopter EC635
- PZL SW-4
