= Argentine Naval Aviation =

- Comando de la Aviación Naval Argentina
- Argentine Naval Aviation patch
- Active: 1916 – present
- Country: Argentina
- Branch: Argentine Navy
- Type: Naval aviation
- Size: c. 20 aircraft
- Part of: Navy; Ministry of Defense
- Engagements: Falklands War (Spanish: Guerra de las Malvinas); Gulf War
- Website: argentina.gob.ar/aviacionnaval

Commanders
- Commander-in-Chief: President
- Chief of Staff of the Navy: Admiral
- Chief of COAN: Rear Admiral Eduardo Miguel Tourné

Insignia
- Roundel

- Former roundel

The Argentine Naval Aviation (Spanish: Comando de la Aviación Naval Argentina, COAN) is the naval aviation branch of the Argentine Navy and one of its four operational commands. Argentina, along with Brazil is one of two South American countries to have operated two aircraft carriers.

The acronym CANA is often used in English language bibliographies, but is not correct Spanish usage.

== History ==
=== Formation and World Wars ===
COAN's origin can be traced to 22 October 1912 when a navy officer, Lt Melchor Escola, graduated as a pilot. On 11 February 1916 the naval air station school Fuerte Barragan was created near La Plata and the anniversary of this is marked as Naval Aviation Day. In September 1917 three naval lieutenants were sent to the US Naval Air Station Pensacola from which they were subsequently deployed to Europe to participate in World War I.

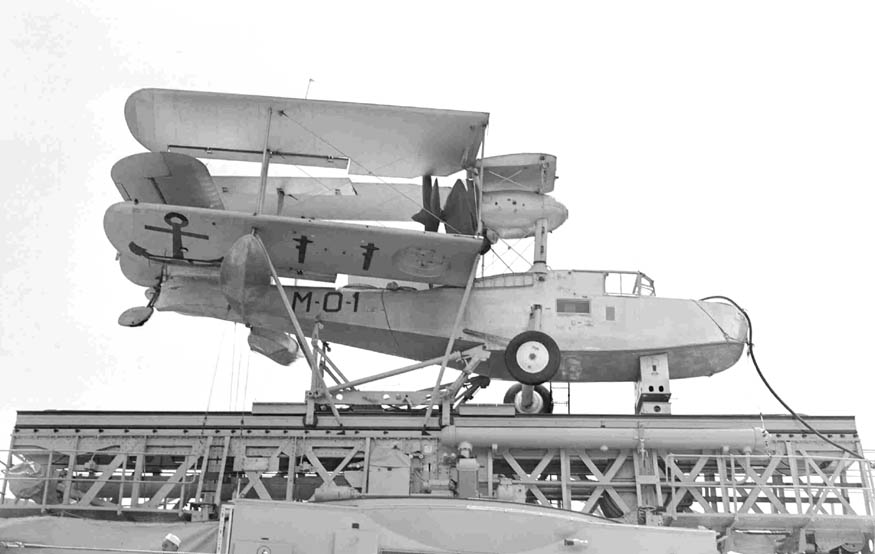
Argentine Navy Supermarine Walrus MK-IV on board cruiser La Argentina, San Francisco, 1940

COAN was officially established on 17 October 1919 as the Naval Air Service. Over the following years, the COAN operated a variety of aircraft, mainly advanced trainer types imported from the USA including the North American AT-6 Texan, the Beechcraft AT-11 and the Consolidated PBY Catalina. Sikorsky S-51 helicopters joined the service shortly after the war in 1949.

=== Early combat operations ===
The COAN received a baptism by fire on 16 June 1955 when naval airplanes took part in the bombing of Plaza de Mayo in the course of an attempted military coup. Three aircraft were shot down: one by an loyal Argentine Air Force Gloster Meteor in air-to-air combat and two others by anti-aircraft guns. A Grumman J2F was shot down over the town of Saavedra on 18 September that year.

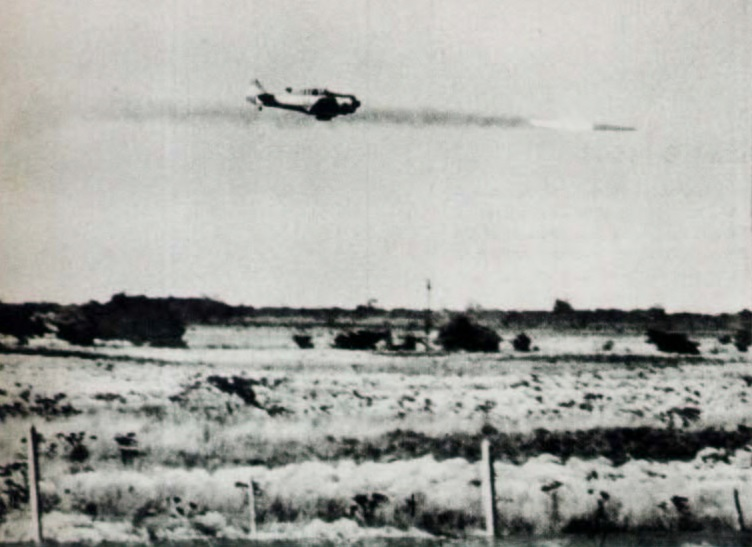
A rebel AT-6 combat trainer attacks a column of vehicles, 1963

Navy pilots saw combat again during 1962–63 internal military fighting between factions known as Azules y colorados (blue and reds), culminating in the 1963 Argentine Navy Revolt in which Navy Grumman F9F Panthers and Vought F4U Corsairs bombed Argentine Army tanks in defense of the Navy base of Punta Indio.

=== A carrier navy ===
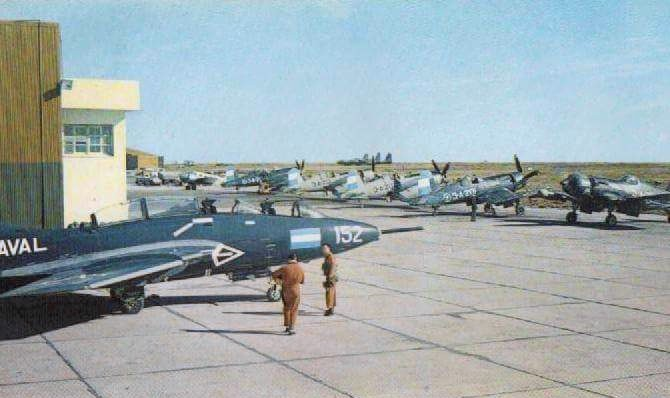
F9F Cougar and F4U Corsairs, BACE, 1960s.

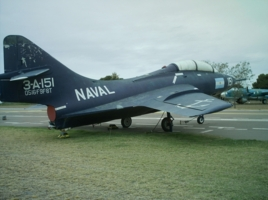
Grumman F9F Cougar

A great change came into effect when the Navy received its first aircraft carrier, ARA Independencia, a modernised British Colossus-class light aircraft carrier, in 1959. At the time, her aircraft inventory included the F4U Corsair, SNJ-5Cs Texan and Grumman S2F-1 (S-2A) Trackers. The Navy also had F9F Panther and Grumman F9F Cougar jets but the carrier was not suitable for operating them, although they were embarked on the carrier during their delivery voyage from the United States to Argentina. The Cougar was the first jet to break the sound barrier in Argentina. These jets would be involved in the general mobilization during the 1965 border dispute between Argentina and Chile but no combat occurred.

The naval training force received T-28 Trojans, T-34 Mentors and Aermacchi MB-326 jets which would be later reinforced with the more powerful MB-339.

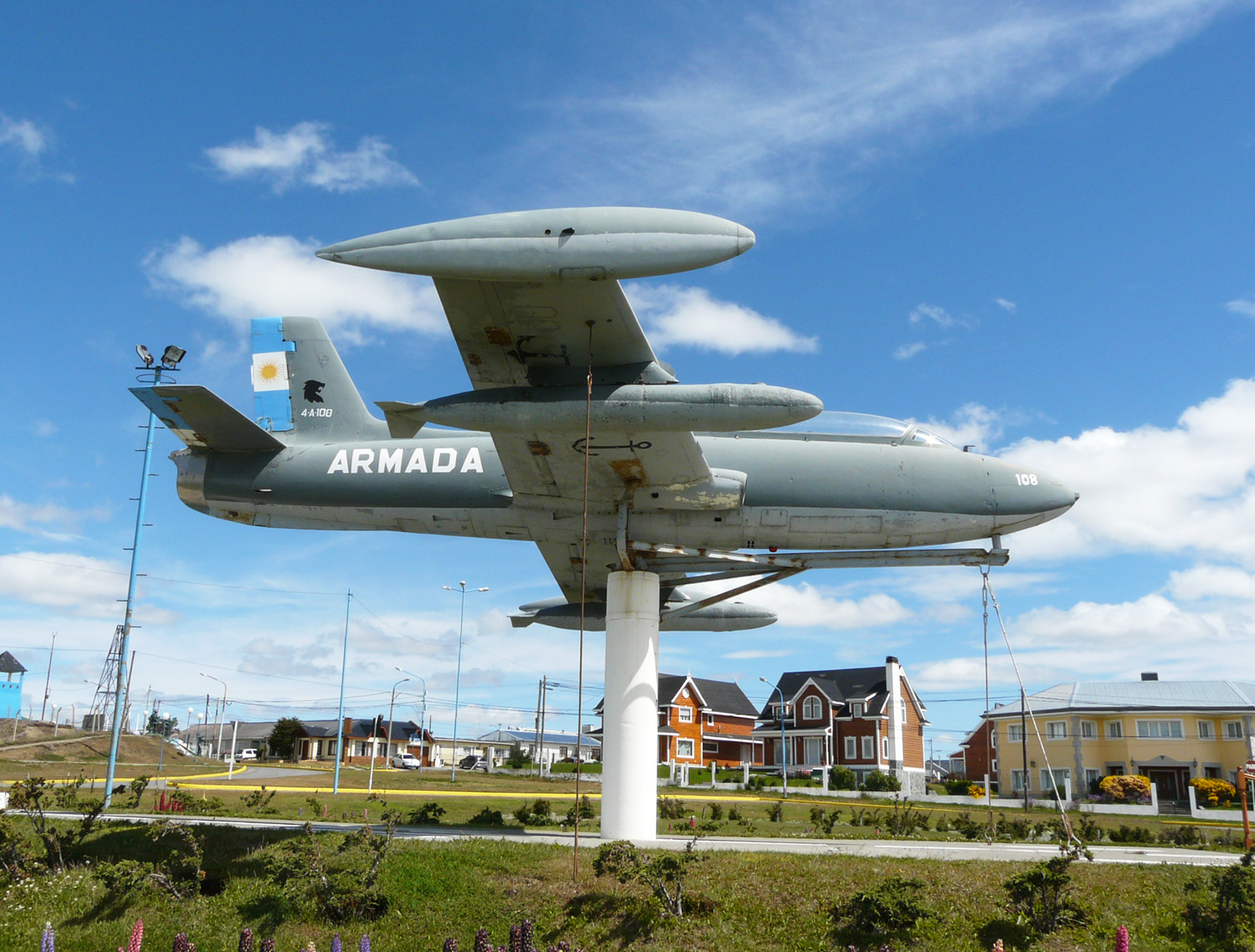
Aermacchi MB326 at Rio Grande

More aircraft entered service during the 1960s, including the C-47 Dakota (which were extensively used in Antarctica including the first national landing on the South Pole made in 1962 by Captain Hermes Quijada who departed from Ellsworth Station), Sikorsky S-55 helicopters and shore based aircraft Lockheed P-2 Neptunes for maritime patrol duties.

In 1969 the Navy received her second carrier, ARA Veinticinco de Mayo, another Colossus class carrier but with a more powerful catapult, from the Netherlands. On her voyage home, the British company Hawker Siddeley demonstrated its Harrier GR1 but the Argentines opted for the Douglas A-4Q Skyhawk instead. More helicopters were incorporated into the new carrier, the Alouette III and the Sikorsky SH-3 Sea King, and also the more advanced S-2E variant of the Tracker. Cargo planes Fokker F-28 and Lockheed L-188 Electra modified for maritime patrol were also added.

The 1970s surface fleet modernization plan included the purchase of Type 42 destroyers (one built in Britain one in Argentina) with their complement of Westland Sea Lynx helicopters but their use would be affected by the upcoming events.

In 1972 aircraft changed the word Naval to Armada painted on them.^{pictorial}

=== The military junta ===
In 1976, a military junta took power in Argentina and initiated a state-sponsored campaign of violence known as the Dirty War. Naval aviators were used to toss political prisoners (the "disappeared") into the River Plate, in the infamous Death flights. In 1978, tension with Chile reached the highest point when the Argentine junta initiated Operation Soberanía, a planned invasion of disputed territory in Tierra del Fuego. The war was avoided at the last minute by the intervention of pope John Paul II. By 1982, in order to maintain power by diverting public attention from the nation's poor economic performance and exploiting the long-standing feelings of the Argentines towards the Falkland Islands (Spanish: Islas Malvinas), the Junta ordered an invasion and triggered the ten-week-long Falklands War (Spanish: Guerra de las Malvinas).

=== Falklands War ===
The naval aviation, suffering an arms embargo since 1978 by US President Jimmy Carter for human rights abuses applying the Kennedy Amendment, (Note: Backing the Humphrey-Kennedy amendment to the Foreign Assistance Act of 1976, the Carter administration placed an embargo on the sale of arms and spare parts to Argentina and on the training of its military personnel.) was in the middle of the process of replacing their Skyhawks with French-built Dassault-Breguet Super Étendards. The planes used AM39 Exocet anti-shipping missiles, also purchased from France, to sink the Royal Navy's HMS Sheffield and the support ship Atlantic Conveyor. The older A-4Qs also had a role, destroying HMS Ardent.

On the eve of war the Argentine carrier ARA Veinticinco de Mayo attempted to launch a wave of A-4Q Skyhawk jets against the Royal Navy Task Force after her S-2 Trackers detected the British fleet. However, what might have been the first battle between aircraft carriers since World War II did not occur, as poor winds prevented the heavily loaded jets from taking off. (Note: "He hoped to be able to fly off six Skyhawks with a 240-mile combat radius and each armed with six 250kg bombs. He needed 40 knots of wind to be able to achieve this. At 22.00 the wind started to drop. He now calculated that it would take until 06.00 before he could be in a position to mount the attack. Two hours later at midnight the wind had dropped further....It was now estimated that an attack would not be possible.."- Freedman, Lawrence: Signals of war (1990) Faber and Faber. ISBN 0-571-14144-7) After the British nuclear-powered submarine HMS Conqueror sank the cruiser ARA General Belgrano, the carrier returned to port for safety and her Skyhawks began their attacks from mainland Argentina instead.

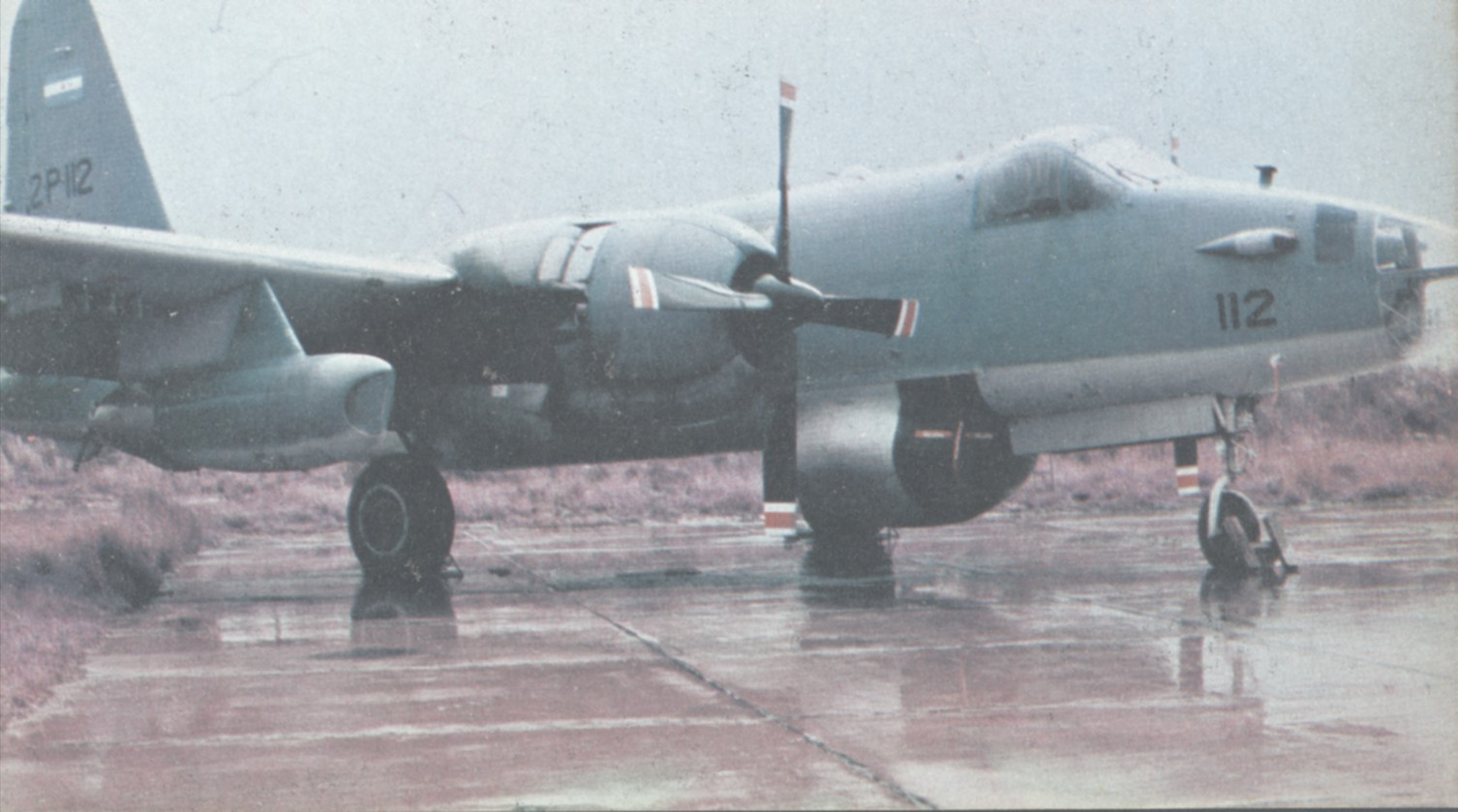
The Argentine Navy SP-2H which tracked HMS Sheffield

Navy's T-34s and MB-339s, along with Air Force's Pucarás, were the only combat aircraft based on the islands and an MB-339 was the first aircraft to engage the British landing force during the Battle of San Carlos.

During the war the last two SP-2H Neptunes were retired due to airframe attrition and replaced with two leased Brazilian EMB 111 Bandeirantes.

Four naval aviators died in the war. (Note: Lieutenants Zubizarreta, Márquez (both A-4Q pilots) Benítez & Miguel (MB339s)) Fourteen aircraft were lost, to various causes.

=== Post war ===
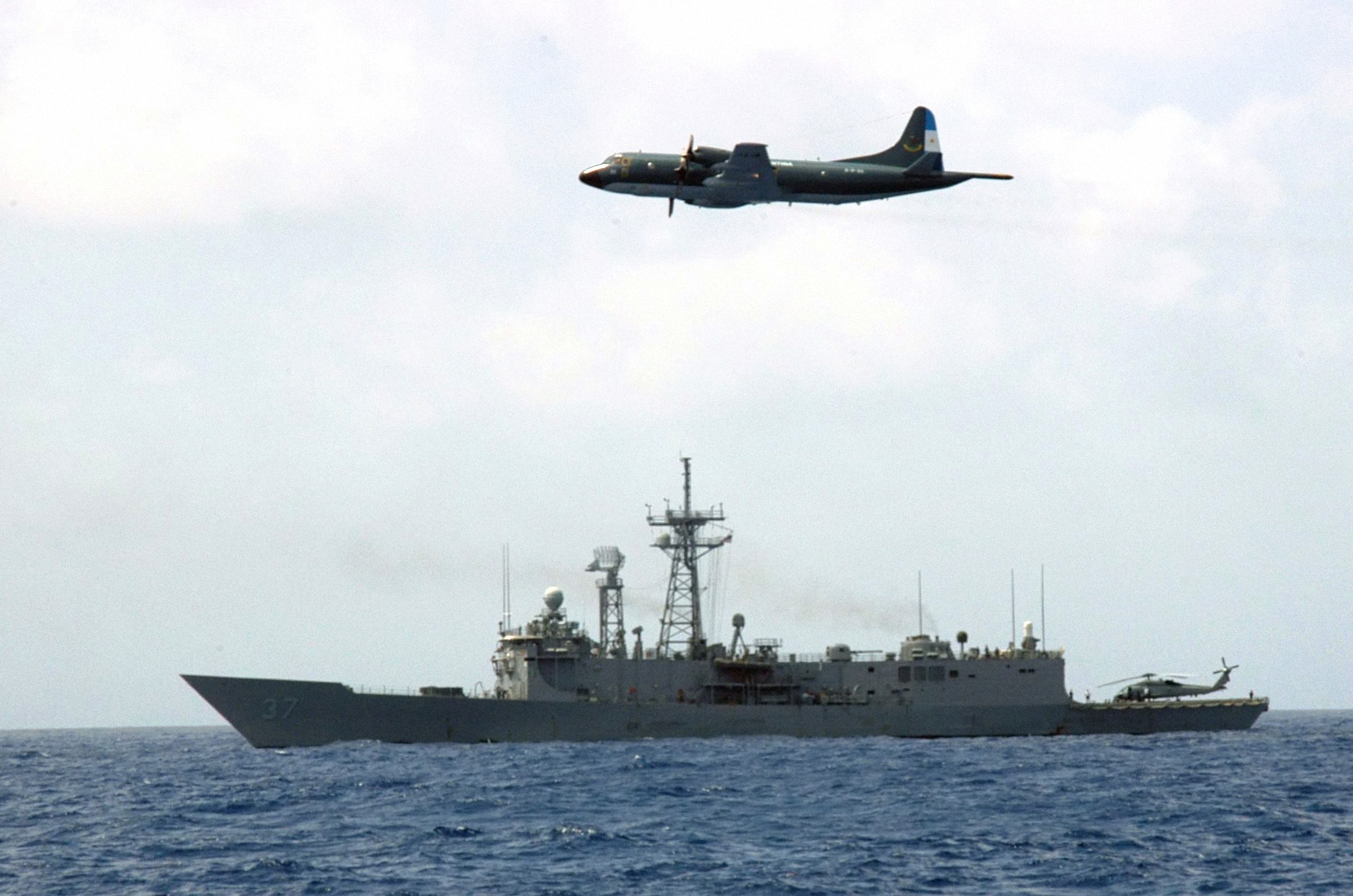
P-3 in joint operations in Panama

In 1983, democracy was restored in Argentina and despite stricter military budgets, COAN was able to modernize with the lifting of arms embargoes. P-3 Orions and modified Beechcraft Super King Air were incorporated and Eurocopter Fennecs were bought as the new surface fleet embarked helicopter. New-built Agusta SH-3 Sea Kings for Antarctica arrived and Bell UH-1H helicopters were assigned to the naval aviation to support the Argentine Marines. The navy also received Brazilian MB-326 Xavantes to replace their lost MB-339s.

The 1980s saw the last deployments of ARA Veinticinco de Mayo: the Dassault-Breguet Super Étendards and the Israeli upgraded S-2T Turbo Trackers performed qualifications on her until the ship's final retirement.

Argentina was the only South American country to send warships, including embarked Alouette IIIs and cargo planes to the 1991 Gulf War under UN mandate. In 1998, Argentina was granted Major non-NATO ally status by United States President Bill Clinton.

=== Present day ===
Since 2001, due to the lack of an aircraft carrier, pilot qualification tests took place on the Brazilian Navy carrier São Paulo and/or touch-and-go landings on US Navy carriers when they are in transit within Argentine coastal waters for Gringo-Gaucho manoeuvres.

In 2008 the United States transferred four Sea King helicopters to replace the two lost in the fire of the icebreaker ARA Almirante Irizar. As of 2012 a lack of funds for training and maintenance has left the Navy in poor condition. In particular their aircraft are dependent on a steady supply of foreign-made spares, which has been reduced by currency controls and import restrictions – for example the Fokker F-28 transports are grounded because of spares getting stuck in customs.

Argentina hoped to upgrade ten of its eleven remaining Super Étendard to the latest Super Étendard Modernisé (SEM) standard using equipment from aircraft retired by France. This came into doubt due to their retirement from French service and because relations with France cooled after the UK intervened to block the sale of Spanish Mirage F1s to the Argentine Air Force. Five refurbished Super Etendard aircraft were finally delivered to the Navy from France in 2019. However, these aircraft awaited the delivery of key spare parts. In 2021 it was reported that the return of these aircraft to an operational configuration was also encountering problems based on the fact that the ejector seats of the aircraft were the MK6, manufactured by Martin-Baker in the UK. In early 2022, it was reported that the spare parts problem remained unresolved and the aircraft remained in storage. As of the end of 2022, a potential solution to the problem of operationalizing the ejection seat system on the aircraft was being explored with the American company Task Aerospace. However, no decision had been taken as to whether the proposed solution would be pursued. In May 2023 it was initially reported that the aircraft would not be brought into service because of the inability to obtain parts for the Mk 6 ejection seat and due to France's inability to provide other spare parts for the aging aircraft. However, the Argentine Navy subsequently issued denials and stated that the process of bringing the aircraft into service had not been abandoned. While in early 2024 it was reported that the Navy was still working to restore at least two of the aircraft to flying condition, the inability to obtain spare parts meant that in mid-2025 it was reported that the project to restore the aircraft to flying condition had been abandoned.

Argentina was working on a procurement of four P-3C Orion aircraft from US Navy surplus stocks. Argentina's current fleet of P-3B's are non operational. The package deal was approved in September 2019. The US State Department has cleared the transaction of $78.03m to be carried out as part of a foreign military sale. It includes the delivery of related equipment and services. Argentina was to receive four turboprop engines for the aircraft and an additional four turboprop engines. It was also to receive communications and radar equipment, Infrared/Electro-optic equipment, and aviation life support systems. The US was to provide spares plus repairs, aircraft depot maintenance, and logistical support. Contractors for the deal include Logistic Services International, Lockheed Martin, Rockwell Collins and Eagle Systems. These newer Orions were to be up to the latest Orion standard, and provide Argentina with a much needed boost in anti-submarine and maritime surveillance missions. However, in the aftermath of the inauguration of Alberto Fernández as president in December 2019, the deal was cancelled with the Navy instead being compelled to refurbish its older P-3B fleet. In 2021, it was reported that the final Grumman Tracker aircraft flew for the last time leaving Argentine fixed-wing naval aviation without an anti-submarine capability, unless and until another option is found. However, other reports suggested that at as of 2022 and 2023 at least one S-2T was still flying in the maritime surveillance role and efforts were underway to recover the flying condition of two of these aircraft given the overall lack of maritime surveillance capabilities.

In June 2022 it was reported that Argentina was seeking to potentially revive the project to purchase the P-3C from the United States since none of the former P-3Bs were operational. However, it was also reported that even if the deal went ahead it would still take time to bring the ex-US Navy P-3Cs back into flying condition in the United States. As a result, work on the P-3B upgrade continued even though, in December 2022, it was reported that the refurbishment of the P-3B was proceeding slower than anticipated and while a revised delivery date of the first upgraded P-3B had been projected for September 2023, that schedule might now face delays. In February 2023 it was reported that Argentina was negotiating with Norway to purchase three or four of its surplus P-3Cs. In September 2023, Argentina agreed to buy 3x P-3C ASW/ASuW and 1x P-3N search and rescue aircraft from Norway, the first were to arrive at Trelew Almirante Zar Naval Air Base in October 2023. However, by years end the aircraft had not been delivered due to an Argentine failure to make the required payment. In March 2024, it was reported that the initial payments had been made. Delivery of the first aircraft took place in September 2024, with the remaining aircraft to follow in 2025. These dates were subsequently pushed back with the third of four aircraft only starting refurbishment in the United States in February 2026.

In 2022, the Navy took additional measures to try to retain a viable helicopter fleet by acquiring two additional Sea King helicopters in order to increase overall numbers of operational aircraft of this type. Early in 2023, it was reported that the Navy was also interested in the potential acquisition of additional surplus helicopters from Canada, though it remained to be seen whether such a purchase would be realized.

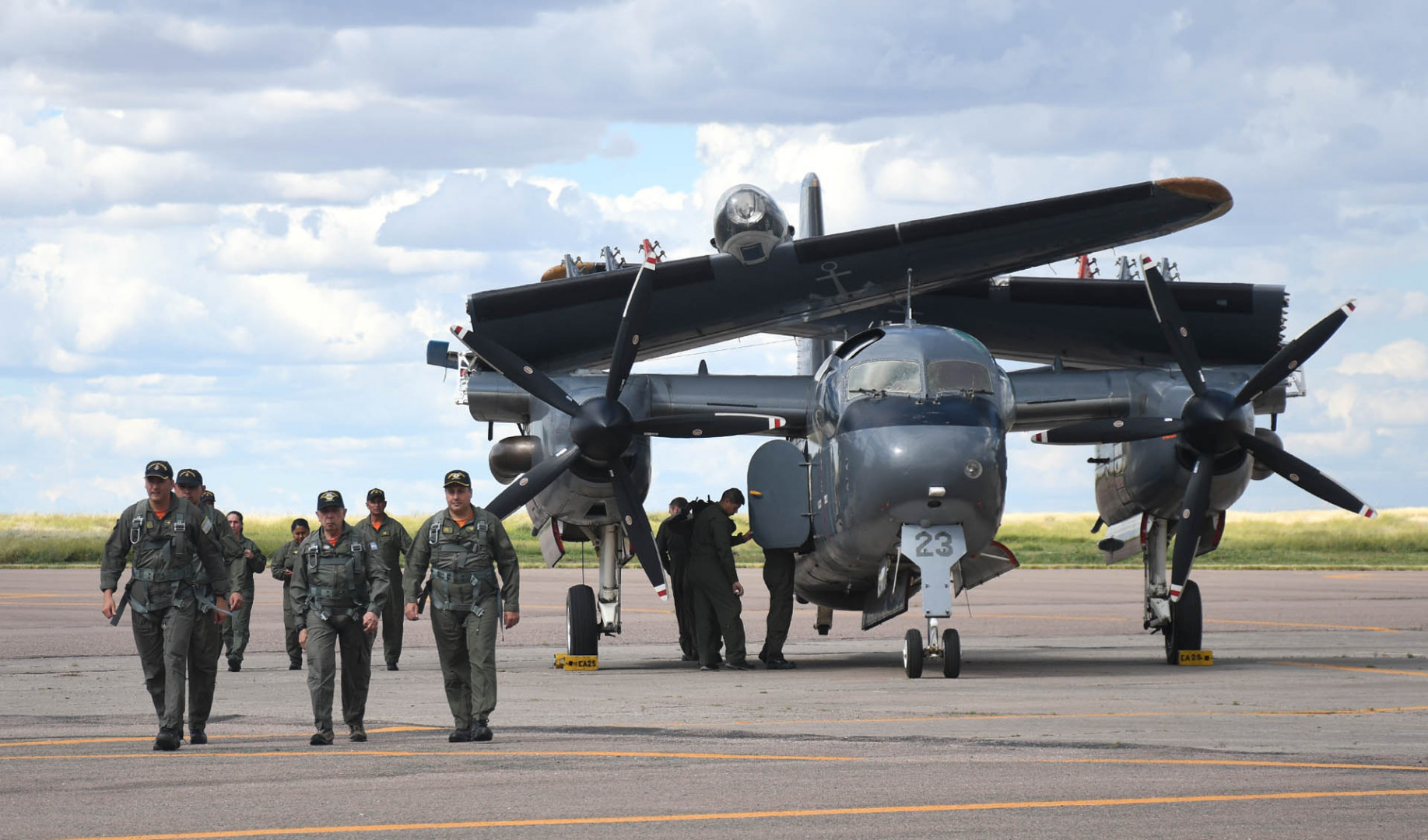
The retirement of the last Argentine S-2T

On the 2nd of December 2024, after more than 60 years of service, the Argentine Navy retired the last of its S-2T Turbo Tracker anti-submarine warfare aircraft However in July 2025, one S-2T was returned to service; it served briefly before the type was formally retired on 1 December 2025.

== Air bases ==
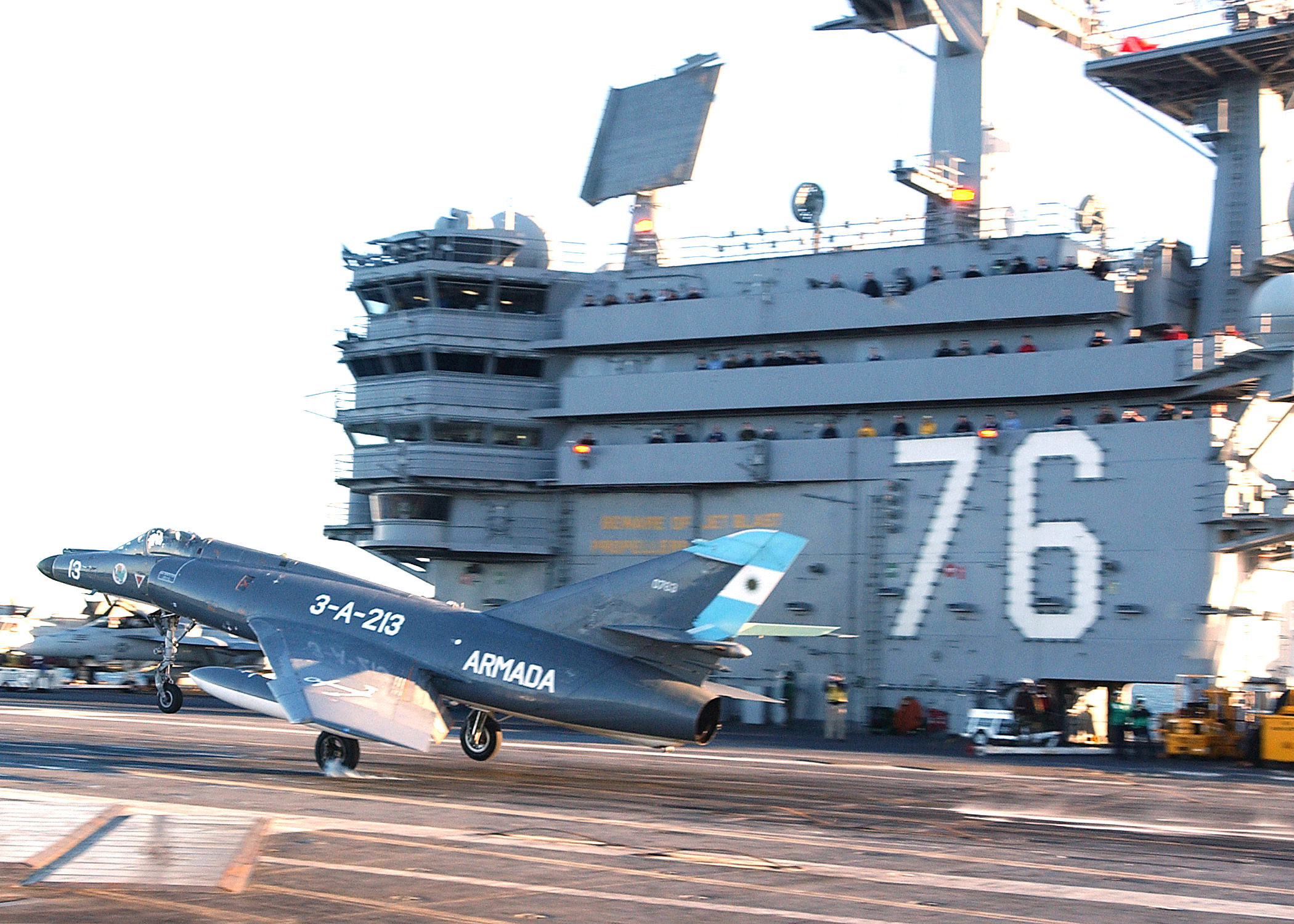
Super Etendard landing on USS Ronald Reagan during Gringo-Gaucho, June 2004

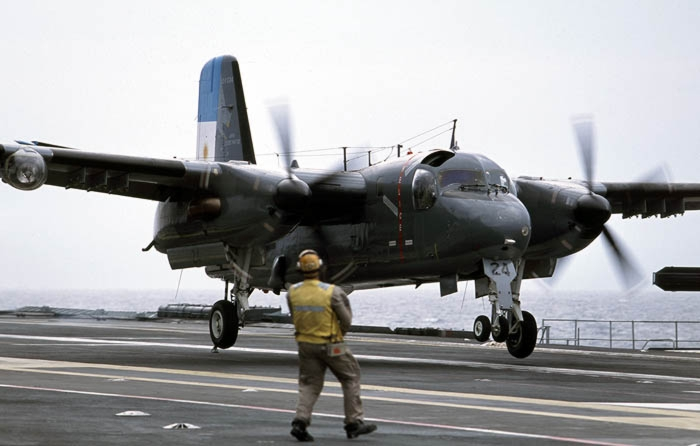
S-2T Tracker landing on Brazilian aircraft carrier São Paulo during TEMPEREX 2002

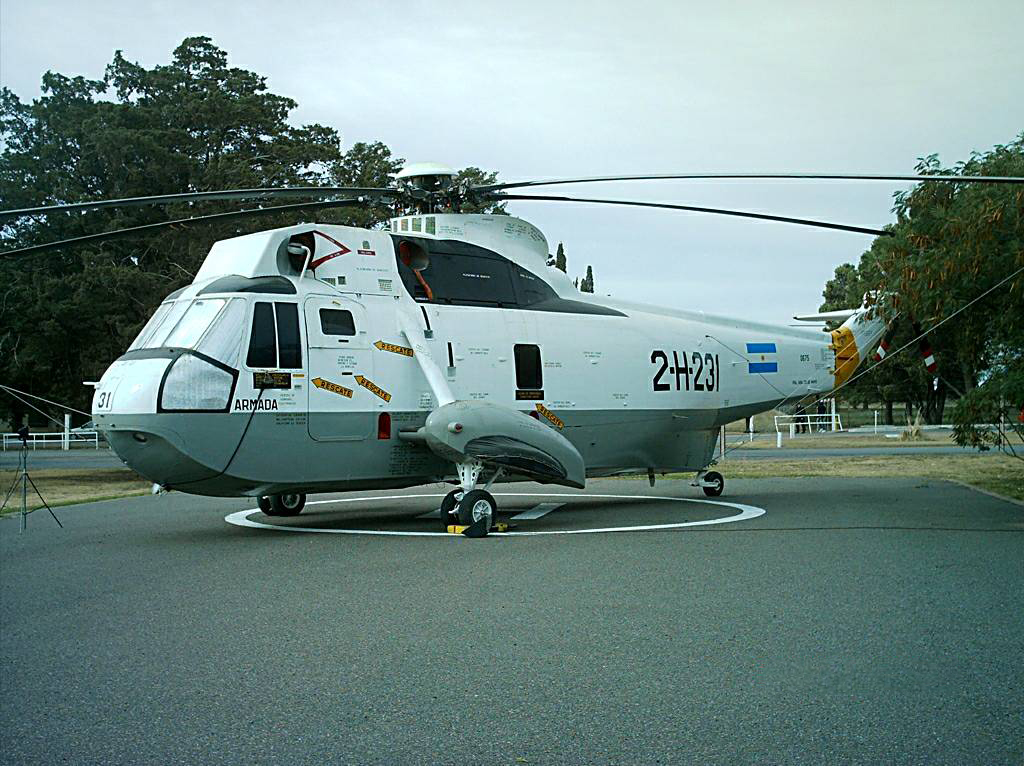
Sikorsky Sea King, preserved at MUAN

COAN has 5 main airbases ( Spanish: Base Aeronaval (BAN) ):

- Comandante Espora (BACE) at Bahía Blanca
- Almirante Zar (BAAZ) at Trelew
- Punta Indio (BAPI) near La Plata
- Almirante Quijada (BARD) at Río Grande, Tierra del Fuego.
- Naval air station Ezeiza (ETAE) at Ezeiza

== Structure ==
=== Fuerza Aeronaval 1 (Naval Aviation Force 1) ===
The Fuerza Aeronaval 1 (FAE1) is based at Punta Indio Naval Air Base, near La Plata, Buenos Aires.

- Escuela de Aviación Naval (ESAN) (Naval Aviation School) : Beechcraft T-34C-1Turbo Mentor
- 1ra Escuadrilla Aeronaval de Ataque (EA41) (1st Naval Attack Sqd) : In reserve since 2007, no aircraft assigned.
- Escuadrilla Aeronaval de Vigilancia Marítima (EA1V) (Maritime Surveillance Naval Sqd) : Beechcraft B200 Cormorán, locally converted for the maritime patrol role. Based at naval air Station Punta Indio (BAPI); being replaced by Beechcraft TC-12B Huron as of 2023

=== Fuerza Aeronaval 2 (Naval Aviation Force 2) ===
The Fuerza Aeronaval 2 (FAE2) is based at navy airbase Comandante Espora, near Bahía Blanca and consists of all embarked aircraft.

- 2da Escuadrilla Aeronaval de Caza y Ataque (EA32) (2nd naval Fighter/Attack Sqd): (Dassault-Breguet Super Étendard - not operational)
- Escuadrilla Aeronaval Antisubmarina (EA2S) (Antisubmarine naval Sqd) : Grumman/IAI S-2T Turbo Tracker and Pilatus PC-6B2/H2 Turbo Porter, in reserve since 2026.
- 1ra Escuadrilla Aeronaval de Helicópteros (EAH1) (1st naval Helicopters Sqd) : Eurocopter AS-555SN Fennec
- 2da Escuadrilla Aeronaval de Helicópteros (EAH2) (2nd naval Helicopters Sqd) : Sikorsky S-61 D4 H-3 Sea King and Agusta AS-61 Sea King
- 3ra Escuadrilla Aeronaval de Helicópteros (EAH3) (3rd naval Helicopters Sqd) : Bell UH-1 Iroquois, assigned to the marines – transferred to the army on February 7, in reserve since 2008, no aircraft assigned..

=== Fuerza Aeronaval 3 (Naval Aviation Force 3) ===
The Fuerza Aeronaval Numero 3 (FAE3) is based at Naval Airbase Almirante Zar, near Trelew to perform sea control and Search and rescue duties along the Argentine coast from the Uruguayan border to the Antarctic Peninsula.

- Escuadrilla Aeronaval de Exploración (EA6E) (Exploration naval Sqd) : P-3B reported non-operational, P-3C since 2024.

== Naval aircraft in service ==
List excludes non-operational aircraft (notably P-3B Orion and Dassault-Breguet Super Étendard) in storage or refurbishment

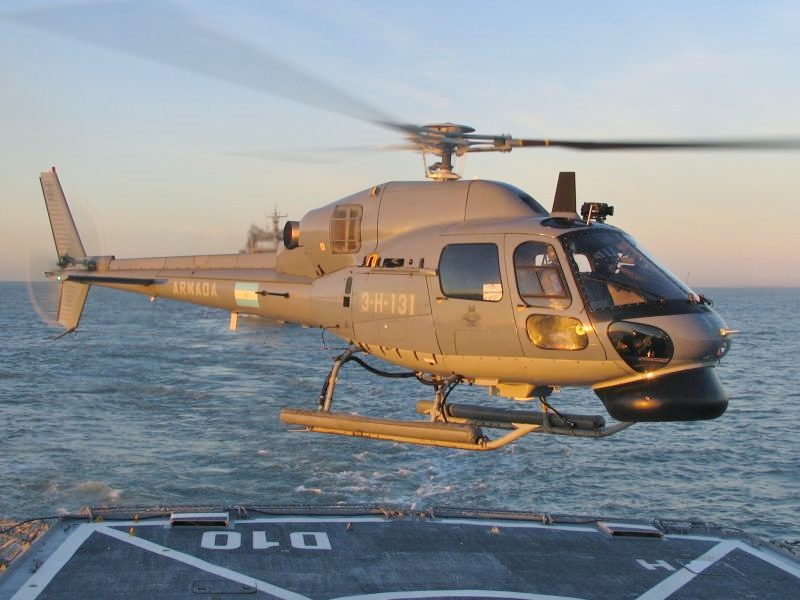
Fennec on ARA Almirante Brown.

Aircraft	Origin	Type	Variant	In service	Notes
Maritime Patrol
P-3C Orion	United States	maritime surveillance	P-3C/N Orion	2	4 (1 P-3N/3 P-3C) ordered; service entry of first aircraft in September 2024; second in 2025; the rest to follow in 2026-27
King Air	United States	maritime surveillance	BE-200 Cormorán	5	
Reconnaissance
King Air	United States	Reconnaissance	200	2	
Transport
King Air	United States	Utility	200	1	Being replaced by 2 Beechcraft TC-12B Hurons as of 2023
Beechcraft TC-12B Hurons	United States	Utility		2	
Trainer Aircraft
Beechcraft T-34	United States	Trainer		10	
Helicopters
Eurocopter AS555	France	Utility		1	
AugustaWestland AW109	Italy	Utility			4 on order
SH-3 Sea King	United States	ASW	S-61D-3	6	

In addition to the Naval aviation, a small air fleet is maintained by the Argentine Coast Guard.

For aircraft previously operated by the Argentine Navy, see List of aircraft of Argentine Naval Aviation.

== See also ==
- Argentine Air Force
- Argentine Army Aviation
- Argentine air forces in the Falklands War
  - Battle of San Carlos
- List of aircraft of the Argentine Naval Aviation
