= Universiti Tun Abdul Razak =

Private university in Kuala Lumpur, Malaysia

Universiti Tun Abdul Razak (UNIRAZAK)
- Motto: Kuala Lumpur's Premier School of Business & Government
- Type: Private Research University
- Established: 1997
- Vice-Chancellor: Professor Datin Paduka Dr Samsinar Md Sidin
- Chairman & Pro-Chancellor: Dato’ Mohamed Nizam Abdul Razak
- Location: Kuala Lumpur, Federal Territory of Kuala Lumpur, Malaysia; 3°15′21″N 101°21′07″E
- Campus: Lot 195A, Jalan Tun Razak, 50400 Kuala Lumpur
- Colors: Crimson Red
- Nickname: UNIRAZAK
- Website: www.unirazak.edu.my

Universiti Tun Abdul Razak (UNIRAZAK) is a private university in Kuala Lumpur. The university was established on December 18th, 1997 and is one of the earliest private universities in Malaysia, known as Kuala Lumpur's School of Business & Government.

UNIRAZAK offers undergraduate and postgraduate programs in various fields such as Business, Law, Education, Information Technology, and more. They also offer Executive Education and Professional Development courses.

== Establishment ==
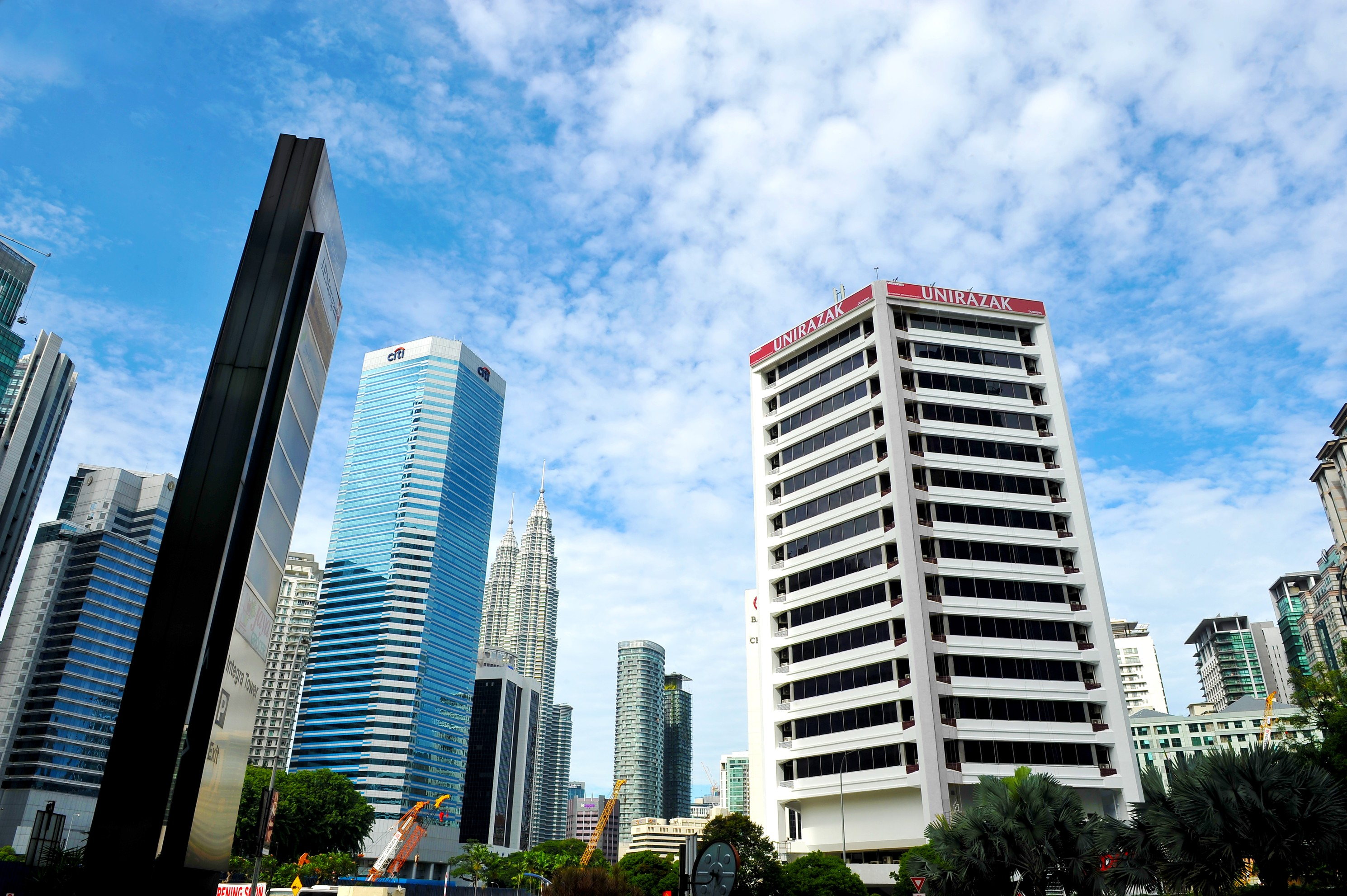
UNIRAZAK Tower Complex in Kuala Lumpur Financial Quarter at Jalan Tun Abdul Razak, Malaysia.

Founded in 1997, as one of the first Private Higher Educational Institutions in the country, the university collaborates with numerous Independent Regional Centers across the country with a population of more than 9,000 students in 60 academic programs.

== Faculties and centers ==
- Centre for Foundation Studies (CFS)
- Bank Rakyat School of Business, Innovation, Technology & Entrepreneurship (BRSBITE)
- School of Accounting & Taxation (SAT)
- Centre of Excellence for Professional Accounting & Taxation (CEPAT)
- Tun Ahmad Sarji School of Government & Public Services (TASSGPS) (formerly known as Tun Abdul Razak School of Government (TARSOG))
- School of Education & Humanities (SEH)
- Graduate School of Business (GSB)
