= List of historical equipment of the Royal Malaysian Navy =

All Royal Malaysian Navy ship carries the prefix KD (Malay : Kapal Di-Raja, literally "Royal Ship"), which is equivalent to "His Majesty's Ship" in English. The sailing ship however, carries the KLD prefix (Kapal Layar Di-Raja) to mean "His Majesty's Sailing Ship". Some of the historical ship also carries prefix HMS (His Majesty's Ship) in the early formation of the navy.

== Ships ==
Class	Image	Type	Ships	Origin	Quantity	Notes
Submarines
Agosta		Submarine	Ouessant (S623)	France	1	Transferred by French Navy to Royal Malaysian Navy for uses as training submarine from 2005 to 2009. Now turned into a museum ship in Klebang, Malacca.
Frigates
Hang Tuah		Frigate	KD Hang Tuah (F76)	UK	1	Acquired in 1977. Turned into a museum ship in Lumut, Perak.
Loch		Frigate	KD Hang Tuah (F433)	UK	1	Acquired in 1963. Scrapped.
Rahmat		Frigate	KD Rahmat (F24)	UK	1	Acquired in 1966. Scrapped.
River		Frigate	HMS Test (F56)	UK	1	Scrapped.
Corvettes
Laksamana		Corvette	KD Laksamana Tun Abdul Jamil KD Laksamana Tan Pusmah	Italy	2	Retired from service in 2025. One of the ships in class was planned for preservation as a monument in Dataran Pahlawan, Putrajaya.
Patrol vessels
Musytari		Offshore patrol vessel	KD Musytari KD Marikh	South Korea; Malaysia	2	Retired from service in 2006 and transferred to Malaysian Maritime Enforcement Agency as Langkawi-class.
Handalan		Patrol vessel	KD Pendekar	Sweden	1	KD Pendekar sunk on 25 August 2024.
Jerung		Patrol vessel	KD Pari	Germany; Malaysia	1	Retired 2026.
Kris		Patrol vessel	KD Kris KD Sundang KD Badek KD Renchong KD Tombak KD Lembing KD Serampang KD Panah KD Kerambit KD Beladau KD Kelewang KD Rentaka KD Sri Negeri Sembilan KD Sri Melaka	UK	14	Acquired in 1960. Originally 18, 14 were retired from service in 2006 and transferred to Malaysian Maritime Enforcement Agency as Sipadan-class.
Perkasa		Patrol vessel	KD Perkasa KD Handalan KD Gempita KD Pendekar	UK	4	Acquired in 1964. Scrapped.
ML 1000 Type SDML		Patrol vessel	KD Sri Kedah KD Sri Negeri Sembilan KD Sri Selangor KD Sri Perak KD Sri Pahang KD Sri Kelantan KD Sri Trengganu	UK	7	Acquired in 1949. ML 1000 Type Seaward Defence Motor Launch (SDML). Scrapped.
Kedah		Patrol vessel	KD Sri Kedah KD Sri Selangor KD Sri Perak KD Sri Pahang KD Sri Kelantan KD Sri Trengganu	UK	6	Acquired in 1961. Vosper Type Patrol Craft. Replaced the ML 1000 Type SDML. Scrapped.
Ford Type SDML		Patrol vessel	KD Panglima (68)	UK	1	Acquired in 1956. Originally named as HMS Panglima but then re-commissioned as KD Panglima in 1963. Returned to Singapore in 1967 after Singapore's secession.
Bedok		Patrol vessel	KD Bedok	UK	1	Scrapped.
HMS Panji/KD Panji		Patrol vessel	KD Panji	UK	1	Originally named as HMS Panji but then re-commissioned as KD Panji in 1963. Scrapped.
Duyong		Patrol vessel	KD Duyong (1109)	UK	1	Acquired in 1971. Dive Tender Type Vessel. Scrapped.
Mutiara		Patrol vessel	KD Mutiara (35)	UK	1	Acquired in 1961. Scrapped.
HMS Simbang		Patrol vessel	HMS Simbang	UK	1	Torpedo Recovery Vessel. Scrapped.
Mines counter-measure vessels
Ham		Minesweeper	KD Sri Johor KD Sri Perlis KD Lanka Suka KD Jerong KD Temasek KD Todak	UK	6	Scrapped.
Ton		Minesweeper	KD Mahamiru KD Ledang KD Jerai KD Kinabalu KD Tahan KD Brinchang KD Perantau	UK	7	Scrapped.
Isles		Minesweeper	HMS Sri Johore	UK	1	Acquired in 1954. Former HMS Dabchick or HMS Thorney in Royal Navy service. Originally named as HMS Penyu but then renamed as HMS Sri Johore. Scrapped.
Hatsutaka		Minelayer	HMS Laburnum/KD Singapura	Japan	1	Originally named as HMS Laburnum but then re-commissioned as KD Singapura in 1963. Scrapped.
Multi-role support ships / Amphibious warfare ships
Newport	USS Spartanburg County (LST-1192)	Landing Ship Tank	KD Sri Inderapura	USA	1	Scrapped.
LST 511/542		Landing Ship Tank	KD Sri Banggi KD Sri Langkawi KD Rajah Jarom	USA	3	Scrapped.
Mark 8 LCT		Landing Ship Tank	KD Sri Langkawi	UK	1	Acquired in 1965. Former HMS Counterguard in Royal Navy service. Scrapped.
Mark 3 LCT		Landing Ship Tank	HMS Pelandok/HMS Malaya	UK	1	Acquired in 1949. Former LCT 341 in Royal Navy service. Originally named as HMS Pelandok but then renamed as HMS Malaya. Scrapped.
LCG (L)		Landing Ship Tank	HMS Sri Perlis	UK	1	Acquired in 1949. Former LCG 450 in Royal Navy service. Renamed as HMS Sri Perlis. Scrapped.
Auxiliary ships
Bunga Mas Lima		Auxiliary ship	KA Bunga Mas Enam	Malaysia	1	Scrapped.
Hydrographic survey vessels
Mutiara		Hydro ship	KD Mutiara	Malaysia	1	Scrapped.
Training ships
Fajar Samudera		Training ships	MV Fajar Samudera	Malaysia	1	Sold to PSSB Sdn Bhd and converted to passenger vessel. Sank off Port Klang road due to leakage and lack of maintenance in 2013.
Tugboats
KTD		Tugboat	KTD Sotong KTD Kepah KTD Ketam KTD Teritip KTD Belangkas KTD Kembong KTD Selar KTD Tepuruk	Japan	8	Scrapped.

== Aircraft ==
Class	Image	Type	Ships	Origin	Quantity	Notes
Helicopters
Westland Wasp		Anti-submarine warfare	Wasp MK 1	UK	12	One is preserved in Sultan Abu Bakar Museum in Pekan, Pahang.
