= KA Tun Azizan =

Malaysian auxiliary ship

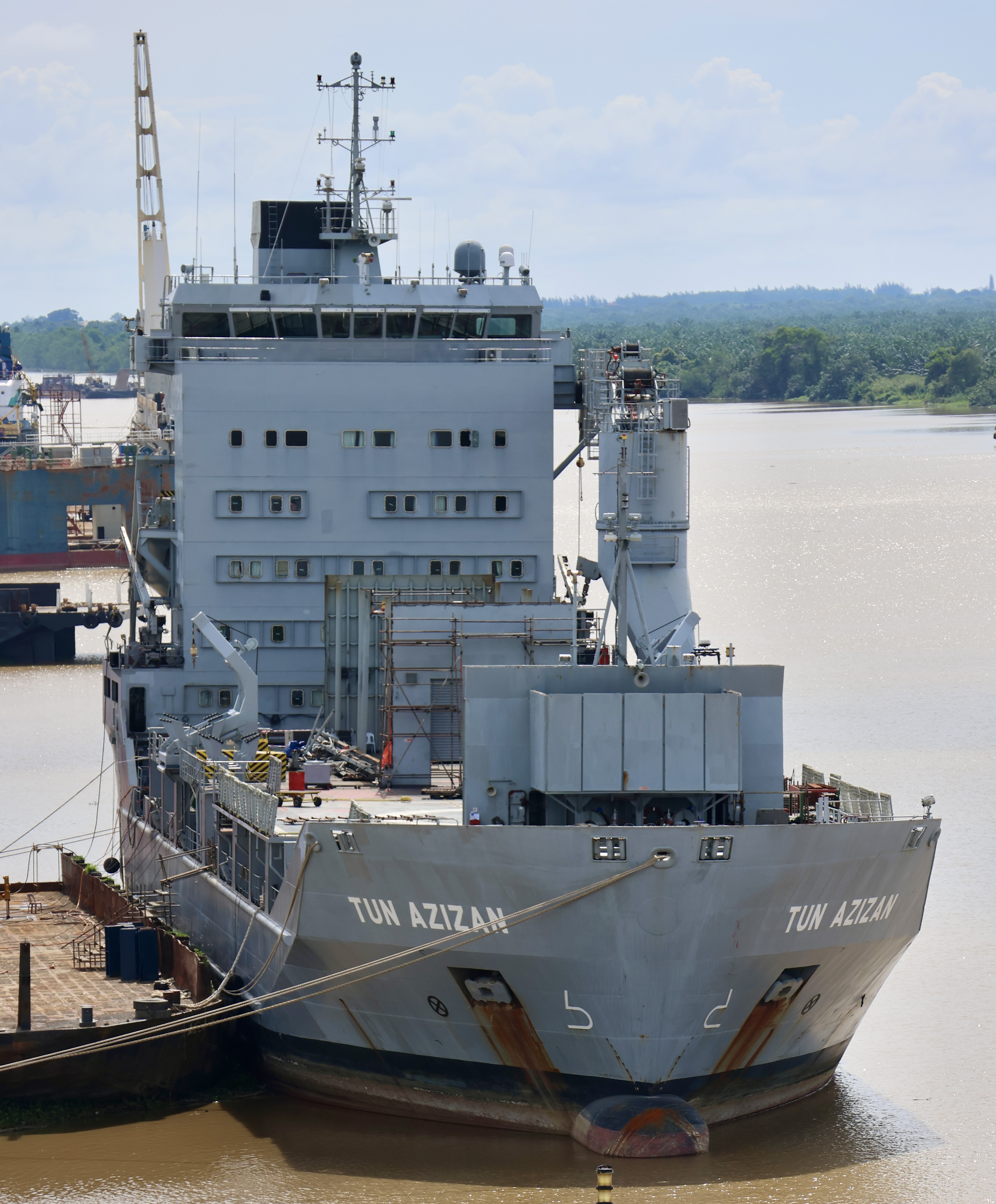
- KA Tun Azizan moored on the Baram River in 2024

History

Malaysia
- Namesake: Azizan Zainul Abidin
- Builder: Malaysian Marine and Heavy Engineering
- Launched: 1999
- Identification: IMO number: 9169873; MMSI number: 533130353; Callsign: 9MOD
- Status: In active service
- Badge

General characteristics
- Type: Auxiliary multi-purpose support ship
- Displacement: 8719 tonnes
- Length: 102 m (335 ft)
- Beam: 22.7 m (74 ft)
- Draught: 5.7 m (19 ft)
- Propulsion: Heavy Fuel Oil Tank (used for cruising) – 540 tonnes; Marine Diesel Oil Tank (used for generator) – 50 tonnes; Cylinder Oil Tank – 11,000 L; Fresh Water Tank – 980 tonnes
- Speed: 17.0 knots (31.5 km/h; 19.6 mph)
- Armament: Medium arms; FN MAG; FN Minimi; Mk 19 grenade launcher
- Aircraft carried: 1 x Fennec AS555 or Super Lynx
- Aviation facilities: Hangar; Helicopter landing platform

KA Tun Azizan is an auxiliary ship currently in service with Royal Malaysian Navy (RMN). She was sponsored by local company Petroliam Nasional Berhad (PETRONAS) and transferred from Malaysia International Shipping Corporation Berhad (MISC) to the RMN. Malaysia Marine and Heavy Engineering (MMHE) then changes and modifies a used cargo vessel to be used as a forward operation base operated by the Royal Malaysian Navy in Sulu Sea, Lahad Datu, Sabah to support the operation of the Eastern Sabah Security Command (ESSCOM). Since its operation in July 2015, KA Tun Azizan has operated under the Malaysian International Shipping Corporation (MISC) with the appointment of commanding officers absorbed as members of the RMN Volunteer Reserve Team.

== History ==
Petronas, together with MISC Bhd and Malaysia Marine Heavy Engineering (MMHE), has converted Tun Azizan, a cargo vessel, into a mobile sea base ship with the necessary features to function as a long-term national security asset following the incident of armed group invasion in Kg Tanduo, Lahad Datu, Sabah on 12 February 2013.

In November 2014, Petronas led an initiative jointly with MMHE and MISC to convert a used cargo vessel for the Royal Malaysian Navy's use as a mobile forward operating base in Sabah. These facilities are the first in Malaysia and Southeast Asia. It can accommodate a total of 99 crew members and is equipped with accommodation, food storage, washing room, operating and communication room, powerhouse, air conditioning system as well as military equipment and infrastructure. Tun Azizan is also equipped with light canon and grenade launchers such as those on the other Malaysian navy auxiliary ships, Bunga Mas Lima (BM5) and Bunga Mas Enam (BM6). All features and equipment have been fitted according to the technical requirements of the Malaysian Armed Forces (ATM).

The ship was constructed by Malaysian Marine and Heavy Engineering (MMHE) in Pasir Gudang, Johor and launched on 5 May 2015. She began operating as a Naval Base on 13 May 2015.
