= Bunga Mas Lima-class auxiliary ship =

Auxiliary ship class

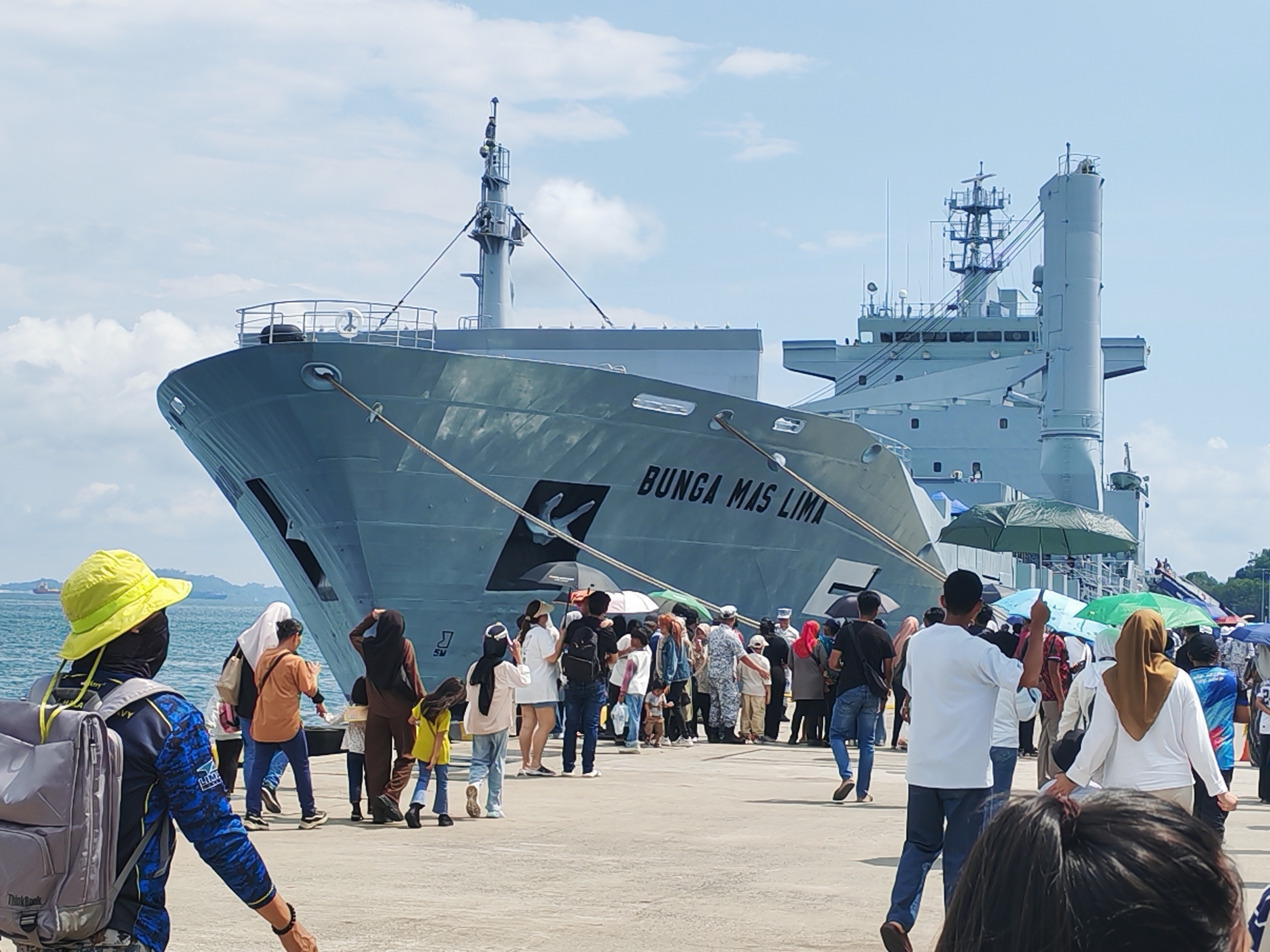
- KA Bunga Mas Lima in Royal Malaysian Navy open day

History
- Name: Bunga Mas Lima class
- Operator: Royal Malaysian Navy
- Builder: Malaysian Marine and Heavy Engineering
- Completed: 2
- Decommissioned: 1
- In service: 1

General characteristics
- Type: Auxiliary multi-purpose support ship
- Displacement: 9,000 tonnes
- Length: 132.80 m (435 ft 8 in)
- Beam: 22.7 m (74 ft 6 in)
- Draught: 7.5 m (24 ft 7 in)
- Speed: 17.0 knots (31.5 km/h; 19.6 mph)
- Capacity: Heavy Fuel Oil Tank (used for cruising) - 540 tonnes; Marine Diesel Oil Tank (used for generator) - 50 tonnes; Cylinder Oil Tank - 11,000 L; Fresh Water Tank - 980 tonnes
- Armament: Medium arms; FN MAG; FN Minimi; Mk 19 grenade launcher
- Aircraft carried: 1 x Fennec AS555 or Super Lynx
- Aviation facilities: Hangar; Helicopter landing platform

The Bunga Mas Lima class is a class of auxiliary ships in service with the Royal Malaysian Navy (RMN). The class comprises two ships: KA Bunga Mas Lima and KA Bunga Mas Enam. Each ship has a length of 132 metres (433 ft 1 in) and displaces about 9,000 tonnes (8,900 long tons).

== Development ==
KA Bunga Mas Lima and KA Bunga Mas Enam were built at Malaysian Marine and Heavy Engineering in Pasir Gudang, Johor. Both ships were purchased by RMN to escort and protect Malaysian freighter ships in international waters. They are also used to patrol and control securities in Sabah waters to enforce the ESSZONE task in Sabah.

== Service history ==
KA Bunga Mas Lima was involved in Operation Dawn 8: Gulf of Aden in 2011, where RMN commando PASKAL was tasked to rescue the hijacked ship MV Bunga Laurel.

In the same year, KA Bunga Mas Lima together with a C-130 from Royal Malaysian Air Force (RMAF) was tasked to ferry 500 Malaysian students out of Egypt during the 2011 Egyptian revolution.

== Ships of the class ==
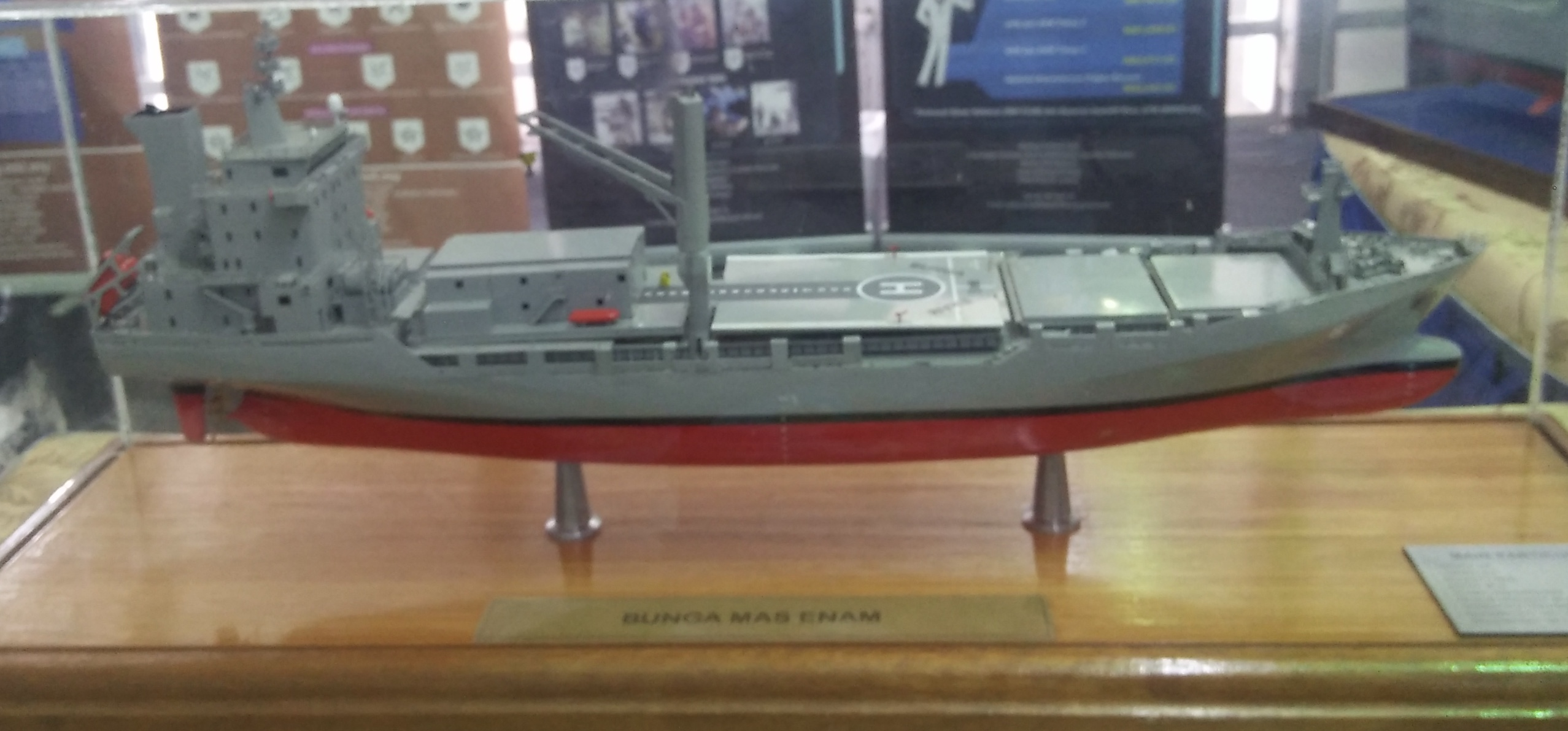
Bunga Mas Lima-class scale model in display during open day

Pennant	Name	Builders	Launched	Commissioned	Division/Squadron	Notes
BM5	KA Bunga Mas Lima	Malaysian Marine and Heavy Engineering	1996	1 June 2009		Launched as TEU container vessel by MISC in 1996 and commissioned as auxiliary vessel by RMN in 2009.
BM6	KA Bunga Mas Enam	Malaysian Marine and Heavy Engineering	1997	9 August 2011		Launched as TEU container vessel by MISC in 1997 and commissioned as auxiliary vessel by RMN in 2011. Retired in 2023.
