= Musytari-class offshore patrol vessel =

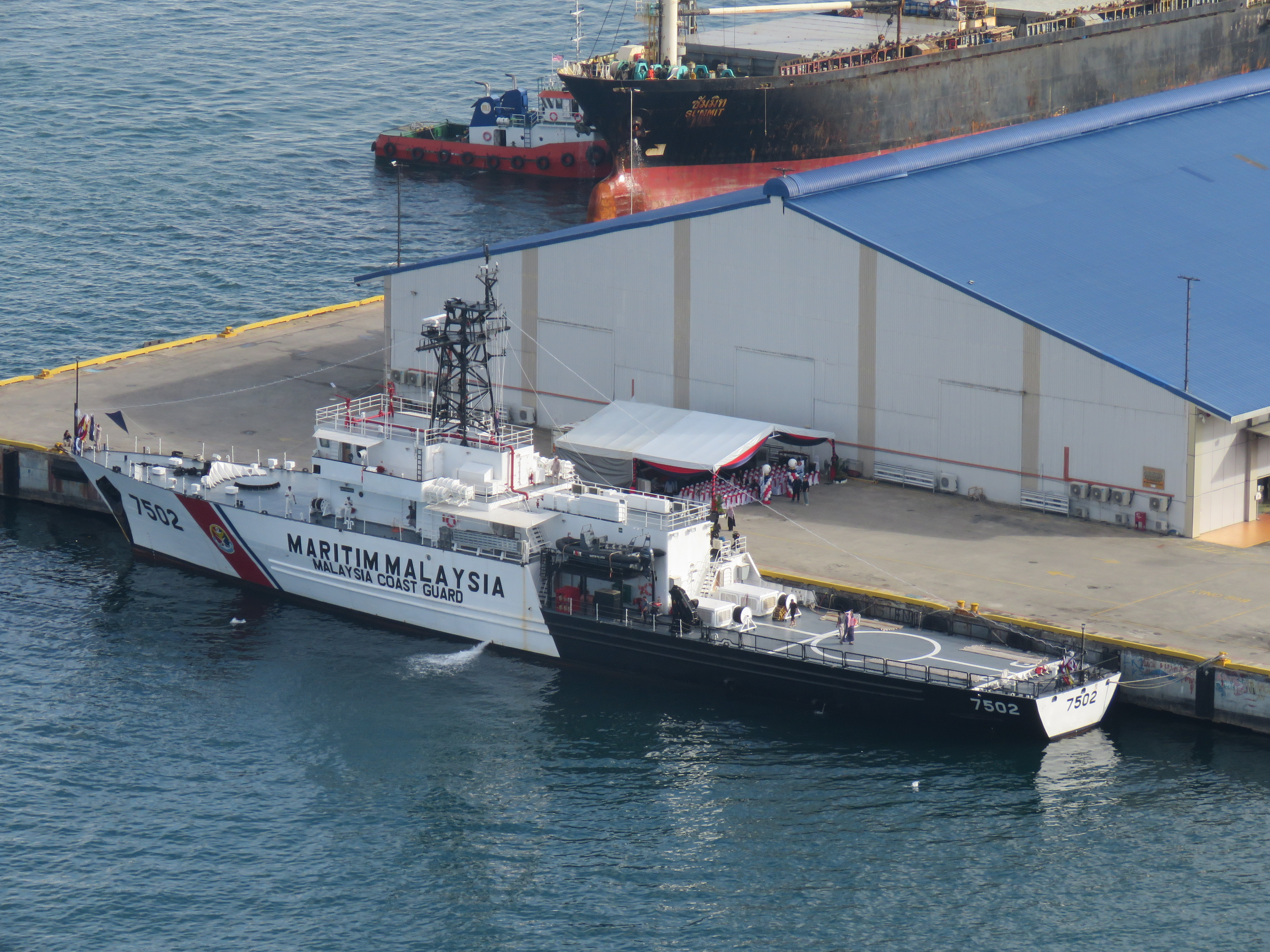
- KM Bangi on the Kota Kinabalu in 2025

Class overview
- Name: Musytari class in Royal Malaysian Navy (retired); Langkawi class in Malaysia Coast Guard (active)
- Builders: Korea Tacoma Shipbuilding; Malaysia Shipyard and Engineering
- Operators: Royal Malaysian Navy (retired); Malaysian Maritime Enforcement Agency (active)
- Planned: 2
- Completed: 2
- Active: 2

General characteristics
- Type: Offshore patrol vessel
- Displacement: 1,100 t (1,100 long tons)
- Length: 75 m (246 ft 1 in)
- Propulsion: 2 × SEMT Pielstick diesels engine
- Speed: 22.0 knots (40.7 km/h; 25.3 mph)
- Armament: 2-4 × 12.7 mm general purpose machine guns
- Aircraft carried: Helipad for 1 × AgustaWestland AW139 or Eurocopter Dauphin

The Musytari class is a class of two offshore patrol vessels of the Royal Malaysian Navy in service from 1980s to 2006. They were then handed over to the Malaysian Maritime Enforcement Agency / Malaysia Coast Guard in June 2006, renamed and known as the Langkawi class.

== History ==
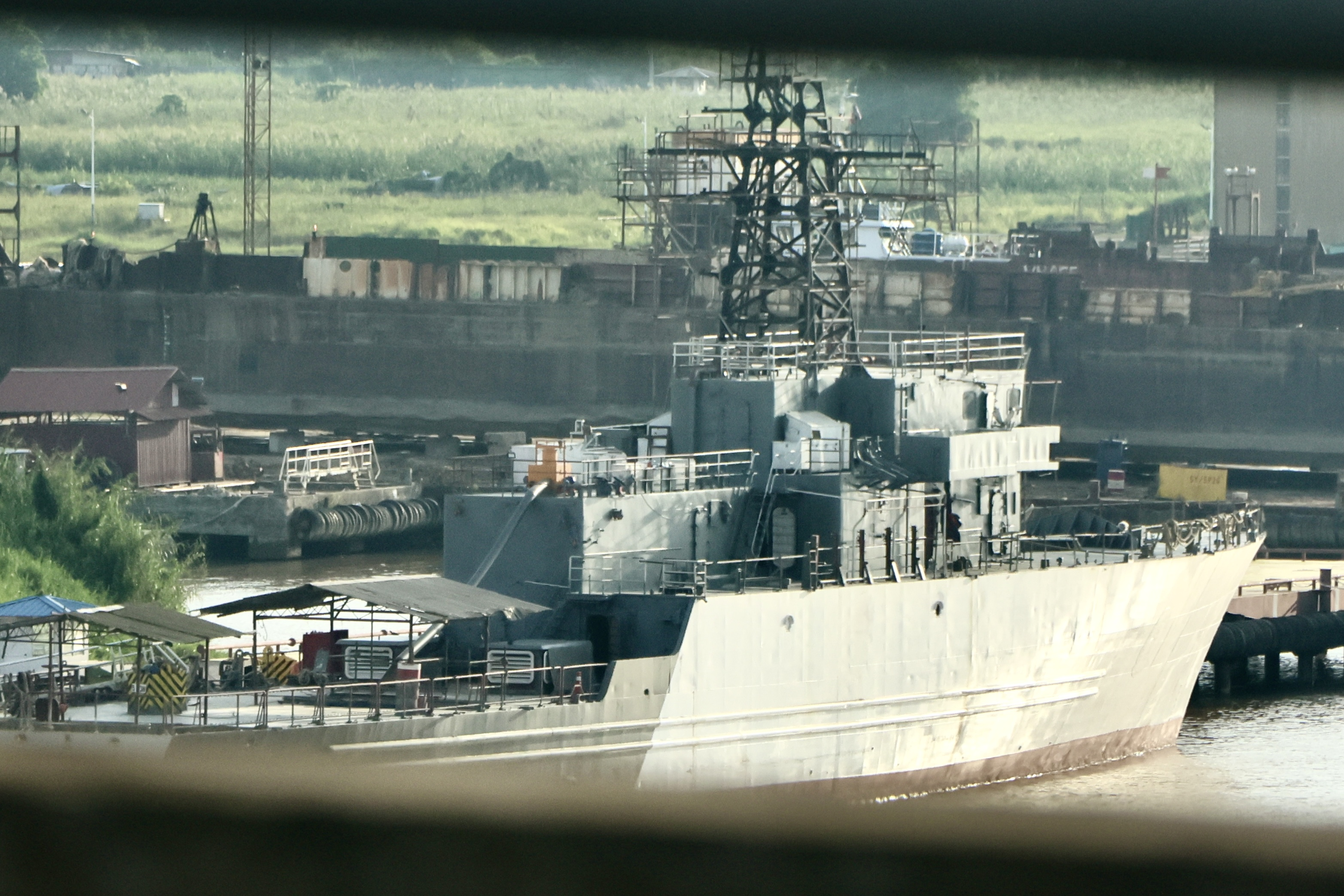
Rear view of the ship

The ships was purchased by the Royal Malaysian Navy in 1980s and served as an offshore patrol vessels until 2006 before both of the ships handed over to the Malaysia Coast Guard. The original armament includes one Bofors 57 mm gun as the primary weapon and two to four 12.7 mm machine guns. The ships are also equipped with a helicopter deck to operate one medium-sized helicopter. During refit in 2024/2025, it is confirmed that the Bofors 57 mm gun were removed and there is planned to replace it with one 30 mm gun.

== Ships of the class ==
The ships are currently active in the Malaysia Coast Guard after being decommissioned from the Royal Malaysian Navy in 2006.

Pennant number	Builder	Former name	Current name	Commission year	Status
7501	Malaysia Shipyard and Engineering	Musytari	Langkawi	2006	In service
7502	Korea Tacoma Shipbuilding	Marikh	Bangi	2006	In service
