= Honorary Citizen of Singapore =

Title of honor conferred by the Government of Singapore

The Honorary Citizen Award is the highest national honour conferred by the Government of Singapore to foreigners since 2003, to recognise and acknowledge the contributions of foreigners who have contributed extensively and significantly to Singapore and its people.

== Description ==
The Honorary Citizen Award was first introduced in 2003, it is the highest national honour for foreigners. The title Honorary Citizen is conferred for life.

Other existing national awards for foreigners includes the Public Service Star (Distinguished Friends of Singapore) award and the Public Service Medal (Friends of Singapore) award.

The award does not equate to citizenship. Therefore, atypical rights and duties of Singapore citizens, such as voting rights and the requirement to fulfil National Service (NS), do not apply to Honorary Citizens. Additionally, grants and subsidies which Singaporeans are entitled to are not made available to the recipients.

The privileges for the award recipients include the right to live and work in Singapore for themselves as well as their immediate dependent family members and to purchase property if they decide to stay in Singapore.

Administered by Ministry of Manpower, a selection committee panel made up of high-level government officials would receive nominations of foreigners who have rendered extensive and valuable services to Singapore and its people, or who have made a significant impact in the areas of business, science and technology, information communications, education, health, arts and culture, sports, tourism, community services or security. The final selections are then endorsed by the Cabinet of Singapore. Recipients are conferred the Award in the following year of their nomination. The Awards are presented at a formal ceremony by the President of Singapore at the Istana.

As of 2025, there are 22 recipients being conferred with the title.

== Honourees ==
List of recipients
Year of conferment	Recipient	Nationality	Recognition	Additional Ref.
2003	Sydney Brenner	United Kingdom	contributions in establishing Singapore as a biomedical hub	
2003	Pasquale Pistorio	Italy	contributions in establishing Singapore as a microelectronics hub	
2004	Sir Richard Sykes	United Kingdom	contributions to the development of Singapore as an international biomedical sciences hub	
2004	Lodewijk Christiaan van Wachem	Netherlands	contributions in positioning Singapore as a compelling global hub for business and investment	
2005	Tsutomu Kanai	Japan	contributions to the development of Singapore	
2005	Robert A. Brown	United States	contributions to the Singapore Government	
2006	Lee Raymond	United States	contributions to the development of Singapore economy	
2006	Heinrich von Pierer	Germany	contributions to the development of Singapore economy	
2008	Ratan Tata	India	contribution to the growth of high-tech sectors in Singapore	
2008	Tan Sri Frank Tsao	Malaysia	pivotal role in shaping the growth of the maritime industry and in promoting maritime education and research	
2010	Jeroen van der Veer	Netherlands	contributions to Singapore economy through Shell	
2011	Professor Edward Holmes	United States	leadership in building up translational and clinical research infrastructure in Singapore	
2012	Ronald Oxburgh, Baron Oxburgh	United Kingdom	contributions to Singapore's higher education, science and technology landscape as well as energy policy since 1997	
2014	Hiromasa Yonekura	Japan	contributions to the growth of the chemicals industry	
2015	Sir George Radda	United Kingdom	contributions to biomedical sciences industry	
2015	Joan Bray Rose	United States	contributions towards establishing NEWater as a supplementary water source	
2016	Tadataka Yamada	United States	contributions to biomedical sciences industry	
2017	Ulrich Werner Suter	Switzerland	contributions to developing Singapore into a vibrant and well-known research and development hub	
2018	Sir Andrew Philip Witty	United Kingdom	contributions to Singapore's economic development, and the growth of biomedical sciences industry	
2019	Sir John O'Reilly	United Kingdom	contributions to engineering research and development	
2019	Victor Dzau	United States	contributions to postgraduate medical education	
2023	William Chin	United States	contributions to science, medicine and drug discovery/development	
2025	Tarun Das	India	contributions to strengthening the economic partnership between India and Singapore	
