= Frank Tsao =

Chinese-born shipping magnate of Hong Kong, Malaysia, and Singapore

- Born: Tsao Wen-king; 1925; Shanghai, China
- Died: 12 August 2019 (aged 94); Singapore
- Education: St. John's University, Shanghai
- Occupations: Entrepreneur, philanthropist
- Parents: George Tsao Ying-yung (father); Tsao Ng Yu-shun (mother)

Chinese name
- Traditional Chinese: 曹文錦
- Simplified Chinese: 曹文锦
Transcriptions
Standard Mandarin
- Hanyu Pinyin: Cáo Wénjǐn
- Wade–Giles: Ts'ao Wen-chin
Yue: Cantonese
- Jyutping: Cou^{4} Man^{4} Gam^{2}

Tan Sri Frank Tsao Wen-king (Chinese: 曹文錦; 1925 – 12 August 2019) was a Chinese-born entrepreneur who established shipping and textiles businesses in Hong Kong, Malaysia, Singapore and Thailand.

Tsao took over his family shipping business in Shanghai and moved it to Hong Kong when the Communists took over China. He founded International Maritime Carriers (IMC Group) in Hong Kong, before moving it to Singapore in the early 1990s.

Tsao helped build Singapore into an international shipping hub, and co-founded MISC and Unithai, the national shipping companies of Malaysia and Thailand, respectively, as well as Suntec City in Singapore. For his contributions, he was awarded the nobility title Tan Sri by the King of Malaysia, the Silver Bauhinia Star of Hong Kong, and the Honorary Citizen Award, Singapore's highest honour for non-citizens.

== Early life in Shanghai ==
Tsao Wen-king was born in 1925 in Shanghai, into a moderately wealthy business family. His grandfather started a shipping company on the Huangpu River. His father, George Tsao Ying-yung (曹隱云), continued to run the shipping and import-export business. The family also branched into banking. His mother, Tsao Ng Yu-shun, was an heiress who inherited a major stake of the China National Development Bank. Tsao studied economics at the prestigious St. John's University, Shanghai, and took over the family business when his father "lost interest" in it.

== Hong Kong ==
During the Chinese Civil War, Tsao moved to British Hong Kong in 1947. With the Communist takeover of China in 1949, his family fled to Hong Kong in a hurry, and 30 members of the extended family squeezed into a single house. His parents and two sisters later moved to Brazil. Tsao later recalled the period as "a matter of survival", when he worked desperately to salvage the family business.

In 1949, Tsao co-founded the Great Southern Steamship Company by purchasing an old ship from Singapore. After the Korean War broke out in 1950, the US-led Western world blockaded the newly established People's Republic of China. Tsao's business took off by trading with the PRC, shipping beans, chemicals, and steel between China, Hong Kong, and Japan. In 1966, he founded International Maritime Carriers (萬邦航運公司), which later became IMC Group.

== Southeast Asia ==
In 1958, Tsao founded Textile Corporation of Malaya, the first textile company in Malaysia, together with other Shanghainese industrialists in Hong Kong. Their main purpose was to circumvent import quotas imposed on Hong Kong's textile industry by Western countries. He later expanded his venture by establishing Malayan Weaving Mills and Malacca Textiles, and developed a close friendship with Mahathir Mohamad, the longest-serving prime minister of Malaysia.

In 1968, Malaysian businessman Robert Kuok sought Tsao's help with setting up Malaysia's first national shipping company, Malaysia International Shipping Corporation (MISC), and Tsao became the company's co-founder. He initially owned 15% of MISC's shares, second to the Kuok Brothers' 20%, and served as its Vice Chairman. Tsao also helped establish Unithai, the national shipping line of Thailand, and, more significantly, bailed the company out during a period of financial difficulty in 1986–1987 by investing in the company through IMC. By the early 1990s, he owned an estimated 70% of Unithai's shares.

Tsao helped build Singapore into an international shipping hub and moved the headquarters of IMC Group to Singapore in the early 1990s. In 1985, on the invitation of the Singaporean government, Tsao and a group of Hong Kong tycoons, including Li Ka-shing, established Suntec City Development, which developed Suntec City in the 1990s.

In the mid-1990s, he passed active management of IMC Group, by then a multi-business conglomerate, to his third child, Frederick. As of 2019, IMC Group operates 21 tankers and five bulk carriers.

== Philanthropy ==
Tsao regularly donated to the Tsao Foundation of Singapore, which he established with his mother in 1993 to help the elderly. He cofounded the Centre for Maritime Studies at the National University of Singapore, and supported maritime education at many Chinese universities, including Dalian Maritime University, Dalian University of Technology, Shanghai Jiao Tong University, Shanghai Maritime University, Tongji University, Tsinghua University, as well as Hong Kong Polytechnic University.

== Honours ==
For his contributions to the country's shipping industry, the King of Malaysia conferred Tsao the noble title Tan Sri, equivalent to a knighthood. In the 1990s, he was awarded Malaysian citizenship by Prime Minister Mahathir Mohamad.

In 2006, he was awarded the Silver Bauhinia Star by the Hong Kong government and honorary citizenship by the city of Dalian. In 2008, he was granted the Honorary Citizen Award, Singapore's highest honour for non-citizens.

== Personal life ==
Tsao was married to Maisie Chow Tsao for seven decades until her death in 2014. They had two sons and two daughters: Calvin (of Tsao & McKown Architects), Mary Ann, Frederick and Cheryd.

On 12 August 2019, Tsao died in Singapore at the age of 94 from kidney failure.
