= Hiromasa Yonekura =

Japanese businessman (1937–2018)

Hiromasa Yonekura 米倉 弘昌
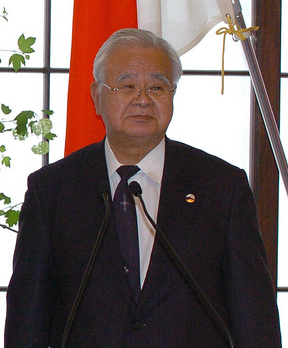
- At the Iikura Guest House on April 17, 2011
- Born: March 31, 1937; Kobe, Japan
- Died: November 16, 2018 (aged 81)
- Education: University of Tokyo; Duke University
- Title: Chairman

Hiromasa Yonekura (米倉 弘昌, Yonekura Hiromasa; March 31, 1937 – November 16, 2018) was a Japanese businessman. He was chairman of Sumitomo Chemical and was also the chairman of the Japan Business Federation (Nippon Keidanren).

== Education ==
Yonekura received a bachelor's degree in law from University of Tokyo in 1960. He received his master's degree in 1964 from Duke University, where he subsequently he earned his PhD.

== Career ==
Yonekura joined Sumitomo Chemical in 1960 and worked his way up through the ranks to become president in 2000. He remained in this position until 2009, when he became chairman of the board.

He became chairman of the Japan Business Federation on May 27, 2010. In 2010 he received the Petrochemical Heritage Award in recognition of his contribution to the petrochemical industry.

== Awards ==
- 2014 - Honorary Citizen of Singapore
