= Malaysian Maritime Enforcement Agency Act 2004 =

Parliament of Malaysia
- Long title: An Act to establish the Malaysian Maritime Enforcement Agency to perform enforcement functions for ensuring the safety and security of the Malaysian Maritime Zone with an aim to protect maritime and other national interests in such zone and for matters necessary thereto or connected therewith.
- Citation: Act 633
- Territorial extent: Malaysia
- Passed by: Dewan Rakyat
- Passed: 14 June 2004
- Passed by: Dewan Negara
- Passed: 16 June 2004
- Royal assent: 25 June 2004
- Commenced: 1 July 2004
- Effective: 15 February 2005, P.U. (B) 67/2005

Legislative history

Initiating chamber: Dewan Rakyat
- Bill title: Malaysian Maritime Enforcement Agency Bill 2004
- Bill citation: D.R. 10/2004
- Introduced by: Mohamed Nazri Abdul Aziz, Minister in the Prime Minister's Department
- First reading: 7 June 2004
- Second reading: 14 June 2004
- Third reading: 14 June 2004

Revising chamber: Dewan Negara
- Bill title: Malaysian Maritime Enforcement Agency Bill 2004
- Bill citation: D.R. 10/2004
- Member(s) in charge: Mohamed Nazri Abdul Aziz, Minister in the Prime Minister's Department
- First reading: 15 June 2004
- Second reading: 16 June 2004
- Third reading: 16 June 2004

Keywords
- Malaysian Maritime Enforcement Agency, maritime zone, exclusive economic zone
- Status: In force

The Malaysian Maritime Enforcement Agency Act 2004 (Malay: Akta Agensi Penguatkuasaan Maritim Malaysia 2004) is an act to establish the Malaysian Maritime Enforcement Agency to perform enforcement functions for ensuring the safety and security of the Malaysia Maritime Zone with a view to the protection of maritime and other national interests in that zone. It came into force on 15 February 2005.

== Structure ==
The Malaysian Maritime Enforcement Agency Act 2004, in its current form (1 January 2006), consists of 4 Parts containing 19 sections and no schedule (including no amendment).

- Part I: Preliminary
- Part II: Establishment of Agency and Appointments
- Part III: Functions and Powers of the Agency
- Part IV: General
