= AET (company) =

Singaporean shipping company

- Company type: Private limited company
- Industry: Shipping
- Founded: 1994
- Headquarters: Singapore, Singapore
- Area served: Global
- Key people: Datuk Abu Huraira Abu Yazid (Chairman); Nick Potter (President & CEO)
- Products: Ocean transportation of crude oil and refined products
- Revenue: $1,038 million (2022)
- Number of employees: 2,400+ seafarers, 175+ shore staff
- Parent: MISC Berhad
- Website: www.aet-tankers.com

AET is a Malaysian-owned Singapore-headquartered owner and global operator of crude and clean petroleum tankers alongside specialist activities including dynamic positioning shuttle tankers (DPSTs), hydro-carbon capture and ship-to-ship lightering to oil and gas companies, refineries and petroleum traders. Its fleet of over 60 vessels includes 11 LNG dual-fuel vessels comprising five dual-fuel VLCCs, four dual-fuel Aframaxes and two dual-fuel Dynamic Positioning Shuttle Tankers, making it one of the leading providers of maritime transport to the international petroleum industry.

== History ==
Originally a subsidiary of Neptune Orient Lines, AET, formerly American Eagle Tankers, was formed in Houston in 1994 to serve the US Gulf lightering market. From a fleet of just three tankers, the company grew to become a major force in that rapidly developing market.

In April 2003, it was announced that AET would become a wholly owned subsidiary of international logistics provider MISC Berhad (formerly the Malaysian International Shipping Corporation). The sale was finalised in July 2003. At that time, AET was operating around 25 vessels and this provided MISC with the critical mass and strategic positioning to serve its global petroleum customers with coverage in the Atlantic Basin, the Persian Gulf and the East Coast.

In 2007, the company's operations around the world were brought together under the single, global brand of AET.

== AET today ==
AET has its headquarters in Singapore with commercial operations being conducted from regional offices in Houston, London, Kuala Lumpur, Galveston, Rio de Janeiro, Montevideo and Stavanger.

On behalf of oil majors and large trading houses, AET transports crude oil across the world's oceans in its fleet of Dynamic Positioning Shuttle Tankers (DPST), Very Large Crude Carriers (VLCC), Aframax and Suezmax tankers. It also moves refined products in a fleet of smaller clean tankers. In addition, the company leads the industry in the provision of US Gulf lightering services with over 14,000 ship-to-ship (STS) transfers in total – a specialised operation involving the safe transfer of crude oil at sea from large tankers to smaller ships that are more suited to enter the ports along the US coast. As part of its commitment to this sector, AET has in its fleet lightering support vessels (LSVs) - the first purpose built vessels of this kind to be constructed anywhere in the world - to replace its old workboat fleet.

The company's current fleet (as at 31 March 2021) totals 11 DPSTs, 9 VLCCs, 28 Aframax, one Panamax, 6 Suezmax and 19 clean tankers. Expansion plans include a further 11 vessels that are currently being built. The latest fleet list can be found on their website.
