= Tachi Yamada =

American physician (1945–2021)

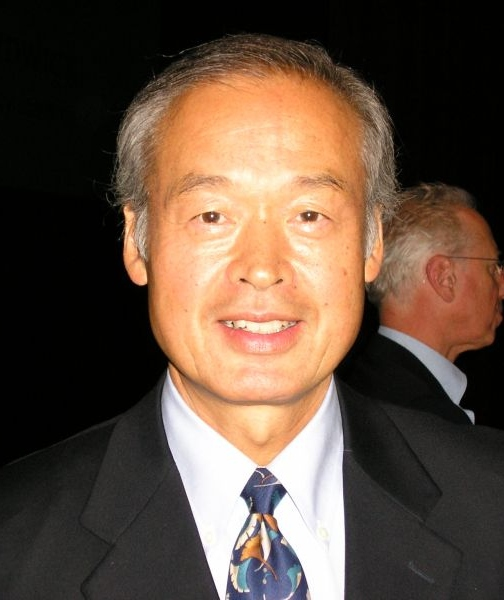
- Yamada in 2010
- Born: 5 June 1945; Tokyo, Japan
- Died: 4 August 2021 (aged 76); Seattle, Washington, U.S.
- Education: Phillips Academy
- Alma mater: Stanford University; New York University
- Occupations: Physician; gastroenterologist; pharmaceutical executive

Tadataka "Tachi" Yamada KBE (山田忠孝 Yamada Tadataka or "ターチ Tachi"; 5 June 1945 – 4 August 2021) was a Japanese-born American physician and gastroenterologist. He was a venture partner of Frazier Healthcare Partners.

== Early life and education ==
Born in Tokyo, Yamada had a Japanese American mother and was the grandson of one of the first people of Japanese descent to be fully trained as an American physician. In 1960, he moved to the United States, where he completed his education. After attending Phillips Academy for his high school education, he graduated from Stanford University with a B.A. in history and obtained his M.D. from New York University School of Medicine.

He completed his internal medicine training at the Medical College of Virginia, and then became an investigator in the United States Army Medical Research Institute of Infectious Diseases holding the rank of major, U.S. Army Medical Corps. Subsequently, he trained in gastroenterology at the UCLA School of Medicine and assumed his first faculty position there. He later moved to the University of Michigan, where he headed the Gastroenterology Division and ultimately became chairman of the Department of Internal Medicine and Physician-in-Chief of the University of Michigan Medical Center before joining GlaxoSmithKline.

A scientist and scholar in gastroenterology, Yamada authored more than 150 original manuscripts on the subject and was the editor of The Textbook of Gastroenterology for its first five editions. The studies undertaken by Yamada and his collaborators led to basic discoveries in the post-translational processing and biological activation of peptide hormones, the structure and function of receptors for hormones regulating gastric acid secretion, and the regulation of genes involved in the acid secretory process.

He was awarded honorary doctorates by the University of Michigan, University of East Anglia, the University of Warwick, Washington College, and Loyola University of Chicago.

== Career ==
Prior to Frazier Healthcare Partners, Yamada was executive vice president and a board member of Takeda Pharmaceuticals, and served as the chief medical and scientific officer of the company.

Before joining Takeda, Yamada was the president of the global health program at the Bill & Melinda Gates Foundation. In this capacity he oversaw grants totaling over $9 billion in programs directed at applying technologies to address major health challenges of the developing world including TB, HIV, malaria and other infectious diseases, malnutrition and maternal and child health. Yamada served as Chairman of Research and Development and was a member of the board of directors at GlaxoSmithKline before joining the foundation. In 2007, Yamada was asked by the U.S. Senate Committee on Finance to provide information concerning his response to critics of GSK's anditabetes drug, Avandia.

In recognition of his contributions to medicine and science, he was elected to membership in the National Academy of Medicine (US) and the National Academy of Medicine (Mexico) and to Fellowship in the Academy of Medical Sciences (UK) and the American Academy of Arts and Sciences.

Among his many other activities, he was a member of the board of directors of public corporations across four continents and was a member of the board of Agilent Technologies and chaired the boards of Phathom Pharmaceuticals and Passage Bio, two companies for which he was a founder. He also served as a member of the President's Council of Advisors on Science and Technology, vice-chair of the Council of the National Academy of Medicine (US), president of the Association of American Physicians and president of the American Gastroenterological Association. He served as a member of the board of the University of Michigan Health System and as chairman of the board of the Clinton Health Access Initiative.

== Honors ==
Yamada received an honorary appointment as Knight Commander of the Most Excellent Order of the British Empire.

He was a fellow of the Imperial College London, a Master of the American College of Physicians and a Fellow of the Royal College of Physicians; and gave the last centenary lecture at Imperial College London in March 2008, which was chaired by Sir Richard Sykes.

He was also the recipient of numerous awards, including the Smith Kline & French Award in Gastrointestinal Physiology from the American Physiological Society, the Julius Friedenwald Medal from the American Gastroenterological Association, the Distinguished Faculty Achievement Award from the University of Michigan, the Distinguished Medical Scientist Award from the Medical College of Virginia and the August M. Watanabe Prize in Translational Research from the Indiana University School of Medicine.

Yamada was conferred the title Honorary Citizen of Singapore in 2016; and the Order of the Rising Sun, Gold and Silver Stars, from the Japanese Government.
