= KA Bunga Mas Lima =

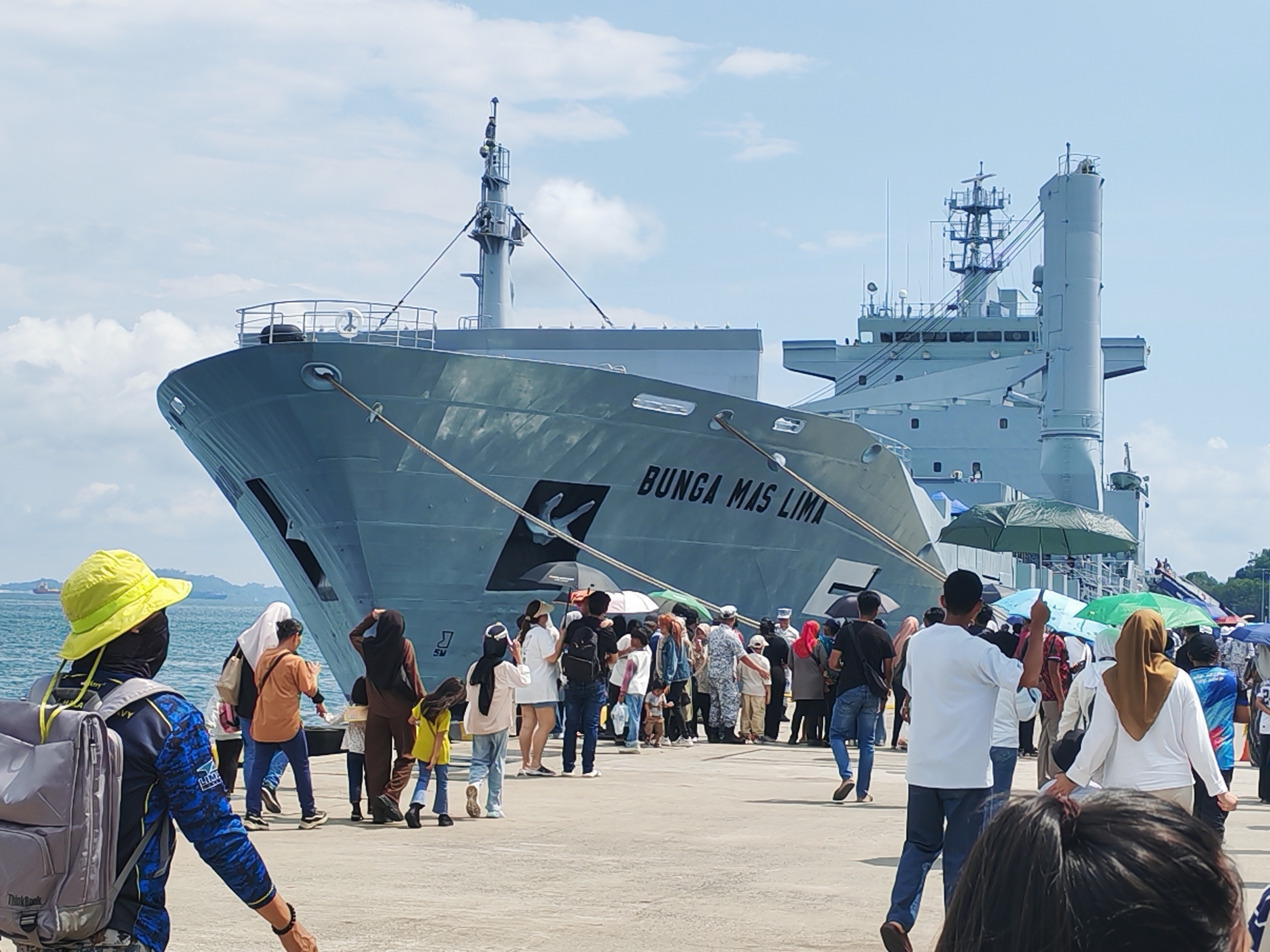
- KA Bunga Mas Lima docked at Sepanggar in May 2026 during Hari Terbuka Armada

History

Malaysia
- Name: KA Bunga Mas Lima (BM5)
- Builder: Malaysian Marine and Heavy Engineering
- Launched: 7 March 1996
- Acquired: 1 June 2009
- Commissioned: 1 June 2009
- Identification: IMO number: 9121675; MMSI number: 533167000; Callsign: 9MOC
- Status: In active service
- Badge

General characteristics
- Type: Auxiliary multi-purpose support ship
- Displacement: 9,000 tonnes
- Length: 132.80 m (435.7 ft)
- Beam: 22.7 m (74 ft)
- Draught: 7.5 m (25 ft)
- Propulsion: Heavy Fuel Oil Tank (used for cruising) - 540 tonnes; Marine Diesel Oil Tank (used for generator) - 50 tonnes; Cylinder Oil Tank - 11,000 L; Fresh Water Tank - 980 tonnes
- Speed: 17.0 knots (31.5 km/h; 19.6 mph)
- Armament: Medium arms; FN MAG; FN Minimi; Mk 19 grenade launcher
- Aircraft carried: 1 x Fennec AS555 or Super Lynx
- Aviation facilities: Hangar; Helicopter landing platform

KA Bunga Mas Lima (BM5) is a container freighter purchased by the Royal Malaysian Navy (RMN) and converted into an auxiliary ship. Bunga Mas Lima was the second ship owned by the Malaysian International Shipping Corporation (MISC) to be deployed to the Gulf of Aden.

== Development ==
The KA Bunga Mas Lima (BM5) was built at Malaysian Marine and Heavy Engineering in Pasir Gudang, Johore together with her sister, KA Bunga Mas Enam (BM6). She was launched on 7 March 1996, and was subsequently purchased by the Malaysian Government. The conversion included modifications to accommodate extra crew, fittings for launching rigid hull inflatable boats, a helicopter deck to accommodate landing and a hangar. The forward crane of Bunga Mas Lima was taken out since its presence inhibited helicopter landing while the 2nd crane were rested to the starboard side of the ship above the hangar.

This is an innovative initiative by the Navy in collaboration with MISC to sustain “Fit-For-Purpose Capability for the RMN Operation Fajar in the Gulf of Aden. Labeled as auxiliary vessel and manned by MISC crews, conscripted into the navy reserve, with the PASKAL (Navy SEAL) special operations team on board. The ship is a signal that new warships are badly needed by the navy to fill in the gap on the absence of multipurpose support ships as all of them had been sent to Gulf of Aden during the piracy breakout. The ships, KD Sri Inderasakti, KD Mahawangsa and KD Sri Inderapura are either undergoing refurbishment or engaged in other duties within Malaysian waters.

However, the RMN warships during the period especially the multipurpose command and support ship and the LST, were not fitted with a helicopter hangar but only a landing pad, which is why the RMN had to be creative and innovative. The Fleet Operations Commander, Vice Admiral Kamarulzaman proposed the idea of the Naval Auxiliary to the CEO of MISC, Datuk Shamsul Azhar to convert one of its container vessel Bunga Mas Lima with a modified helicopter hangar. Without a hangar, it is almost impossible for a taskgroup to rely on to helicopter operations, as they cannot maintain and service the helicopter especially in rough sea conditions. The engineers designed the covered hangar by stacking several 40 footer containers complete with an electrical operated hangar door.

On the contrary, the frigates and the New Generation Patrol Vessels (NGPV) had themselves equipped for helicopter operation, with an enclosed hangar and a landing pad capable of receiving an Agusta Westland Super Lynx or a Eurocopter AS-555 Fennec helicopter. However, these modern warships are very costly to be tasked for the operations over a long period.

The Naval Auxiliary Bunga Mas Lima after her mission in the Gulf of Aden were later tasked as Seabase to support naval operations especially in the East Malaysia. She has contributed huge savings for the RMN and the Malaysian Government over its service life.

== Major operation ==
- In January 2011, the Royal Malaysian Navy foiled a hijacking attempt on the Malaysian-flagged MT Bunga Laurel chemical tanker carrying lubricating oil and ethylene dichloride. The KA Bunga Mas Lima responded after receiving a distress signal from the Bunga Laurel. A Fennec attack helicopter was used to pin down the pirate mothership as PASKAL commandos boarded the tanker. The commandos injured three pirates in the battle to retake the ship. 23 crew members were rescued and seven Somali pirates were detained.
- On 5 February 2011, the Bunga Mas Lima was on duty in the Gulf of Aden and sailed to the Port of Adabiya, about two and a half hours' journey south of Cairo, to ferry 500 Malaysian students out of Egypt during the 2011 Egyptian revolution. Besides the Bunga Mas Lima, the Royal Malaysian Air Force deployed a C-130 Hercules. Malaysia Airlines (MAS) and AirAsia also made special rescue flights out of Cairo to bring Malaysian students home.
