= KA Bunga Mas Enam =

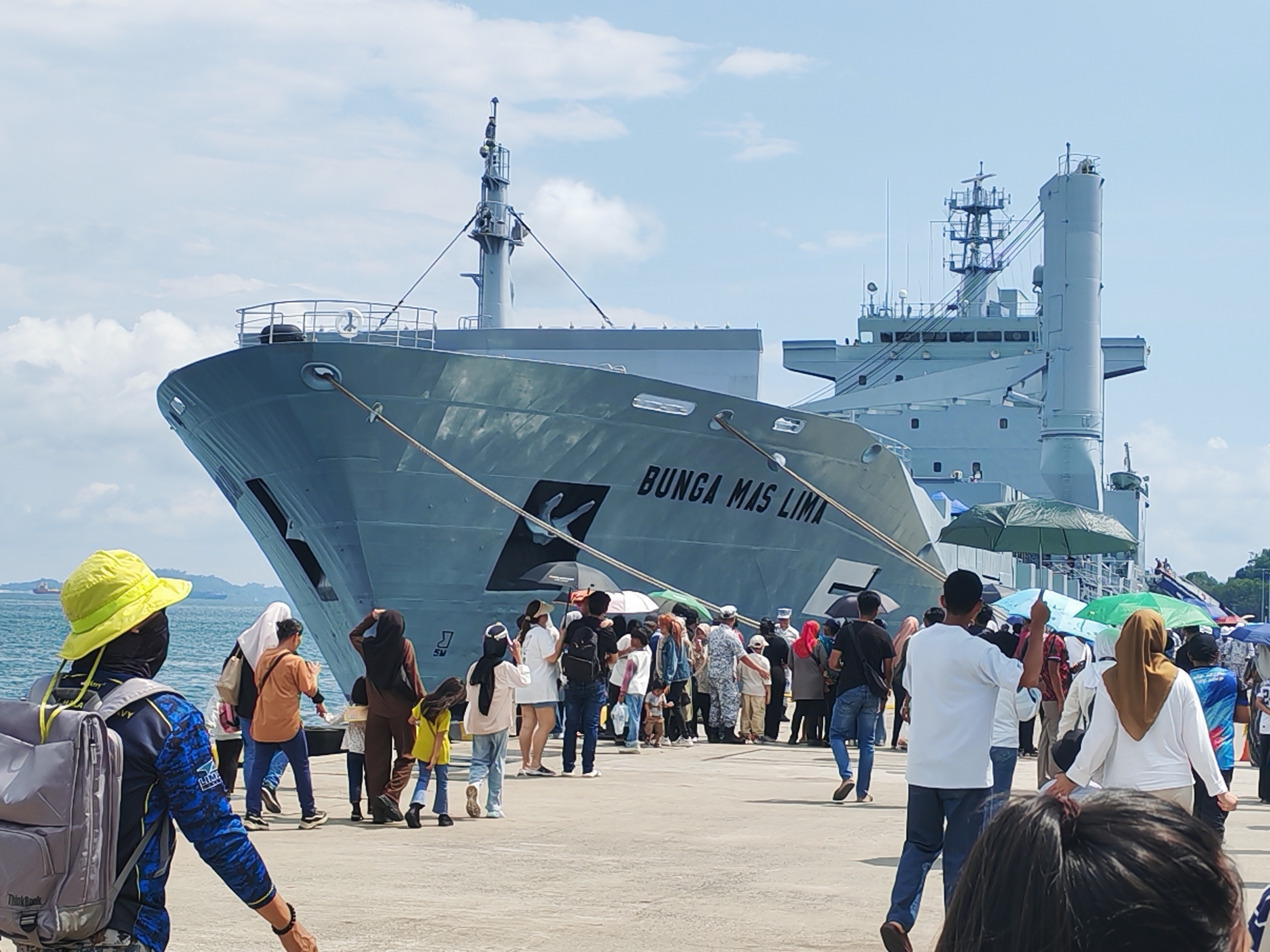
- KA Bunga Mas Lima which is the lead ship of the class

History

Malaysia
- Name: KA Bunga Mas 6 (BM6)
- Builder: Malaysian Marine and Heavy Engineering
- Launched: 1997
- Acquired: 9 August 2011
- Commissioned: 9 August 2011
- Decommissioned: 2023
- Identification: IMO number: 9121687; MMSI number: 533168000; Callsign: 9MC04
- Status: Retired
- Badge

General characteristics
- Type: Auxiliary multi-purpose support ship
- Displacement: 9,000 tonnes
- Length: 132.80 m (435.7 ft)
- Beam: 22.7 m (74 ft)
- Draught: 7.5 m (25 ft)
- Propulsion: Heavy Fuel Oil Tank (used for cruising) - 540 tonnes; Marine Diesel Oil Tank (used for generator) - 50 tonnes; Cylinder Oil Tank - 11,000 L (2,420 imp gal; 2,906 US gal); Fresh Water Tank - 980 tonnes
- Speed: 17.0 knots (31.5 km/h; 19.6 mph)
- Armament: Medium arms; FN MAG; FN Minimi; Mk 19 grenade launcher
- Aircraft carried: 1 × Fennec AS555 or Super Lynx
- Aviation facilities: Hangar; Helicopter landing platform

KA Bunga Mas Enam (BM6) is a container freighter purchased by the Royal Malaysian Navy and converted into an auxiliary ship. She is the second ship after KA Bunga Mas Lima (BM5).

== Development ==
Like her sister ship Bunga Mas Lima, Bunga Mas Enam was also a 699 TEUs container vessel where she is the second-listed Malaysian trading vessel that has been renovated and equipped with security equipment and weapons in order to protect and accompany MISC ships carrying national interests in the Gulf of Aden waters and surrounding waters. The renovation work was carried out by MMHE (a subsidiary of MISC) at its shipyard in Pasir Gudang, Johor. Bunga Mas Enam also patrols the Malaysian exclusive economic zone especially in Sabah to ensure the peace in Malaysia water.

== Scrapped ==
KA Bunga Mas Enam was stripped and disposed in 2023 and brought to India for scrapped.
