= Tarun Das =

Director-General - Confederation of Indian Industry (CII)

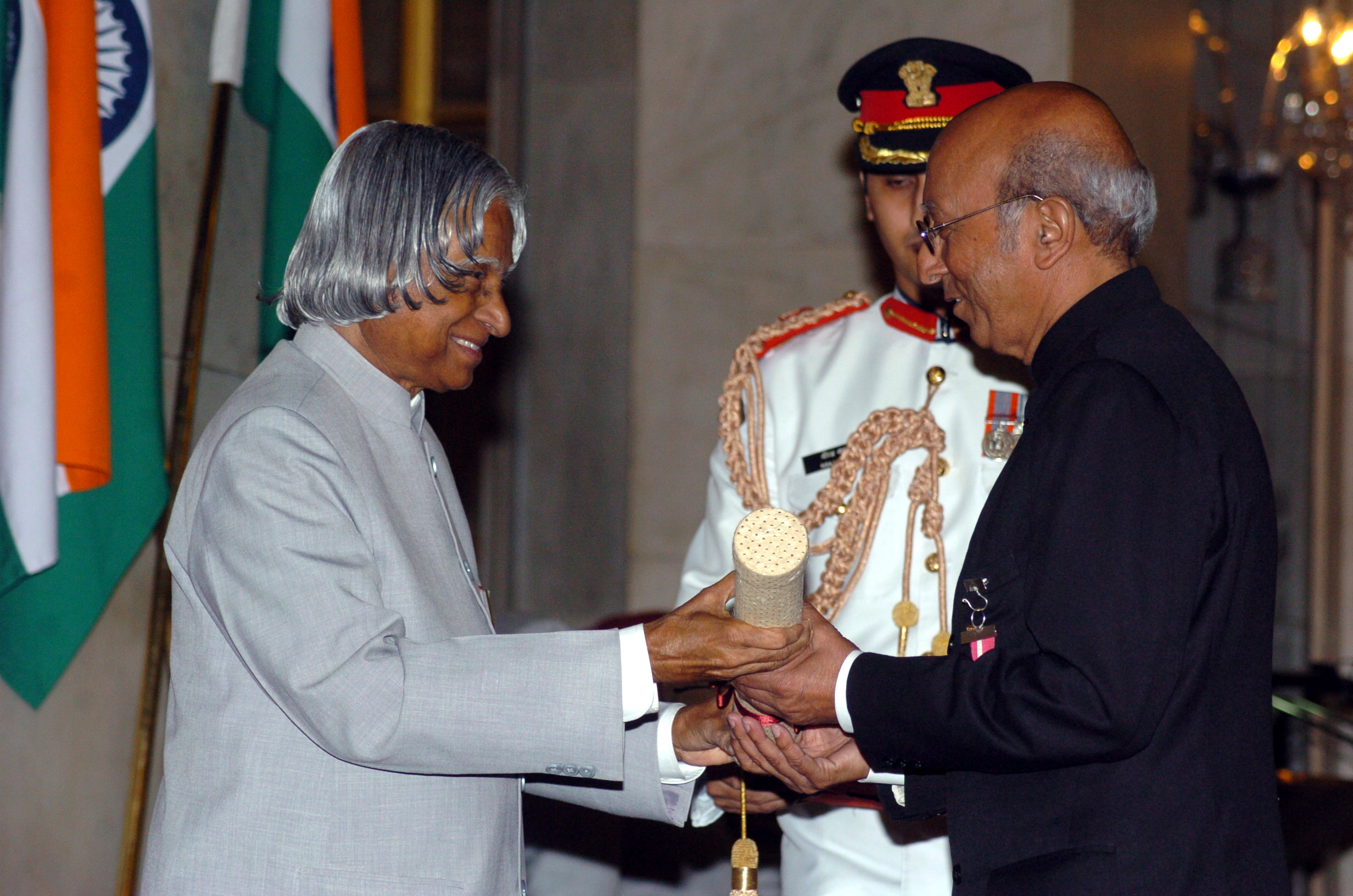
- The President, Dr. A.P.J. Abdul Kalam presenting Padma Bhushan to Tarun Das (right), at investiture ceremony in New Delhi on 29 March 2006.
- Born: West Bengal, India
- Occupation(s): Industrialist; Corporate executive
- Awards: Padma Bhushan; Honorary Citizenship of Singapore
- Website: Website

Tarun Das has dedicated his career to advancing the Indian industry. He served CII from 1967 to 2004 as its director general and from 2004 to 2009 as its chief mentor.

Currently, he is the chairman for Sasakawa-India Leprosy Foundation (S-ILF); chairman of advisory board, JCB India; and member of the international advisory board, Chubb Insurance (USA).

He is founding trustee of the Ananta Centre (AC) and the Ananta Aspen Centre (AAC) and director, Singapore India Partnership Foundation (SIPF). He is a life trustee at the Aspen Institute, USA and the Institute of Economic Growth (IEG).

He is co-chair, US-India Strategic Dialogue, India-Japan Strategic Dialogue and Member, India-Singapore Strategic Dialogue, India-China Strategic Dialogue, India-US Climate Change and Energy Dialogue, India-UK Climate Change and Energy Dialogue. He is India chair of the Trilateral Commission.

Das, who did his college education at the University of Calcutta and Manchester University, is a recipient of honoris causa degree of Doctor of Science (DSc) from the University of Warwick. He has chaired the U.S.-India Strategic Dialogue and the U.S.-India -Japan Strategic Dialogue and has served many corporate houses such as Haldia Petrochemicals, Associated Cement Companies, John Keells Holdings, Asian Hotels and Properties, Bajaj Auto Finance and New Delhi Television as their director. A former member of the international advisory board of Coca-Cola, he is a trustee of the Indian chapter of the Aspen Institute. The Government of India awarded him the third highest civilian honour of the Padma Bhushan, in 2006, for his contributions to Indian trade and industry. In January 2025, Tarun Das was conferred Honorary Citizenship by the Republic of Singapore, recognizing his significant contributions to strengthening the economic partnership between India and Singapore.

He has delivered several keynote addresses; his lecture on Adapting Indian industry to globalisation at the golden jubilee of the Forum for Free Entrepreneurs in Mumbai in 2006 is one such address. He has published a book, Crossing Frontiers: The Journey of Building CII, which is an account of his years at the Confederation of Indian Industry.

== See also ==
- Confederation of Indian Industry
