= MISC Berhad =

Malaysian shipping company

MISC Group
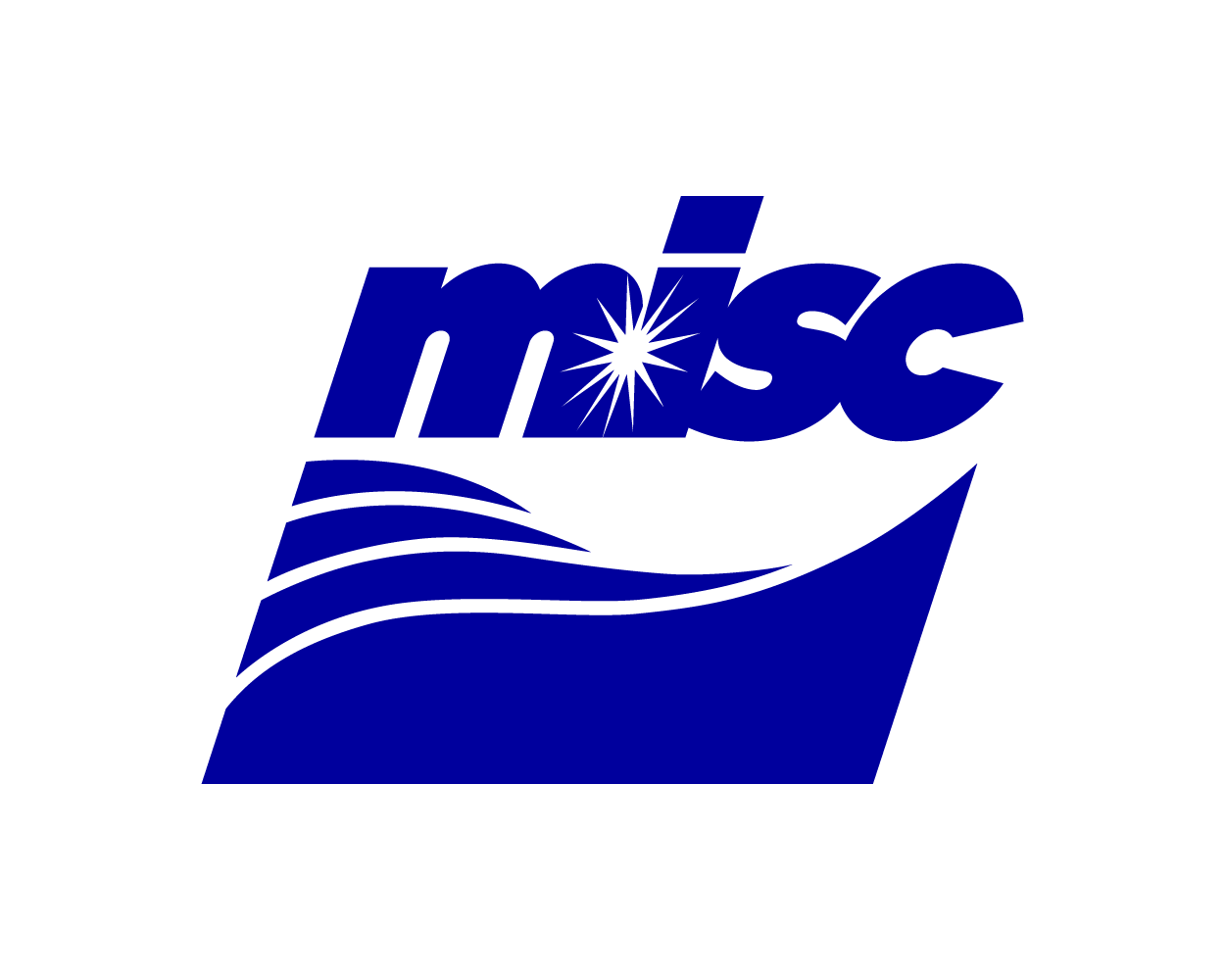
- Type: Public limited company
- Traded as: MYX: 3816
- ISIN: MYL3816OO005
- Industry: Energy shipping, Maritime services
- Founded: 1968
- Founders: Robert Kuok and Frank Tsao
- Headquarters: Kuala Lumpur, Malaysia
- Key people: Datuk Abu Huraira Abu Yazid, Chairman; Zahid Osman, President & Group Chief Executive Officer (MISC Berhad), Vice President, Petroleum & Products (MISC Berhad), President & Chief Executive Officer, (AET); Hazrin Hasan, Vice President (Gas Assets & Solutions); Alexander James Brigden, Vice President (Offshore); Mohd Nazir Mohd Nor, Vice President (Marine and Heavy Engineering, MISC Berhad), Managing Director & Chief Executive Officer, (Malaysia Marine and Heavy Engineering Holdings Berhad); Mohd Denny Mohd Isa, Vice President (Marine Services); Raja Azlan Shah Raja Azwa, Chief Officer (Strategy & Sustainability); Afendy Mohamed Ali, Chief Officer (Finance); Noridah Khamis, (General Counsel); Ruzila Binti Idin, Chief Officer (Human Resources)
- Products: Ship owning, Ship operating, Other shipping related activities, Owning and operating of offshore floating facilities as well as Marine repair, Marine conversion and Engineering & Construction works
- Website: miscgroup.com

MISC Berhad (MYX: 3816) was incorporated in 1968 as Malaysia International Shipping Corporation Berhad and is the leading international shipping line of Malaysia. In September 2005, Malaysia International Shipping Corporation Berhad adopted its present corporate identity and changed its name to MISC Berhad. Its main shareholder is Petroliam Nasional Berhad (Petronas), the national oil conglomerate of Malaysia. The principal business of the corporation consist of ship owning, ship operating, other shipping related activities, owning and operating of offshore floating facilities as well as marine repair, marine conversion and engineering and construction works. With a fleet of more than 120 vessels and a combined tonnage of more than 13,000,000 DWT.

== History ==
Malaysia International Shipping Corporation was founded in 1968 by Robert Kuok on request of the Malaysian government. Kuok, who had no experience in the business, sought the help of the Hong Kong-Chinese shipping magnate, Frank Tsao. For his help with establishing the business, Tsao was conferred the title of Tan Sri by the King of Malaysia.

== Business speciality ==
MISC is a specialist in Energy Transportation. The company HQ is located at Menara Dayabumi in Kuala Lumpur, Malaysia. With 29 LNG carriers, it is currently one of the world's leading operator of LNG fleet. Through its wholly owned subsidiary AET, MISC is one of the leading global tanker operators and a market leader in lightering operations for US Gulf ship-to-ship transfers.

MISC also freights vegetable oil and chemical products, with major trading routes that include South East Asia, the Far East, Middle East, Europe, the Indian Subcontinent and the Americas.

The company has also ventured into offshore business, offering customers a full scope of offshore floating facility services – from design to operations. Through Malaysia Marine and Heavy Engineering Sdn Bhd (MMHE), MISC provides marine repair, marine conversion, engineering and construction for a wide spectrum of oil & gas production facilities.

On 24 November 2011, MISC announced its exit from the liner business (container shipping). In its announcement through the local Bursa Malaysia stock exchange, MISC explained that the radical change in the operating dynamics of the liner industry which is driven by high operating cost and rapid changes in global trade patterns is challenging the validity of today's operating models.

== Other services ==
=== Maritime Education ===
- Malaysian Maritime Academy

== The fleet ==
The corporation operates a fleet of 125 vessels consisting of (as at February 2014):

- LNG Carriers
  - Seri "C" - Class, 5 launched
  - Seri "B" - Class, 5 ship (452,319 CBM)
  - Seri "A" - Class, 5 ships (417,388 CBM)
  - Puteri Satu - Class, 6 ships (456,648 CBM)
  - Puteri - Class, 5 ships (367,595 CBM)
  - Tenaga - Class, 3 ships (215,248 CBM)
  - Aman - Class, 2 ships (32,909 CBM)
  - Note: Tenaga Satu and Tenaga Empat have been converted into LNG Floating Storage Units

(FSUs) for the Petronas LNG Regasification Facilities project in Sungai Udang, Malacca.

- Petroleum Tankers
  - VLCC - Class, 13 ships (3,976,758 DWT)
  - Aframax - Class, 50 ships (5,329,472 DWT)
  - Suezmax - Class, 4 ships (631,399 DWT)
  - DP Shuttle - Class, 2 ships (210,306 DWT)
  - Panamax - Class, 1 ships (73,096 DWT)
  - CPP - Class, 5 ships (234,962 DWT)
- 22 Chemical Tankers
  - Melati Class, 1 ship (31,981 DWT)
  - Bunga A Class, 7 ships (266,000 DWT)
  - Bunga B Class, 4 ships (180,000 DWT)
  - Bunga L Class, 6 ships (114,000 DWT)
  - Bunga Kantan Class, 3 ships (59,322 DWT)
  - Others, 2 ships (40,413 DWT)
- Offshore Assets
  - FPSO, 5 units
  - FSO, 5 units
  - MOPU, 2 units
  - Semi-FPS, 1 unit

== Incidents ==
- On 19 August 2008 at 10.09 pm, one of the MISC vessel registered as MT Bunga Melati Dua has been hijacked by a group of armed pirates at the Gulf of Aden, between Yemen and Somalia. There were 29 Malaysian nationals and 10 Philippine nationals on board the ship when the incident occurred. According to Bernama, MISC together with International Maritime Bureau (IMB) has formed a special team to tackle the problem on the attack.
- On 29 August 2008 at 9.50 pm another MISC tanker ship registered as MT Bunga Melati Lima also has been hijacked in international waters off the coast of Yemen. According to MISC press statement, there are 36 Malaysians and five Filipino temporary maintenance crew members on board, the vessel was fully laden with 30,000 Mt of petrochemicals when the pirates boarded it on Friday evening.
- On 22 January 2011 MISC tanker vessel Bunga Laurel was Hijacked by Somali pirates. The previous Container vessel Bunga Mas Lima, which now is converted as military escort vessel, has rescued all 23 crew members. All 18 pirates surrendered.
- On 26 July 2012, Bunga Alpinia, one of MISC oil tankers, caught fire while filling methanol in Labuan's Petronas Chemicals Group Berhad's jetty at 2.32am after being struck by a lightning during the bad weather. Beside the vessel itself, bulk vessel, MV Heroic, also were closed to that vessel. Because it was berthed near Rancha-Rancha village, a series of mega explosions were heard across the village and prompts Sabah Electricity to cut electrical supplements to the houses near to the razed vessel. 6 crew were killed and 24 others were rescued by nearby offshore vessels and TLDM and MMEA vessels. The perished crews were Syahril Azmi Baharudin, 28, and Khalil Mohd Hanafi, 24, both from Melaka, Muhd Nazrin Khamsani, 24, from Kuala Lumpur, Zahari Hassim, 46, from Negeri Sembilan and a Filipino, Colanggoy Calaluan Errol, 22. All were presumably missing in initial reports. A group of offshore vessels, led by MV Pacific Hawk, successfully extinguished the flames at 7.05am on next day.

== See also ==
- Johor Port
- Kuantan Port
- Port Klang
- Port of Tanjung Pelepas
