= Malaysian Maritime Enforcement Agency =

Coast Guard of Malaysia

Malaysian Maritime Enforcement Agency Agensi Penguatkuasaan Maritim Malaysia اڬينسي ڤڠواتكواس ماريتيم مليسيا
- Malaysia Coast Guard racing stripe

- Malaysia Coast Guard logo

- Malaysia Coast Guard ensign
- Common name: Malaysia Coast Guard
- Abbreviation: MMEA / APMM
- Motto: "Mengawal, Melindung, Menyelamat" "Guard, Protect, Save"

Agency overview
- Formed: 15 February 2005
- Employees: 4,500 personnel
- Legal personality: Governmental: Government agency

Jurisdictional structure
- National agency (Operations jurisdiction): Malaysia
- Operations jurisdiction: Malaysia
- Legal jurisdiction: Malaysian Maritime Zone
- Governing body: Government of Malaysia
- Constituting instrument: Malaysian Maritime Enforcement Agency Act 2004 [Act 633]
- Specialist jurisdiction: Coastal patrol, marine border protection, marine search and rescue

Operational structure
- Headquarters: Federal Government Administrative Centre Putrajaya
- Minister responsible: Saifuddin Nasution Ismail, Minister of Home Affairs
- Agency executive: Adm (M) Datuk Haji Mohd Rosli bin Abdullah, Director General
- Parent agency: Ministry of Home Affairs

Facilities
- Patrol vessels: 75
- Patrol boats/Auxiliarys: 258
- Helicopters: AgustaWestland AW149; AgustaWestland AW139; Aérospatiale AS 365 Dauphin II
- Amphibious aircraft: Bombardier 415
- UAVs: Thales Fulmar; ALTI Transition; Havelsan BAHA

Website
- www.mmea.gov.my

The Malaysian Maritime Enforcement Agency (Abbr.; MMEA) (Note: Malay: Agensi Penguatkuasaan Maritim Malaysia – APMM; Jawi: (اڬينسي ڤڠواتكواس ماريتيم مليسيا)) formally known as Malaysia Coast Guard for international identification, is the coast guard organisation of Malaysia, and principal government agency tasked with maintaining law and order, and coordinating search and rescue operations in the Malaysian Maritime Zone and on the high seas.

The Agency and its members are part of the Malaysian Federal Civil Agency and report directly to the Ministry of Home Affairs. The MMEA however, can be integrated under Malaysian Armed Forces command during an emergency, special crisis, or wartime.

The agency maintains close ties with the United States Coast Guard (USCG) and Japan Coast Guard (JCG).

== History ==
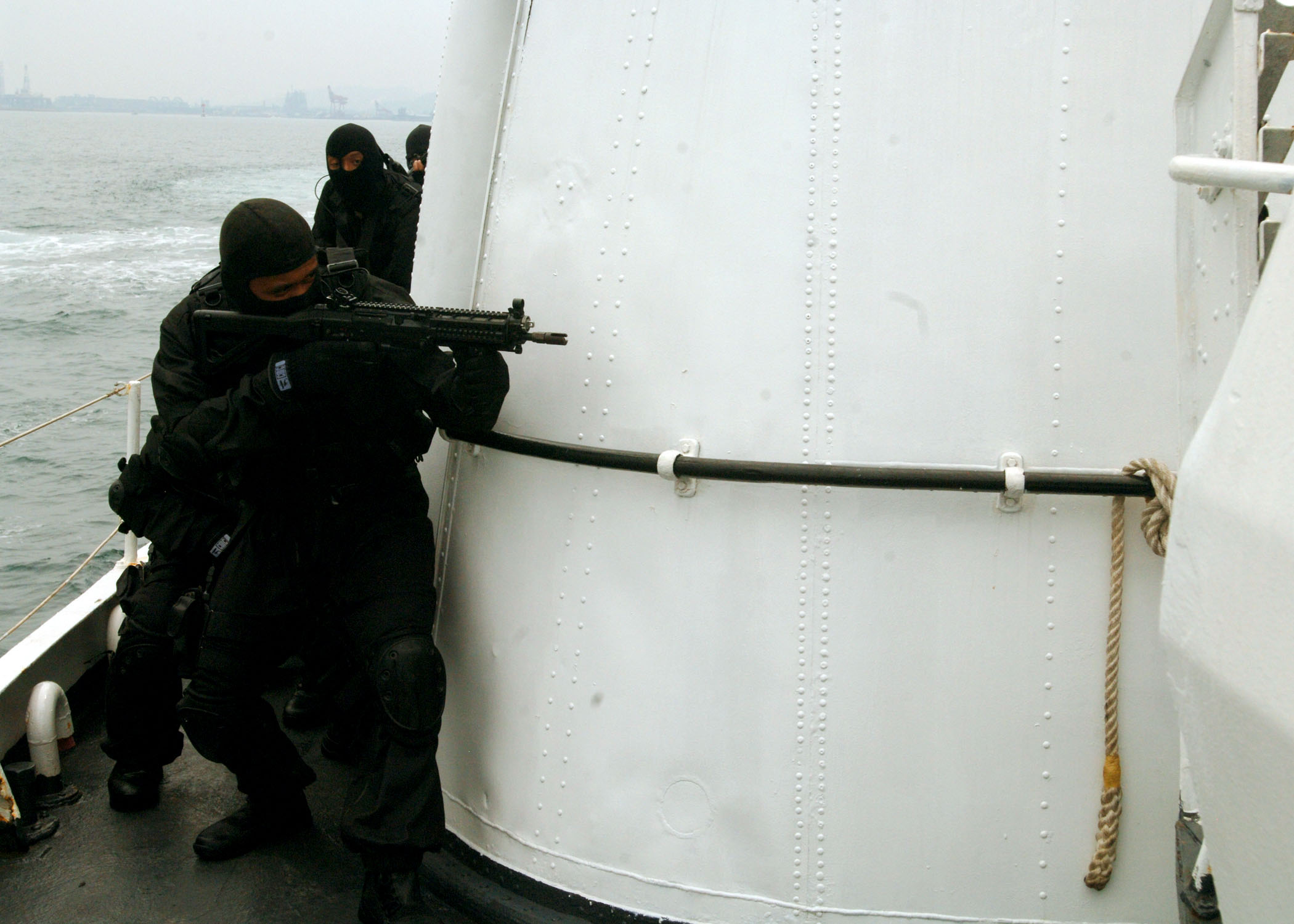
Members of MMEA during training.

The history of the Malaysian Maritime Enforcement Agency (MMEA) began with the report on the 'Feasibility Study on the Establishment of Malaysian Coastguard' conducted by National Security Council, Prime Minister's Department on 21 April 1999.

The findings of the report agreed to by the Cabinet of Malaysia and on 16 April 2003, a Nucleus Team led by Datuk Abu Talib Haji Harun, was created with the objective of organising the creation of the Agency. The Agency was formally established with the enactment of the Malaysian Maritime Enforcement Agency Act 2004 [Act 633] by the Malaysian Parliament in May 2004. Subsequently, the Act received the Royal Assent from the Yang di-Pertuan Agong on 25 June 2004 and was gazetted on 1 July of the same year. On 15 February 2005, the Act came into force.

The Agency was introduced to the public on 10 October 2005 by then Deputy Prime Minister, Dato' Seri Najib Razak and achieved operational status on 30 November 2005 with the commencement of patrols by MMEA vessels.

On 21 March 2006, MMEA is officially launched as a part of a Malaysian government agency by the Deputy Prime Minister.

=== Rebrand as Malaysia Coast Guard ===
On 28 April 2017, the MMEA is formally rebranded to the 'Malaysia Coast Guard' for international identification. New vessels being delivered to the service, including the New Generation Patrol Craft (NGPC) will feature this new name on their respective liveries. However the name 'Malaysian Maritime Enforcement Agency' will be retained in the meantime for working purposes.

=== Reassigned to the Ministry of Home Affairs ===
In May 2018, under the Malaysian new government, MMEA was planned to be consolidated to the Ministry of Home Affairs. In November 2018, under Malaysia's Budget 2019, the decision was finalised.

== Function and responsibility ==
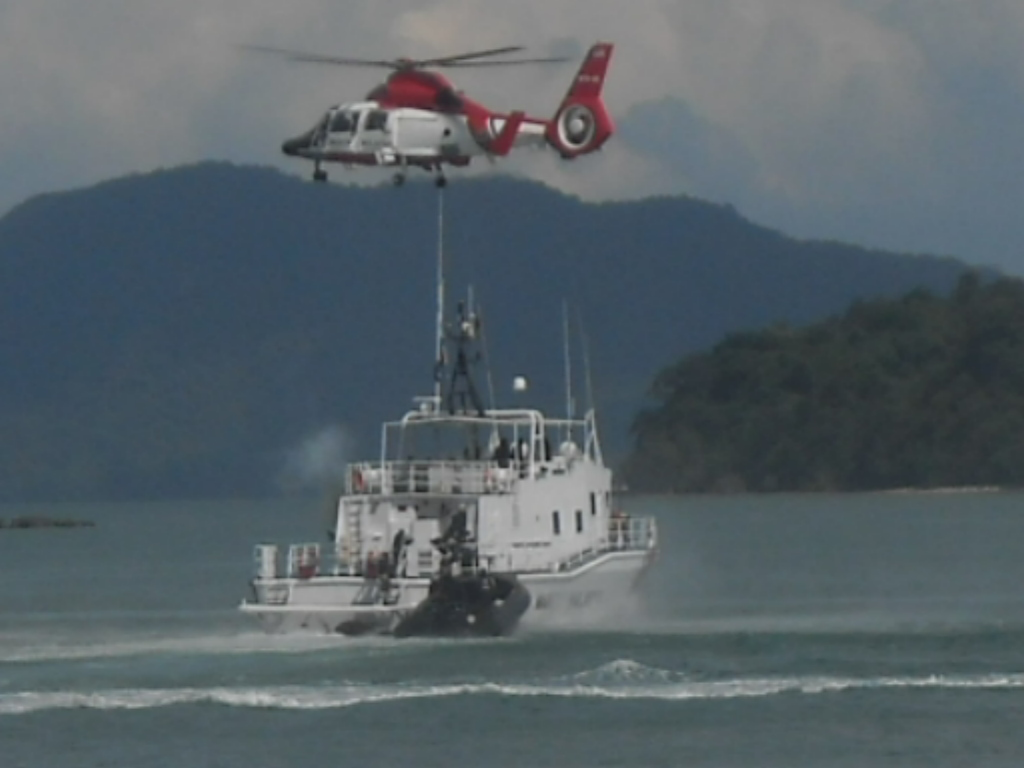
MMEA elite force Special Task And Rescue (STAR) conducting demonstration.

1. Enforce law and order under any federal law in the Malaysian Maritime Zone
2. Performing maritime search and rescue tasks in the Malaysian Maritime Zone and in the high seas
3. Prevent and suppress the commission of offences in the Malaysian Maritime Zone
4. Providing assistance in any criminal matter at the request of foreign nations as provided under the Mutual Assistance in Criminal Matters Act 2002 [Act 621]
5. Conduct air and coast monitoring
6. Establish and manage maritime institutions for Agency's officer training
7. To perform any duty to ensure maritime prosperity and security or to do all things incidental thereto
8. At high seas:
  - Perform maritime search and rescue tasks
  - Control and prevent maritime pollution in the high seas
  - Prevent and suppress piracy
  - Prevent and suppress the illegal distribution of narcotic drugs
9. During a state of emergency, special crisis, or war, this agency or any part of the agency is put under the control of the General Command of the Malaysian Armed Forces

== Malaysian maritime zone ==
=== Internal waters and territorial sea ===
- Territorial Sea: 12 nautical miles (22 km) from baseline
- Sovereignty: part of the territory of Malaysia.
- Subject to the right of innocent passage for all vessels

=== Contiguous zone ===
- 12 nautical miles from coast and not exceeded more than 24 nm.
- Jurisdiction to prevent or punish infringement of customs, fiscal, immigration or sanitary laws.

=== Exclusive economic zone (EEZ) ===
- 200 nautical miles (370 km) from coast.
- Sovereign rights over the management of the resources of the seabed and water column.
- Jurisdiction in respect of: - construction of artificial islands- marine scientific research - protection and preservation of the marine environment.
- Subject to the rights of other States including: freedoms of navigation, overflight, and laying of submarine cables.

=== Continental shelf ===
- 200 nautical miles (370 km) or to the extent of the continental margin.
- Sovereign rights over the management of the resources of the seabed but not the water column.
- Jurisdiction in respect of: -construction of artificial islands - drilling on the continental shelf.
- Subject to the rights of other States including freedoms of navigation, overflight, laying of submarine cables and revenue sharing.

== Organisation ==
=== Director general ===
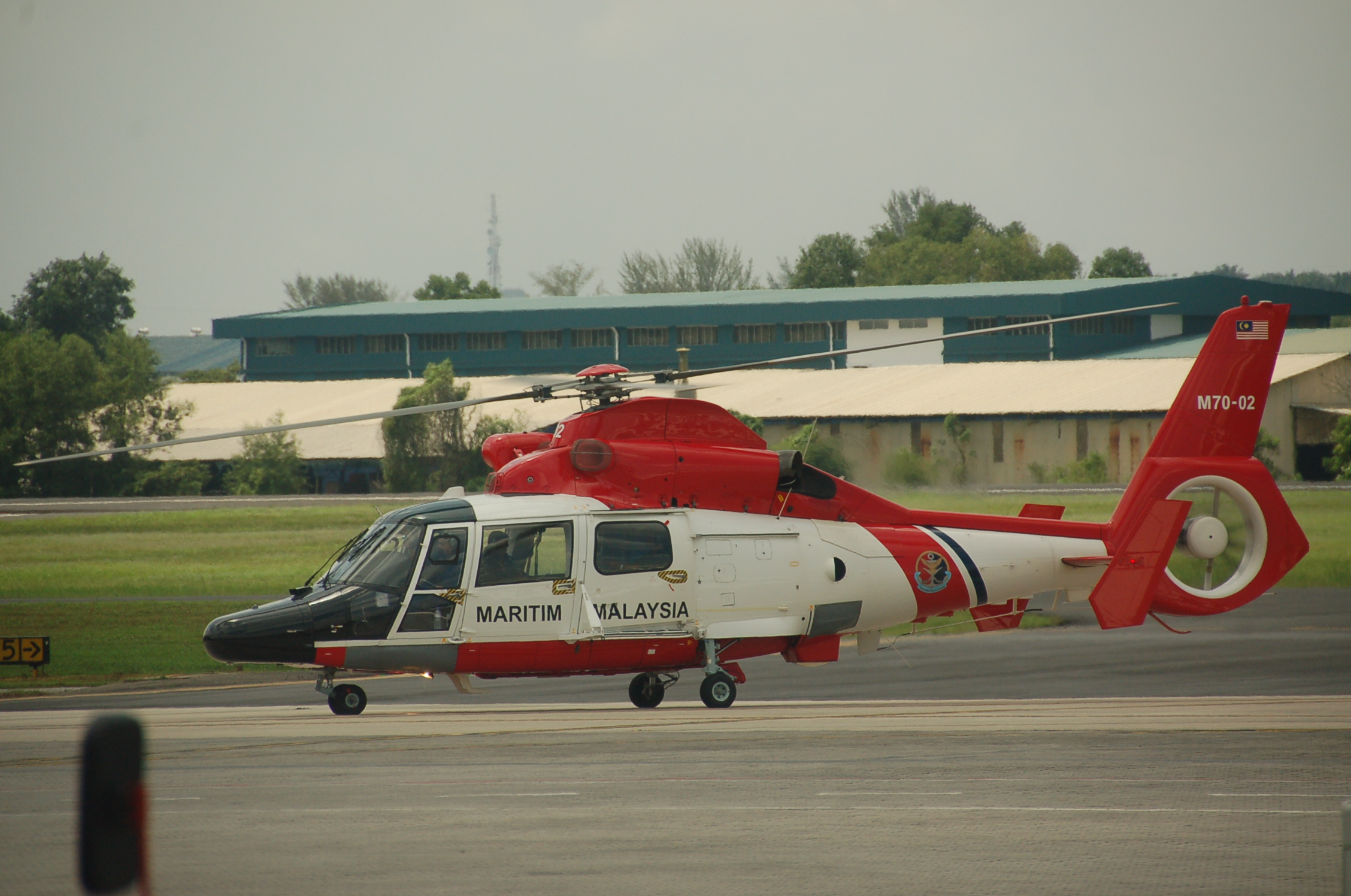
AS365 Dauphin helicopter of MMEA.

A Director General of Malaysian Maritime Enforcement Agency appointed by the Yang Di Pertuan Agong (King) on the advice of the prime minister under Section 4(1) of the Act is responsible for the operational direction, command, control and supervision of the Agency. Administratively, the Director General reports directly to the Chief Secretary to the Government. By virtue of his office, he is also the head of the Malaysian Maritime Enforcement Service. The Director General is assisted by three Deputy Directors General, each responsible for Management, Operations and Logistics. The post is an open one enabling any civil, military or police officer to be appointed to the post. For the purposes of discipline, the Director General is considered to be a member of the general public service of the Federation under Section 4(4).

=== Officers and other ranks ===
The officers and other ranks of the MMEA are appointed by the Public Service Commission as Maritime Enforcement Service officers under Section 5(1) of the Act and are considered civil servants under the Malaysian Civil Service. The Agency also consists of officers and staff from various other Services such as the Administrative and Diplomatic Service, Judicial and Legal Service, Information System Service and others. This personnel are primarily involved in matters of administration, finance, procurement, human resource management, legal affairs and prosecution, and information technology.

=== Ranks ===
Ranks for officers and other ranks in the Agency are derived from the Royal Malaysian Navy, but lack the executive curl on the cuff rank sleeves. Officer and Warrant Officer insignia are similar to that of their naval counterparts. Chevrons are used to denote the ranks of Chief Petty Officer and below.

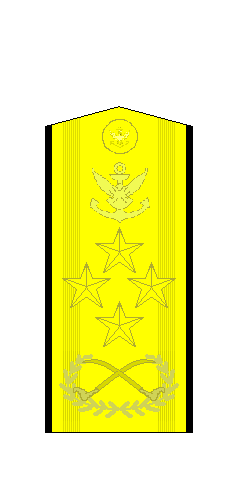
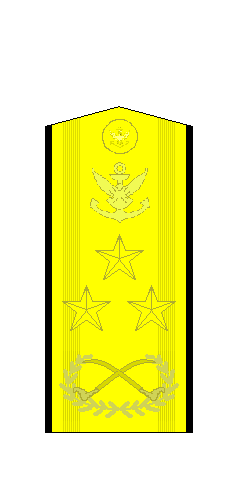
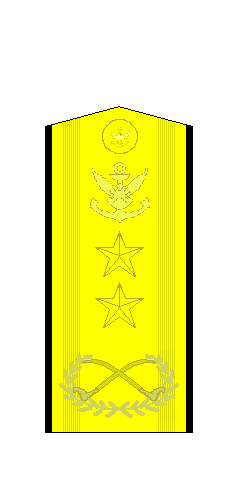
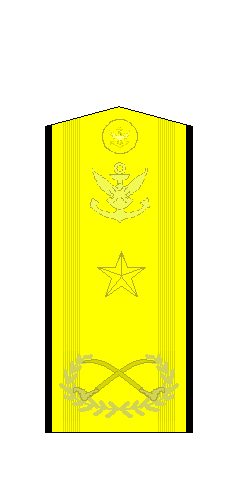
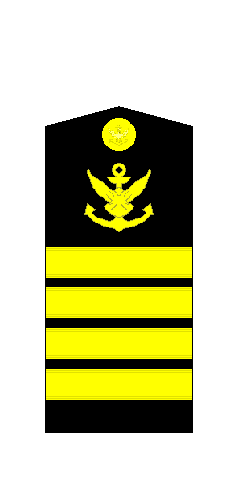
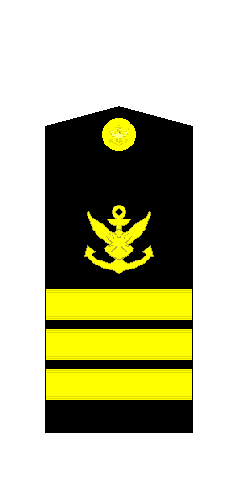
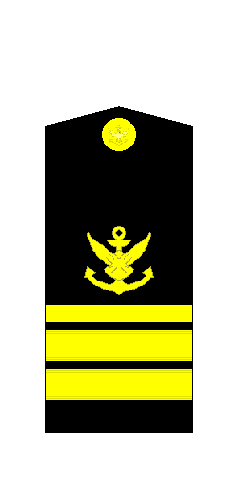
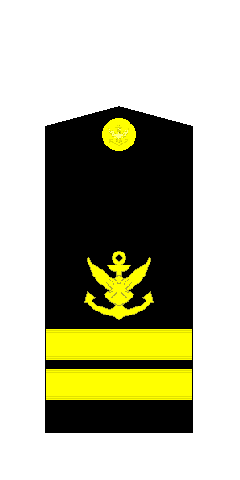
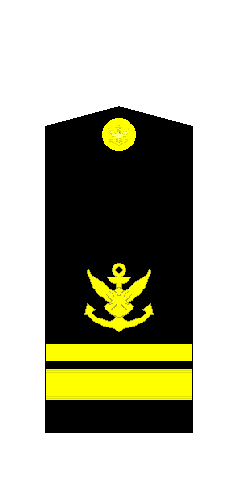
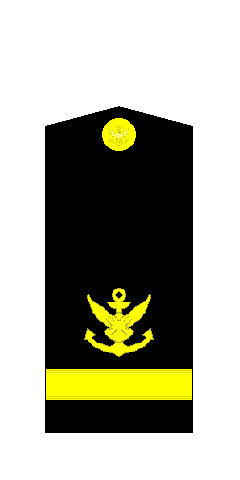
Rank group	General/flag officers				Senior officers			Junior officers
Malaysian Maritime Enforcement Agency
Malaysian Maritime Enforcement Agency	Laksamana Maritim	Laksamana madya Maritim	Laksamana muda Maritim	Laksamana pertama Maritim	Kepten Maritim	Komander Maritim	Leftenan komander Maritim	Leftenan Maritim	Leftenan madya Maritim	Leftenan muda Maritim
Maritime Enforcement Service Grade	Premier Grade A	Premier Grade B	Premier Grade C	T14	T13	T12	T11	T10	T9	T8
Equivalent Civil Service Grade	Premier Grade A	Premier Grade B	Premier Grade C	Grade 54	Grade 52	Grade 48	Grade 46A	Grade 44	Grade 42	Grade 41

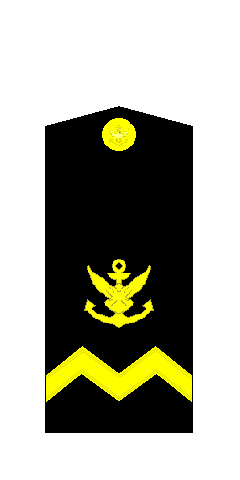
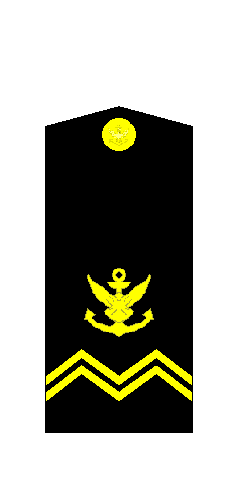
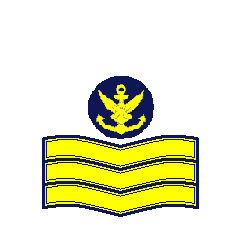
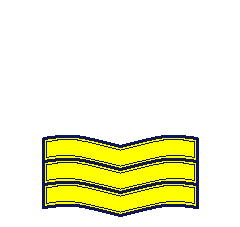
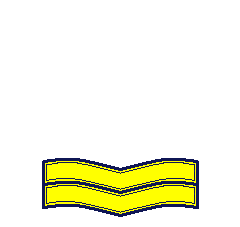
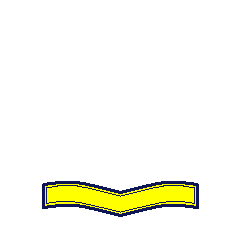
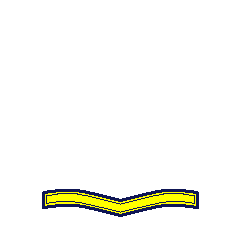
Rank group	Senior NCOs				Junior NCOs		Enlisted
Malaysian Maritime Enforcement Agency								No insignia
Malaysian Maritime Enforcement Agency	Pegawai waran I Maritim	Pegawai waran II Maritim	Bintara Kanan Maritim	Bintara Muda Maritim	Laskar Kanan Maritim	Laskar Kelas I Maritim	Laskar Kelas II Maritim	Perajurit Muda Maritim
Maritime Enforcement Service Grade	T7	T6	T5	T4	T3	T2	T1
Equivalent Civil Service Grade	Grade 38	Grade 36	Grade 34	Grade 29	Grade 22	Grade 20	Grade 19

=== Headquarters ===
The headquarters of the Agency is situated at One IOI Square, IOI Resort, Putrajaya, close to the federal administrative centre of Malaysia. The Agency HQ was formerly based in Cyberjaya before it shifted to the present address in April 2006.

=== Academy ===
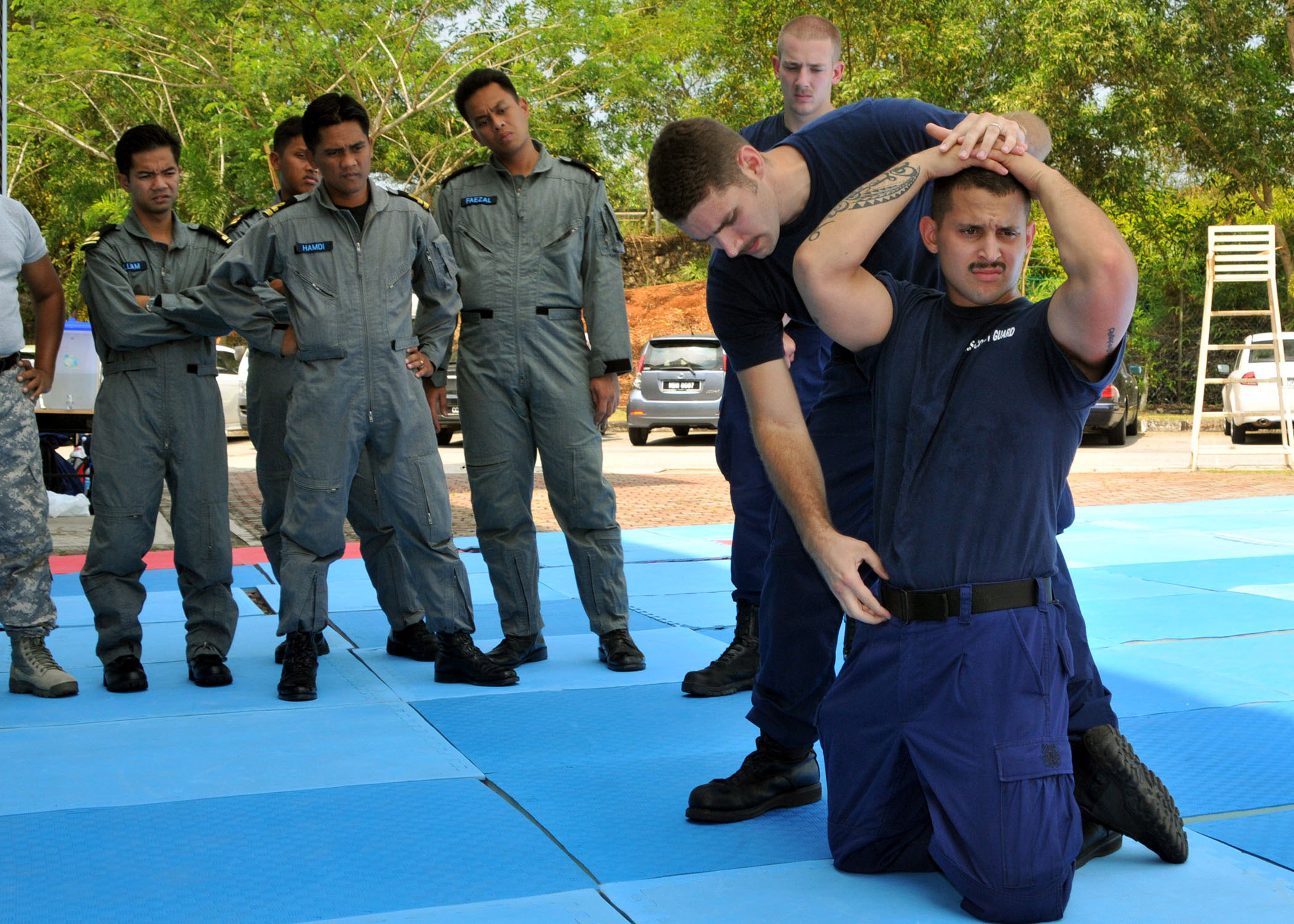
MMEA exercises with US Coast Guard.

The Akademi Maritim Sultan Ahmad Shah (AMSAS) or Malaysian Maritime Enforcement Agency Academy is a coast guard academy. It is located at Gebeng near Kuantan, Pahang.

=== Operational areas ===
The operational area of the Agency is the Malaysian Maritime Zone which is divided into 5 Maritime Regions consisting of 18 Maritime Districts.

West Malaysia Maritime Zone
Region	Operational Area	Regional Headquarters
Northern Peninsular Maritime Region	Langkawi Island-Bernam River	Langkawi, Kedah
District	Operational Area	Headquarters
Maritime District 1	Langkawi Island-Kuala Muda	Bukit Malut, Langkawi, Kedah
Maritime District 2	Kuala Muda-Parit Buntar	Batu Uban, Penang
Maritime District 3	Parit Buntar-Bernam River	Lumut, Perak
Region	Operational Area	Regional Headquarters
Southern Peninsular Maritime Region	Bernam River-Endau	Johor Bahru, Johor
District	Operational Area	Headquarters
Maritime District 4	Bernam River-Sepang	Port Klang, Selangor
Maritime District 5	Sepang-Kuala Kesang	Kuala Linggi, Malacca
Maritime District 6	Kuala Kesang-Johor Causeway	Johor Bahru, Johor
Maritime District 7	Johore Causeway-Endau	Tanjung Sedili, Johor
Region	Operational Area	Regional Headquarters
Eastern Peninsular Maritime Region	Endau-Tumpat	Kuantan, Pahang
District	Operational Area	Headquarters
Maritime District 8	Endau-Tanjung Geliga	Kuantan, Pahang
Maritime District 9	Tanjung Geliga-Besut	Kuala Terengganu, Terengganu
Maritime District 10	Besut-Tumpat	Tok Bali, Pasir Puteh, Kelantan
East Malaysia Maritime Zone
Region	Operational Area	Regional Headquarters
Sarawak Maritime Region	Tanjung Datu-Tanjung Baram	Kuching, Sarawak
District	Operational Area	Headquarters
Maritime District 11	Tanjung Datu-Igan	Kuching, Sarawak
Maritime District 12	Igan-Tanjung Payong	Bintulu, Sarawak
Maritime District 13	Tanjung Payong-Tanjung Baram	Miri, Sarawak
Region	Operational Area	Regional Headquarters
Sabah Maritime Region	Tanjung Baram-Pulau Sebatik	Kota Kinabalu, Sabah
District	Operational Area	Headquarters
Maritime District 14	Tanjung Baram-Kuala Penyu	Labuan
Maritime District 15	Kuala Penyu-Kampung Mendawang	Kota Kinabalu, Sabah
Maritime District 16	Kampung Mendawang-Beluran	Kudat, Sabah
Maritime District 17	Beluran-Kunak	Sandakan, Sabah
Maritime District 18	Kunak-Pulau Sebatik	Tawau, Sabah

=== Special forces ===
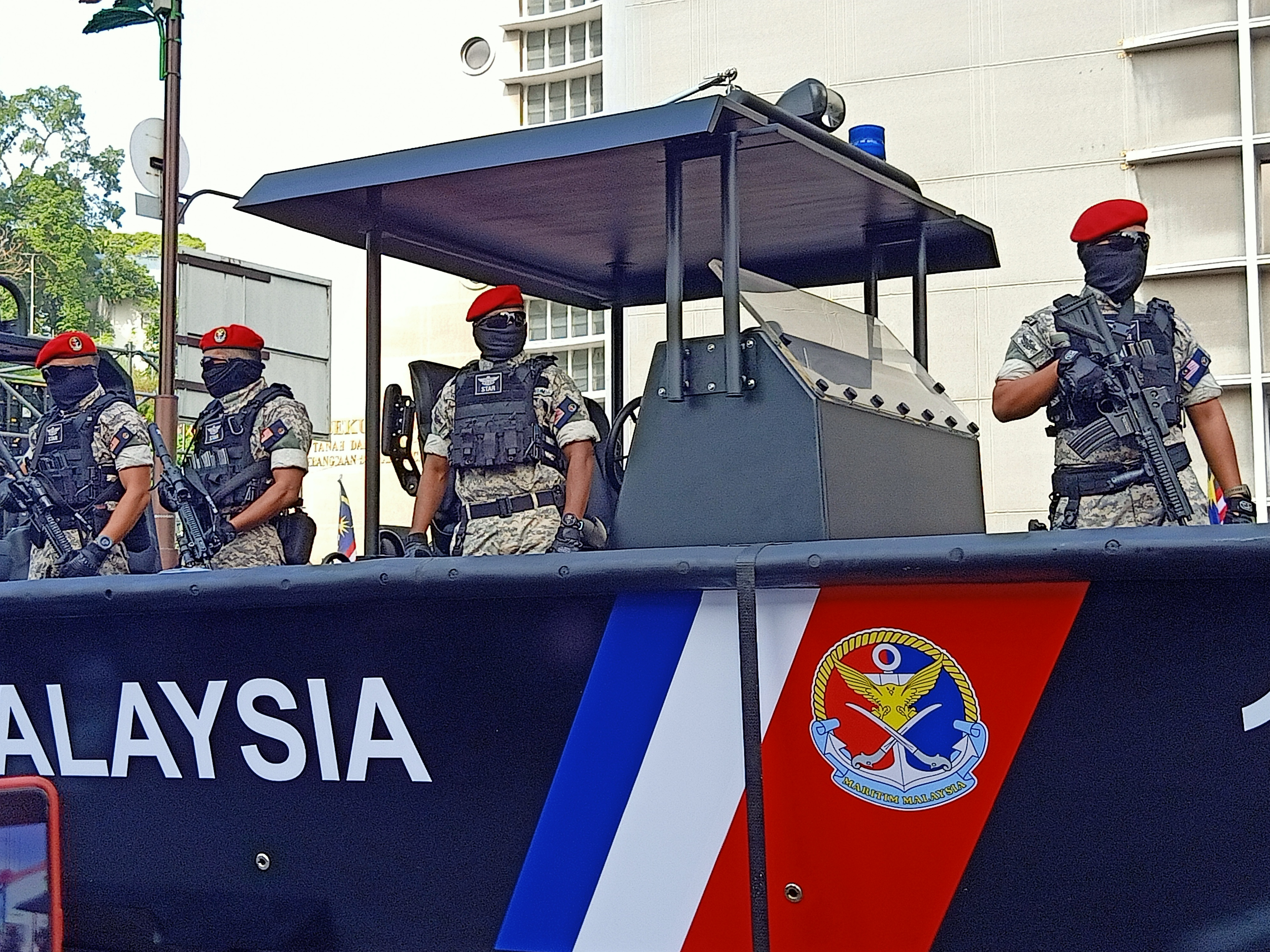
MMEA elite force Special Task And Rescue (STAR) arms with Heckler & Koch HK416 rifles in the patrol boat during the 65th Merdeka Day in Kuala Lumpur.

The MMEA currently have its own elite special force unit called the STAR (Special Task and Rescue). It is composed of members from the Royal Malaysian Air Force's (RMAF) PASKAU and Royal Malaysian Navy's (RMN) PASKAL. Their task is to perform hostage rescue operations in shallow waters that are under MMEA's jurisdiction. They are also tasked to do counter-terrorism missions in Malaysian waters alongside the RMN. The STAR is considerably well trained as its members are taken from RMAF and the RMN special forces units.

On 2 July 2009, the first batch of fresh commando units graduated from Basic Commando Selection alongside the Royal Malaysian Air Force PASKAU. They were given American-styled ACUs (Army Combat Uniform), maya blue PASKAU's berets and also the Malaysian Army zebra woodland camouflage uniform.

== List of director general ==
1. Laksamana Maritim Dato’ Mohamad bin Nik (30 November 2005 – 14 March 2008)

2. Laksamana Maritim Datuk Mohd Amdan bin Kurish (5 May 2008 – 9 September 2015)

3. Laksamana Maritim Datuk Ahmad Puzi bin Ab Kahar (9 September 2015 – 27 May 2017)

4. Laksamana Maritim Datuk Zulkifili bin Abu Bakar (1 June 2017 – 5 August 2019)

5. Laksamana Maritim Datuk Mohd Zubil bin Mat Som (19 August 2019 – 19 March 2023)

6. Laksamana Maritim Datuk Hamid bin Amin (6 November 2023 – 19 April 2024)

== Present development ==
In 2015, Malaysia signed a contract worth RM380 million (US$96.8 million) to order six-ship known as the Bagan Datuk-class patrol vessel. The ship was design based on German-based Fassmer Shipbuilding Company. The first ship is expected to be delivered by December 2016 while the last ship is expected to be delivered by June 2018. The ship will also be equipped with Spanish-Aerovision Fulmar UAVs. In September 2016, the Japanese government through its Prime Minister Shinzō Abe have promise to give Malaysia patrol vessels that will be sent in the first half of 2017 following similar agreements with the Philippines and Vietnam. The military vessels, which previously used by the Japan Coast Guard will be handed over free of charge to Malaysia to counter Chinese military activities in the waters of Malaysia. Three new Tun Fatimah-class offshore patrol vessel also ordered by Malaysia in 2017 to boost up patrol capabilities. In February 2020, The Home Ministry has approved the procurement of four helicopters worth RM600 million for the Malaysian Maritime Enforcement Agency (MMEA). In December 2023, it is reported that US House of Representative Foreign Affairs Committee agreed to transfers Reliance-class cutters to MMEA.

To strengthen patrol fleet, MMEA acquired Multi-Purpose Mission Ship from Turkey in 2025.

== In popular culture ==
=== In film ===
- Coast Guard Malaysia: Ops Helang is a 2023 action film starring Saharul Ridzwan and Adlin Aman Ramlie, which tells the story of a Special Task and Rescue (STAR) officer against a group of maritime militants, and his mission to save his family.

=== On television ===
The MMEA has been featured in several TV series, including:

- TQ Captain (2018), Hisyam Hamid portrays Lieutenant Adam Alahudin, a commanding officer boat patrol MMEA who aired in Astro Ria.
- 999 (Malaysian TV series), TV3, where various case related to MMEA were covered since 2006.
- Malaysia Hari Ini, TV3.
- Majalah 3, TV3.
- Selamat Pagi Malaysia, RTM.

== See also ==
- Malaysian Armed Forces
  - Malaysian Army
  - Royal Malaysian Navy
  - Royal Malaysian Air Force
- Royal Malaysia Police
- Royal Johor Military Force
- Joint Forces Command
