= Malaysia Marine and Heavy Engineering =

Malaysian shipyard company

Malaysia Marine and Heavy Engineering Holdings Berhad
- Formerly: MSE Holdings Berhad
- Company type: Public limited company
- Traded as: MYX: 5186
- ISIN: MYL5186OO001
- Industry: Shipbuilding; Energy solutions provider; Heavy engineering; Marine repair
- Founded: 1989; 37 years ago
- Headquarters: Kuala Lumpur, Malaysia
- Key people: Mohd Nazir bin Mohd Nor (CEO); Mohammad Suhaimi bin Mohd Yasin (Chairman)
- Products: Ship; Offshore construction Offshore conversion Marine repair
- Revenue: ▲RM 1.65 billion (2022); RM 1.47 billion (2021)
- Total assets: ▼RM 3.36 billion (2022); RM 3.39 billion (2021)
- Total equity: ▲RM 1.76 billion (2022); RM 1.70 billion (2021)
- Number of employees: 3365 (2022)
- Website: www.mhb.com.my

Malaysia Marine and Heavy Engineering Holdings Berhad (abbreviated MHB: MYX: 5186) is a Malaysian owned shipbuilding and heavy engineering industries company. It was formerly known as Malaysia Shipyard and Engineering Sdn Bhd. MHB has been long involved in oil and gas engineering and construction works.

In March 2004, Malaysia International Shipping Corporation Bhd (MISC) increased its shareholding in MMHE to 65%, making it the majority shareholder of the company.

== History ==
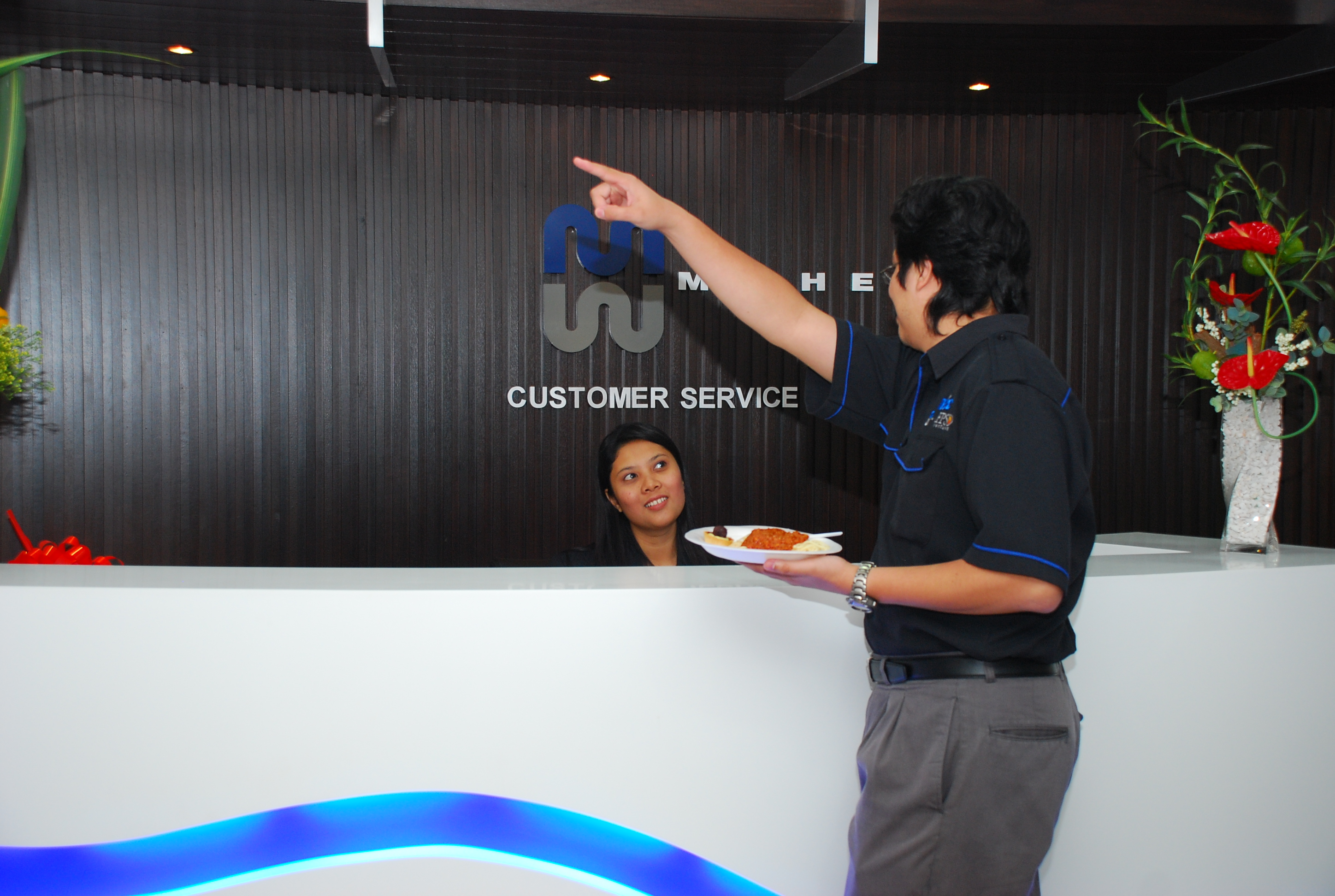
Customer service in MHB office

MHB was incorporated in Malaysia in 1989 as a private limited company, under the name MSE Holdings Sdn Bhd. In June 2010, when MSE Holdings was upgraded into a public company, its name was changed to Malaysia Marine and Heavy Engineering Holdings Berhad (MHB).

On 29 October 2010, MHB was successfully listed on the Main Market of Bursa Malaysia Securities Berhad, with its initial public offering (IPO) raising of RM2.03 billion. The IPO was the first in Malaysia to be conducted with an international strategic investor, Technip S.A. of France, a renowned player in project management, engineering and construction in the oil and gas industry.

The history of MHB dates back to the incorporation of its wholly owned subsidiary, Malaysia Marine and Heavy Engineering Sdn Bhd (MMHE) in May 1973, under the name of Malaysia Shipyard and Engineering Sdn Bhd (MSE). MSE was established by the Government to advance Malaysia's maritime industrialisation programme. It was subsequently privatised and in 2006, became a wholly owned subsidiary of MISC Berhad. Being within the MISC Group of companies enabled the two organisations to align their goals and objectives to create greater synergies.

One of MHB's achievements was the completion of the Floating Production Storage and Offloading (FPSO) Kikeh and the Kikeh Spar for the Kikeh field in September 2006, Malaysia's first deepwater project. FPSO Kikeh was the first deepwater FPSO in Malaysia and the Spar platform was the first to be installed outside of the Gulf of Mexico.

Another milestone was achieved in 2007 when the MHB Group ventured abroad to operate and manage the Kiyanly yard, the only fabrication yard in Turkmenistan, on behalf of PETRONAS Carigali (Turkmenistan) Sdn Bhd.

The most recent significant achievement was the completion of the Gumusut-Kakap semi-floating production system (FPS). It is the largest such facility in the world to have been fully built and integrated on land. The FPS left the MMHE West yard in Pasir Gudang, Johor on 13 May 2013. MMHE East and MMHE West are the only fabrication yards in South-east Asia to have constructed deepwater facilities in Malaysia for its international oil and gas clients.

In April 2012, through the yard optimisation initiative, MHB expanded its yard size and capacity with the acquisition of new land for the fabrication of offshore oil and gas related structures, to cater to EPCIC works. The acquisition has significantly increased MHB's Pasir Gudang yard capacity from 69,700 MT to 129,700 MT, making MHB the largest fabricator in Malaysia today in terms of yard size and capacity. In conjunction with the acquisition, MMHE's yard in Jalan Pekeliling was renamed “MMHE West”, while the newly acquired yard is now known as “MMHE East”. There are approximately 4,000 operations and services support staff working at both yards in Pasir Gudang as well as in the Group Corporate Office in Menara Dayabumi, Kuala Lumpur on any given day.

Today, MHB is recognised as a regional heavy engineering and deepwater support services provider for the oil and gas deepwater industry as well as a key player for LNG ship repair and dry docking. MHB is also a one-stop centre for marine conversion.

Through partnerships with Samsung Heavy Industries of South Korea, Technip S.A. of France and ATB Riva of Italy, all of whom are leaders in their respective fields, MHB have improved their offerings through the enhancement of capabilities and the transfer of technology.

== Core businesses ==
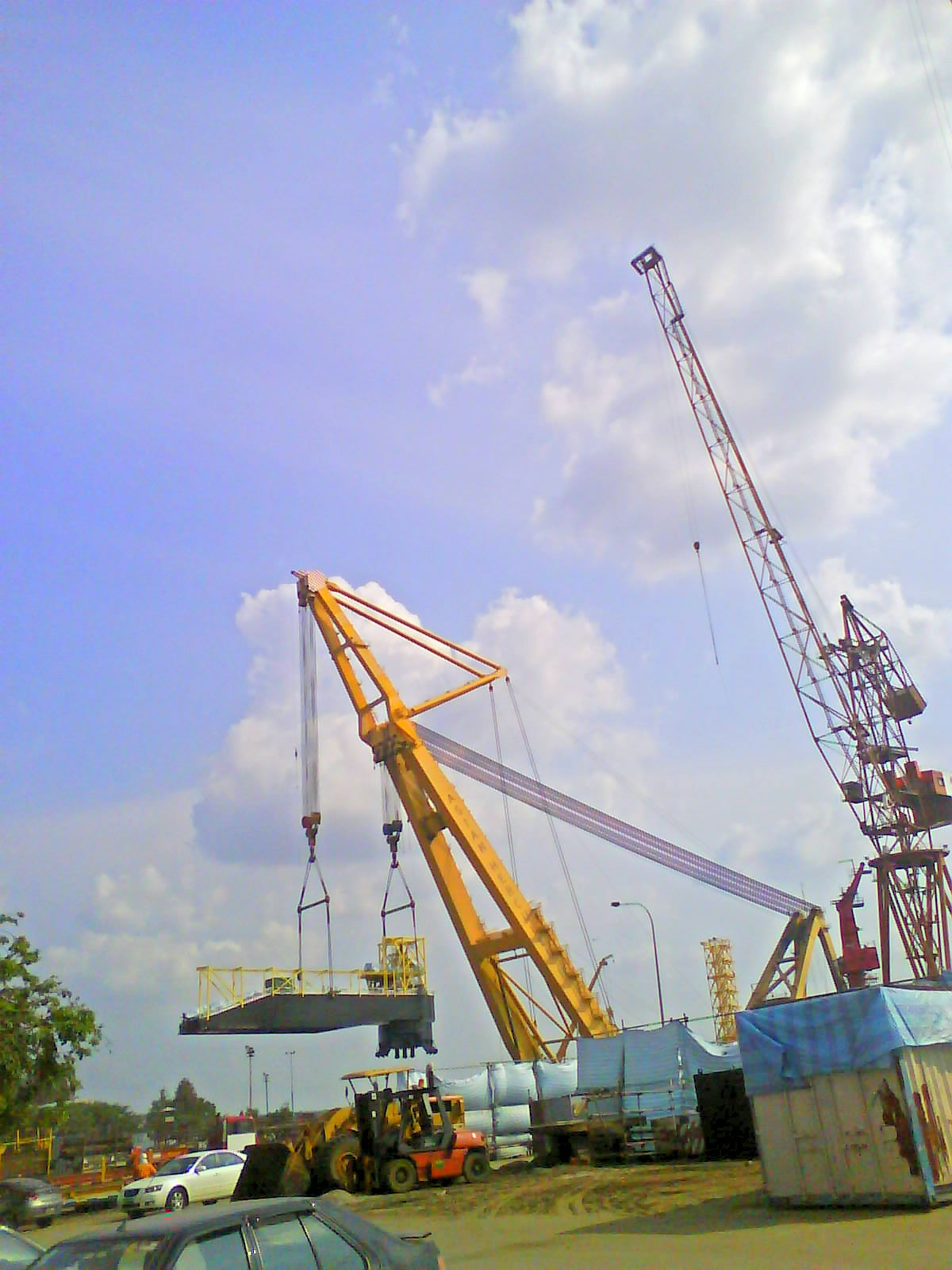
Asian Hercules crane on duty

=== Offshore construction ===
MHB offers a full range of construction and engineering services for the offshore and onshore oil and gas industry, from detailed engineering design and procurement to construction, installation, hook-up and commissioning (EPCIC). Projects include the construction of production topsides, process modules, turrets, floating production systems, mooring buoy systems and mobile offshore storage units.

=== Offshore conversion ===
MHB is a one-stop centre for converting vessels such as VLCCs, Aframax tankers, offshore oil rigs and LNG carriers into floating structures i.e.: floating production, storage and offloading units (FPSOs), floating storage and offloading units (FSOs), MOPUs, MODUs and floating storage units (FSUs). Its comprehensive offshore conversion services range from engineering design to fabrication, installation and commissioning of these structures. The MMHE's West yard is the only yard in Malaysia that has completed FPSO and FSO conversion projects.

=== Marine repair ===
MHB has built upon its core capabilities in general vessel repairs to focus on more complex and higher value repair and refurbishment projects such as those for LNG carriers and offshore oil rigs. Its marine repair services include repair, refit and refurbishment of a wide range of vessels, with a focus on energy-related vessels such as ULCCs, VLCCs, petroleum tankers, chemical tankers, offshore oil rigs, gas carriers and other offshore support vessels. Other services include the construction of new built structures such as tender barges, and ‘jumboisation’ works, which are complex engineering operations to increase the size of a vessel.

== Locations ==
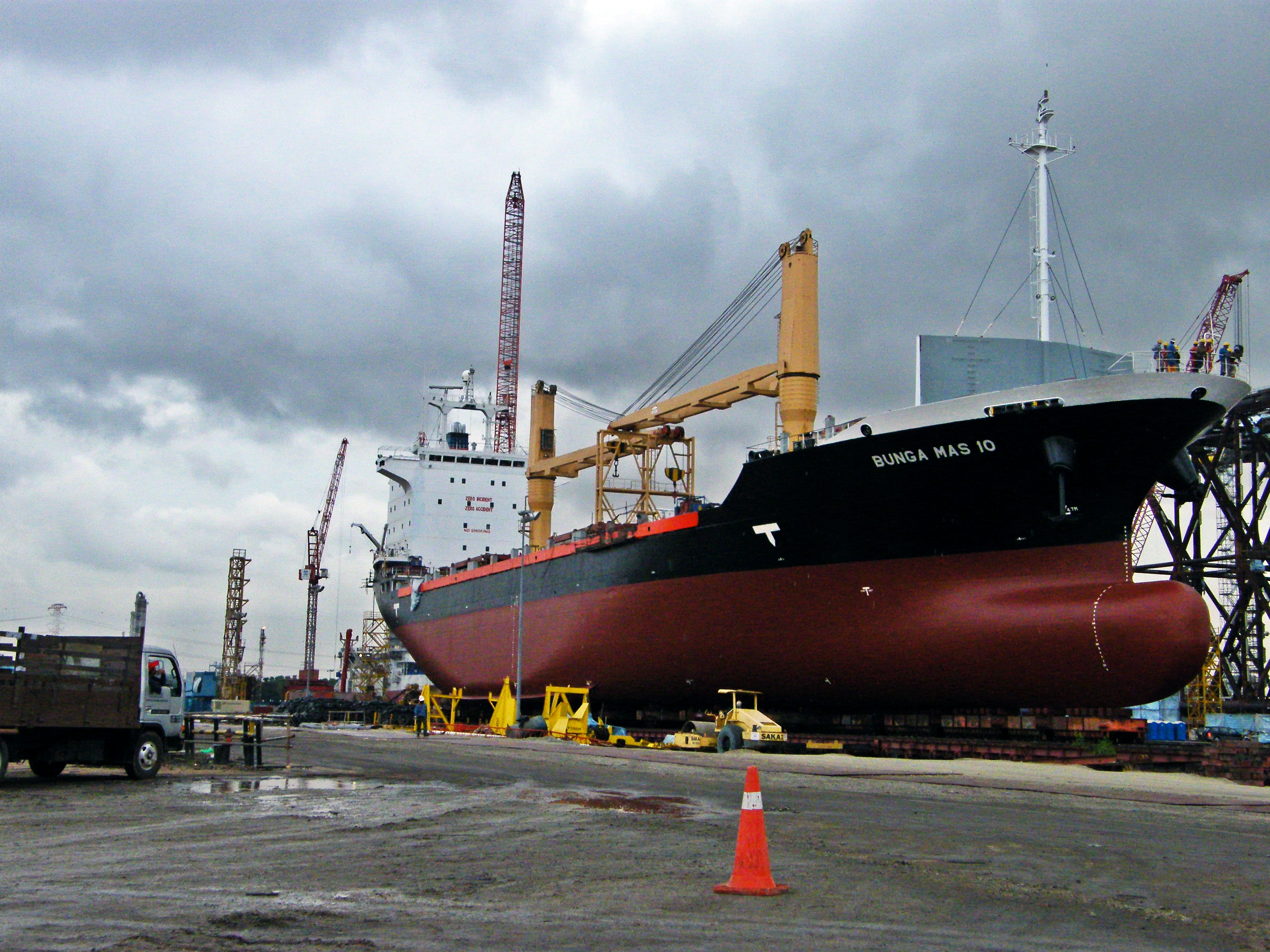
Bunga Mas 10 at MMHE yard

=== MMHE West Yard ===
The MMHE West yard is the single largest fabrication yard by annual tonnage capacity in Malaysia. It also boasts one of the largest dry docks in South East Asia. It is located at Pasir Gudang, Johor.

- The only yard in Malaysia that has constructed deepwater structures for the oil and gas industry.
- The only yard in Malaysia that has completed FPSO/FSO conversions, the first being the FPSO Perintis completed in March 1999.
- Pioneered the construction of Malaysia's first deepwater project namely the FPSO Kikeh, which boasts the biggest and heaviest external turret on any FPSO worldwide.
- Constructed the Gumusut-Kakap semi-floating production system (FPS), the largest of such facilities in the world to have been fully built and integrated on land.
- Total Area : 150.6-hectare (372 acres) complex with 1.8 km seafront
- Capacities : Ability to construct large marine structures with a total tonnage of 69,700 MT per year

=== MMHE East Yard ===
MHB started to operate in MMHE East yard in April 2012 following the acquisition of the yard. It is the smaller of the two yards operated by MHB.

Total area: 46.8-hectare (116 acres) complex with 500 metres seafront Capacities: Ability to construct large marine structures with a total tonnage of 60,000 MT per year Fabrication area: 3 fabrication and assembly areas totalling 200,700 m^{2}

== See also ==
- Boustead Heavy Industries Corporation
- ST Marine
- PT PAL
