= Foreign relations of Djibouti =

Foreign relations of Djibouti are managed by the Djiboutian Ministry of Foreign Affairs and International Cooperation. Djibouti maintains close ties with the governments of Somalia, Ethiopia, France and the United States. It is likewise an active participant in African Union, United Nations, Non-Aligned Movement, Organisation of Islamic Cooperation and Arab League affairs.

Djibouti has been a member of the Forum of Small States (FOSS) since the group's founding in 1992.

== Diplomatic relations ==
List of countries which Djibouti maintains diplomatic relations with:

| # | Country | Date |
|---|---|---|
| 1 | France | 27 June 1977 |
| 2 | Pakistan | 27 June 1977 |
| 3 | United States | 27 June 1977 |
| 4 | Hungary | 28 June 1977 |
| 5 | Syria | June 1977 |
| 6 | Egypt | 22 July 1977 |
| 7 | Oman | 16 November 1977 |
| 8 | Saudi Arabia | 7 December 1977 |
| 9 | South Korea | 7 December 1977 |
| 10 | Czech Republic | 8 December 1977 |
| 11 | Tunisia | 1977 |
| 12 | Cameroon | 22 January 1978 |
| 13 | Germany | 23 January 1978 |
| 14 | Sudan | 25 January 1978 |
| 15 | United Kingdom | 25 January 1978 |
| 16 | Iraq | 11 March 1978 |
| 17 | Morocco | 14 March 1978 |
| 18 | Senegal | 24 March 1978 |
| 19 | Russia | 3 April 1978 |
| 20 | Iran | 4 April 1978 |
| 21 | Canada | 13 June 1978 |
| — | State of Palestine | 13 June 1978 |
| 22 | Romania | 18 June 1978 |
| 23 | Belgium | 19 June 1978 |
| 24 | Serbia | 11 July 1978 |
| 25 | Libya | 24 July 1978 |
| 26 | Guinea | 7 August 1978 |
| 27 | Japan | 24 August 1978 |
| 28 | Algeria | 10 October 1978 |
| 29 | China | 8 January 1979 |
| 30 | Somalia | 4 June 1979 |
| 31 | Spain | 25 June 1979 |
| 32 | Turkey | 25 June 1979 |
| 33 | Indonesia | 6 September 1979 |
| 34 | Ethiopia | 15 December 1979 |
| 35 | India | 24 December 1979 |
| 36 | Sweden | 20 February 1980 |
| 37 | Poland | 24 February 1980 |
| 38 | Yemen | 13 March 1980 |
| 39 | Albania | 2 April 1980 |
| 40 | Rwanda | 3 April 1980 |
| 41 | Italy | 19 June 1980 |
| 42 | Tanzania | 3 December 1980 |
| 43 | Netherlands | 10 February 1981 |
| 44 | Lebanon | 11 March 1981 |
| 45 | United Arab Emirates | 26 December 1981 |
| 46 | Kuwait | 31 October 1982 |
| 47 | Switzerland | 23 December 1982 |
| 48 | Austria | 18 January 1983 |
| 49 | Bahrain | 6 February 1983 |
| 50 | Singapore | 15 September 1983 |
| 51 | Bangladesh | 25 September 1983 |
| 52 | Kenya | 13 March 1984 |
| 53 | Comoros | 29 March 1984 |
| 54 | Jordan | 3 April 1984 |
| 55 | Burundi | 13 December 1984 |
| 56 | Republic of the Congo | February 1985 |
| 57 | Greece | 21 October 1985 |
| 58 | Thailand | 1 April 1986 |
| 59 | Uganda | 20 January 1988 |
| 60 | Mexico | 22 June 1989 |
| 61 | Nigeria | 12 July 1989 |
| 62 | Vietnam | 30 April 1991 |
| 63 | Seychelles | 3 February 1993 |
| 64 | North Korea | 13 June 1993 |
| 65 | Eritrea | 11 July 1993 |
| 66 | Argentina | 27 August 1993 |
| 67 | Norway | 20 January 1995 |
| 68 | South Africa | 7 February 1996 |
| 69 | Portugal | 29 March 1996 |
| 70 | Azerbaijan | 22 October 1996 |
| 71 | Brazil | 22 October 1996 |
| 72 | North Macedonia | 12 June 1997 |
| 73 | Philippines | 16 February 1998 |
| 74 | Malaysia | 3 August 1998 |
| 75 | Colombia | 30 September 1998 |
| 76 | Cuba | 20 November 1998 |
| 77 | Lithuania | 9 June 1999 |
| 78 | Madagascar | 13 August 1999 |
| — | Holy See | 20 May 2000 |
| 79 | Georgia | 22 November 2000 |
| 80 | Slovakia | 22 November 2000 |
| 81 | Luxembourg | 14 June 2001 |
| 82 | Ireland | 6 July 2001 |
| 83 | Denmark | 10 December 2002 |
| 84 | Estonia | 16 June 2005 |
| 85 | Iceland | 19 July 2005 |
| 86 | Venezuela | 8 October 2005 |
| 87 | Zambia | 11 December 2006 |
| 88 | Slovenia | 14 December 2006 |
| 89 | Chad | 8 January 2007 |
| 90 | Bulgaria | 13 February 2007 |
| 91 | Botswana | 14 March 2007 |
| 92 | Finland | 14 March 2007 |
| 93 | Democratic Republic of the Congo | 26 March 2007 |
| 94 | Uruguay | 12 February 2008 |
| 95 | Maldives | 7 April 2008 |
| 96 | Benin | 16 June 2008 |
| 97 | Saint Vincent and the Grenadines | 7 August 2008 |
| 98 | Andorra | 17 March 2009 |
| 99 | Bosnia and Herzegovina | 17 March 2009 |
| 100 | Ukraine | 17 March 2009 |
| 101 | Niger | 20 April 2009 |
| 102 | Australia | 23 April 2009 |
| 103 | Panama | 15 December 2009 |
| 104 | Kazakhstan | 5 May 2010 |
| 105 | Paraguay | 22 July 2010 |
| 106 | Fiji | 16 September 2010 |
| 107 | Chile | 22 January 2011 |
| 108 | Dominican Republic | 8 March 2011 |
| 109 | Montenegro | 6 October 2011 |
| 110 | Monaco | 1 December 2011 |
| 111 | South Sudan | 11 February 2012 |
| 112 | Ghana | 12 March 2012 |
| 113 | Latvia | 30 March 2012 |
| 114 | Brunei | 9 November 2012 |
| 115 | Mali | 12 November 2012 |
| — | Kosovo | 19 May 2013 |
| 116 | Belarus | 26 August 2013 |
| 117 | Burkina Faso | 16 December 2013 |
| 118 | Kyrgyzstan | 3 June 2015 |
| 119 | Sri Lanka | 16 November 2015 |
| 120 | Ecuador | 20 November 2015 |
| 121 | Mongolia | 20 January 2016 |
| 122 | Togo | 14 February 2016 |
| 123 | Cambodia | 28 April 2016 |
| 124 | Ivory Coast | 28 April 2016 |
| 125 | New Zealand | 1 October 2016 |
| 126 | Mauritius | 12 December 2016 |
| 127 | Mauritania | 15 February 2017 |
| 128 | Tajikistan | 17 March 2017 |
| 129 | Namibia | 15 May 2017 |
| 130 | Croatia | 22 May 2017 |
| 131 | Turkmenistan | 4 July 2017 |
| 132 | Nepal | 14 July 2017 |
| 133 | Dominica | 9 January 2018 |
| 134 | Guatemala | 28 February 2018 |
| 135 | Peru | 28 February 2018 |
| 136 | Malta | 26 June 2018 |
| 137 | Equatorial Guinea | 9 October 2018 |
| 138 | Armenia | 22 May 2019 |
| 139 | Nicaragua | 9 September 2019 |
| 140 | Saint Kitts and Nevis | 20 February 2020 |
| 141 | Suriname | 21 February 2020 |
| 142 | Moldova | 9 October 2020 |
| 143 | Gambia | 1 July 2021 |
| 144 | Angola | 24 January 2022 |
| 145 | Uzbekistan | 2 May 2024 |
| 146 | El Salvador | 6 December 2024 |
| 147 | Zimbabwe | 20 January 2025 |
| 148 | Central African Republic | 18 March 2025 |
| 149 | Bahamas | 23 September 2025 |
| 150 | Trinidad and Tobago | 25 March 2026 |
| 151 | Eswatini | 17 June 2026 |
| 152 | Gabon | 24 June 2026 |
| 153 | Qatar | Unknown |

== Bilateral relations ==
=== Africa ===
| Country | Formal Relations Began | Notes |
|---|---|---|
| Eritrea | 11 July 1993 | See Djibouti–Eritrea relations: Djibouti has an embassy in Asmara.; Eritrea has an embassy in Djibouti City. |
| Ethiopia | 15 December 1979 | See Djibouti–Ethiopia relations Both countries established diplomatic relations on 15 December 1979.: Djibouti has an embassy in Addis Ababa.; Ethiopia has an embassy in Djibouti City. |
| Kenya | 13 March 1984 | See Djibouti–Kenya relations Both countries established diplomatic relations on 13 March 1984.: Djibouti has an embassy in Nairobi.; Kenya has an embassy in Djibouti City. |
| Morocco | 14 March 1978 | Both countries established diplomatic relations on 14 March 1978: Djibouti has an embassy in Rabat.; Morocco has a consulate in Djibouti City. |
| Somalia | 4 June 1979 | See Djibouti–Somalia relations Both countries established diplomatic relations on 4 June 1979.: Djibouti has an embassy in Mogadishu.; Somalia has an embassy in Djibouti City. |

=== Americas ===
| Country | Formal Relations Began | Notes |
|---|---|---|
| Brazil | 22 October 1996 | Both countries established diplomatic relations on 22 October 1996: Brazil and Djibouti established diplomatic relations in 1996. In 2012, an Agreement on Technical Cooperation between the two countries was signed cooperation focus on areas of infrastructure, agriculture, environment, health, education, national solidarity, scientific research, and social development. A Brazilian company was building a port in the Djibouti funding from the United Arab Emirates. |
| Canada | 13 June 1978 | Both countries established diplomatic relations on 13 June 1978 when the first Ambassador of Canada to Djibouti presented his credentials. Canada also has an Honorary Consul in Djibouti City. Both Montreal and Ottawa are home to organized Djiboutian diaspora communities, and there is an active community of returned Djiboutian-Canadians in Djibouti. |
| Cuba | 20 November 1998 | Both countries established diplomatic relations on 20 November 1998: Djibouti has an embassy in Havana.; Cuba has a consulate in Djibouti City. |
| Mexico | 22 June 1989 | Both countries established diplomatic relations on 22 June 1989: Djibouti is accredited to Mexico from its embassy in Havana, Cuba.; Mexico is accredited to Djibouti from its embassy in Addis Ababa, Ethiopia and maintains an honorary consulate in Djibouti City. |
| United States | 27 June 1977 | See Djibouti-United States relations Both countries established diplomatic relations on 27 June 1977.: Djibouti is a strategic partner of the United States in the Global War on Terrorism.; Djibouti has an embassy in Washington, D.C. and a consulate-general in New York City.; United States has an embassy in Djibouti City. |

=== Asia ===
| Country | Formal Relations Began | Notes |
|---|---|---|
| Azerbaijan | 22 October 1996 | See Azerbaijan–Djibouti relations: Diplomatic relations between Azerbaijan and Djibouti were established on 22 October 1996. |
| China | 8 January 1979 | See China–Djibouti relations: Djibouti has an embassy in Beijing.; China has an embassy in Djibouti City. |
| India | 7 December 1981 | See Djibouti–India relations Both countries established diplomatic relations on 7 December 1981: Djibouti has an embassy in New Delhi.; India has an embassy in Djibouti City. |
| Indonesia | 1979 | Both countries established diplomatic relations in 1979, Djibouti is represented in Indonesia through its embassy in Tokyo, Japan. Indonesia is accredited to Djibouti through its embassy in Addis Ababa. |
| Iran | 1978 | In July 1998, Iran and Djibouti signed a letter of understanding to consolidate their political, economic, trade, and industrial ties, but in January 2016 Djibouti cut off all diplomatic relations with Iran due to tensions between Saudi Arabia and Iran. The two countries restored diplomatic ties on 22 September 2023. |
| Japan | 24 August 1978 | See Djibouti–Japan relations Both countries established diplomatic relations on 24 August 1978.: Djibouti has an embassy in Tokyo.; Japan has an embassy in Djibouti City.; Japan's Maritime Self-Defense Force(MSDF) maintains an overseas military base in Djibouti since 2011. Japanese forces in Djibouti is tasked to escort ships and combat piracy on the Gulf of Aden and Red Sea. |
| Kuwait | 31 October 1982 | Both countries established diplomatic relations on 31 October 1982: Djibouti has an embassy in Kuwait City.; Kuwait has a consulate in Djibouti City. |
| Philippines | 26 February 1998 | Both countries established diplomatic relations on 26 February 1998: Djibouti is accredited to the Philippines from its embassy in Tokyo, Japan. |
| Qatar | | Djibouti has an embassy in Doha.; Qatar has an embassy in Djibouti City. |
| Saudi Arabia | 7 December 1977 | Both countries established diplomatic relations on 7 December 1977: Djibouti has an embassy in Riyadh.; Saudi Arabia has an embassy in Djibouti City. |
| Singapore | 15 September 1983 | Both countries established diplomatic relations on 15 September 1983. Djibouti is accredited to Singapore from its embassy in Tokyo, Japan. |
| South Korea | 7 December 1977 | Both countries established diplomatic relations on 7 December 1977: Bilateral trade in 2011 amounted to $47,390,000 in exports, and $9,000 in imports. |
| Turkey | 25 June 1979 | See also Djibouti–Turkey relations: Djibouti has an embassy in Ankara.; Turkey has an embassy in Djibouti City.; Trade volume between the two countries was US$252 million in 2019. |
| Uzbekistan | | Djibouti recognized the independence of Uzbekistan on 6 January 1992. However both countries have not yet established diplomatic relations. |
| Vietnam | 30 April 1991 | Both countries established diplomatic relations on 30 April 1991.; Both countries are full members of Organisation internationale de la Francophonie. |
| Yemen | 13 March 1980 | See Djibouti - Yemen relations Both countries established diplomatic relations on 13 March 1980. Relations between Yemen and Djibouti are good, and cooperation takes place on many levels. A causeway between the two countries has been proposed.: Djibouti has an embassy in Sana'a.; Yemen has an embassy in Djibouti City. |

=== Europe ===
| Country | Formal Relations Began | Notes |
|---|---|---|
| Denmark | | Denmark is accredited to Djibouti from its embassy in Addis Ababa, Ethiopia.; Djibouti is accredited to Denmark from its embassy in Brussels, Belgium. |
| Finland | 14 March 2007 | Both countries established diplomatic relations on 14 March 2007: Finland is accredited to Djibouti from its embassy in Addis Ababa, Ethiopia.; Djibouti is accredited to Finland from its embassy in Moscow, Russia. |
| France | 6 July 1977 | See Djibouti–France relations Both countries established diplomatic relations on 6 July 1977.: Djibouti has an embassy in Paris.; France has an embassy in Djibouti City. |
| Germany | 23 January 1978 | Both countries established diplomatic relations on 23 January 1978: Djibouti has an embassy in Berlin.; Germany has an embassy in Djibouti City. |
| Greece | 1981 | Greece has an honorary consulate in Djibouti City.; Greek-Djiboutian relations are particularly friendly. The Greek community in Djibouti has significantly contributed to that. |
| Iceland | 19 July 2005 | Both countries established diplomatic relations on 19 July 2005: Iceland is accredit to Djibouti from its embassy in Kampala, Uganda. |
| Ireland | 6 July 2001 | Both countries established diplomatic relations on 6 July 2001: Ireland is accredit to Djibouti from its embassy in Addis Ababa, Ethiopia. |
| Kosovo | 22 March 2013 | Djibouti officially recognised the independence of the Republic of Kosovo on 8 May 2010. On 22 March 2013 Djibouti and Kosovo established diplomatic relations and vowed to strengthen bilateral co-operation with one another. |
| Romania | 18 May 1978 | Both countries established diplomatic relations on 18 May 1978.; Both countries are full members of Organisation internationale de la Francophonie. |
| Russia | 3 April 1978 | See Djibouti–Russia relations Both countries established diplomatic relations on 3 April 1978: Djibouti has an embassy in Moscow.; Russia has an embassy in Djibouti City. |
| Serbia | 11 July 1978 | Both countries established diplomatic relations on 11 July 1978: Serbia has an honorary consulate in Djibouti City. |
| Spain | 25 June 1979 | * Djibouti is accredited to Spain from its embassy in Paris, France.: Spain is accredited to Djibouti from its embassy in Addis Ababa, Ethiopia. |
| Sweden | 20 February 1980 | Both countries established diplomatic relations on 20 February 1980, when first ambassador of Sweden to Djibouti Arne Helleryd presented his credentials to President of Djibouti Hassan Gouled Aptidon: Djibouti is accredited to Sweden from its embassy in Brussels, Belgium.; Sweden is accredited to Djibouti from its embassy in Addis Ababa, Ethiopia. |
| Switzerland | 23 December 1982 | Both countries established diplomatic relations on 23 December 1982: Djibouti has an embassy in Geneva.; Switzerland has an honorary consulate in Djibouti City. |
| United Kingdom | 25 January 1978 | Both countries established diplomatic relations on 25 January 1978, when first Ambassador of the United Kingdom to Djibouti Mr. Benjamin Strachan presented his letters of credentials to President of Djibouti Hassan Gouled Aptidon |

=== Oceania ===
| Country | Formal Relations Began | Notes |
|---|---|---|
| Australia | | Djibouti is accredited to Australia through its embassy in Tokyo, Japan. |
| New Zealand | | Djibouti is accredited to New Zealand from its embassy in Tokyo, Japan. |

== International organisations ==
Djibouti is a member of the African Union, Arab League, La Francophonie, Port Management Association of Eastern and Southern Africa, and the United Nations.

In 1996, the Intergovernmental Authority on Development (IGAD), a developmental organisation of seven countries in East Africa, established its headquarters in Djibouti City. IGAD's mandate is for regional cooperation and economic integration.

After the terror attacks of 11 September 2001, Djibouti joined the Global War on Terror. It is now home to the Camp Lemonnier military compound.

Djibouti is also a member of the International Criminal Court with a Bilateral Immunity Agreement of protection for the US-military (as covered under Article 98).

== See also ==
- List of diplomatic missions in Djibouti
- List of diplomatic missions of Djibouti
- Ministry of Foreign Affairs and International Cooperation (Djibouti)
