= Foreign policy of Meles Zenawi =

Overview of foreign affairs dominated by Ethiopian Prime Minister Meles Zenawi

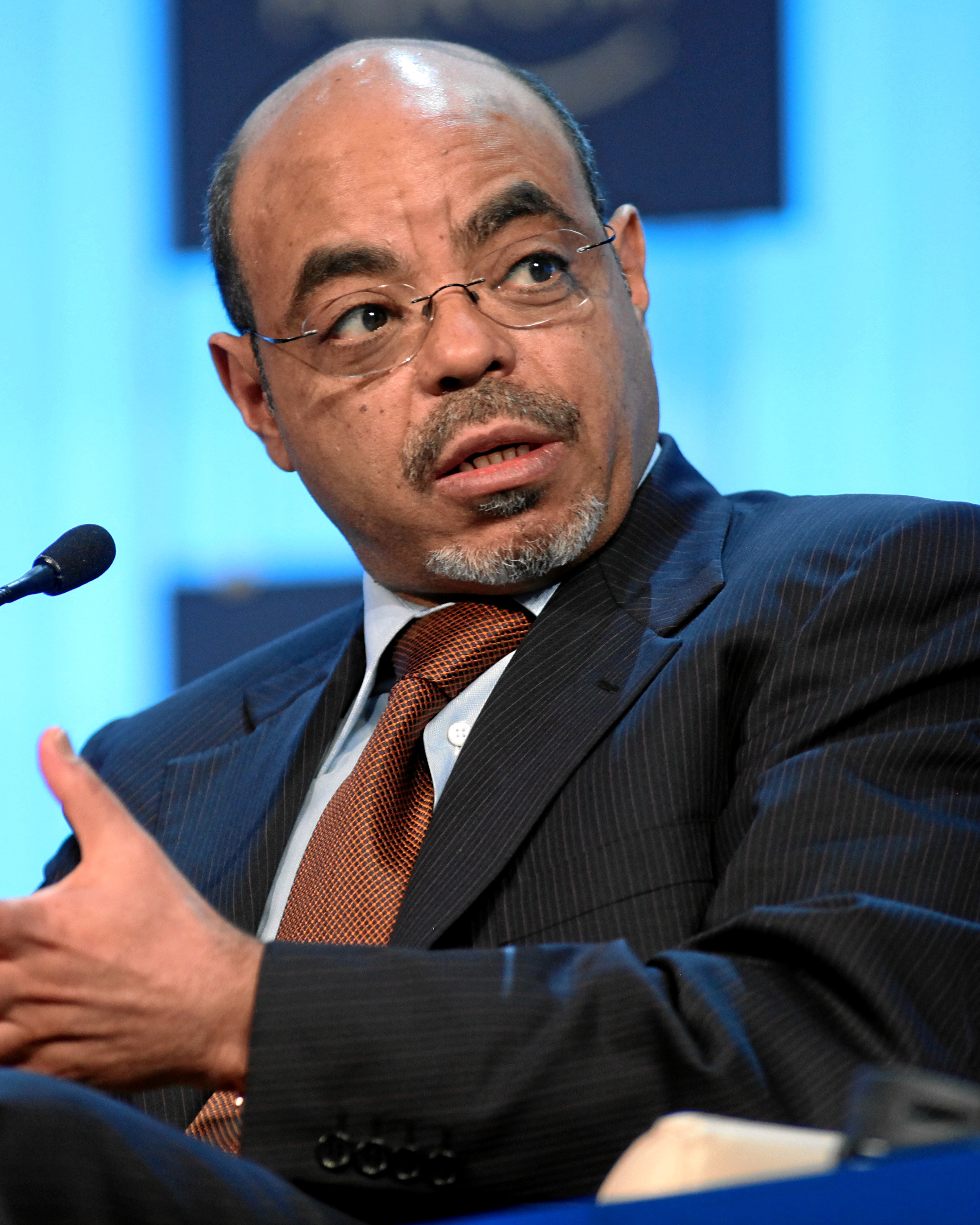
Meles Zenawi at World Economic Forum Annual Meeting 2012

The following events detail foreign affairs dominated by Ethiopian Prime Minister Meles Zenawi from his presidency until his death in 2012.

== Eritrea ==
Meles relations with Eritrea were in good terms as the Tigray People's Liberation Front (TPLF) helped the Eritrean People's Liberation Front (EPLF) to overthrow the Derg. During the Transitional Government, Meles helped Eritrea to secede with referendum resulted in 99.83% in favor, with a 98.5% turnout. The independence was declared on 27 April 1993. This was the first time of Eritrea since War on Independence in 1961. On 28 May, Eritrea was admitted to the United Nations.

The relationship between EPLF and TPLF fluctuated in some degree, especially during the Ethiopian Civil War. By 1980s and 1990s, TPLF gained weighted power in military but were its varied ideology gradually defected from EPLF by 1985. In 1998, the disputed Badme territory between these two countries boundary aggravated the relations and culminated in the Eritrean–Ethiopian War, which killed ten thousand people. In December 2000, Ethiopia and Eritrea signed Algiers Agreement which finalize the war and created a pair of binding judicial commissions, the Eritrea–Ethiopia Border Commission and the Eritrean–Ethiopian Claims Commissions, to oversee the disputed border and related claims. While Ethiopia rejected demarcation of border, Eritrea wanted to demarcate in accordance with the commission. Since then, there was elevated tensions with border conflict and stalemate what is described "war footing" and "no-war-no-peace" with absence of foreign and domestic policy domination.

Eritrea tends to support Ethiopian opposition groups like the Ogaden National Liberation Front (ONLF) and the Oromo Liberation Front (OLF) to undermine Ethiopia's influence in the disputed region. This has been marked by Eritrean training and finance provision to the armed militias. The UN Monitoring Group on Somalia reported an embargo in Eritrea, along with Ethiopia and other states, on Somalia. In late 2008, the Ethiopian Border Commission (EEBC) without delimitation of the border in November 2007, the United Nations Missions in Ethiopia and Eritrea (UNMEE) terminated its mandate in 2008, and Eritrea seized the Temporary Security Zone. Ethiopia remained in control of EEBC's demarcation border in the Eritrean territory side advancing through Badme, which resulted mass mobilization and high concentration of troops in the area.

== Egypt ==
In May 2010, Ethiopia with five African countries signed the Nile Basin Initiative: Tanzania, Uganda, Kenya, Rwanda and Burundi despite Egypt and Sudan objected as a breach of the 1929 treaty. In the same month, Meles told to Egyptian delegation that he would freeze consideration of the colonial era treaty, which gives 90% of Nile water to both countries. In November 2010, Meles said in an interview "Egypt could not win a war with Ethiopia over the River Nile and is also supporting rebel groups in an attempt to destabilize the Horn of Africa nation." Egypt called it a "national security" issue. Meles claimed that Egypt supported rebel groups in Ethiopia and Egyptian President Hosni Mubarak dismissed the allegation.

The Grand Ethiopian Renaissance Dam project inaugurated on 2 April 2011, expecting to produce 15,000 megawatts of power within 10 years, spending 12 billion dollars of strategy to improve power generating capabilities. Meles told at press conference "We are planning to carry out a number of important projects, including a major project on the Nile." Egypt worried the dam would affect water levels in river shared by a number of countries, which preferred negotiations with Ethiopia. In September 2011, Meles visited Egypt to discuss the sharing of water from the Nile river with head of ruling military council, Hussein Tantawi, Prime Minister Essam Sharaf and Foreign Minister Mohamed Kamel Amr. He claimed that GERD could bring agreement about equitable use of the Nile as the project reduce evaporation, regulate water flow, and provide cheap energy to downstream countries. Meles assured that "the benefits that will accrue from the dam will by no means be restricted to Ethiopia."

== Djibouti ==
Ethiopia and Djibouti relations were reconstructed after the Eritrean–Ethiopian War that left Ethiopia without accessing direct sea basin. Today, Ethiopia has 90% imports arrived from Port of Djibouti and 95% of Djiboutian regional exports. On 1 November 1999, Djiboutian President Ismail Omar Guelleh met with Ethiopian President Negasso Gidada and later Meles in Addis Ababa to discuss for bilateral and regional relations. During his state visit, Guelleh signed accords covering the use of Port of Djibouti by landlocked Ethiopia, as well as on trade, customs, investment and transport. Guelleh also headed to Tigray Region for talks with Tigrayan authorities and visited Negash Mosque, being the first African leader to visit the mosque.

Similarly, on 2 June 2001, Meles met with President Guelleh in Nairobi to discuss the issues, which has been said "fruitful." Ethiopian radio quoted Guelleh speech that the agreement strengthen "the brotherly relations" between the two countries.

== Somalia ==
When the Ethiopian People's Revolutionary Democratic Front (EPRDF) came to power in 1991, the Somali government collapsed in the same year. According to former senior Somali government official told IRIN, Meles lived in Mogadishu while he was leader in 1980s, together with Isaias Afwerki "in a villa behind Tawfiq Hotel, north Mogadishu, and were handled by the National Security Service."

By early phase, Somali militias wanted to use Meles as broker for peace talks and considered him revolutionary leader in the "new generation" of African leaders. Thus, in 1992, Ethiopia gained international praise for bring Somali factions together in Addis Ababa for peace talks. By 1993, many of these factions claimed that Ethiopia was forcibly use for pursuing its own agenda. The new government has increasingly influenced by Somali Region, which by this time had political link with Somalia.

The EPRDF found it difficult to establish itself in the Somali Region, which remained unstable area in the country. By introducing ethnic nationalism, the central government of Ethiopia found itself struggling to establish "obidient" Somali party. On other side, the Ogaden National Liberation Front (ONLF) turmoil the regional independence, while Islamic extremist group Al-Ittihad believed comprises about 50% of Muslim and 50% Christian, although the Ethiopian officials told to IRIN the ratio was 60% Christian to 40% Muslim.

Although Somali population is relatively small consisted of around 3.5 million, the Somali Region encompasses the larger portion of the area, bordered by Somalia and frequently under control of armed opposition groups like Oromo Liberation Front (OLF) and ONLF. The Somali Region problem was exacerbated by the collapse of the Somali government, leading to of hundreds of thousands refugees and returnees cross the border because of the Somali Civil War. Ethiopian foreign policy increasingly directed toward the threatening of "Islamic fundamentalism". In December 2000, Meles told an interviewer "What concerns us first and last is what the government [of Somalia] and the different parties and organisations do inside Ethiopia. Some of the extremist organisations did not limit their activities inside Somalia and went to destabilise Ethiopia.” In the interview, published in the Arabic London-based ‘Al-Hayat’ newspaper, Meles said of the situation in Somalia: “What worries us is the presence of well-trained terrorists, and that is enough to destabilise the security and stability of Ethiopia."

By the time of new Somali government was elected during Djibouti hosted peace talks in August 2000, Ethiopia firmly committed to certain Somali leaders and territories. In 2006, the Islamic Courts Union (ICU) virtually controlled the whole of southern Somalia and successfully united Mogadishu and imposed Shari'a law.

The Transitional Federal Government (TFG) sought to reestablish authority in cooperation with Ethiopian troops, African Union peacekeeper and air support by the United States to drive out the rival ICU and solidify the rule. Thus, resulted the eventual ICU's split and formation of several factions with some have radical elements, including Al-Shabaab, regrouped to continue the insurgency against TFG and Ethiopian military presence in Somalia. Ethiopia was accused of backing rival Somali warlords in order to keep the country weak. In October 2011, a coordinated multinational operation began against Al-Shabaab in southern Somalia, with Ethiopian military joining the following month.

== Sudan ==
Sudan–Ethiopia relations had worsened following assassination attempt of Egyptian President Hosni Mubarak in Addis Ababa in June 1995, where Meles alleged that Sudan plotted the assassination. In April 1996, Meles accused Khartoum of destabilizing the region and the Sudanese army was incapable of engaging in a large-scale conflict with its neighbors. On 12 June 1996, Meles said to Sudanese government "despite its worsening relations with the Islamic government in Sudan, Ethiopia will not allow its territory to be used by Sudanese rebels." He denied the Sudan's allegation of the main anti-Khartoum rebel groups Sudan People's Liberation Army (SPLA) were operating inside Ethiopia.

On 18–19 November 1999, Sudanese President Omar al-Bashir visited Ethiopia accompanied by high-ranking government officials and received by Ethiopian President Negasso Gidada on discussion of bilateral and regional issues of common interests. The discussion said to be cordial and characterized the historical bond relationship.

Meles worked in negotiation between Sudan and South Sudan on details of their split and largely used as neutral broker in their relations. This was aggravated after his death in 2012. In September 2011, Meles dismissed an allegation in leaked diplomatic cables quoting Meles' desire to topple the Sudanese President al-Bashir.

== Climate change ==
Meles played frontal role in engaging with UN's climate change policy since 2009, and his role as chair of the meeting of the Committee of African Heads of State and Government on Climate Change. He was known for voicing climate change in Africa and clear example of his legacy in advocating Pan-Africanism through intergovernmental processes and dialogue.

Under his leadership, Ethiopia developed a comprehensive Climate Resilient and Green Economy (CRGE) Strategy, which has the goal of transforming the country into carbon-neutral middle income country by 2025. Meles initiated UNEP's Billion Tree Campaign, planting total of 1.7 billion trees since early 2007. Ethiopia was the third largest behind India and China.

On 31 August 2009, Meles was appointed Chair of the African Heads of State and Government on Climate Change (CAHOSCC). The head of the African groups of nations at the UN climate change conference in Copenhagen has adapted financial deal that able the rich countries to pay poor states to conserve climate change and develop their economies using clean technology. From the proposal, Meles' deal of 50 billion dollars per year for poor countries by 2015 and 100 billion dollars by 2020, is far less than many developing nations had been calling for, but is roughly in line with a proposal in June by the UK Prime Minister Gordon Brown, and an offer agreed by the EU in October.

== Intergovernmental organizations ==
In 2005 general election, Meles slammed the European Union report on the election, calling it "trash." He described the EU Election Observer Mission report as "useless trash that deserves to be thrown in the garbage." The final EU report, released in Brussels on May 16, criticized the irregularities of the 23 May election. Among other things, it charged the ruling party use of state resources for campaign, in significant number of polling stations, final vote counts were different from those recorded by observers.
