= Latyr Sy =

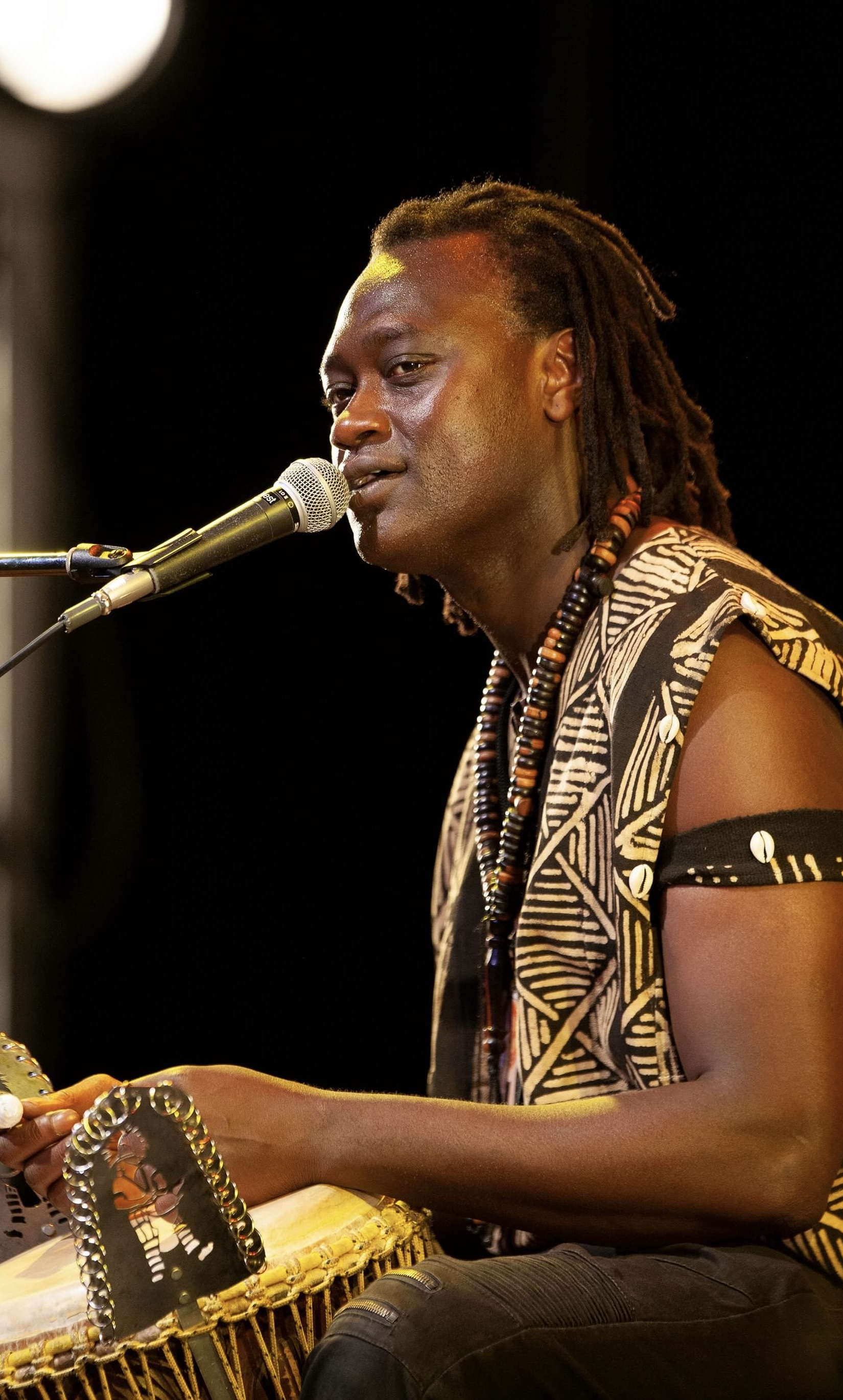
- Sy at a concert in Harajuku, 2021

Background information
- Born: September 12, 1972 (age 53)
- Origin: Gorée, Dakar, Senegal
- Occupations: Singer, percussionist
- Years active: 1990s–present
- Website: latyrsy.com

Latyr Sy is a Senegalese singer and percussionist based in Tokyo.

== Biography ==
Born on September 12, 1972, on the island of Goree, a world heritage site off the coast of Dakar in Senegal, West Africa, Latyr Sy began playing African drums, djembe, at a young age. Recognized for his extraordinary talent as a percussionist, he made his mark initially in Senegal at official VIP ceremonies for such as Thatcher, former British prime minister, Mitterrand, former president of France, Nelson Mandela, former president of South Africa, and Pope John Paul II.

Immediately after arriving in Japan in 1995, he performed with Shonosuke Okura (a holder of Important Intangible Cultural Property, Noh musician) in Beijing, Tianjin, Dalian, Harbin and Shanghai. In 1998, together with Ikue Asazaki, he traveled to Cuba to give a performance at a celebration of the 100th Anniversary of Japanese Immigration to Cuba. He visited France, Germany and Egypt as well for a tour organized by Kiyohiko Semba (Japanese Hayashi music performer, percussionist) in 2000.

Soon after performing with Mannojo Nomura (Kyogen performer) at a concert held in the Republic of Korea in 2002, they were invited to the Silk Road Festival produced by Yo-yo Ma in Washington.D.C, opened by former US secretary of state Colin Powell, at the Smithsonian Center for Folklife and Cultural Heritage. He traveled likewise in Ethiopia, Kenya, Djibouti and Vietnam with renowned artists such as Yas-Kaz (percussionist) and Kaiji Moriyama (dancer) for performances organized by Agency for Cultural Affairs, Government of Japan.

In Japan as well, he has been performing onstage with big-name artists such as Takako Shirai, ORIGINAL LOVE and Naoto Inti Raymi. In August 2019, he demonstrated his impregnable position as the best African percussionist in Japan by being invited to perform at the official dinner graced with the presence of Emperor and Empress, hosted by Prime Minister Shinzo Abe during TICAD IIV meeting.

Latyr is talented not only as percussionist and singer, but also as songwriter and actor. His work on commercial includes ASICS, Daiwa House, Toyota Tsusho, YAMAHA, National Geographic, UNIQLO, etc. Having also appeared in the TV shows such as Schola (NHK), FNS Music Festival (Fuji TV) and ZIP (Nihon TV), he made his first film appearances on “HIBANA” followed by “Punk Samurai Slash Down” co-starring with Go Ayano, Keiko Kitagawa, etc.

== Discography ==
with Flying Rhythms

- Flying Rhythms (2004)
- Doragon Balls (2004)
- N'DANKA N'DANKA (2005)
- Rhythm Connection (2005)
- Do The Waves (2006)
- Specialoose Fly (2006)

with Rourou

- Lotus Lotus Lotus (2004)

with Leyona

- Rainy Blue (2006)

with The Tchiky's

- The Tchiky's (2011)
