= Djibouti–Japan relations =

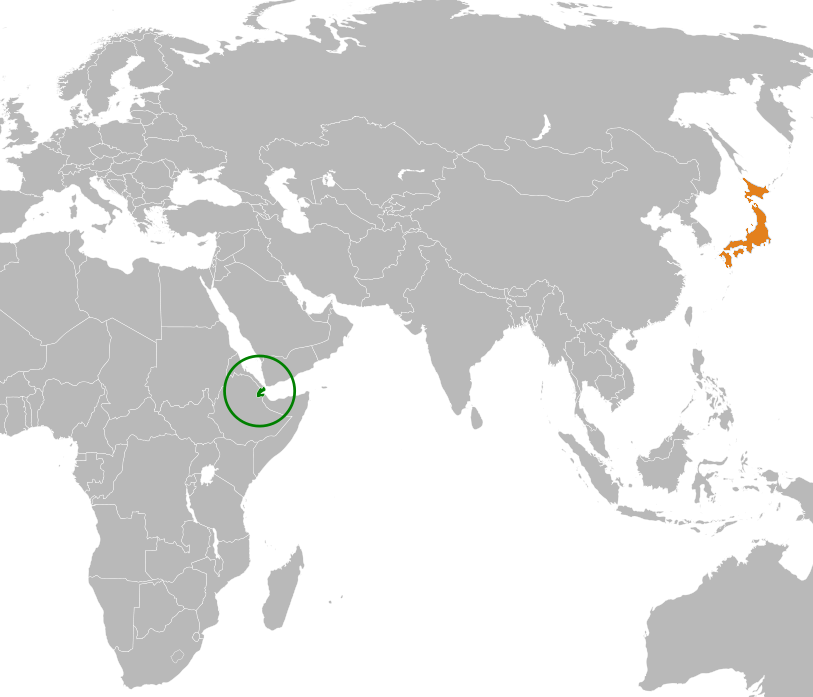
- Djibouti: Japan

Djibouti–Japan relations are bilateral relations between Djibouti and Japan. Djibouti has maintained an embassy in Tokyo since 1989, whilst Japan has maintained an embassy in Djibouti City since 2009.

== History ==
On 27 June 1977, Japan recognized Djibouti as a sovereign state. Diplomatic ties between Djibouti and Japan were established in 1978. Around a decade later, in 1989, the Djiboutian government established an embassy in Tokyo. The Japanese government, on the other hand, established an embassy in Djibouti City in 2009.

== State visits ==
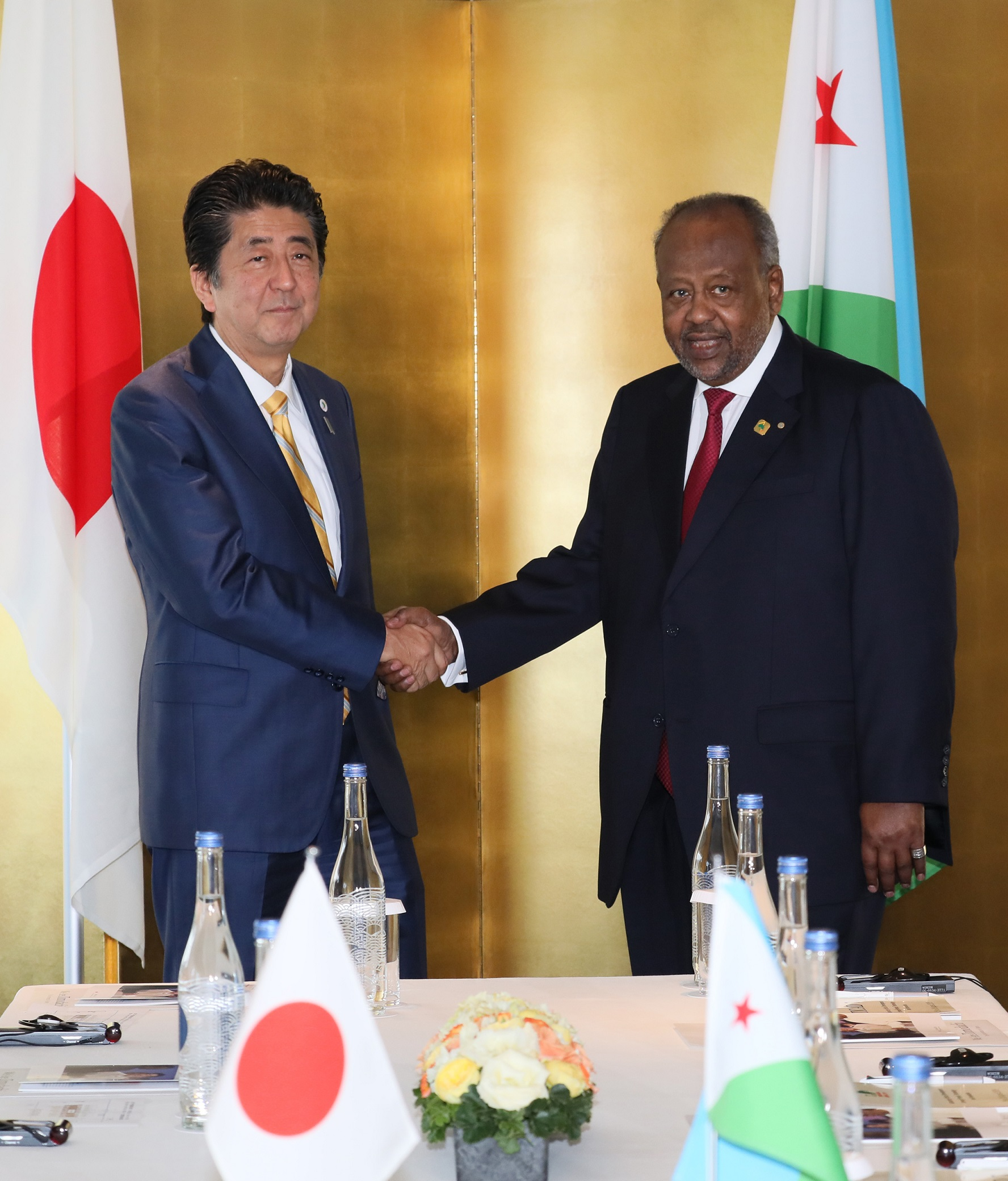
Djiboutian President Ismaïl Omar Guelleh (right) met with Japanese PM Shinzō Abe at the Prime Minister's Office, Tokyo on 29 August 2019.

President Hassan Gouled Aptidon made state visits to Japan in 1995 and 1998. Aptidon later made a second visit in 1998 to Japan for TICAD-II.

President Ismaïl Omar Guelleh also made state visits to Japan in September 2003, May 2008 for TICAD-IV, 19–22 December 2010, January 2013 for TICAD-V, August 2019 for TICAD-VII.

== Military ties ==
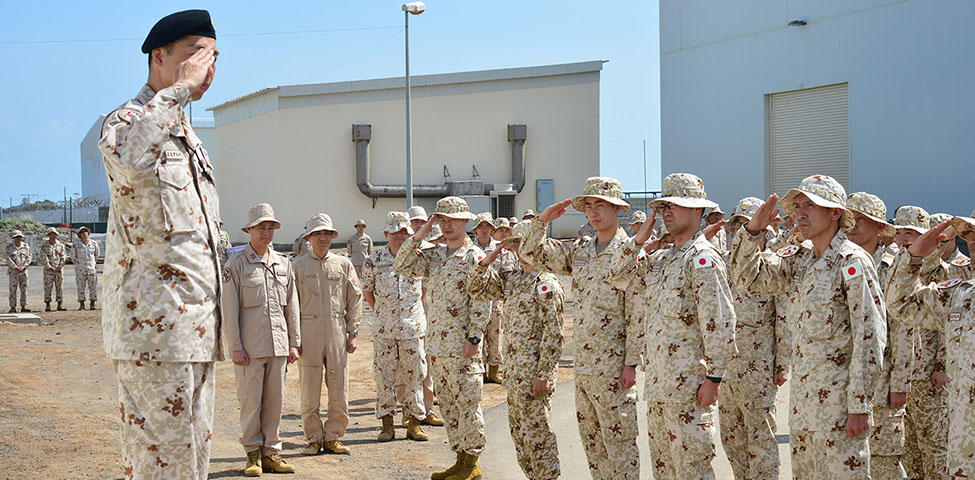
Japan Ground Self-Defense Force officers and soldiers in East Africa anti-piracy operations

Japan's Maritime Self-Defense Force (MSDF) has maintained an overseas military base in Djibouti since 2011. Japanese forces in Djibouti are tasked with escorting ships and combating piracy in the Gulf of Aden and the Red Sea. The MSDF has been operating in Djibouti since 2009, when they shared facilities with American forces at Camp Lemonnier, until the establishment of their own base in 2011.

== See also ==
- Foreign relations of Djibouti
- Foreign relations of Japan
