= Azerbaijan–Djibouti relations =

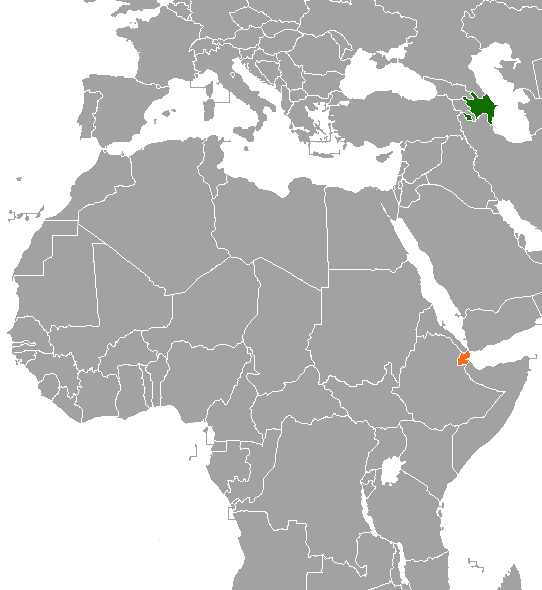

- Azerbaijan: Djibouti

Current and historical relationships exist between Azerbaijan and Djibouti. Neither country has a resident ambassador. Both countries are members of the Non-Aligned Movement.

== History ==
Diplomatic relations between Azerbaijan and Djibouti were established on 22 October 1996. The relations between two countries have been further strengthened after 2016. The Republic of Djibouti fully respects sovereignty and internationally recognized territorial integrity of the Republic of Azerbaijan. In 2017, a parliamentary delegation headed by speaker of Djibouti parliament made a trip to Azerbaijan to attend the international forum on intercultural dialogue.

== Inter-parliamentary ties ==
On 14 April 2017, the Parliament of Republic of Azerbaijan adopted a decision on establishment of a working group on inter-parliamentary relations between Azerbaijan and Djibouti. Vusal Huseynov – member of the Azerbaijani Parliament is the chair of the working group.

On 3 May 2017, the speaker of Azerbaijan's Parliament Ogtay Asadov received the delegation led by President of the National Assembly of the Republic of Djibouti Mohamed Ali Houmed.

== Partnership in humanitarian action ==
On 10 April 2017, a plane carrying humanitarian aid was sent from Baku to Djibouti. The humanitarian aid was sent by the Ministry of Emergency Situations according to the order of the President of the Republic of Azerbaijan. The aid included drinking water, sugar, tea, sunflower oil, corn oil, flour, macaroni, vermicelli, etc.

== Partnership in civil aviation ==
On 30 November 2016, during the visit of President of Azerbaijan Airlines CJSC to the Republic of Djibouti a Memorandum of Understanding was signed between Azerbaijan Airlines and Djibouti airlines to expand cooperation. Moreover, an agreement was reached to open Baku–Djibouti cargo transportation flight, as well as to establish Azerbaijan–Djibouti joint cargo transportation company.

== Recognition of Khojaly Massacre ==
In January 2017, the National Assembly of the Republic of Djibouti adopted a resolution which recognized the Khojaly Massacre as acts of genocide and crimes against humanity. The resolution also touches upon the occupation of Azerbaijani territories by Armenia.

== See also ==
- Foreign relations of Azerbaijan
- Foreign relations of Djibouti
