= Djibouti–Kenya relations =

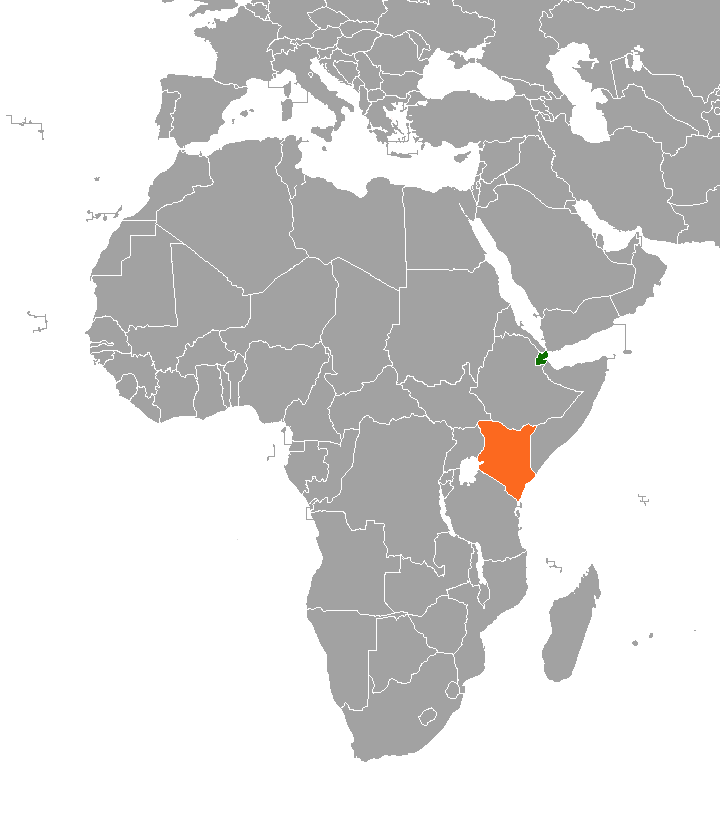
- Djibouti: Kenya

Djibouti–Kenya relations are bilateral relations between Djibouti and Kenya. Both nations are members of the African Union and the United Nations.

== History ==
Djibouti and Kenya first established diplomatic ties on 27 June 1977, after Djibouti's independence.

In May 2021 President Kenyatta visited Djibouti to attend the inauguration of President Guelleh.

Both countries are founding members of COMESA. Additionally, the two nations are founding members of the IGAD trade bloc.

Djibouti's President Guelleh made a state visit to Kenya and held talks with President Kenyatta in May 2018. The agreements signed during the visit included cooperation in trade, protection of investments, agriculture, vocational training and exemption of visas for diplomatic passport holders.

In 2011, while on tour of Djibouti, Kenya's Ambassador Extra-Ordinary and Plenipotentiary, Monica K. Juma met with Djiboutian President, Ismail Omar Guelleh. She also held talks with the Djiboutian Minister for Foreign Affairs, Speaker of the National Assembly, Minister for Education, Minister for Transport, the Chamber of Commerce, the investment promotion agency and the tourism board.

Djibouti and Kenya are also security partners as part of the AMISOM Mission in Somalia.

== Trade ==
In 2005, Djibouti exported US$1.4 million worth of commodities to Kenya. Around 11% or US$8.7 million of Djibouti's total imports also consisted of goods from Kenya. In addition, Djibouti has bilateral trade and cooperation agreements with Kenya.

== Resident diplomatic missions ==
- Djibouti has an embassy in Nairobi.
- Kenya has an embassy in Djibouti City.

== See also ==
- Foreign relations of Djibouti
- Foreign relations of Kenya
