= List of diplomatic missions of Djibouti =

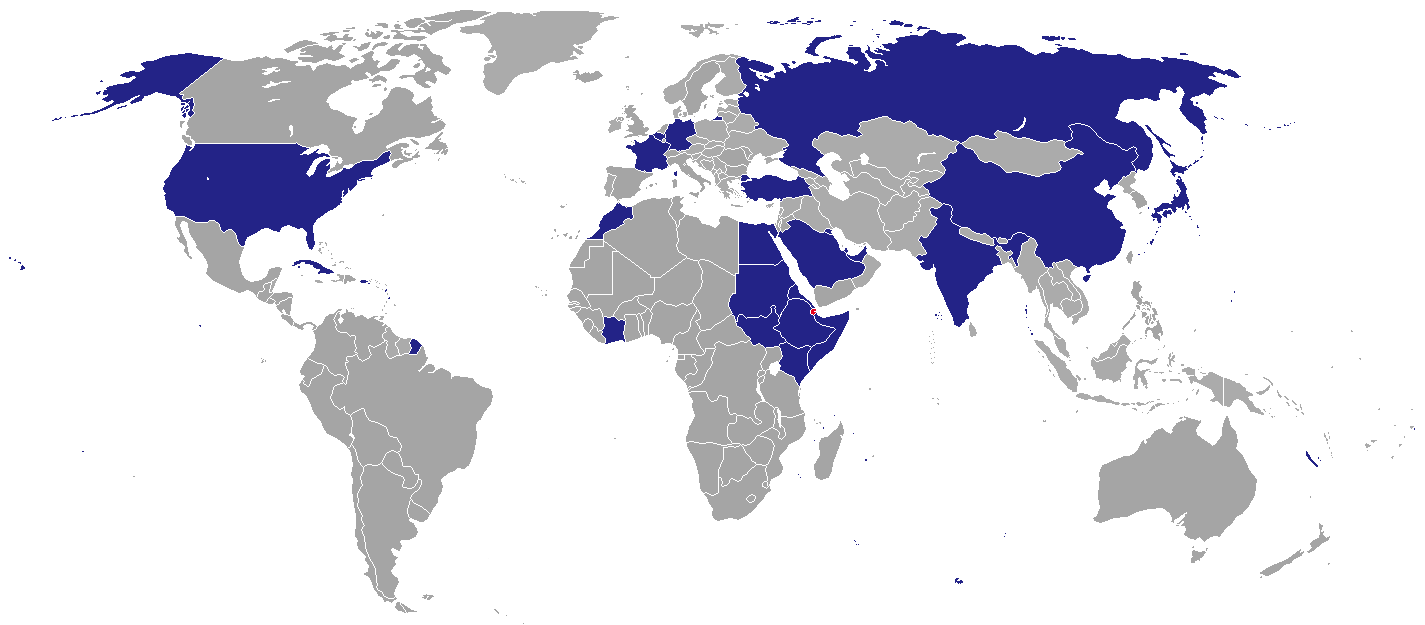
Diplomatic missions of Djibouti

This is a list of diplomatic missions of Djibouti, excluding honorary consulates. Foreign relations of Djibouti are handled primarily by the President as the head of state, the Prime Minister as the head of government, and the Minister of Foreign Affairs. Its overseas presence is comparatively small.

== Current missions ==
=== Africa ===
Host country	Host city	Mission	Concurrent accreditation	Ref.
Egypt	Cairo	Embassy	Countries: Lebanon; Libya; Palestine; Syria; Multilateral Organizations: Arab League	
Eritrea	Asmara	Embassy		
Ethiopia	Addis Ababa	Embassy	Countries: Angola; Burundi; Chad; Congo-Brazzaville; Equatorial Guinea; Rwanda; Seychelles; Multilateral Organizations: African Union	
Ethiopia	Dire Dawa	Consulate-General	Countries: Angola; Burundi; Chad; Congo-Brazzaville; Equatorial Guinea; Rwanda; Seychelles; Multilateral Organizations: African Union	
Ivory Coast	Abidjan	Embassy	Countries: Congo-Kinshasa; Gabon; Ghana; Senegal	
Kenya	Nairobi	Embassy	Countries: South Africa; Tanzania; Uganda; Zambia; Multilateral Organizations: United Nations; United Nations Environment Programme; United Nations Human Settlements Programme	
Morocco	Rabat	Embassy	Countries: Mauritania	
Morocco	Dakhla	Consulate-General	Countries: Mauritania	
Somalia	Mogadishu	Embassy		
South Sudan	Juba	Embassy		
Sudan	Port Sudan (Note: Originally in Khartoum, was relocated to Port Sudan as a result of the ongoing civil war.)	Embassy		

=== Americas ===
Host country	Host city	Mission	Concurrent accreditation	Ref.
Cuba	Havana	Embassy	Countries: Argentina; Brazil; Mexico; Nicaragua; Panama; Venezuela	
United States	Washington, D.C.	Embassy	Countries: Canada	

=== Asia ===
Host country	Host city	Mission	Concurrent accreditation	Ref.
China	Beijing	Embassy		
India	New Delhi	Embassy	Countries: Bangladesh; Sri Lanka	
Japan	Tokyo	Embassy	Countries: Australia; Indonesia; Malaysia; New Zealand; Philippines; Singapore; Thailand; Vietnam	
Kuwait	Kuwait City	Embassy	Countries: Iraq; Jordan	
Qatar	Doha	Embassy	Countries: Iran	
Saudi Arabia	Riyadh	Embassy	Countries: Bahrain; Oman; Multilateral Organizations: Organisation of Islamic Cooperation	
Turkey	Ankara	Embassy		
United Arab Emirates	Abu Dhabi	Embassy		

=== Europe ===
Host country	Host city	Mission	Concurrent accreditation	Ref.
Belgium	Brussels	Embassy	Countries: Denmark; Luxembourg; Netherlands; Norway; Sweden; Multilateral Organizations: European Union; Food and Agriculture Organization; International Fund for Agricultural Development; Organisation for the Prohibition of Chemical Weapons	
France	Paris	Embassy	Countries: Algeria; Iceland; Italy; Monaco; Portugal; Spain; Tunisia; United Kingdom; Multilateral Organizations: UNESCO	
Germany	Berlin	Embassy	Countries: Austria; Czechia; Poland	
Russia	Moscow	Embassy	Countries: Finland	

=== Multilateral organizations ===
Organization	Host city	Host country	Mission	Concurrent accreditation	Ref.
United Nations	New York City	United States	Permanent Mission	Countries: Guatemala	
United Nations	Geneva	Switzerland	Permanent Mission	Countries: Switzerland	

== Gallery ==
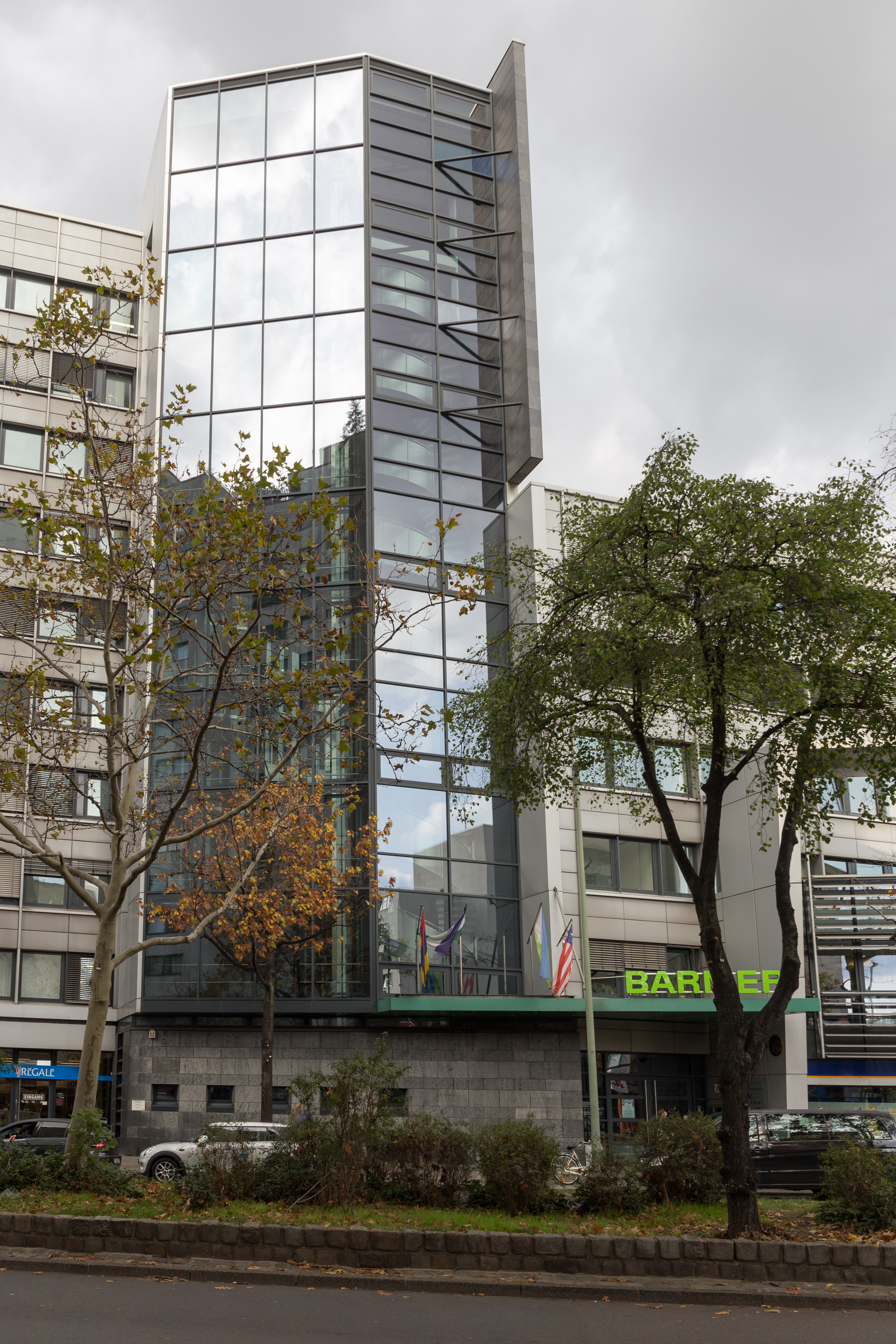
Embassy in Berlin

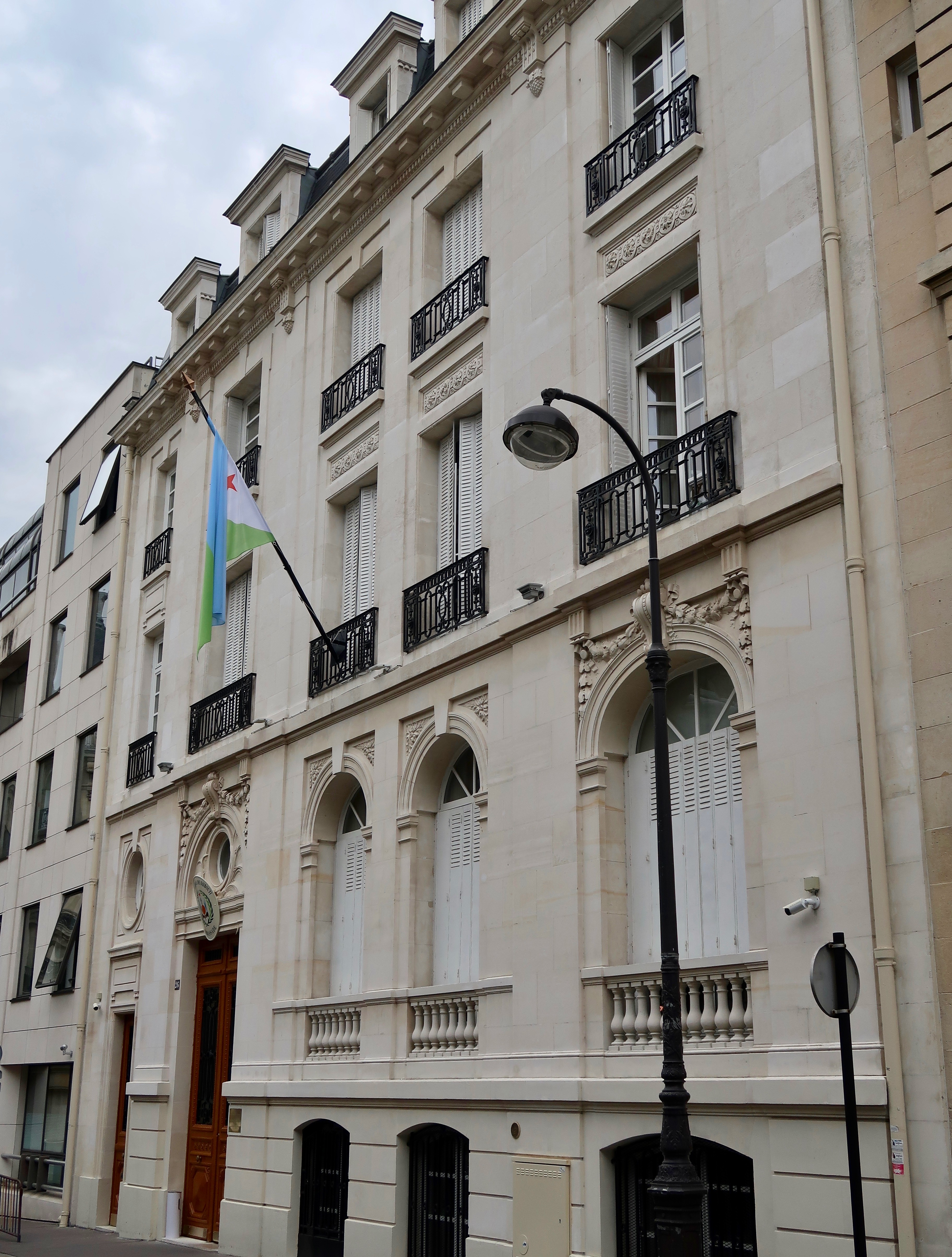
Embassy in Paris

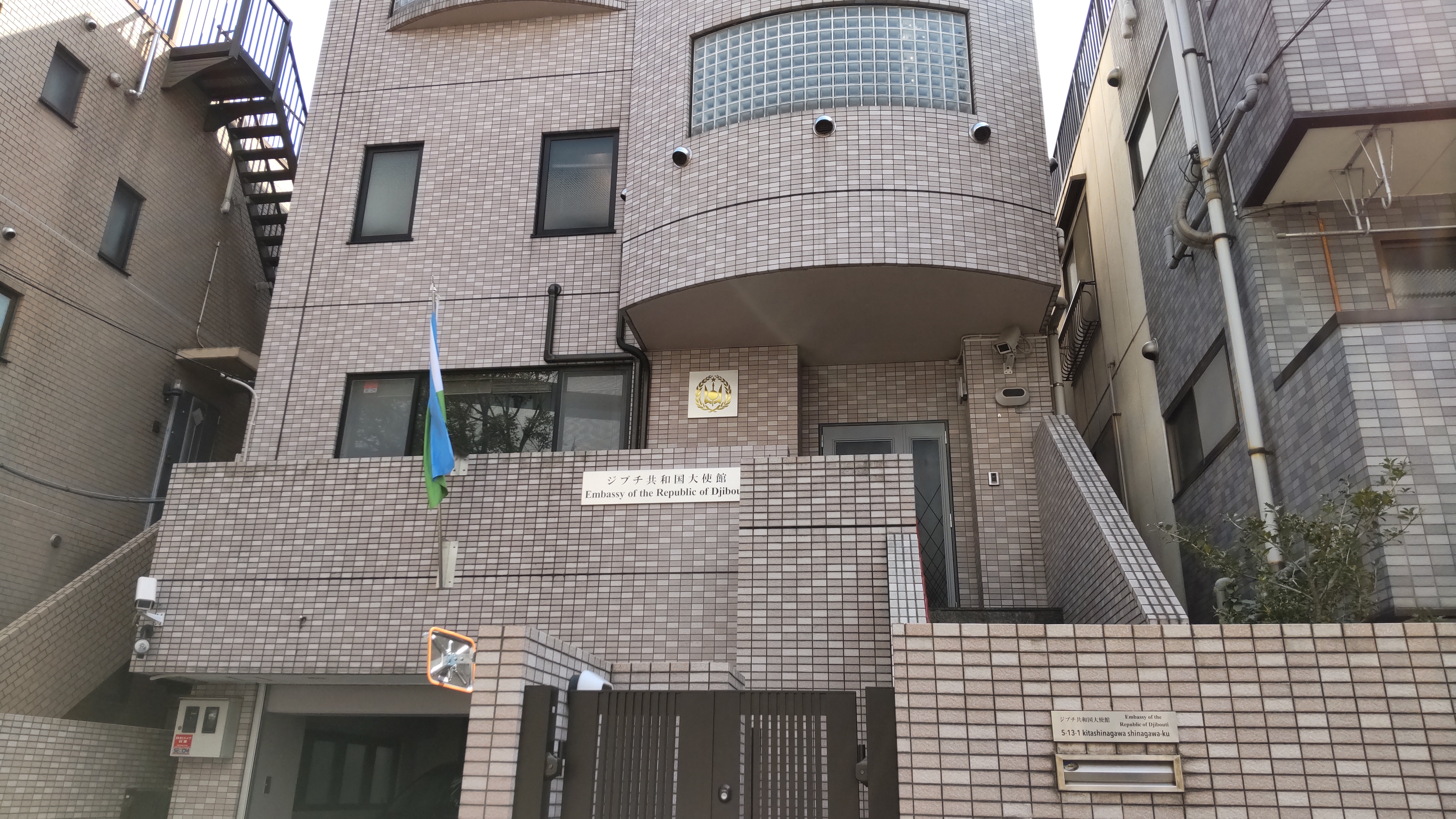
Embassy in Tokyo

== Closed missions ==
=== Africa ===
Host country	Host city	Mission	Year closed	Ref.
Somaliland	Hargeisa	Liaison Office	2025	

== See also ==
- Foreign relations of Djibouti
- List of diplomatic missions in Djibouti
- Visa policy of Djibouti
