= Flying Rhythms =

Background information
- Origin: Tokyo, Japan
- Genres: Drum and bass, ambient, electronic
- Years active: 2002 - present
- Label: LASTRUM
- Members: Naoyuki Uchida; Latyr Sy; Yoshio Kuge
- Website: www.lastrum.co.jp/flyingrhythms

Flying Rhythms are a drum and bass musical group. Founded in Tokyo in 2002, the band's current lineup consists of Naoyuki Uchida and Latyr Sy and Yoshio Kuge. They have released five studio albums. The drummer KUGE and percussionist LATYR play minimalistic, primal beats on the stage while the sound engineer UCHIDA remixes the beats. Their unique and original style has caught the attention of DJs like David Mancusso, Nick the Record of Lifeforce Records, and Adrian Sherwood of On-U Sound Records. In 2004 Flying Rhythms released their first self-titled album, Flying Rhythms. In 2005 they released a re-mix album called Rhythm Connection and second album N'DANKA N'DANKA the following year. In 2006 they released a 38-minute-long version called "Do The Waves". In 2007 they released a new dance album, Rhythm Mebius.

== Discography ==
- Flying Rhythms (2004)
- Doragon Balls (2004)
- N'DANKA N'DANKA (2005)
- Rhythm Connection (2005)
- Do The Waves (2006)
- Specialoose Fly (2006)
