= Djibouti–Yemen relations =

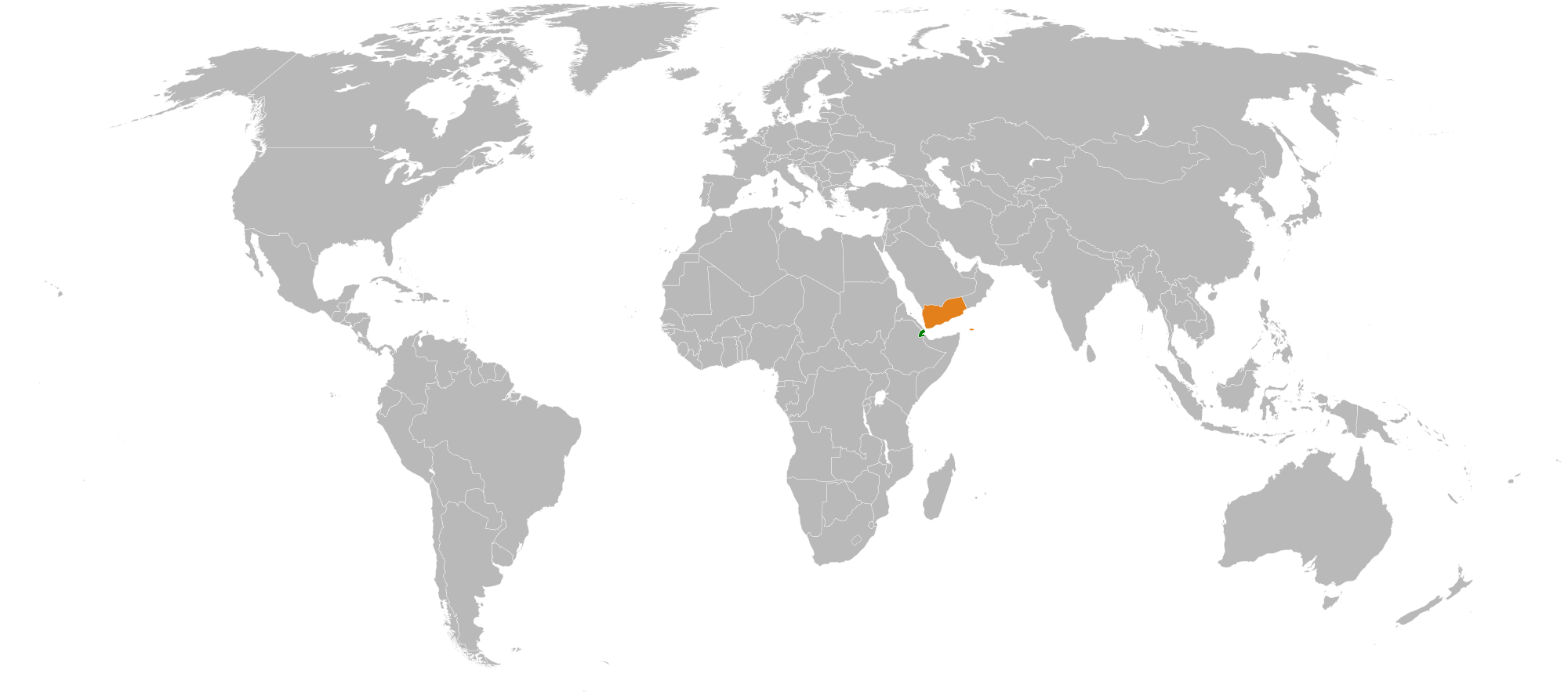
- Djibouti: Yemen

Djibouti–Yemen relations are the bilateral relations between Djibouti and Yemen. Yemen has an embassy in Djibouti City. Djibouti had an embassy in Sanaa which closed in 2015.

== Historical relations ==
Djibouti and Yemen have long-standing ties due to their geographical proximity across the Bab el-Mandeb Strait. Historical relations between the two fellow Arab League members are strong, and cooperation takes place on many levels. The Bridge of the Horns, a project linking both territories, has also been tabled.

== See also ==
- Foreign relations of Djibouti
- Foreign relations of Yemen
