= List of diplomatic missions in Djibouti =

This is a list of diplomatic missions in Djibouti. The capital Djibouti currently hosts 25 embassies.

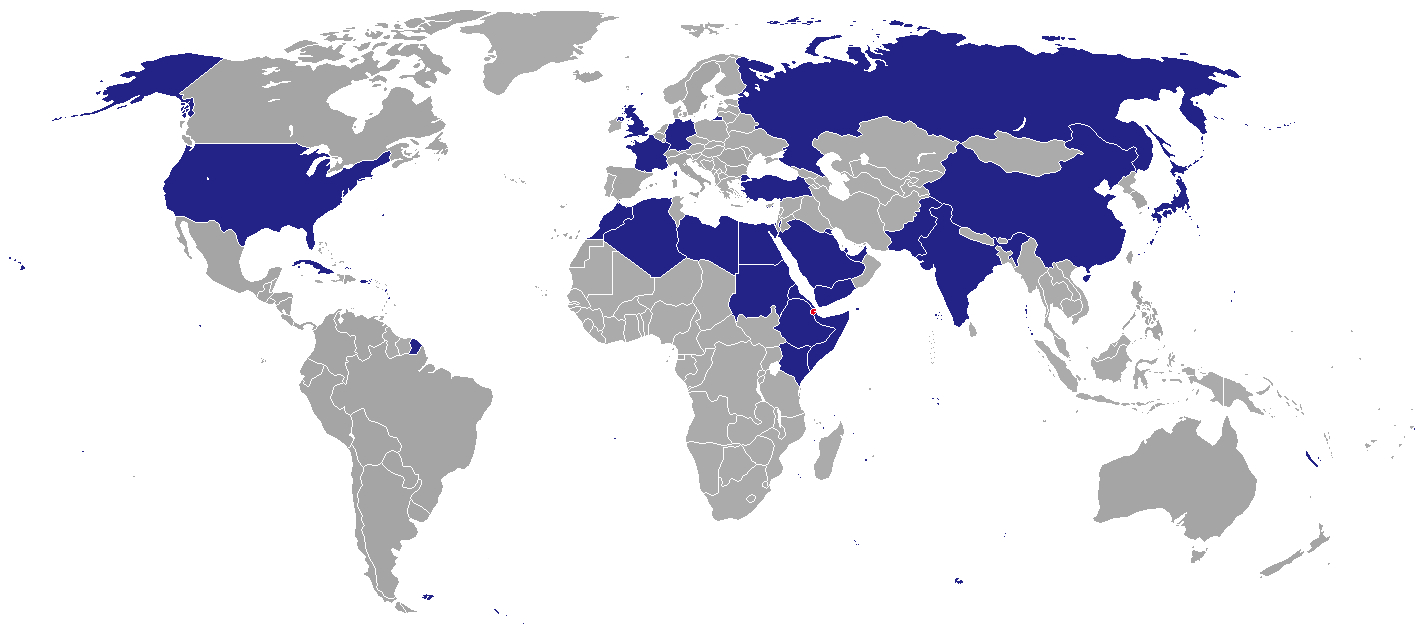
Countries with diplomatic missions in Djibouti

== Embassies in Djibouti City ==
1. Algeria
2. China
3. Cuba
4. Egypt
5. Eritrea
6. Ethiopia
7. France
8. Germany
9. India
10. Japan
11. Kenya
12. Kuwait
13. Libya
14. Morocco
15. Pakistan
16. Palestine
17. Qatar
18. Russia
19. Saudi Arabia
20. Somalia
21. Sudan
22. Turkey
23. [[|]]United Kingdom
24. United States
25. Yemen

== Other missions or delegations in Djibouti City ==
1. European Union (Delegation)
2. Somaliland (Representation office)

== Gallery ==
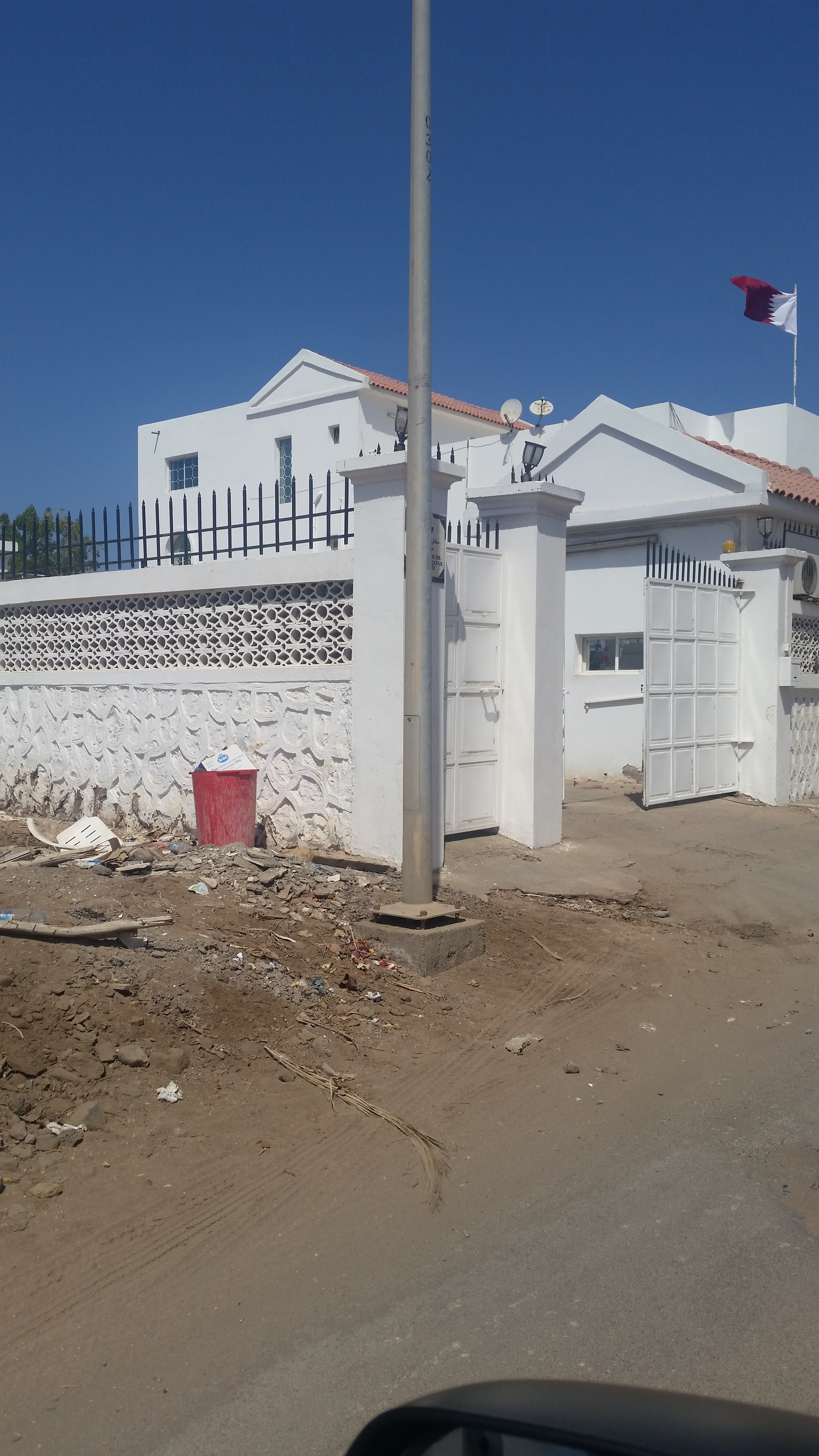
Embassy of Qatar

== Non-resident embassies accredited to Djibouti ==
=== Resident in Addis Ababa, Ethiopia ===
1. Angola
2. Argentina
3. Armenia
4. Azerbaijan
5. Australia
6. Austria
7. Belgium
8. Bulgaria
9. Burundi
10. Canada
11. Central African Republic
12. Colombia
13. Congo-Kinshasa
14. Czechia
15. Denmark
16. Finland
17. Greece
18. Hungary
19. Indonesia
20. Iran
21. Ireland
22. Italy
23. Kazakhstan
24. Mali
25. Malta
26. Mexico
27. Netherlands
28. New Zealand
29. Norway
30. Poland
31. Portugal
32. Senegal
33. Seychelles
34. Slovakia
35. Spain
36. South Africa
37. South Korea
38. Sweden
39. Switzerland
40. Tanzania
41. Tunisia
42. Venezuela
43. Zimbabwe

=== Resident in Cairo, Egypt ===
1. Croatia
2. Mauritania
3. Philippines
4. Romania
5. Thailand
6. Vietnam

=== Resident elsewhere ===
1. Bangladesh (Riyadh)
2. Dominican Republic (Riyadh)
3. Serbia (Nairobi)

=== Unverified ===
- Bahrain (Riyadh)
- Brazil
- Cameroon
- Costa Rica (Nairobi)
- Ecuador (Cairo)
- Jordan (Riyadh)
- Kosovo (Riyadh)
- Lebanon (Riyadh)
- Laos (New Delhi)
- Maldives (Riyadh)
- Malaysia (Muscat)
- Sierra Leone
- Taiwan (Riyadh)
- Timor-Leste (Geneva)

== See also ==
- Foreign relations of Djibouti
- List of diplomatic missions of Djibouti
