= Djibouti–Somalia relations =

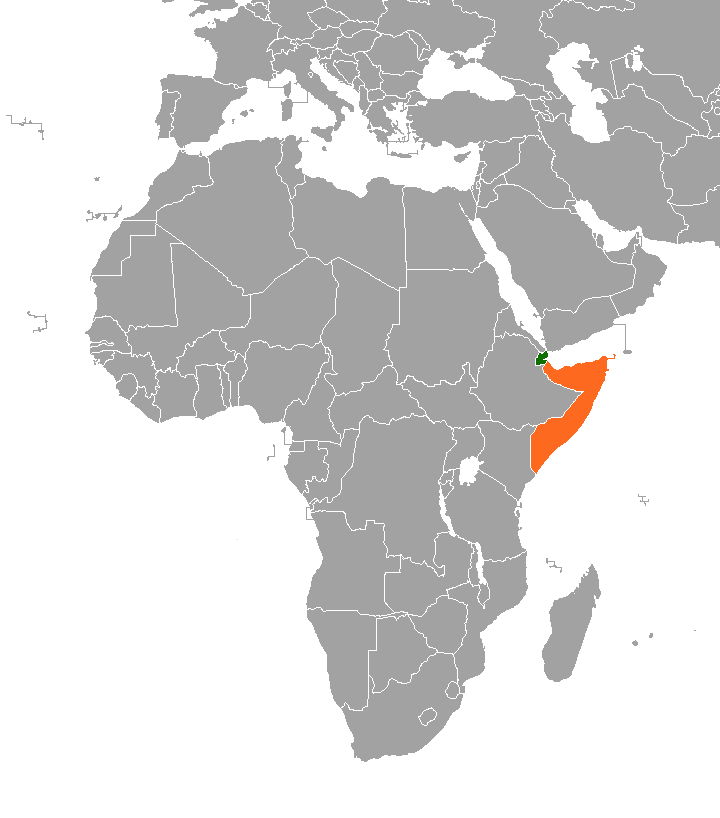
- Djibouti: Somalia

Djibouti–Somalia relations are bilateral relations between Djibouti and Somalia. Both countries are members of the African Union.

== History ==
Djibouti and Somalia maintain close relations owing to their shared history and similar demographic composition, with the Somali ethnic group constituting the majority population element in both countries.

During the Ogaden War (13 July 1977 – 15 March 1978) fought between the Somali government and Ethiopia's Derg regime, the Djiboutian authorities forwarded military intelligence to Somalia's authorities.

After the start of the civil war in Somalia in the early 1990s, Djibouti, as the headquarters of the Intergovernmental Authority on Development regional body, became an active participant in the Somali peace process. In 2000, Djibouti hosted the Arta conference, as well as the 2008–2009 talks between the Transitional Federal Government and the Alliance for the Reliberation of Somalia, which led to the formation of a coalition government. Djibouti later joined the African Union Mission to Somalia in 2011.

Following the establishment of the Federal Government of Somalia in 2012, a Djibouti delegation also attended the inauguration ceremony of Somalia's new president.

== See also ==
- Foreign relations of Djibouti
- Foreign relations of Somalia
