= Djibouti–Turkey relations =

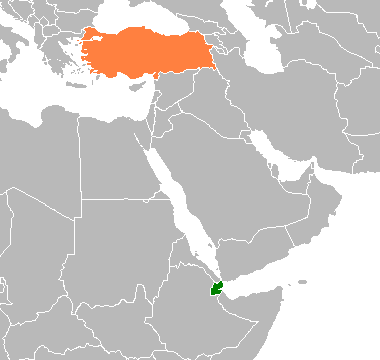
- Turkey: Djibouti

Diplomatic mission
- Embassy of Turkey, Djibouti: Embassy of Djibouti, Ankara

Djibouti–Turkey relations are the bilateral relations between Djibouti and Turkey. Currently, Turkey has an embassy in Djibouti since 2013, while Djibouti has an embassy in Ankara since 2012. Turkey and Djibouti share a good relationship due to them having Islam as their major religion. Turkey has been interested in doing investments in Djibouti.

== Diplomatic relations ==
Both countries officially established diplomatic relations in 1977. The Abdülhamid II Mosque, the biggest mosque in Djibouti, was funded by the Turkish Diyanet Foundation. The building includes a school section as well.

== High-level visits ==
President of Djibouti Ismaïl Omar Guelleh visited Turkey 4 times, all of them between 2009 and 2018 and President of Turkey Recep Tayyip Erdoğan visited Djibouti once in January 2015.

== Economic relations ==
Trade volume between the two countries was $196,000,000 in 2018 and $251,000,000 in 2019. The fourth Turkey-Djibouti Joint Economic Commission (JEC) meeting was in Ankara on 18–19 February 2020.

== Educational relations ==
Turkey is providing scholarships to Djiboutian students since 1992, as part of the Türkiye Scholarships.

== Military relations ==
Turkey export unmanned aerial vehicles (UAVs) to Djibouti.

== See also ==
- Foreign relations of Turkey
- Foreign relations of Djibouti
