= Djibouti–Russia relations =

Bilateral relations between Djibouti and Russia

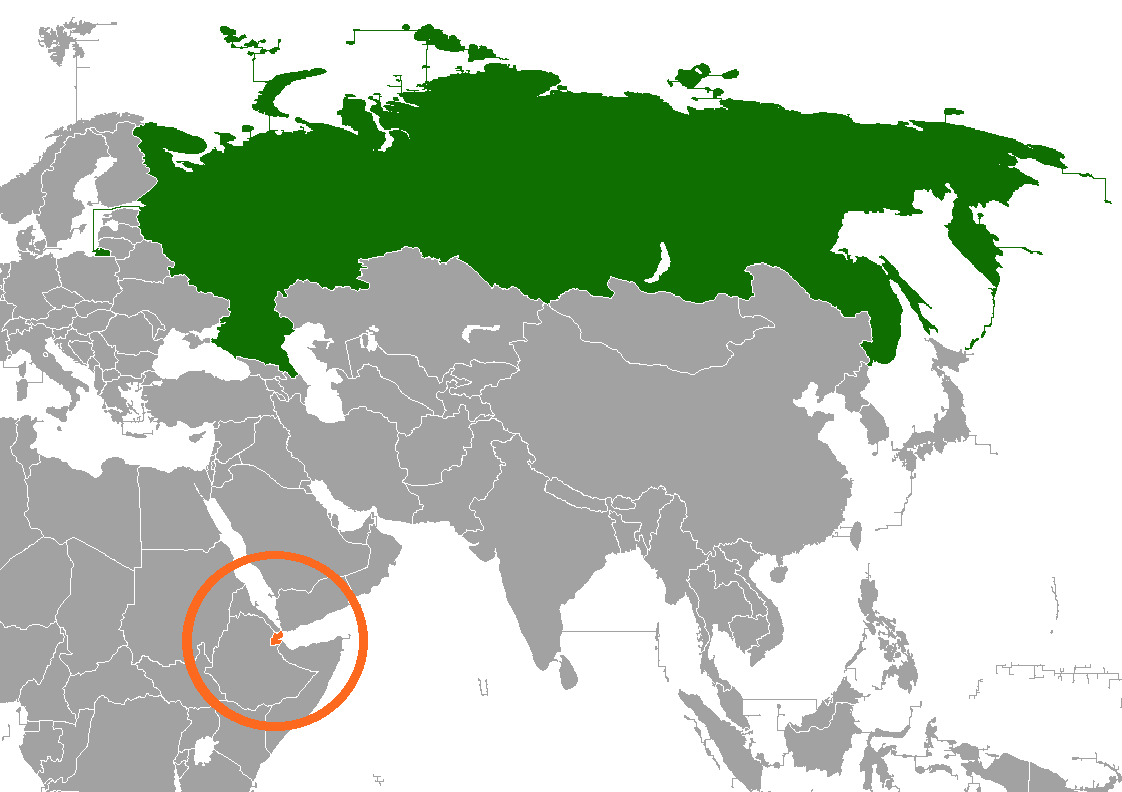
- Russia: Djibouti

Djibouti–Russia relations (Российско-джибутийские отношения) are the diplomatic relations between the State of Djibouti and the Russian Federation. The Soviet Union and Djibouti established diplomatic relations on 3 April 1978. Djibouti has an embassy in Moscow and Russia has an embassy in Djibouti City.

== Recent developments ==
Prior to the invasion of Ukraine, Russia had been attempting to tighten its relationship with Djibouti, which had drawn closer to China and is a member of the Belt and Road Initiative. In 2015, Russia resumed diplomatic relations with Djibouti that had been ended in 1978, with a meeting between Russian Minister of Foreign Affairs Sergey Lavrov and Djibouti Minister of Foreign Affairs and International Cooperation, Mahmoud Ali Yusuf. The talks concluded with a bilateral military agreement under which the Djibouti Armed Forces would be trained by Russian advisors, and equipped with Russian arms and vehicles. In 2021, Russia and Djibouti entered an agreement on cooperation in politics, trade, the economy, investment activity, education, and healthcare. On 25 January 2022, the summit "Russia-Ethiopia-Djibouti: Prospects for Business Development" was held between dignitaries from Russia, Ethiopia and Djibouti, and was hosted by the Coordinating Committee for Economic Cooperation with African Countries of the Chamber of Commerce and Industry of the Russian Federation to further the presence of Russian companies in the region.

Russia's investments in Djibouti increased after Russia invaded Ukraine, and Djibouti became one of Russia's few open allies in the region. On 15 March 2023, Russia, China, and Iran held joint naval exercises in the Gulf of Oman, operating out of the Chinese naval base in Djibouti City. Russia was planning to build its own naval base in the city because Russian warships routinely use the port to resupply, and China has stated Russia is free to use the Chinese base to dock its ships, such as the Admiral Kuznetsov. The Russian paramilitary Wagner Group also maintains a presence in Djibouti, further straining relations with the United States, which maintains its own military base Camp Lemonnier in Djibouti. As part of the Black Sea Grain Initiative, most of the grain being exported by Ukraine in agreement with Russia was sent to Djibouti to be distributed to the rest of the Horn of Africa under Russia's supervision.

== See also ==
- List of ambassadors of Russia to Djibouti
- Sagallo, Djiboutian village occupied by a Russian expedition in 1889
