= Djibouti–Ethiopia relations =

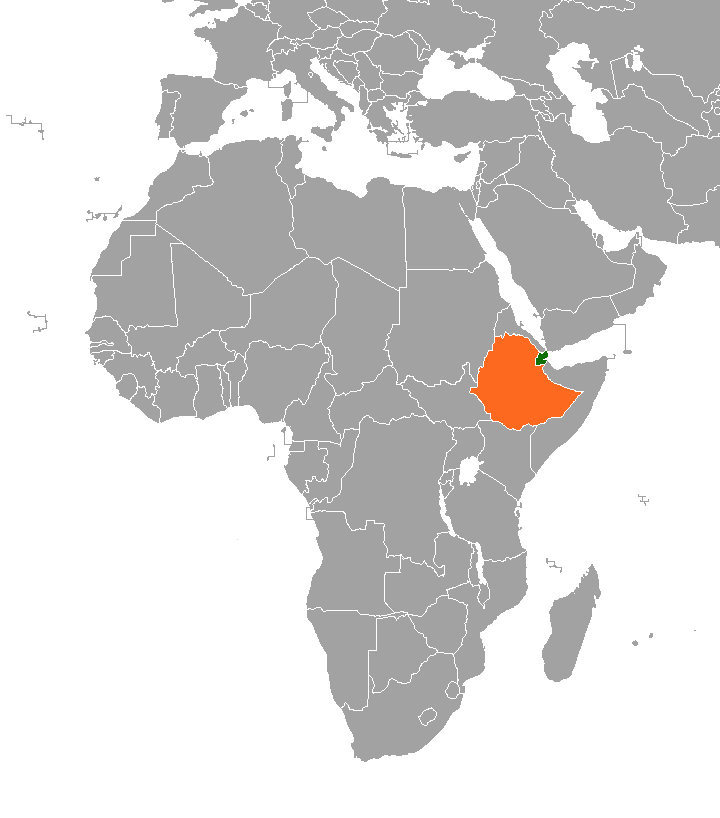

- Djibouti: Ethiopia

Djibouti–Ethiopia relations are the bilateral relations between Djibouti and Ethiopia. Both countries are members of the African Union, Group of 77 and Non-Aligned Movement. Djibouti has an embassy in Addis Ababa and a Consulate-General in Dire Dawa. Ethiopia has an embassy in Djibouti city.

== History ==
Diplomatic relations between the two countries was established in 1984. Relations between the countries are generally good. Both countries share ownership of the Addis Ababa-Djibouti Railway; however, this utility and offer is in need of repairs and upgraded capacity. The railroad is tied to the Port of Djibouti, which provides port facilities and trade ties to landlocked Ethiopia.

== See also ==
- Djibouti-Ethiopia border
- Foreign relations of Djibouti
- Foreign relations of Ethiopia
