= Djibouti–France relations =

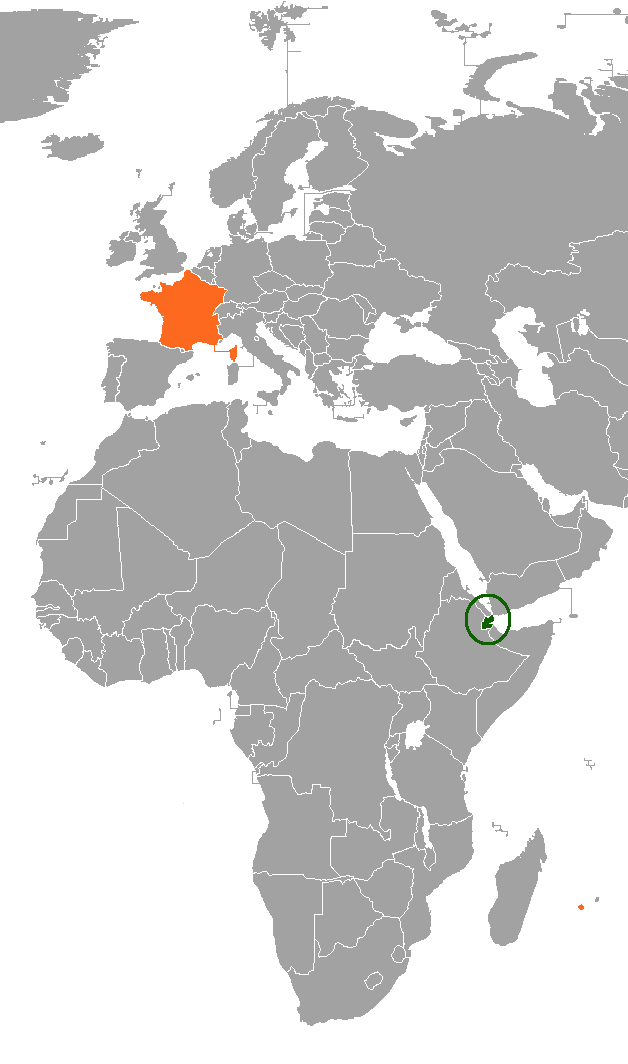
- Djibouti: France

Djibouti–France relations are the current and historical relationship between Djibouti and France. Djibouti was obtained as a colony by France in 1862. France officially controlled Djibouti until it received independence in 1977. Djibouti maintains military and economic agreements with France, which provide continued security and economic assistance. The largest French military base in Africa is located in Djibouti's territorial waters in the Red Sea. In December 2023, a new defense cooperation treaty is under discussion for renewal.

== Resident diplomatic missions ==
- Djibouti has an embassy in Paris.
- France has an embassy in Djibouti City.
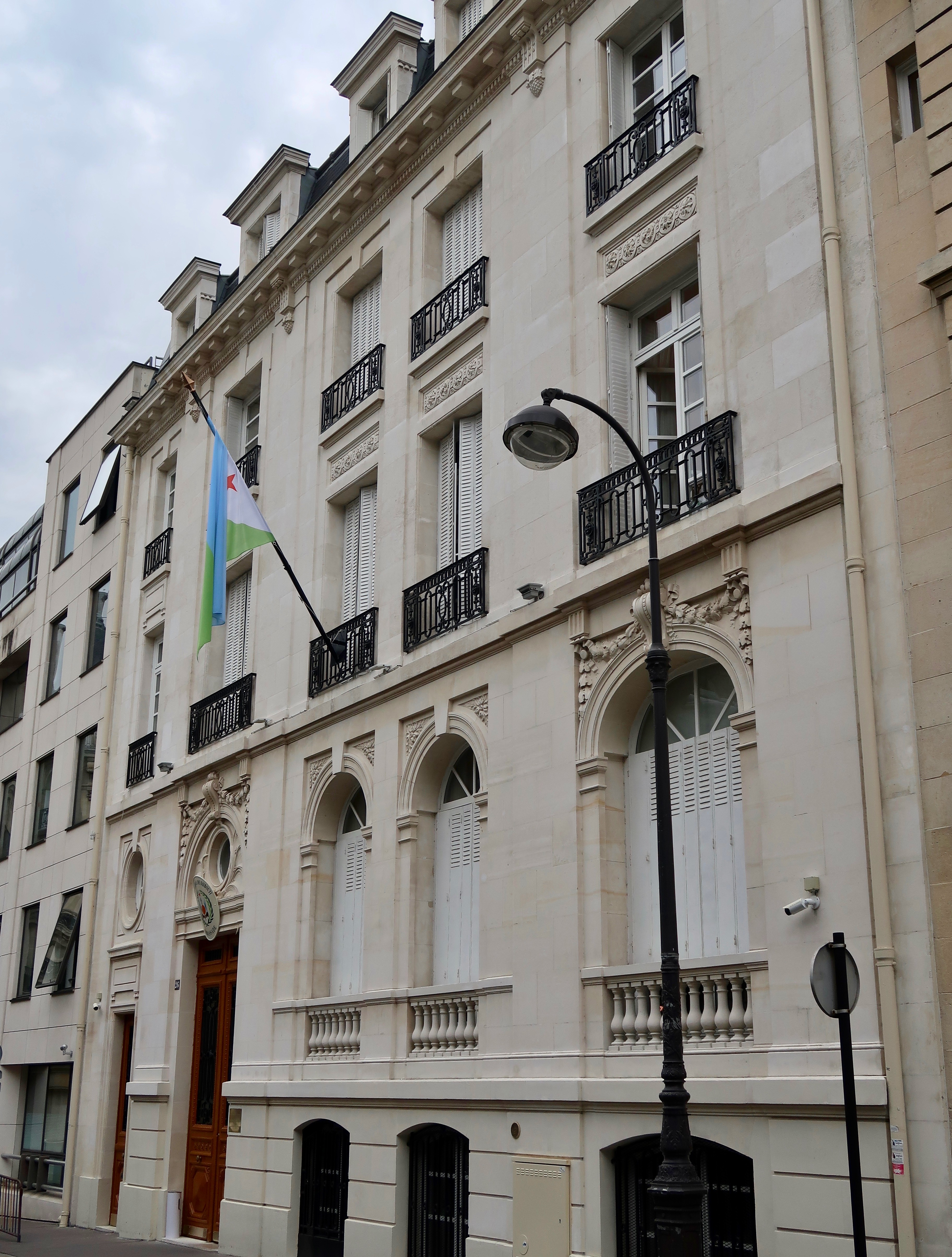
Embassy of Djibouti in Paris
