= TICAD Delegations =

TICAD Delegations are those attending the Tokyo International Conference on African Development (TICAD), which is a conference held every five years in Japan with the objective "to promote high-level policy dialogue between African leaders and development partners." The first four of these conferences were held in Tokyo; and the fifth one was held in nearby Yokohama.

TICAD has been an evolving element in Japan's long-term commitment to fostering peace and stability in Africa through collaborative partnerships. The exchange of views amongst the conference delegates serves to underscore the case for more, not less assistance from the major world economies.

The TICAD conferences were intended to help to promote high-level policy dialogue amongst African leaders and their development partners.

== TICAD-I (1993) ==
TICAD-I discussed strategies for taking steps toward greater African stability and prosperity. This conference produced the "Tokyo Declaration on African Development."

=== African Countries ===
Delegations from 48 African nations participated in the conference, including four heads of state:

- Democratic and People's Republic of Algeria, Slim Tahar Debagha
- People's Republic of Angola, Armando Mateus Cadete
- Republic of Benin, Nicéphore Soglo, President -- Benin Head of State
- Republic of Botswana, G.K.T. Chiepe
- Burkina-Faso, Blaise Compaore, President -- Burkina Faso Head of State
- Republic of Burundi, Bernard Ciza
- Republic of Cameroon, Augustin Frederic Kodock
- Republic of Cape Verde, José Tomás Wahnon de Carvalho Veiga
- Central African Republic, Thierry Bingaba
- Republic of Chad, Ibni Oumar Mahamat Saleh
- Federal Islamic Republic of the Comoros, Caabi El Yachrouti Mohamed
- Republic of Congo, Benjamin Bounkoulou
- Republic of Côte d'Ivoire, Daniel Kablan Duncan
- Republic of Djibouti, Abdou Bolok Abdou
- Arab Republic of Egypt, Said Rifaat
- Republic of Equatorial Guinea, Faustino Nguema Esono
- State of Eritrea, Haile Woldense
- Federal Democratic Republic of Ethiopia, Duri Mohammed
- Gabonese Republic, Jean Mindoumbi
- Republic of the Gambia, Bakary Bunja Dabo
- Republic of Ghana, Jerry John Rawlings, President -- Ghana Head of State
- Republic of Guinea, Ibrahima Sylla
- Republic of Guinea-Bissau, Nelson Gomez Dias
- Republic of Kenya, George Saitoti
- Kingdom of Lesotho, Selometsi Baholo
- Republic of Madagascar, Ramarozaka Maurice
- Republic of Malawi, L.J. Chimango
- Republic of Mali, Mahamar Oumar Maiga
- Islamic Republic of Mauritania, Taki Ould Sidi
- Republic of Mauritius, Nababsing Paramhamsa
- Kingdom of Morocco, Rachidi El Rhezouani
- Republic of Mozambique, Pascoal Manuel Mocumbi
- Republic of Namibia, Hidipo L. Hamutenya
- Republic of Niger, Abdoulkarimou Seyni
- Federal Republic of Nigeria, Isaac Aluko-Olokun
- Republic of Rwanda, Rucogoza Faustin
- Democratic Republic of São Tomé and Príncipe, Mateus Meira Rita
- Republic of Senegal, Papa Ousmane Sakho
- Republic of Seychelles, Danielle de St. Jorre
- Republic of Sierra Leone, Karefa A.F. Kargbo
- Kingdom of Swaziland, A.P. Mkhonza
- United Republic of Tanzania, John Samuel Malecela
- Republic of Togo, Yanja Yenchabre
- Republic of Tunisia, Hannichi Salah
- Republic of Uganda, Yoweri Museveni, President -- Uganda Head of State
- Republic of Zaire, Gbiamango Yewawa
- Republic of Zambia, Ronald Penza
- Republic of Zimbabwe, Nathan M. Shamuyarira

=== Donor Countries ===
Representatives from twelve developed countries participated in the conference. A delegation from what was then known as the Commission of the European Communities was also attended.

- Kingdom of Belgium, Eric Drtyce
- Canada, Huguette Labelle
- Kingdom of Denmark, Helle Degn
- French Republic, Antoine Pouilleute
- Federal Republic of Germany, Harald Ganns
- Republic of Italy, Carmelo Azzará
- Kingdom of the Netherlands, Roland van den Berg
- Kingdom of Norway, Randi Krumsvik Bendiksen
- Portuguese Republic, Jose Briosa e Gala
- Kingdom of Sweden, Alf T. Samuelsson
- United Kingdom of Great Britain and Northern Ireland, Lynda Chalker, Baroness Chalker of Wallasey
- United States of America, George Moose
- European Commission (formerly known as the Commission of the European Communities), Peter Pooley

=== Observers (Countries) ===
Observers from 17 nations were accredited at the conference; and these included:

- Commonwealth of Australia, Geoffrey Miller
- Republic of Austria, Johannes Skriwan
- Republic of Brazil, Paulo Pires do Rio
- People's Republic of China, Sun Guangxiang
- Republic of Finland, Gien Lindolm
- Hellenic Republic, Vassilios Tolois
- Republic of Hungary, István Rácz
- Republic of Indonesia, Poedji Koentarso
- Republic of Ireland, James Anthony Sharkey
- Republic of Korea, Park Jay Son
- Grand-Duchy of Luxembourg, François Bremer
- Malaysia, Datuk H.M. Khatib
- Romania, Tatiana Isticioaia
- Russian Federation, Sergei Krilov
- Republic of South Africa, D.W. Auret
- Kingdom of Spain, Francisco Javier Jimenez de Gregorio
- Swiss Confederation, Peter Reinhardt

=== Observers (NGOs and Others) ===
Observers from eleven non-governmental organizations (NGOs) and others were amongst the participants at this conference, including:

- African American Institute, Vivian Lowery Derryck
- NGO Forum "Africa Now", Yoko Ozeki
- African National Congress (South Africa), Jerry Matsila
- Africa Watch, William Carmichael
- CARE (relief) (Japan), Kiyohisa Mikanagi
- Carter Center, Richard Joseph
- Crown Agents for Oversea Governments and Administrations, Mark Hughes
- Development Bank of Southern Africa (DBSA), Nick Christodoulou
- South-North Development Institute, Roberto Mizrahi
- Synergos Institute, Peggy Dulany
- Trust for Peace and Prosperity in South and Southern Africa (TPPSSA), Robert Tusenius

=== Observers (Japanese Organizations) ===
Observers from five Japanese organizations were participants in the conference, including:

- Japan Export-Import Bank (JEXIM), Kenji Hashimoto
- Institute Developing Economies (IDE), Takehiko Haraguchi
- Japan External Trade Organization (JETRO), Koichi Kobayashi
- Japan International Cooperation Agency (JICA), Takeshi Kagami
- Overseas Economic Cooperation Fund (OECF), Shunro Kageyama

== TICAD-II (1998) ==
TICAD-II discussed poverty reduction in Africa and Africa's fuller integration into the global economy. in 1998. This conference produced the "Tokyo Agenda for Action" (TAA), which was intended to become a commonly understood strategic- and action-oriented set of guidelines. Ideas proposed at TICAD-II were also taken up by the G8 in the creation of the Global Fund to fight AIDS, Tuberculosis and Malaria.

=== African Countries ===
Delegations from 51 African nations participated in the conference, including eight heads of state:

- Democratic and People's Republic of Algeria, Boudjemaa Delmi
- Repùblica de Angola, António Domingos Pitra Costa Neto
- République du Bénin, Mathieu Kérékou, Président -- Benin Head of State
- Republic of Botswana, Festus Mogae, President -- Botswana Head of State
- Burkina-Faso, Blaise Compaore, Président -- Burkina Faso Head of State
- République du Burundi, Célestin Niyongabo
- Republique du Cameroun, Justin Nidoro
- Repùblica de Cabo Verde, Jose Luis Jesus
- République Centrafricaine, Jean Mete-Yapende
- République du Tchad, Mahamat Saleh Annaadif
- République Fédérale Islamique des Comoros, Salim H. Himidi
- République du Congo, Rodolphe Adada
- République Démocratique du Congo, Badimanyi Mulumba
- République de Côte d'Ivoire, Kablan Duncan Daniel
- République de Djibouti, Hassan Gouled Aptidon, Président -- Djibouti Head of State
- Arab Republic of Egypt, Ibrahim Ali Hassan
- República de Guinea Ecuatorial, Teresa Efua Asangono
- State of Eritrea, Berhane Abreche
- Federal Democratic Republic of Ethiopia, Meles Zenawi
- République Gabonaise, Vincent Boulé
- Republic of The Gambia, Famara Jatta
- Republic of Ghana, Jerry John Rawlings, President -- Ghana Head of State
- République de Guinée, Mamadou Cellou Diallo
- República da Guinée-Bissau, Issufo Sanha
- Republic of Kenya, A. Godana
- Kingdom of Lesotho, L. V. Ketso
- Republic of Liberia, Monie R. Captan
- Great Socialist People's Libyan Arab Jamahiriya, Saad M. Mujber
- République de Madagascar, Lila Ratsifandrihamanana
- Republic of Malaŵi, Cassim Chilumpha
- République du Mali, Alpha Oumar Konaré, Président -- Mali Head of State
- République Islamique de Mauritanie, Sid'El Moctar Ould Naji
- République de Maurice, Rundheersing Bheenick
- Royaume du Maroc, Sâad Eddine Taib
- República da Moçambique, Joaquim Chissano, President -- Mozambique Head of State
- République du Niger, Ibrahim Assane Mayaki
- Federal Republic of Nigeria, T. A. O. Odegbile
- République Rwandaise, Pierre Celestin Rwigema
- República Democrática de São Tomé and Príncipe, Francisco Carlos Afonso Fernandes
- République du Sénégal, Mouhamadou El Moustapha Diagne
- Republic of Seychelles, Jeremie Bonnelame
- Republic of Sierra Leone, James Jonah
- Republic of South Africa, Thabo Mbeki
- Republic of the Sudan, Abdalla Hassan Ahmed
- Kingdom of Swaziland, King Mswati III -- Swaziland Head of State
- United Republic of Tanzania, Fredrick T. Sumaye
- République Togolaise, Barry Moussa Barque
- République Tunisienne, Fathi Merdassi
- Republic of Uganda, Sam Kuteesa
- Republic of Zambia, Edith Nawiki
- Republic of Zimbabwe, Richard C. Hove

=== Asian Countries ===
Delegations from 10 Asian nations participated in the conference, including:

- Brunei Darussalam, Dato Malai Haji Ahmad Murad.
- People's Republic of China, Zhang Cixin.
- Republic of India, Siddharth Singh
- Republic of Indonesia, Ir. Zuhal
- Republic of Korea, Shin Kee-bock
- Malaysia, Mahathir Mohamad, Prime Minister
- Republic of the Philippines, Jesus I. Yabes
- Republic of Singapore, Zainul Abidin Rasheed
- Kingdom of Thailand, Sukhumbhand Paribatra
- Socialist Republic of Viet Nam, Nguyen Quoc Dung

== TICAD-III (2003) ==
TICAD III reviewed the achievements of the ten-year TICAD process and discussed the future direction TICAD should take. TICAD-III brought together over 1000 delegates, including 23 heads of state and the Chairperson of the African Union.

Flag	Nation	Head of State	Office	Notes
Algeria	Algeria		.	
Angola	Angola		.	
Botswana	Botswana		.	
Burundi	Burundi		.	
Cameroon	Cameroon		.	
Côte d'Ivoire	Côte d'Ivoire		.	
Central African Republic	Central African Republic		.	
Mauritania	Mauritania		.	
Eritrea	Eritrea		.	
Sudan	Sudan		.	
Benin	Benin		.	
Burkina Faso	Burkina Faso		.	
Mozambique	Mozambique		.	
Rwanda	Rwanda		.	
Kenya	Kenya		.	
Tanzania	Tanzania		.	
African Union	African Union	Thabo Mbeki	President	
Sierra Leone	Sierra Leone		.	
Ghana	Ghana	John Agyekum Kufuor	President	
Zambia	Zambia		.	
South Africa	South Africa	Thabo Mbeki	President	
Swaziland	Swaziland	Mswati III	King	
Uganda	Uganda		.	
Mauritius	Mauritius		.	
Malawi	Malawi		.	
Democratic Republic of the Congo	Democratic Republic of Congo		.	
Chad	Chad		.	
Niger	Niger		.	
Nigeria	Nigeria		.	
Togo	Togo		.	
Tunisia	Tunisia		.	
Seychelles	Seychelles		.	
Somalia	Somalia		.	
São Tomé and Príncipe	São Tomé and Príncipe		.	
Sahrawi Arab Democratic Republic	Sahrawi Arab Democratic Republic		.	
Zimbabwe	Zimbabwe		.	
Republic of the Congo	Republic of Congo		.	
Djibouti	Djibouti		.	
Egypt	Egypt		.	
Equatorial Guinea	Equatorial Guinea		.	
Ethiopia	Ethiopia		.	
Gambia	Gambia		.	
Guinea	Guinea		.	
Gabon	Gabon		.	
Cape Verde	Cape Verde		.	
Namibia	Namibia		.	
Madagascar	Madagascar		.	
Comoros	Comoros		.	
Liberia	Liberia		.	
Lesotho	Lesotho		.	
Libya	Libya		.	
Mali	Mali		.	
Guinea-Bissau	Guinea-Bissau		.	
Senegal	Senegal		.	

== Ministers and others ==
A number of government ministers and others were amongst the participants in the conference, including:

Flag	Nation	Delegate	Office	Notes
Japan	Japan	Junichiro Koizumi	Prime Minister	
Japan	Japan	Yoshiro Mori	former-Prime Minister	
Japan Ministry of Finance	Japan			
Japan Ministry of Foreign Affairs	Japan			
Japan International Cooperation Agency	Japan International Cooperation Agency			
Japan Bank for International Cooperation	Japan Bank for International Cooperation			
Japan External Trade Organization (JETRO)	Japan External Trade Organization			
United Nations	United Nations			
United Nations World Food Programme	World Food Programme			
United Nations Children's Fund (UNICEF)	United Nations Children's Fund			-- formerly "United Nations International Children's Emergency Fund" (1947-1953); name shortened, but acronym unchanged
United Nations Industrial Development Organization (UNIDO)	United Nations Industrial Development Organization	Carlos Magariños	Director-General	
World Bank	World Bank			
African Development Bank	African Development Bank			
European Union	European Union			

== TICAD-IV (2008) ==
TICAD-IV focused on strategies for better mobilizing the knowledge and resources of the international community in the core areas of: (a) economic growth; (b) human security, including achieving the UN's Millennium Development Goals; and (c) environment/climate change issues. In addition, TICAD-IV tried to identify possible inter-linkages within the context of the G8 Hokkaidō Tōyako Summit in July 2008. The event brought together 2,500 participants, including representatives of 51 African countries, among whom were 40 African heads of state and government. Attendees came from over 70 international organizations.

=== Heads of State ===
Invitations were extended to 52 African countries and many heads of state decided to attend, including:

Flag	Nation	Head of State	Office	Notes
Mauritania	Mauritania	Sidi Mohamed Ould Cheikh Abdallahi	President	
Eritrea	Eritrea	Isaias Afwerki	President	
Sudan	Sudan	Omar al-Bashir	President	
Benin	Benin	Yayi Boni	President	
Burkina Faso	Burkina Faso	Blaise Compaoré	President	
Mozambique	Mozambique	Armando Guebuza	President	
Rwanda	Rwanda	Paul Kagame	President	
Kenya	Kenya	Mwai Kibaki	President	
Tanzania	Tanzania	Jakaya Mrisho Kikwete	President	
African Union	African Union	Jakaya Mrisho Kikwete	President	
Sierra Leone	Sierra Leone	Ernest Bai Koroma	President	
Ghana	Ghana	John Agyekum Kufuor	President	
Zambia	Zambia	Levy Mwanawasa	President	
South Africa	South Africa	Thabo Mbeki	President	
Swaziland	Swaziland	Mswati III	King	
Uganda	Uganda	Yoweri Museveni	President	
Malawi	Malawi	Bingu wa Mutharika	President	
Republic of the Congo	Republic of the Congo	Denis Sassou Nguesso	President	
Gabon	Gabon	Omar Bongo Ondimba	President	
Cape Verde	Cape Verde	Pedro Verona Rodrigues Pires	President	
Namibia	Namibia	Hifikepunye Pohamba	President	
Madagascar	Madagascar	Marc Ravalomanana	President	
Comoros	Comoros	Ahmed Abdallah Mohamed Sambi	President	
Liberia	Liberia	Ellen Johnson Sirleaf	President	
Mali	Mali	Amadou Toumani Touré	President	
Guinea-Bissau	Guinea-Bissau	João Bernardo Vieira	President	
Senegal	Senegal	Abdoulaye Wade	President]	

=== Ministers and others ===
A number of government officials and non-government organization delegates were amongst the participants in the conference, including:

	Nation/Organization	Delegate	Office	Notes
	Morocco	Abbas El Fassi	Prime Minister	
	Tunisia	Mohamed Ghannouchi	Prime Minister	
	Egypt	Ahmed Abul Gheit	Foreign Minister	
	Nigeria	Goodluck Jonathan	Vice President	
	Togo	Comlan Mally	Prime Minister	
	Nobel Foundation	Wangari Maathai	2004 Nobel Peace Prize laureate	
Europe	European Union	Louis Michel	Humanitarian Aid Commissioner	
	United Nations	Asha-Rose Migiro	UN Deputy Secretary-General	
	Lesotho	Pakalitha Mosisili	Prime Minister	
	Niger	Seini Oumarou	Prime Minister	
	Angola	Fernando da Piedade Dias dos Santos	Prime Minister	
	Botswana	Mompati Sebogodi	Vice President	
	Ethiopia	Meles Zenawi	Prime Minister	
	World Bank	Robert Zoellick	President	
	African Development Bank	Donald Kaberuka	President	
	Japan Ministry of Finance	Fukushiro Nukaga	Finance Minister	
	Japan Ministry of Foreign Affairs	Masahiko Kōmura	Foreign Minister	
	Japan External Trade Organization (JETRO)			
	United Nations World Food Programme	Josette Sheeran	Executive Director	
	United Nations Children's Fund (UNICEF)	Ann Veneman	Executive Director	
	United Nations High Commission for Refugees (UNHCR)	António Guterres	Executive Director	
	United Nations Industrial Development; Organization (UNIDO)	Kandeh Yumkella	Director-General	
	Gates Foundation Global Health Program	Tadataka "Tachi" Yamada	President	
	International Organization for Migration	Brunson McKinley	Director-General	
	Japan International Cooperation Agency	Sadako Ogata	President	
	Japan Bank for International Cooperation	Kōji Tanami	Governor	
	Nobel Foundation	Joseph Stiglitz	2001 Nobel Prize in Economics laureate	
	International Federation of Red Cross and Red Crescent Societies (IFRC)			
	University of Tsukuba	Yōichi Iwasaki	President	
	Mozambique	Joaquim Chissano	Former President	

=== Observers and others ===
The UN Development Programme (UNDP), in partnership with the NEPAD Business Group, the UN Conference on Trade and Development (UNCTAD) and the United Nations Industrial Development Organization (UNIDO) made plans in advance to organize on the sidelines of TICAD-IV. They worked together to create an event which they hoped would attract the attention of the national delegations in Yokohama for TICAD—a meeting which they called Innovative Approaches to Private Sector Development for achieving the Millennium Development Goals (MDGs) in Africa. The event organizers provided a unique venue for presentations included actual case studies developed by the UN organizations and first-hand testimonials from various local private sector actors who have been beneficiaries or advocates of TICAD-inspired private sector development initiatives in Africa. Selected new and innovative approaches by global partners were showcased to demonstrate how market-based business activities and private sector investments can help achieve the MDGs.

World Bank President Zoellick participated in a meeting on the global food crisis jointly-organized with the African Union, the World Food Programme, the Food and Agriculture Organization and the International Fund for Agricultural Development. This meeting was designed to focus attention on the immediate and medium-to-long term actions needed to tackle the global food crisis.

Some representatives from international non-governmental organizations (NGOs) complained their participation in the ongoing policy dialog between Japan and various African governments was thwarted at TICAD-IV. A group of 55 African, Japanese and international NGOs came uninvited to Yokohama; this was the first time that a 'civil society forum' was incorporated into the compressed agenda. Six observers were allowed in as observers; and the NGOs construe such limited participation as reflective of a view of NGOs as unimportant.

The shared perspectives of the TICAD-IV's official participants and unofficial observers served to underscore the case for immediate assistance to help Africa's vulnerable economies to weather the current global food and fuel crisis. Questions remain about how best to achieve such salutary goals.
