= Naval Special Forces (Malaysia) =

Special operations force of the Royal Malaysian Navy

Naval Special Warfare Forces
- Pasukan Khas Laut ڤاسوقن خاص لاءوت
- Official crest of PASKAL
- Active: 1 October 1982; 43 years ago
- Country: Malaysia
- Allegiance: HRH Sultan Sharafuddin Idris Shah Al Haj of Selangor
- Branch: Royal Malaysian Navy
- Type: Special forces
- Size: Classified
- Part of: Joint Forces Command; Defence Special Operations Division (DSOD)
- Garrison/HQ: Unit 1: HMS Malaya Navy Base, Lumut, Perak, Unit 2: HMS Sri Semporna Navy Base, Semporna, Sabah
- Nicknames: PASKAL, KD Panglima Hitam, Komando Tentera Laut (Navy Commando)
- Mottos: Sentiasa Terbaik ('Always The Best')
- Colour of Beret: Reddish Purple Beret
- March: Dari Jasamu Kami Abadikan ('From Your Kindness We Eternise')
- Engagements: Spratly Islands; UNOSOM II, Somalia; UNIVEM II, Angola; Operation Astute, East Timor; MALCON-UNIFIL, Lebanon; Operation Enduring Freedom – Horn of Africa; Operation Ocean Shield; Operation Dawn 8: Gulf of Aden; MALCON-ISAF, Afghanistan; 2013 Lahad Datu standoff MT Orkim Harmony hijacking

Commanders
- Current commander: First Admiral Hj Dato' Mohd Redzuan Bin Hj Talib, DSIS PAT KAT AMN KMN PJM PNBB PPS PPA MSoc Sc (UKM)Dip PSP (UM) mpat psc
- Notable commanders: First Admiral Prof. Dato' Dr. Sutarji Kasmin

Insignia
- PASKAL Emblem

- PASKAL Insignia

The Pasukan Khas Laut ('Naval Special Warfare Forces', Jawi: ڤاسوقن خاص لاءوت), commonly abbreviated to PASKAL, is the principal special operations force of the Royal Malaysian Navy.

PASKAL's task is to conduct small-unit maritime military operations that originate from, and return to a river, ocean, swamp, delta or coastline. PASKAL also performs unconventional warfare, guerrilla warfare, counter-guerrilla warfare, jungle warfare, counter-terrorism, close protection, hostage rescue and foreign internal defence.

Although PASKAL was created as a maritime counter-terrorism unit, it has become a multi-functional special operations unit with roles that include high-risk operations including direct action, special reconnaissance operations and other specialised missions.

PASKAL is an all-male force that was officially established on 1 October 1982, after a five-year setup period, with the purpose of enforcing Malaysia's Exclusive Economic Zone maritime claims through sea, air and land operations.

PASKAL personnel routinely serve and train with allied SOFs including the Australian SASR, Indonesian Kopassus and Denjaka, Singaporean Naval Diving Unit, Thai Navy SEALs, US Green Berets and US Navy SEALs.

== History ==
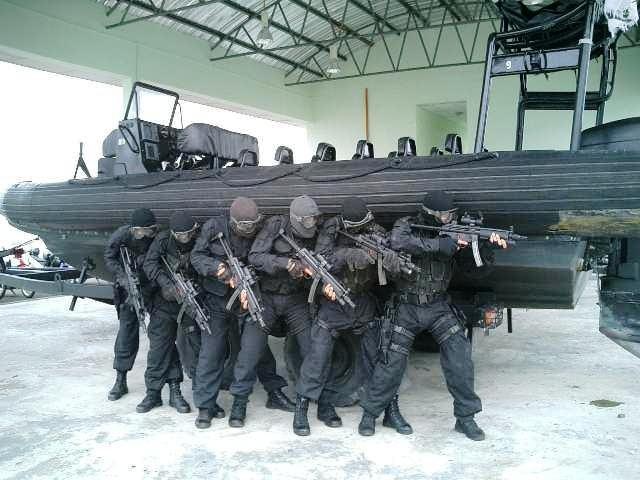
PASKAL team with tactical BDUs conducting CQC drills.

The PASKAL was founded unofficially in 1977. It was originally known as the Royal Malaysian Navy (RMN) Naval Commando Unit based in Woodlands, Singapore; which was formerly known as HMS PELANDOK at Khatib Camp, Sembawang, Singapore. This unit is under the RMN Security Regiment Organisation (Malay: Organisasi Rejimen Keselamatan) which now known as the Navy Provos (Malay: Provos Tentera Laut; Protela).

PASKAL has its origins in a perceived need for a security regiment trained in modern maritime operations. The unit's main purpose was the protection of Malaysia's naval bases and national assets. (At that time, the Royal Malaysian Navy; RMN main base was known as KD Malaya (Kapal Diraja Malaya; His Majesty's Ship Malaya), formerly known as HMS Malaya before independence, in Woodlands, Singapore, which was later transferred to the new naval base in Lumut, Perak when it was completed in 1979.

The Security Regiment is largely composed of sailors responsible for the security of strategic sites such as bases and ammunition depots. When the main naval base at Lumut became available PASKAL headquarters was established there in 1981.

=== Initial training ===
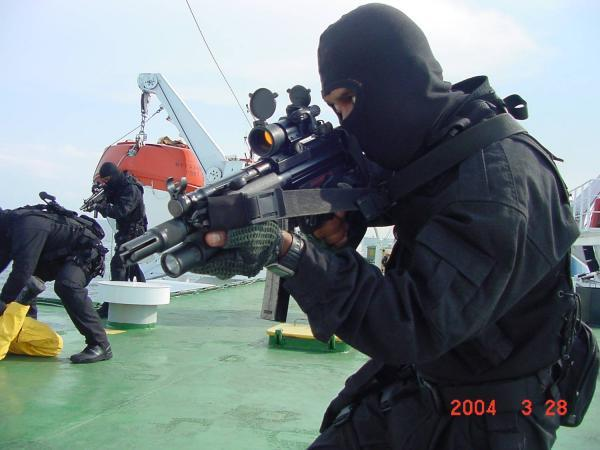
PASKAL operatives with MP5A5 submachine guns fitted with M68 Close Combat Optic, B&T flashlight handguard and Vortex muzzle suppressor practising boarding skills in MISC merchant vessel.

Following the ratification of the United Nations Convention on the Law of the Sea (UNCLOS), Malaysia was among the first nations to claim the right to extend its maritime borders beyond the previous 12 (nautical) mile limit. The new unit originally received its basic training at the Special Warfare Training Centre, Sungai Udang, Malacca by the Grup Gerak Khas.

In 1977, the first batch of trainees was split into two groups. The first group was sent to the Indonesian Marine Corps' Jungle Commando (Indonesian: Komando Hutan; Kohut) Course at Combat Training Centre (Indonesian: Pusat Latihan Tempur; Puslatpur), Selogiri, Banyuwangi, Indonesia. While the second group consisting of 30 officers, led by Captain Sutarji Kasmin (now Admiral, retired), was sent to the Marine Training Centre (Indonesian: Pusat Pendidikan Marinir; Pusdikmar), Kota Pahlawan, Surabaya, Indonesia to receive commando and jungle training delivered by Indonesian Navy KOPASKA. On their return the cadre were referred to as Navy Commandos.

To enhance and diversify their skill sets, the unit also trained in Portsmouth, United Kingdom with Royal Marines Commandos, Special Boat Service, Special Air Service and to California by US Navy SEALs. A few of the unit's members, including, Lieutenant Ismail Safaie, Lt Dya Masri Muhammad and PO Mohammad b Razak travelled on to Coronado, California and Norfolk, Virginia to receive Basic Underwater Demolition/SEAL (BUD/S) Training by the US Navy SEALs.

=== Exclusive economic zone ===
In April 1980, Malaysia declared that its EEZ reached up to 200 nautical miles from the coast as provided by the UNCLOS. This decision affected development plan as a naval fleet is directly responsible for controlling and protecting its national waters and has made Malaysia a maritime littoral nation of some 598,450 square kilometres (approximately 231,060 square miles) including some four and a half thousand kilometres of coastline and over a thousand islands.

On 1 October 1982, PASKAL was officially established as the instrument used to enforce the Malaysian EEZ. In an effort to strengthen its claim over the Spratly Islands Waters (subject to overlapping claims by multiple countries) the National Security Council of Malaysia mandated PASKAL as Maritime Counter-Terrorism operatives in 1991.

== Panglima Hitam ==
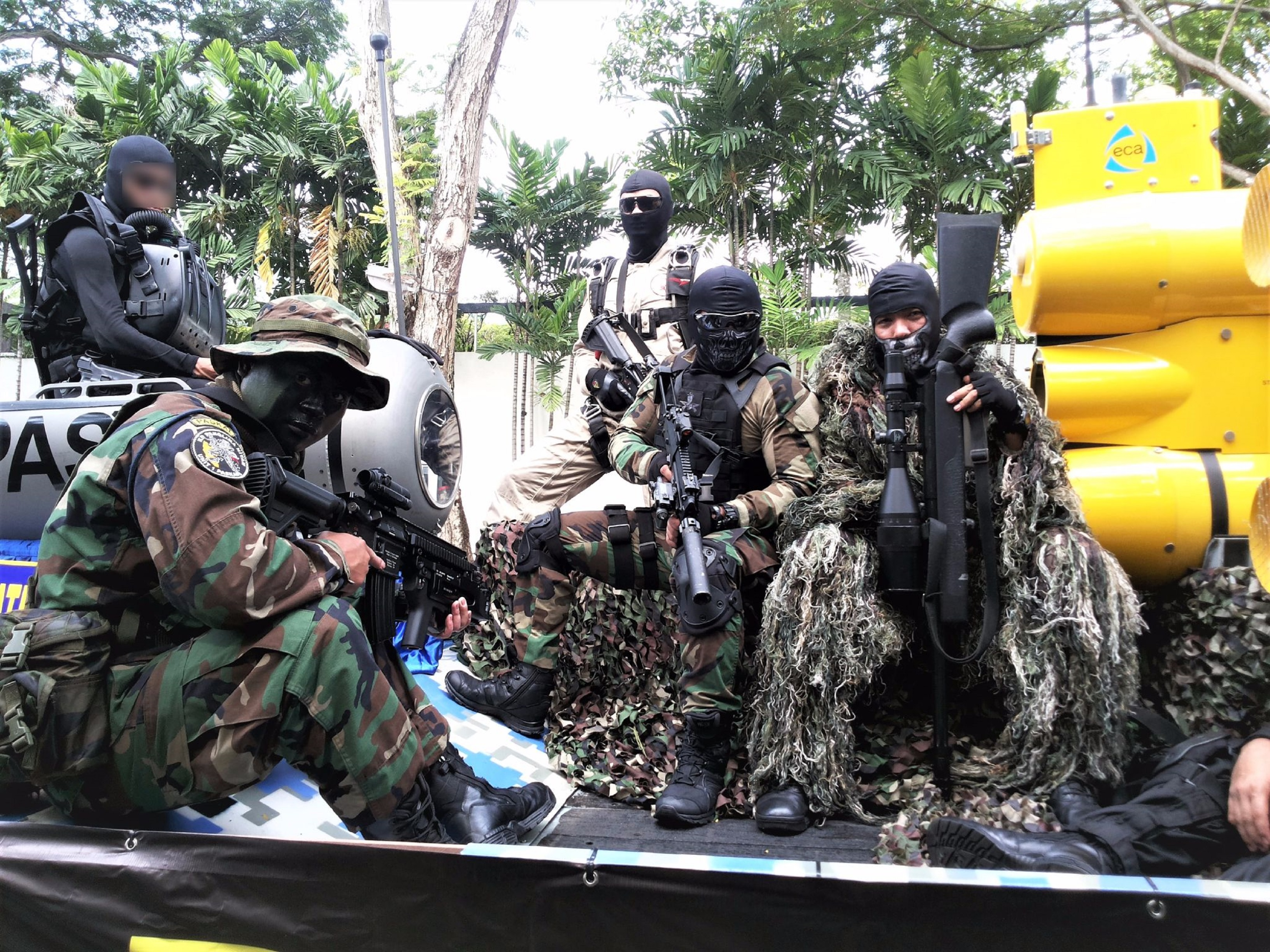
PASKAL commandos on truck armed with HK MP7A2, HK416 and Robar RC-50 during the 60th Merdeka Day in Kuala Lumpur, Malaysia.

On 15 April 2009, PASKAL Team Command (PTC) was officially named KD Panglima Hitam in a ceremony held at the Royal Malaysian Navy HQ in Lumut, Perak by the King of Malaysia, Yang di-Pertuan Agong Tuanku Mizan Zainal Abidin to honour PASKAL's service.

KD Panglima Hitam translates into English as HMS Black Knight, inspired by His Majesty Sultan of Selangor, Sultan Sharafuddin Idris Shah Al Haj ibni Al Marhum Sultan Salahuddin Abdul Aziz Shah Al Haj as an honorary Navy Captain. A total of 34 names of sultans and 56 common names have been proposed to the RMN and were chosen: KD Panglima Hitam, KD Halilintar and the KD Maharaja Lela.

Panglima Hitam is a traditional title awarded to proven warriors during the era of the various Malay Sultanates in Perak, Selangor and Johore referring to a warrior skilled in fighting tactics. The symbolism of Panglima Hitam's history and myth remains emblematic, representing strength, military prowess and strategic sense.

=== Examples ===
==== Taiping, Perak ====
During his passage with his seven brothers in Makassar, Sulawesi, Daeng Kuning settled in Kuala Larut while his brothers continued to other destinations in the Malay Archipelago. Throughout his life he wore black clothes and was more skilled in self-defense than his siblings.

==== Kuala Selangor, Selangor ====
He was bodyguard to Sultan Ibrahim, the second Sultan of Selangor and Sultan Muhammad, the third Sultan of Selangor. His body was buried beside the tombs of the kings at Malawati Hill. Before his death, he was strictly enjoined that he was buried outside the royal tomb.

==== Jugra, Selangor ====
A bodyguard during the reign of the late Sultan Abdul Samad, the fourth Sultan of Selangor. By oral stories from the elders, his true name is Daeng Ali and his tomb is located at Royal Mausoleum in Jugra.

==== Muar, Johore ====
His true name is Baginda Zahiruddin and he is from Padang Pariaman Minangkabau, Sumatera Island, Indonesia. He is the founder of Silat Lintau in Indonesia and came to Malaya in the 16th centuries. He worked with local people to eradicate and eliminate the piracy in the estuary of Sungai Muar.

==== Segamat, Johore ====
He was the military leader responsible for defeating rebel groups during the Jementah War, which occurred in the area of Segamat. His tomb is located at Jementah in Segamat, Johor.

== National special operations force ==
In 2016, the main counter-terrorism operators in Malaysia were formed into one special operations task force. Few operators from PASKAL are selected to be part of the National Special Operations Force.

== Roles and responsibilities ==
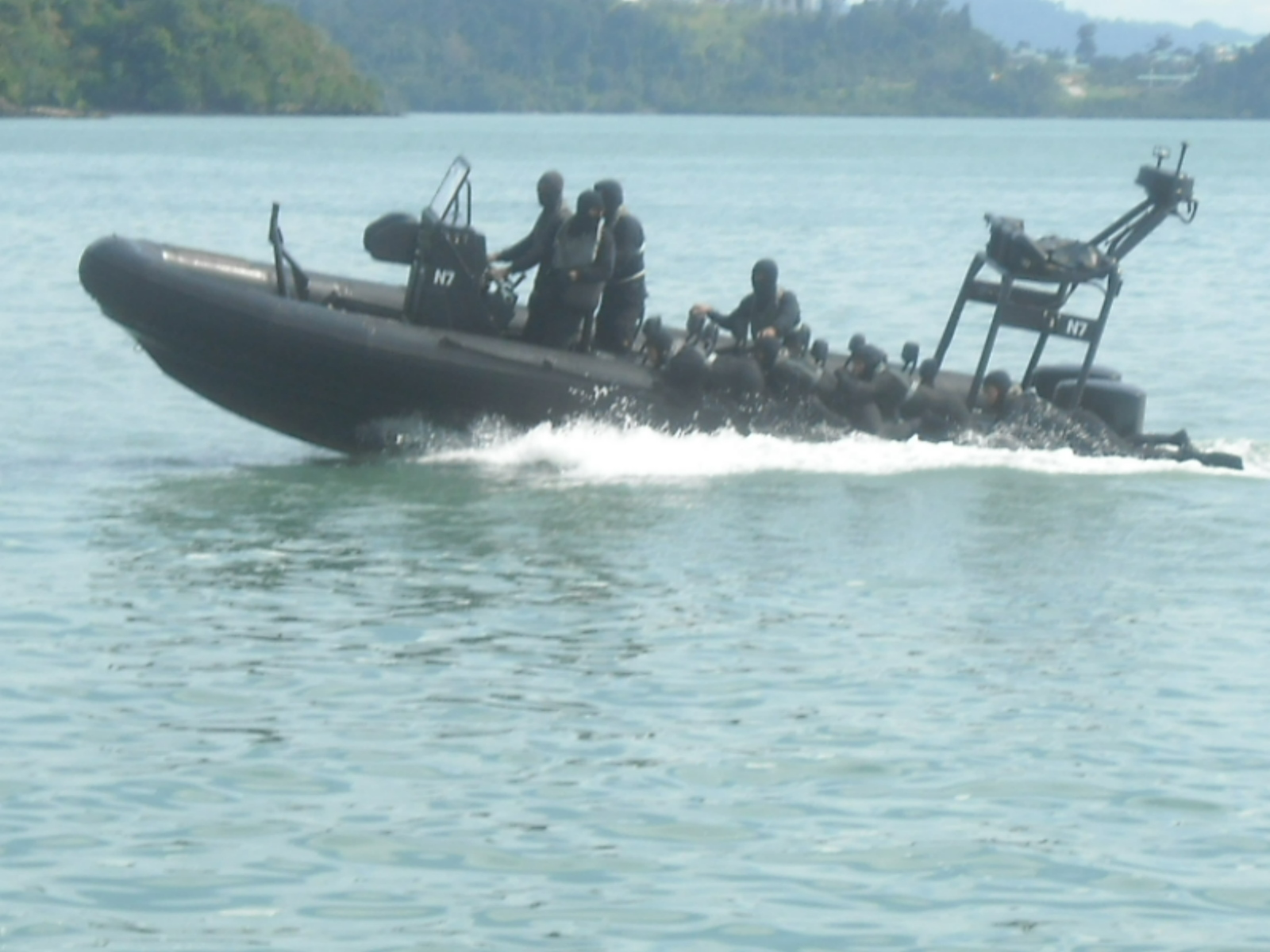
PASKAL team with RHIB.

One of PASKAL's main roles is to launch offensive operations independently via sea, land and air in enemy-controlled areas. PASKAL operatives are trained to conduct maritime operations such as anti-piracy, ship and oil rig hijacking. The security of more than thirty offshore oil rigs in Malaysian waters are PASKAL's responsibility. The unit holds regular training exercises on each rig.

Other PASKAL roles include securing beachheads, deep penetration reconnaissance raids, structure and underwater demolition and sabotage. PASKAL also handles in-harbour underwater sabotage, ship-boarding assault, Counter-Terrorist missions (CT), infiltration behind enemy lines and mine-clearing.

Special joint training with army special units is conducted regularly on specialised skills like HALO and HAHO overwater and overland parachute jumps.

PASKAL detachments are stationed on sensitive Malaysian offshore stations, particularly on the Layang-Layang atoll, while other detachments are permanently staged on RMN ships.

== Selection and training ==
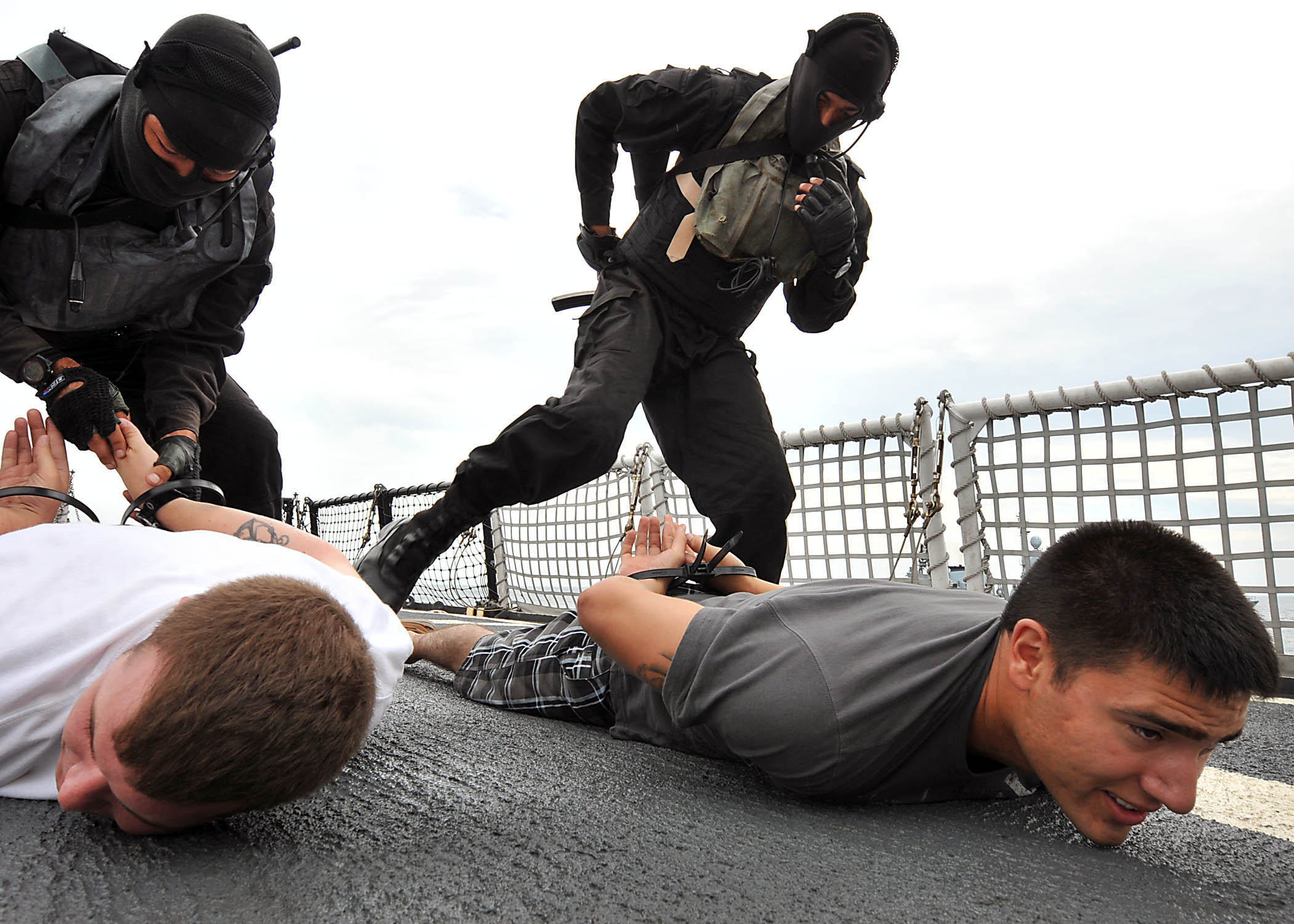
PASKAL operators search and flex-cuff 'suspects' during a boarding exercise aboard the US Coast Guard cutter (USCGC) Mellon (WHEC 717) as part of Southeast Asia Cooperation Against Terrorism (SEACAT) 2010.

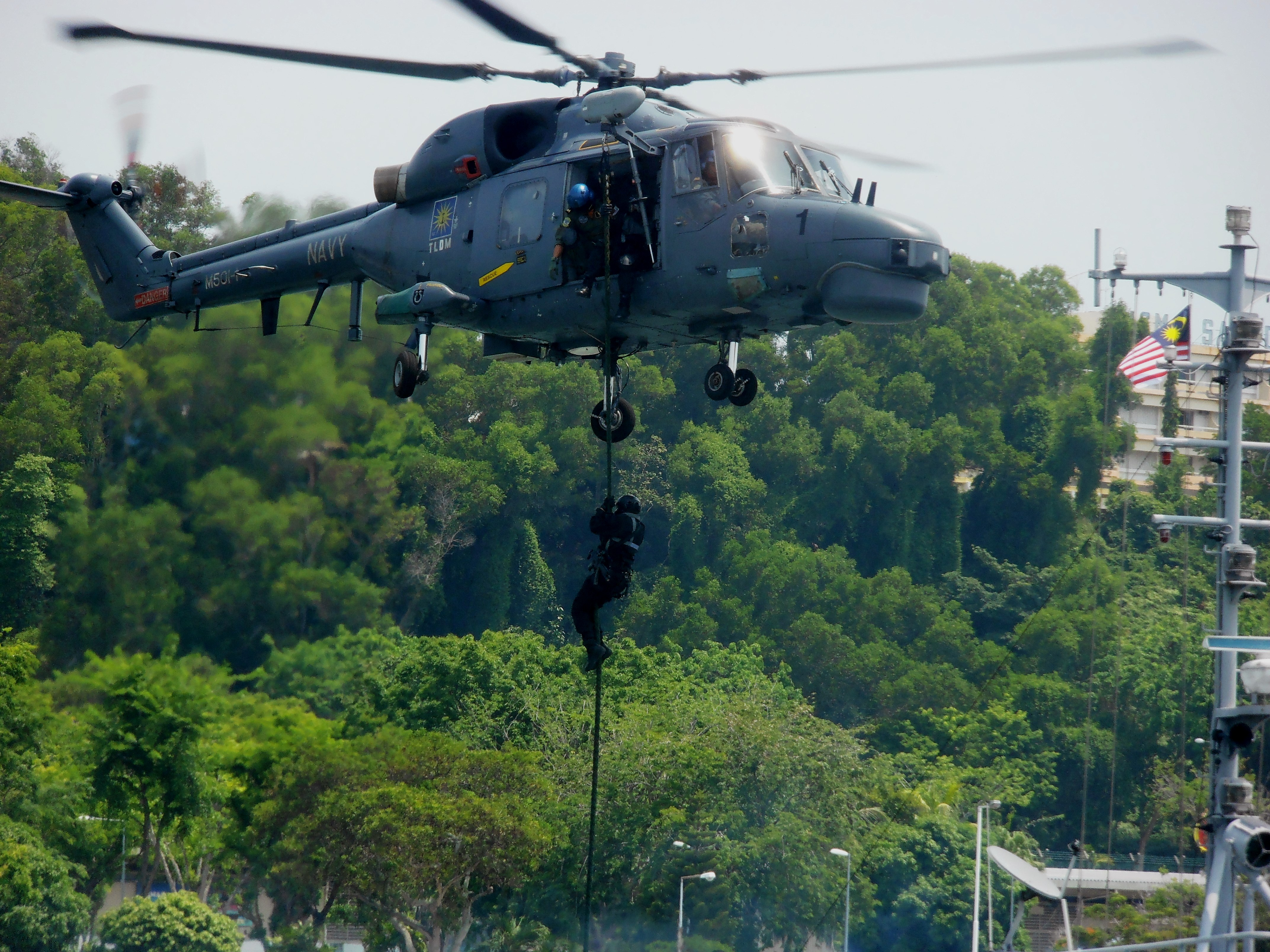
PASKAL Maritime Counter-Terrorism strike team member using the rappeling from Super Lynx helicopter while boarding Tunda Satu naval trawler during 82nd Anniversaries of Royal Malaysian Navy.

PASKAL personnel are required to be mentally and physically agile. Every new trainee undergoes three months of the Basic Commando Course at the RMN's Lumut Naval Base.

Applicants must be younger than 30 years old and healthy. They must complete and pass the Basic Commando Course before attending the Special Warfare Training Centre (SWTC; PULPAK) in Sungai Udang, Malacca to undergo basic parachute training.

Next is the Advanced First Class training where they receive training in fields such as medic, communications, explosives and electrical–mechanical repair.

They must pass a physical test every three months.

Assignment to PASKAL is conditional on passing the PASKAL Physical Screening Test (PST). Prospective trainees are expected to exceed the minimums.

Among other activities the PST consists of:

- 7.8 km running in 24 minutes (below 24 years of age)
- 1.5 km swimming in not more than 25 minutes (in a swimming pool)
- 6.4 km swimming in open sea with full mission load – under 120 minutes
- Day–night skydiving at high elevation spots i.e. hills, buildings and on ocean surface
- Freestyle swimming for 1.5 km under 31 minutes
- Surviving in water with hands and feet fully tied up (drown-proofing)
- Diving without breathing apparatus for a minimum of 7 m in depth

=== Basic recruitment ===
- Pre-selection/warm-up
- Basic PASKAL commando
- Diving endurance
- Basic sky-diving

=== Career development ===
- First class enrolment
- Underwater combat manoeuvre
- Leading rate enrolment
- Petty officer enrolment
- Diving/underwater combat superior

Members of PASKAL conduct training with Allied nation counter-terrorism units such as the Australian SAS, British SAS, US Navy SEALs, US Navy EOD, Australian Submarine Escape, Australian Clearance Diver, US Marine Corps Special Operations Training Group, etc.

On 26 August 1991, the National Security Council declared PASKAL as Malaysia's main counter-terrorist tasked for oil/gas rigs and merchant ships security. It forms one of the elements in the Quick Reaction Force (QRF).

=== Expertise–specialist course ===
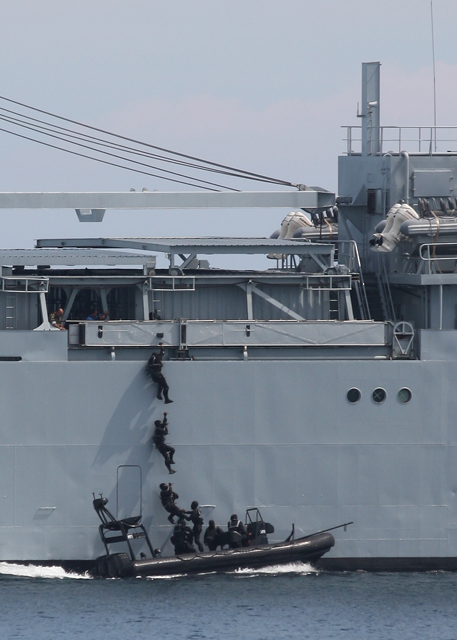
PASKAL with rappelling technique.

Insertion Techniques

- High-altitude military parachuting: Tactical, high altitude free-fall parachute insertion, employed in covert insertion into enemy territory.
- Special patrol insertion/extraction: Ability to rapidly insert and/or extract a reconnaissance patrol or assault team from enemy terrain; conduct SPIE rig of personnel from combat zone.

Combat Techniques

All PASKAL recruits receive special training and are operationally qualified to perform special operational duties. The training consists of:

- Combat tracking: Direct action missions in jungle terrain, employing guerilla tactics, night combat and dynamic counter-insurgency techniques.
- Pathfinding/Jungle survival: Ability to handle insertion to set up and operate drop zones, pick-up zones and helicopter landing sites for airborne operations, air resupply operations, or other air operations in support of the ground unit commander. Survival skills to handle emergencies, especially in tropical forest and beachheads.
- Unarmed combat: A mixture of Malay Silat and Korean Taekwondo martial arts as the main hand-to-hand combat techniques to take down the enemy at very close range.
- Close quarters combat: Tactical direct action missions, as well as visit, board, search and seizure (VBSS) operations or destruction of offshore gas, and oil platforms, employing close quarter battle combat and dynamic assault tactics and techniques.
- Sniper/Counter-sniper tactics: Direct or counter sniper in urban warfare terrain, or reconnoiter jungle warfare, reduce the enemy's fighting ability by striking at high-value targets and pinning down and demoralising the enemy, as well as provide covering fire for Malaysian or designated friendly forces from enemy attacks, as well as enemy snipers.
- Explosive ordnance disposal: Ability to defuse or detonate explosive materials, such as time bombs, unexploded ordnance (UXO), naval mines, etc.
- Combat search and rescue: Conduct search and rescue during war or peacekeeping missions that are within or near combat zones.
- Military operations on urbanized terrain: Conduct military operations in a built-up area.
- Combat medic specialist: Specialised medic for providing first aid and front line trauma care.
- Foreign language: Use of foreign languages to communicate with allied forces, etc.

Intelligence Gathering

Besides combat and insertion skills, PASKAL units are able to gather intelligence to provide guidance to commanders in support of their decisions. Intelligence capabilities include:

- Counterintelligence: Tactical counter-intelligence to prevent hostile/enemy intelligence organisations from successfully gathering and collecting intelligence.
- Signals intelligence – SIGINT: Tactical SIGINT, limited ground-based Electronic Warfare and communications security monitoring and analysis in direct support. This is accomplished by employing organic collection and direction finding equipment as well as through connectivity to national and theatre SIGINT/EW assets.
- C4-I (communications, command, control, co-ordination, intelligence) Systems Implementations: Tactical C4-I techniques to provide intelligence to command centre. The objective is a thorough understanding of mutual command and control procedures, capabilities, and limitations developed through continual participation in joint and combined exercises.
- Special reconnaissance: Reconnaissance behind enemy lines, avoiding direct combat and detection by the enemy.
- Long-range reconnaissance patrol: Use of four to six-man teams on reconnaissance and combat patrols, either obtaining intelligence, or performing raids and ambushes.

PASKAL tactics and organisation are heavily influenced by the British Special Boat Service (SBS) and the United States Naval Special Warfare Development Group (SEAL Team Six – DEVGRU). PASKAL usually trains with GGK as well as US Navy SEALs, Indonesian Navy KOPASKA and the SBS.

== Teams and structure ==
=== Naval Special Operations Unit ===
The manpower details of this unit are highly classified and it is believed to be a regiment divided into two operation regiments tasked to support PASKAL operations. Specialist tactical teams of PASKAL consist – KD PANGLIMA HITAM, PASKAL Unit Satu (PASKAL – Unit 1) based in the Lumut Naval Base in Perak on Peninsular Malaysia, and PASKAL Unit Dua (PASKAL – Unit 2) based at KD SRI SEMPORNA, a Naval Base in Semporna, Sabah. A company-strength (detachment) is based at Teluk Sepanggar Naval Base near Kota Kinabalu, Sabah with each naval base having a regiment sized unit to support PASKAL operations in jungle warfare, amphibious assaults, ship boarding (VBSS) and defending military ports.

=== Structure ===
PASKAL organises itself operationally into squadrons of at least four companies (or platoons) each. Each company is in turn organised roughly along the lines of the US Green Berets' structure of Alpha, Bravo, Charlie and Delta Squadron. The smallest PASKAL unit is the Boat Troop, with seven men. Each PASKAL company consists of:

Alpha Squadron
The Versatile Special Operations Force, mainly trained for Maritime Counter-terrorism and other rescue operations into cargo vessels and oil rigs as well as urban terrain. This platoon is equipped with individual covering systems for close quarters combat.

Bravo Squadron
An oxygen combat diving team and a special air operations team, both of which allow quiet infiltration of enemy territory. This squad is also trained to collect intelligence data to help the assault squad.

Charlie Squadron
An auxiliary team with the role of strengthening special operations capacity from behind enemy lines.

Delta Squadron
The conventional warfare team that dominated the amphibious warfare of PASKAL teams with special operation skills on the ground and sniping.

Each squadron contains a mixture of specialists that is adjusted for the specifics of the mission or area where it is tasked to operate. Each squadron normally carries a Combat Intelligence Team (Malay: Tim Risik Gempur, TRG), trained in maritime tactical intelligence, counter-intelligence and psychological operations.

== Identities ==
Reddish purple (magenta) coloured beret
The magenta beret reflects PASKAL's identity and its close relationship with the Indonesian Marine Corps.

Navy blue lanyard
The navy blue lanyard reflects the Royal Malaysian Navy and possibly reflects their founding trainers, the British Royal Marines Commando.

Camouflage
The PASKAL camouflage uniform is identical to that worn by US Navy SEALs. It reflects the close relationship with this US Special Forces unit from which PASKAL receives training.

Trimedia
The "Trimedia" is PASKAL's main emblem which is worn by every PASKAL operatives. The "Trimedia" term comes from the combination of the English word "Tri" which means "Three" and Malay word "Media" which means "Medium". In other words, Trimedia means the ability of operating in three mediums; Land, Air (Parachute) and Underwater.
The various components symbolises:
- Wing – the traditional symbol for airborne capability
- Jet Fin & Diving Mask Emblem – symbolises underwater infiltration capability
- Combat Dagger – symbolises ground warfare capability
- Anchor – the symbol for the Royal Malaysian Navy (RMN).

PASKAL shoulder tab
PASKAL operatives wear shoulder tab embroidered with "PASKAL" on the right shoulder sleeve. The shoulder tabs are synonymous with elite forces in Malaysian Armed Force.

== Equipment ==
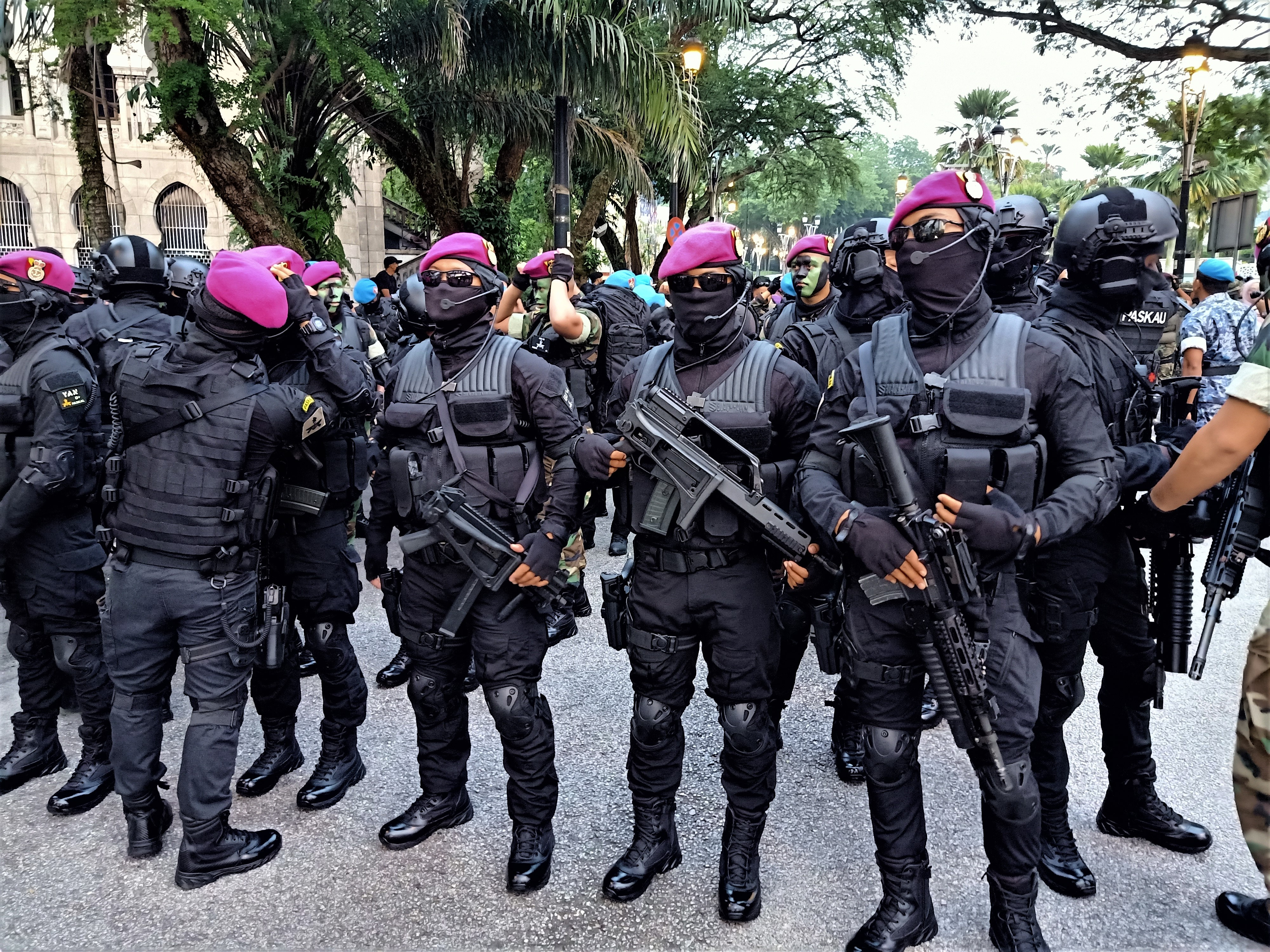
Operatives of PASKAL on standby during the 65th Merdeka Day at Kuala Lumpur, Malaysia. They're holding the HK UMP45 submachine gun, HK G36K and Colt M4A1 SOPMOD rifles.

The weaponry and equipment inventory is a confidential subject. PASKAL teams use equipment designed for a variety of specialist situations including close quarters combat (CQC), urban warfare, hostile maritime interdiction (VBSS/GOPLATS), long range target interdiction, jungle warfare and special reconnaissance. Nevertheless, amid rumours of financing from the consortium of oil and shipping companies in addition to ample financing from the navy, PASKAL's inventory currently includes some of the world's most advanced and sophisticated equipment.

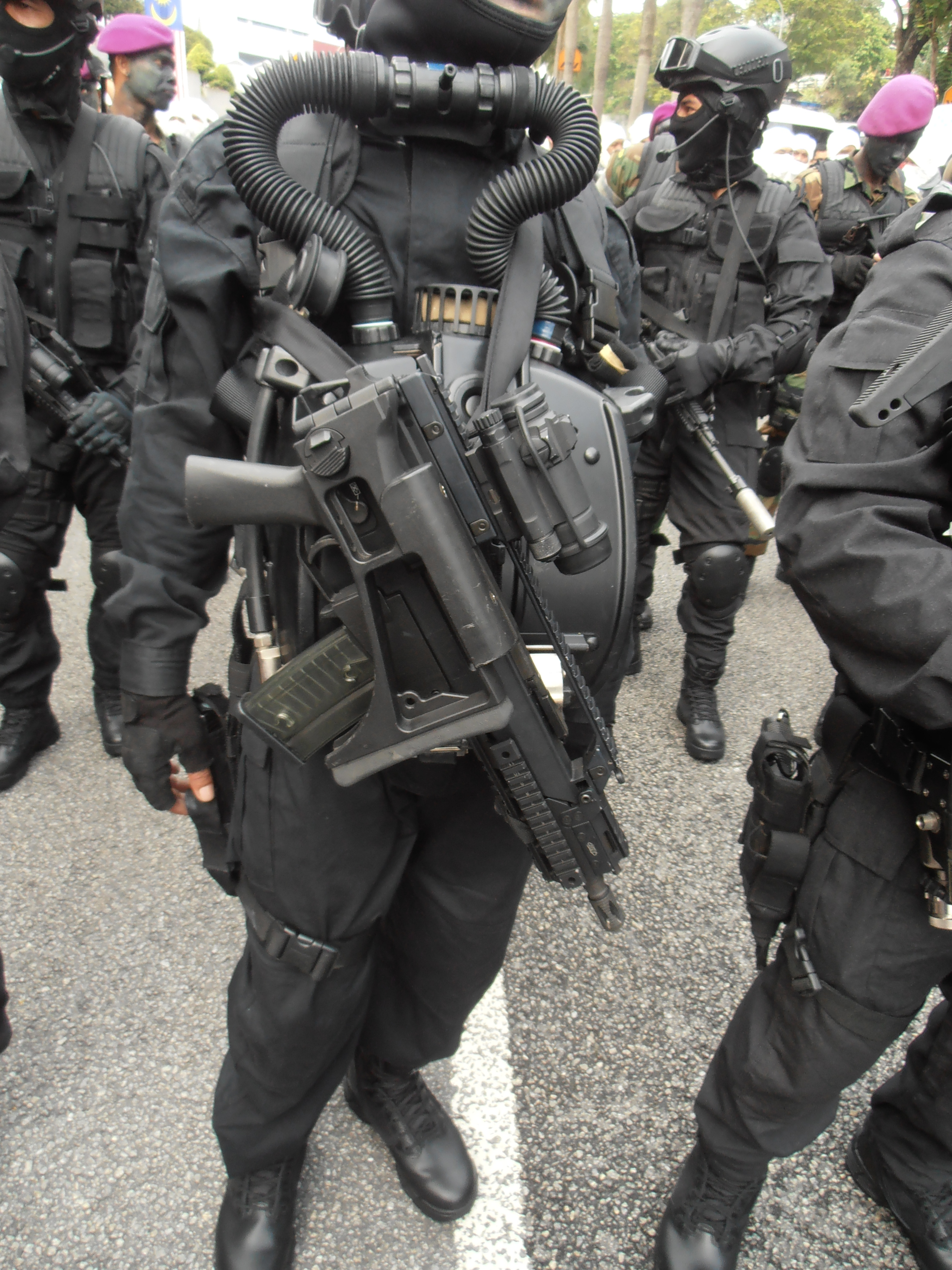
HK G36C carbine belonging to PASKAL for urban and VBSS operations.

Voluntary contributions from the oil consortium and shipping companies ensures that PASKAL has sufficient means to procure specialised weapons and equipment including heavy body armour, ballistic shields, entry tools, tactical vehicles, advanced night vision optics, and motion detectors that are much more modern and sophisticated in comparison to the other special forces units in the Malaysian armed forces. All the weaponry and equipment was acquired under the Offensive Underwater Weapons program implemented under the 9th Malaysian Plans.

=== Uniforms ===
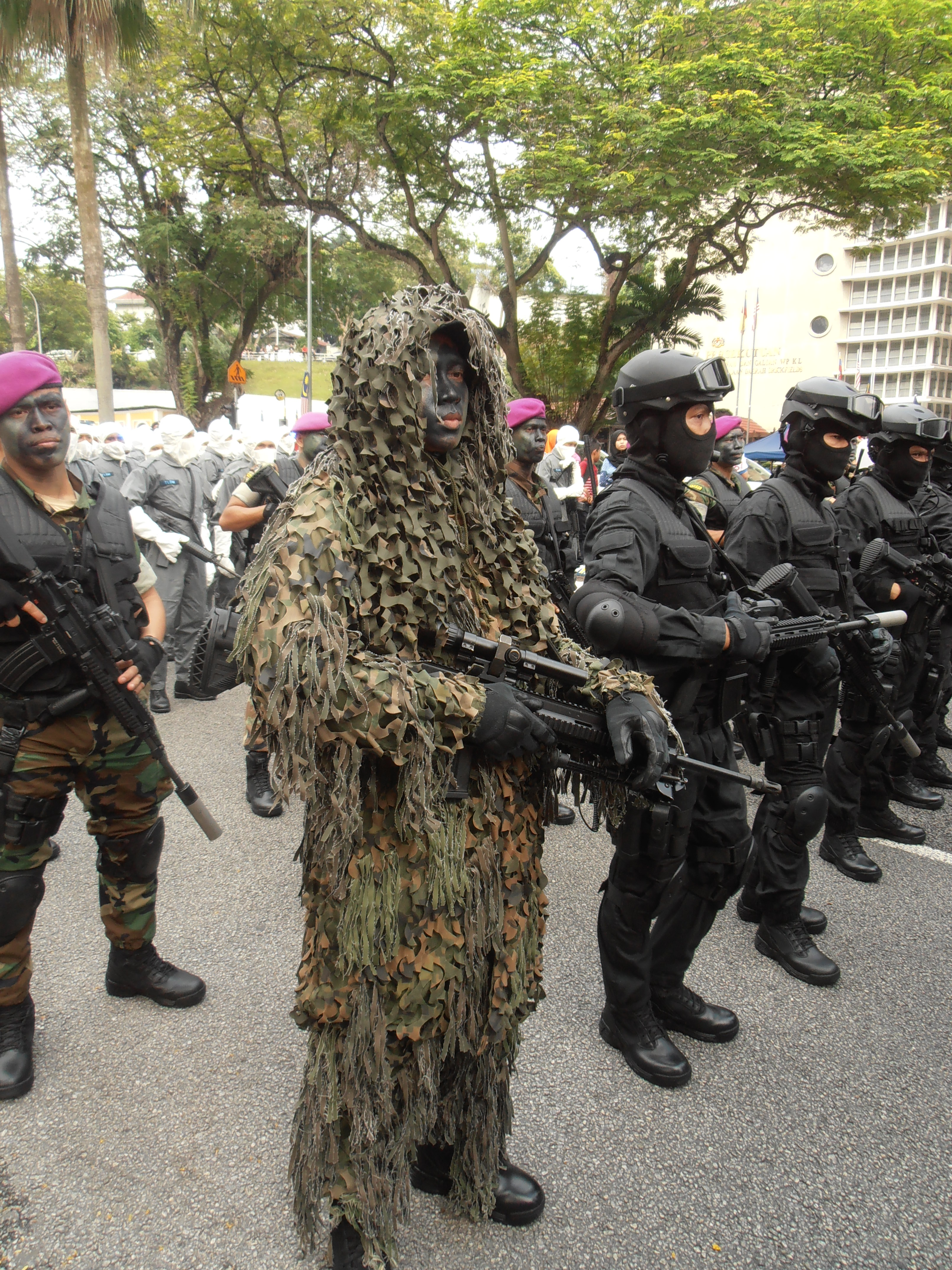
PASKAL marksman in a Ghillie suit armed with a HK417 rifle, equipped with a Marksman Short Dot Riflescope.

PASKAL personnel wear similar utility uniforms to the tactical uniforms worn by the military. Many armed forces diverged from the original standard black or blue uniforms, and PASKAL uniforms now include US Woodland camouflage patterns identical to that worn by SEALs.

Originally PASKAL units were equipped with balaclavas and M40 Field Protective Mask, or even PRO-TEC fiberglass baseball helmets. Modern PASKAL units commonly use the lightweight FAST helmets. Fire retardant balaclavas are often used to protect the face, as well as to protect the identity of team members. Ballistic vests, sometimes including rigid plate inserts, are standard issue.

==== Helmets ====
Name	Type	Origin	Notes
Future Assault Shell Technology	Tactical helmet		
Lightweight FAST	Baseball caps		

==== Night-vision devices ====
Name	Type	Origin	Notes
AN/PVS-7	Night vision sight	(United States)	
AN/PVS-14	Night vision sight	(United States)	
AN/PVS-21	Night vision sight	(United States)	

==== Accessories ====
Name	Type	Origin	Notes
Advanced Combat Optical Gunsight (ACOG)	Accessories	(United States)	Recently renamed Rifle Combat Optic (RCO).
Aimpoint M68 Close Combat Optic (CCO) red dot reflex sight	Accessories	(Sweden)	US military designated of Aimpoint CompM2. Attached to family of MP5, MP7 and M4A1 rifles.
Aimpoint M68 Collimated Combat Optic	Accessories	(United States)	US Army's newest version of Aimpoint CompM4. Attached to HK416, G36, MP7, UMP45 and XM8.
Brügger & Thomet suppressors	Accessories	(Switzerland)	Attached to HK416, G36, XM8.
Oerlikon Contraves LLM01	Accessories	(Germany)	Attached to HK416.

==== Thermal imaging common modules ====
Name	Type	Origin	Notes
AN/PAS-13	Thermal sight	(United States)	

==== Various ground tactical ====
Name	Type	Origin	Notes
Radar MASINT	Measurement and Signature Intelligence		Including PSR MASINT.

=== Weaponry ===
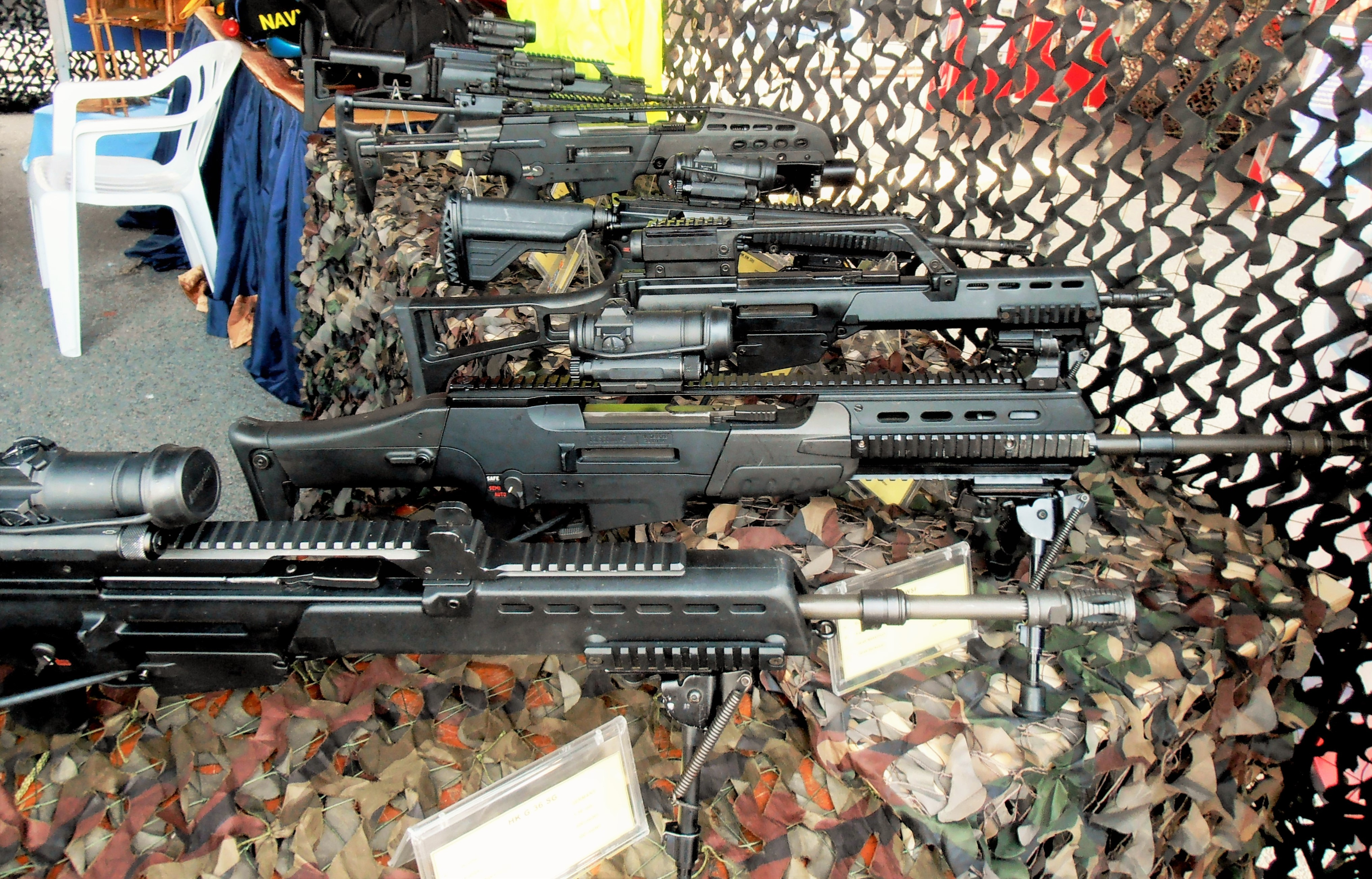
H&K weapons of PASKAL on display.

PASKAL teams employ a variety of weapons, the most common weapons include shotguns, submachine guns, assault rifles, machineguns, sniper rifles and grenade launchers. Currently, they usually operate American and German-made weaponry, but in the Langkawi Airshow (LIMA 2015) maritime warfare, they used Heckler & Koch weapons, including the HK UMP45 submachine gun, HK416, G36 and a lightweight XM8 assault rifle. Pictures taken during national day parades including RMN anniversaries as well as LIMA and from local defence magazines indicate the use of the following:

==== Bladed weapons ====
Name	Type	Origin	Notes
M7 bayonet	Bladed weapon	(United States)	
M9 bayonet	Bladed weapon	(United States)	
Aitor Jungle King	Bladed weapon	(Spain)	

==== Sidearms ====
Name	Type	Origin	Notes
Glock 17	Semi-automatic pistol	(Austria)	Standard issue for RMN personnel. Being supplemented with Glock 18C.
Heckler & Koch HK45	Semi-automatic pistol	(Germany)	HK45 Compact Tactical.
Heckler & Koch Mark 23	Semi-automatic pistol	(Germany)	Mk.23 Mod 0.
Heckler & Koch P9S	Semi-automatic pistol	(Germany)	
Heckler & Koch P11	Underwater pistol	(Germany)	Underwater pistol.
Heckler & Koch P30	Semi-automatic pistol	(Germany)	
Vektor SP1	Semi-automatic pistol	(South Africa)	

==== Shotguns ====
Name	Type	Origin	Notes
Remington 870	Shotgun	(United States)	18.5mm Marine Magnums – as the M870 and Modular Combat Shotgun. Can be used in the close range combat or as a breaching gun.
Remington 1100	Shotgun	(United States)	18.5mm Tacticals – semi automatic 12-gauge shotgun.
Heckler & Koch FABARM FP6	Shotgun	(Germany)	A 12-gauge pump-action combat shotgun.

==== Submachine guns ====
Name	Type	Origin	Notes
FN P90	Submachine gun	(Belgium)	A high power submachine gun used by PASKAL and is capable of penetrating the CRISAT vest at a range of 200 m (219 yd), or a Level IIIA Kevlar vest at the same range.
Heckler & Koch MP5	Submachine gun	(Germany)	A standard MP5 has been fitted with a RM Equipment M203PI grenade launcher.
Heckler & Koch MP7	Submachine gun	(Germany)	A personal defence weapon (PDW) known to be used by PASKAL operators when missions require a very compact and potent weapon, especially for close protection.
Heckler & Koch UMP	Submachine gun	(Germany)	.45 ACP.

==== Tactical rifles and Carbines ====
Name	Type	Origin	Notes
Colt M16A1	Tactical rifle / Carbine	(United States)	With 20-rounds Colt-manufactured STANAG magazines, 100-rounds Beta C-Mag drum magazines). Former primary arm of PASKAL. Replaced by the M4A1, HK416, G36 and others. Still in use with other PASKAL teams as well as some support personnel and ceremonial use only.
Colt M4A1 Carbines	Tactical rifle / Carbine	(United States)	Carbine-length variant of the M16A2 with collapsible stock as the Malaysian Armed Forces standard rifle. Fitted with Special Operations Peculiar Modification (SOPMOD) Block I kit.
Heckler & Koch G36	Tactical rifle / Carbine	(Germany)	G36C, G36E and G36KE carbines in use.
Heckler & Koch HK416	Tactical rifle / Carbine	(Germany)	The primary rifle used by PASKAL. Attached with Aimpoint CompM4S, Brügger & Thomet suppressor and Oerlikon Contraves LLM01 laser light module.
Heckler & Koch XM8	Tactical rifle / Carbine	(Germany)	A former OICW program candidate based on the G36, handed over to PASKAL to reduce the over-reliance on the M4A1 rifles.
AK-102	Carbine	(Russia)	Limited use in the early 2000's

==== Anti-materiel rifles ====
Name	Type	Origin	Notes
Accuracy International AW50	Anti-materiel rifle	(United Kingdom)	Anti-materiel bolt-action rifle chambered in .50 BMG (12.7×99mm NATO).
Armalite AR-50	Anti-materiel rifle	(United States)	
Robar RC-50	Anti-materiel rifle	(United States)	In use as response to requirements issued for an anti-materiel rifle.
DSR-Precision GmbH DSR-50	Anti-materiel rifle	(Germany)	

==== Designated marksman rifles ====
Name	Type	Origin	Notes
Heckler & Koch HK417	Designated marksman rifle	(Germany)	7.62x51mm version of the HK416 rifle.
Heckler & Koch MSG-90	Designated marksman rifle	(Germany)	MSG90A1 variant in use.

==== Sniper rifles ====
Name	Type	Origin	Notes
Accuracy International Arctic Warfare	Sniper rifle	(United Kingdom)	
DSR-Precision GmbH DSR-1	Sniper rifle	(Germany)	.308 Winchester subsonic bullpup sniper rifles.
M14 rifle	Sniper rifle	(United States)	In use as sniper rifles. Select fire capability is retained.
M40 rifle	Sniper rifle	(United States)	In use as sniper rifles.

==== Machine guns ====
Name	Type	Origin	Notes
CETME Ameli	Machine gun	(Spain)	
Heckler & Koch MG4	Machine gun	(Germany)	5.56mm belt-fedmachine gun, being issued as a replacement for the Minimi.
FN Minimi	Machine gun	(Belgium)	5.56×45mm light machine gun, being phased out in favour of the HK MG4.
FN MAG	Machine gun	(Belgium)	7.62×51mm medium machine gun used primarily on vessels and helicopters.
Vektor SS-77 GPMG	Machine gun	(South Africa)	7.62×51mm medium machine gun used primarily on lighter vessels and helicopters.

==== Hand grenades ====
Name	Type	Origin	Notes
M67 Hand Grenade (Fragmentation)	Fragmentation grenade	(United States)	
AN-M14 Hand Grenade (Incendiary)	Incendiary grenade	(United States)	
Mk 141 Mod 0 Hand Grenade "flash-bang"	Stun grenade	(United States)	
AN-M18 Smoke grenade	Smoke grenade	(United States)	

==== Grenade launchers ====
Name	Type	Origin	Notes
M203A1/A2 40 mm Rifle-Mounted Grenade Launcher	Grenade launcher	(United States)	
Heckler & Koch AG36	Grenade launcher	(Germany)	A single-shot 40mm underbarrel grenade launcher, fitted with HK416, G36 and XM8 rifles.
Heckler & Koch GMG 40 mm Automatic Grenade Launcher	Grenade launcher	(Germany)	
Heckler & Koch M320 40 mm Grenade Launcher Module	Grenade launcher	(Germany)	

==== Others ====
Name	Type	Origin	Notes
M18A1 Claymore anti-personnel mine	Mine	(United States)	
Sutarji Underwater Gun	Grenade launcher	(Malaysia)	Sutarji Underwater Gun – a grappling hook launcher specialised to catch ship rigging so that it could be boarded.

=== Vehicles ===
PASKAL utilises specialised delivery craft – among others, PASKAL employs high speed inflatable/collapsible subskimmers (also known as UDV – Underwater Delivery Vehicle or Diver Propulsion Device - DPD), for infiltrations into hostile areas.

The acquisition of two Scorpène-class submarines which are jointly being built by DCNS, France and Navantia, Spain (KD Tunku Abdul Rahman commissioning January 2009, KD Tun Razak commissioning October 2008) is expected to further add PASKAL's capabilities and range.

== Commanding officers ==
PASKAL Commanders
Name	Year	Remark
First Admiral Assoc. Prof. Dr. Haji Sutarji bin Kasmin	1975–2003	Founding father of PASKAL
Vice Admiral Dato' Haji Nasaruddin bin Othman	2003–2015	
First Admiral Dato' Saifudin bin Kamarudin	2015	
First Admiral Jamaludin bin Mohd Saman	18 December 2015 – 19 June 2017	
First Admiral Anuar bin Alias, PGB	20 June 2017–21 February 2021	The first and only Panglima Gagah Berani (PGB) Medal recipient from Royal Malaysian Navy
First Admiral Mohd Redzuan Haji Taib	22 February 2021 - now	

== Notable PASKAL members ==
- Commodore Assoc. Prof. Dr. Haji Sutarji Kasmin (now Admiral, retired) — first commanding officer of PASKAL, considered godfather of PASKAL
- Vice Admiral Dato' Haji Nasaruddin Bin Othman (retired) — second commanding officer of PASKAL, replacing First Admiral Dr. Haji Sutarji Kasmin
- First Admiral Dato'Hj Saifudin Bin Kamarudin
- FA Dato'Hj Jamaludin Bin Mohd Saman (retired)
- Captain Hj Ismail Bin Safaii (late)
- Capt Hj Abd Malek Bin Hj Mohd Daud
- First Admiral (retired) Anuar Alias — recipient of Panglima Gagah Berani medal
- Commander George Paul Thomas Rozario
- Lieutenant Commander Che Adnan Bin Mat Isa (retired, now Maritime Captain of MMEA)
- Lieutenant Commander Fadzir Bin Talib (late)
- Lieutenant Commander (Honorary) 806879 Ahmad Ramli Bin Kardi — recipient of Ahli Mangku Negara and Ahli Mahkota Perak medal. One of the first Malaysian to perform free-fall parachute jump at North Pole and South Pole
- Lieutenant Commander Samrus Bin Che Dan (died 18 June 2012)
- 1st Warrant Office (MCPO) Hj Mustapa Bin Hj Alwi, AMN, PJK, Recipient of Bintara Angkatan Tentera 1987 (BAT) (retired) demised October 25, 2022
- Master Chief Petty Officer Mohd Room Bin Bahari (retired)
- Chief Petty Officer 814726 Mohd Idros Bin Mohd Yusof

== Operations and covert actions ==
PASKAL units has been deployed in the following operations:

Operation	Roles	Country	Year
Spratly Islands	Security Mission	Malaysia	1980s
Gugusan Semarang Peninjau	Security Missions	Malaysia	1979
United Nations Operation in Somalia II (UNOSOM II)	Peacekeeping Missions	Somalia	1993–1995
United Nations Angola Verification Mission II (UNIVEM II)	Peacekeeping Missions	Angola	1998
Operation Astute	Peacekeeping Missions	Timor-Leste	2006
United Nations Interim Force in Lebanon (MALCON-UNIFIL)	Peacekeeping Missions	Lebanon	2007
United Nations Interim Force in Lebanon II (MALCON-UNIFIL II)	Peacekeeping Missions	Lebanon	2008 – present
Operation Dawn	Hostage Rescue	Somalia	2008 – 2011
International Security Assistance Force (MALCON-ISAF)	Humanitarian aid	Afghanistan	2010 – 2013

=== Operation Dawn (Ops Fajar) ===
PASKAL operatives were deployed subsequent to the hijacking by Somali pirates of two Malaysian merchant vessels, MISC-owned Bunga Melati 2 and Bunga Melati 5. The PASKAL detachment was tasked for intelligence-gathering and also to provide security to the Malaysian team negotiating the release of both ships and their crew. This operation, codenamed Ops Fajar (Operation Dawn) also involved Royal Malaysian Navy assets comprising KD Lekiu, KD Sri Inderapura, as well as supported elements of Malaysian Army special forces, Grup Gerak Khas as well as some RMAF assets.

=== Rescue operations of Zhenhua 4 ===
18 December 2008 – The Royal Malaysian Navy rescued a Chinese-registered ship, Zhenhua 4 in the Gulf of Aden on Wednesday, the same day the United Nations Security Council decided to be more assertive against the Somali pirates. The Zhenhua 4 was attacked by nine armed pirates about noon on Wednesday while on its way from Djibouti to China.

Called on by the Combined Task Force 150 (CTF-150), the multinational coalition patrolling the pirate-infested gulf, the RMN's KD Sri Inderasakti dispatched a helicopter (including PASKAL naval commandos) to the scene. The helicopter fired two warning shots at the pirates' skiff, causing them to call off the attack on the heavy load carrier Zhenhua 4 and flee.

=== Rescue operation of MV Abul Kalam Azad ===
1 January 2009 – PASKAL operatives together with RMN KD Sri Indera Sakti, commanded by Captain Mohamad Adib Abdul Samad experienced its first combat in the new year when its Fennec helicopter drove off two pirate skiffs pursuing Indian-registered crude oil tanker MT Abul Kalam Azad in the Gulf of Aden. The 92,000-tonne vessel, with 40 crew members, was heading for the Suez Canal with a full load of crude oil, sailing in the gulf at 11.37am (Malaysian time) when it was attacked by pirates in two skiffs. One of the boats had seven men in it, all armed with AK-47s and machineguns. They unleashed a barrage of fire at the bridge and accommodation area of the ship. They also tried to board it, all the while keeping up the attack.

However, the ship began taking evasive measures and increased speed to the maximum. This was also when it issued a distress signal, which was picked up by Malaysian navy support ship KD Sri Indera Sakti about 15 nautical miles away. In rapid response, Captain Mohamad Adib dispatched the ship-borne Fennec helicopter gunship armed with twin general purpose machine guns and an elite Naval Special Forces PASKAL airborne sniper. The Malaysian helicopter was joined by a Eurocopter AS 365 Dauphin helicopter of the Royal Saudi Navy, effectively scaring off the pirates.

The captain of the Abul Kalam Azad had initially requested to join the Malaysian International Shipping Corporation convoy, escorted by the Sri Indera Sakti, but later accepted the offer from a Saudi Arabian naval ship to escort it to its destination. International Maritime Bureau Piracy Reporting Centre head Noel Choong said the crew of the Abul Kalam Azad reported seeing the pirates in military-style garb.

=== MALCON – ISAF ===
Special forces including PASKAL, Grup Gerak Khas, PASKAU and the 10th Paratrooper Brigade were deployed along other Malaysian contingent troops to participate in the administrative workload at the International Security Assistance Force (ISAF) in Afghanistan. Teams were deployed to assist the New Zealand Armed Forces in the peacekeeping missions and humanitarian aid at Bamiyan District, Afghanistan.

=== Operation Dawn 8: Gulf of Aden ===
20 January 2011 – PASKAL maritime counter-terrorism assault teams successfully thwarted an attempted hijacking by Somali pirates on the Malaysian chemical tanker, MT Bunga Laurel in the Gulf of Aden. The tanker, laden with lubricating oil and ethylene dichloride was headed for Singapore when attacked by a pirate mothership with 18 armed pirates about 300 nautical miles (555 km) east of Oman at 11.40pm. Under the cover of darkness, seven pirates armed with AK-47 assault rifles, light machine guns and pistols suddenly emerged from a skiff boat and began boarding the tanker, firing at random. The crew of MT Bunga Laurel activated the alarm and MISC Emergency Reporting Centre (ERC) received a security emergency indication at about 11.37pm. With the issue of an order to rescue, the PASKALs in two boats, led by Lieutenant Commander Mohd Maznan Bin Mohd Said and Lieutenant Noor Asri Bin Roslan, were deployed at 1.20 am from KA Bunga Mas Lima auxiliary ship, located 14 nautical miles (25.9 km) away, and provided with reconnaissance and aerial cover by a Fennec attack helicopter piloted by Lieutenant Jason Solomon John.

The PASKALs boarded the tanker and subdued the pirates who engaged in a gunfight with the commandos, while the helicopter fired on the pirates' mother ship. At least three pirates were wounded in the shootout on board the MT Bunga Laurel and further four captured, while 11 more pirates on the mothership decided to surrender. A cache of weapons and ammunition was seized. The 23 member Bunga Laurel crew consisting of Filipinos and Malaysians was successfully rescued with no casualties, and with no losses to the PASKALs in the battle. The swift action prevented the MISC from losing the cargo worth an estimated RM30 million. The KA Bunga Mas Lima had just completed the task of escorting the tanker and another MISC liquefied natural gas carrier, MT Seri Balhaf, bound for Fujairah, to a safe zone called Easton 4 in the gulf. Malaysian Prime Minister Najib Razak praised the team for their efficiency in dealing with the crisis; the captured pirates were eventually brought to Malaysia to be tried.

=== Lahad Datu conflict ===
PASKAL units were sent to Lahad Datu, Sabah as part of the Malaysian security forces team to secure the area. The units, alongside GGK, PASKAU, PGK and UNGERIN play main roles in tracking down and neutralising the Southern Filipino terrorist group.

=== MT Orkim Harmony hijacking ===
On 11 June 2015, eight Indonesian pirates hijacked the MT Orkim Harmony, a Malaysian tanker at 8:54 p.m. MST (UTC+08:00) during its way from Malacca to Kuantan Port in the waters of Tanjung Sedili, Kota Tinggi, Johor at 2°8.90′N 104°27.30′E. During the hijacking, a crew of 22 was on board the tanker, including 16 Malaysians, five Indonesians and one Myanmar national. The tanker was loaded with 6,000 metric tonnes of petrol worth around 21 million ringgit (US$5.6 million). All the eight hijackers were armed with pistols and parangs. On 17 June, an Australian air force Lockheed AP-3C Orion reconnaissance plane, flying from its base in Malaysia's northern Penang state, spotted the missing tanker in the Gulf of Thailand within the Cambodian-Vietnamese maritime border. According to them, the tanker had been repainted from blue to black and renamed Kim Harmon. Malaysian authorities co-operate with an authorities of Vietnam, Indonesia and Thailand to track and intercept the tanker in Cambodian waters. In reaction to the Australian report, RMN and MMEA vessels, who were put on standby, and Navy counter-terrorism forces PASKAL were deployed to the area and, on 19 June, the tanker was spotted at 9°10′N 103°10′E. (Note: The reference is on the external links.) The pirates on board the tanker instructed them to retreat for about five nautical miles (9 kilometres) from the tanker located and threatened to kill the crew's families if the tanker's captain leaked the pirates plan to leave the tanker to the Malaysian authorities. Some hours later, eight Indonesians who were suspected as the pirates were seen near Thổ Chu Island and as they were approached by the Vietnam Border Defense Force (VBDF) and VCG, the Indonesians claimed they were from a fishing boat that sank.

== In popular culture ==
Books, televisions and movie.

- 2018: "PASKAL The Movie – 2018 Malaysian action film", an action movie based on a true story about missions of UNIVEM II and Operations Dawn 8 in Gulf of Aden.
- 2019: "PASKAL 24 Jam", a TV reality show by Astro Gempak about the seven actors and social media celebrities joining the challenge to feel the real experience of training in the PASKAL camp non-stop for 24 hours with KD Panglima Hitam.

== See also ==
- Elite Forces of Malaysia
  - Malaysian Army 21st Grup Gerak Khas
  - Malaysian Army 10th Parachute Brigade
  - Royal Malaysian Air Force PASKAU
  - Malaysia Coast Guard Special Task and Rescue
  - Royal Malaysia Police Pasukan Gerakan Khas
