= Sutarji Kasmin =

First Admiral (Retired) Sutarji Kasmin JSM SMS KMN AMS BSD

Personal details
- Born: 5 November 1951 (age 74) Selangor, Federation of Malaya
- Awards: Order of the Defender of the Realm - Officer (KMN); Order of Loyalty to the Crown of Malaysia - Companion (JSM)

Military service
- Allegiance: Malaysia
- Branch/service: Royal Malaysian Navy
- Years of service: 1970–2005
- Rank: First Admiral
- Unit: PASKAL
- Commands: PASKAL Commander

Sutarji bin Kasmin (born 5 November 1951) is a Malaysian entrepreneur and former navy special forces commander. He is a retired Royal Malaysian Navy with the last rank Laksamana Pertama or Commodore. Sutarji is well known and famous for his role as godfather of PASKAL originated in 1975.

Academically, he earned his Advanced Diploma in Defence Studies from the Malaysian Armed Forces Defence College, Master of Arts in Policy & Security Studies from the National University of Malaysia & PhD in Integrated Coastal Zones Management from the University Putra Malaysia.

== Early life and military career ==
Sutarji was born in Selangor, Malaysia. His first name Sutarji clearly shows his Javanese descent from Indonesia. In January 1970, at age 19, Sutarji enlisted in the Royal Malaysian Navy as sea cadet and went through recruit training at Royal Military College in Sungai Besi, Kuala Lumpur. Sutarji attended the Cadet Officer with six others from April 1970 at Britannia Royal Naval College in Dartmouth, England in one years. For his first few years, he assumed command of the KD Sri Kedah (1972), KD Sri Perak (1973), KD Duyung (1977), KD Lembing (1979 – 1980). After became a midshipman in 1971, he attended a diving course at KD Malaya, Woodlands, Singapore from 1973. From 1974, Sutarji attended a Basic Parachuting Course at Special Warfare Training Centre in Sungai Udang, Malacca and then he attended a Basic Jungle Commando Course at Naval Training Command, Surabaya, Indonesia in 1975. In 1975, he served at the Naval Headquarters, including 3rd Grade of Staff Members and spent one years in country.

During the 1977, he attended a series of training courses in Naval Amphibious School, Coronado, including Riverine Warfare (1977), Explosive Ordnance Disposal (1979), Senior Planning Officer Amphibious (1987), Crisis Management (1993) and Defence Resources Management (2002). He has also attended the counter-terrorism special courses in the United States Navy SEALs BUD Training Centre (1977), Royal Navy Special Boat Service (1984) and Special Air Service in 1984. Sutarji was appointed Commanding Officer of PASKAL from 1984 to 1990 and 1992 to 1994. Afterwards, he spent the rest of his service as Chief Secretary-cum-Assistant Chief of Staff (Admin) in 1996 to 1998. In 1998, he served in Malaysian Armed Forces Headquarters as Director of Malaysian Armed Forces Defence Operations; as Chief Directing Staff of the Malaysian Armed Forces Defence College; and subsequently Commandant from 2003 to 2005.

In academic terms, he earned his Master of Arts in Policy and Security Studies from the National University of Malaysia in 1995 and his PhD in Integrated Coastal Zones Management from University Putra Malaysia in 2003, where he is then attached to the Department of Environmental Management, University Putra Malaysia.

His last posting was as founder of PASKAL formations and first commander of this special force in 1984. He retired from service on 30 November 2005.

== Post military life ==
After retiring, Sutarji served as a Senior Fellow at the National University of Malaysia (2005 - 2007) and associate professor at Universiti Putra Malaysia from 2007 to 2012. In UKM, he teaches the Master of Social Sciences students in the field of strategic thinkers and maritime security. In UPM and the UNITEN faculty, he teaches the students of Master of Business Administration in the field of organizational management, strategic management and attitudes in organisations. In the year 2006, he founded BIZREKA Sdn Bhd which focuses on the development of human capital as a side career. Since then, he has attended a series of entrepreneurship courses in addition invited to give lectures on various aspects of entrepreneurship including Motivation For Entrepreneurs, Application of Sun Tzu's Art of War, Strategic Management Companies and Political Analysis and Environmental Safety. Sutardji was a full-time entrepreneur in the Business Consulting.

== Personal life ==
Sutarji has two daughters and two sons. One of the sons named is Faiz Ramzi who is a civil servant.

== Honours ==
- Malaysia
  - Companion of the Order of Loyalty to the Crown of Malaysia (JSM) (2005)
  - Officer of the Order of the Defender of the Realm (KMN) (1993)
  - Herald of the Order of Loyalty to the Royal Family of Malaysia (BSD) (1980)
- Selangor
  - Companion of the Order of the Crown of Selangor (SMS) (2001)
  - Member of the Order of the Crown of Selangor (AMS) (1989)
