= Operation Dawn 8: Gulf of Aden =

Naval operation carried out by the Royal Malaysian Navy

- Part of Piracy in Somalia, Operation Ocean Shield, Operation Enduring Freedom – Horn of Africa
Date	20 January 2011
Location	300 miles southeast of the port of Muscat, Oman, near the Gulf of Aden 14.7°N 56.9°E
Result	Malaysian victory

Belligerents
Royal Malaysian Navy: PASKAL	Somali pirates

Commanders and leaders
Comm. Nazri Sharif; Lt. Cmdr Mohd Maznan Mohd Said; Lt. Noor Asri Roslan; Lt. Jason Solomon John	Ahmed Othman Jamal (surrendered); Abdil Eid Hasan (surrendered)

Strength
MT Bunga Mas Lima; 1 Super Lynx 300; 21 MISC-RMN Reserves; 14 PASKAL operators with elements from GGK and PASKAU	1 skiff boat 7~18 pirates

Casualties and losses
None	3 wounded in action/captured 4 captured
- Civilian casualties' No widely agreed-on figure.
- Approximate location of rescue operation

Operation Dawn 8: Gulf of Aden (Malay: Operasi Fajar 8) was a naval operation carried out by the Royal Malaysian Navy against pirates in the Indian Ocean on 20 January 2011. In response to the hijacking of MV Bunga Laurel, the Malaysian Shipborne Protection Team deployed an attack helicopter and 14 members of the naval counter-terrorism group PASKAL in two rigid-hulled inflatable boats to retake the vessel and rescue the crew. After one night of trailing the tanker, the Malaysian forces successfully retook the ship by force on 20 January 2011, resulting in the wounding of three and the capture of four out of 18 pirates, and all 23 vessel crewmembers rescued.

== Key Malaysian rescue personnel ==
Commander Nazri Sharif MISC-RMN
The commander of the auxiliary ship Bunga Mas Lima.

Lieutenant Commander Mohd Maznan Mohd Said RMN
The Operation Commander of Operation Dawn 9 from KD Sri Semporna. Maznan planned and commanded the PASKAL Operation Dawn to successfully rescue the hostages aboard Bunga Laurel in the Gulf of Aden.

Naval Lieutenant Noor Asri Roslan RMN
One of PASKAL's lieutenants and second-in-command as well as one of the two assault squad leaders who stormed Bunga Laurel in the Gulf of Aden.

Naval Lieutenant Jason s/o Solomon John RMN
The leader of 502 Squadron Naval Air Fleet and pilot of the Fennec attack helicopter during the operation.

Vice Admiral Ahmad Kamarulzaman Badaruddin
The Fleet Operations Commander, who directed the operation and rescue mission from the MISC Command Center in Kuala Lumpur, 7,000 nautical miles from the Gulf of Aden.

== Timeline of events ==
=== Hijacking ===
On 20 January 2011, the Panama-owned, Japanese-registered and Malaysian operated chemical tanker MV Bunga Laurel, was carrying lubricating oil and ethylene dichloride worth an estimated RM30 million ($9.8 million) sailing through to Singapore when it was attacked by a group of Somali pirates 300 nautical miles (600 km; 300 mi) southeast of the port of Muscat, Oman.

The hijacking of Bunga Laurel occurred about 300 nautical miles (560 km) (coordinate Latitude 20’ 14.73N Longitude 083’ 39.96E) east of Oman at 11:40 pm (MST), two hours after it was separated from a Navy secure escort (BM5) in the Gulf of Aden. The tanker was boarded by seven of the 18 pirates armed with AK-47 rifles and pistols who came using skiff-type boats and firing at random. During the attack, 23 Filipino crewmembers on board the vessel activated the Ship Security Alert System before taking cover in a specially designed security compartment or citadel near the vessel's engine room. Directive was given from the Fleet Operation Commander for MV Bunga Laurel to turnaround and proceed to BM5 at best speed to expedite the rescue mission. All lights were turned off and the main engines were shut down.

=== Security emergency ===
The MISC Emergency Reporting Center (ERC) was alerted by a distress signal at about 11:37 pm from the MV Bunga Laurel.

from its mounted general purpose machine gun.[7]

== Engagements ==
=== Naval action ===
On 20 January 2011, seven pirates boarded the chemical tanker MV Bunga Laurel from a skiff, while eleven remained on their mother vessel. In response, PASKAL commandos were deployed from the auxiliary vessel KA Bunga Mas Lima using two rigid-hulled inflatable boats. The Fleet Operations Commander tasked a Eurocopter Fennec helicopter stationed aboard Bunga Mas Lima to provide aerial reconnaissance and interdict pirate reinforcements. Operating under cover of darkness, suppressive fire from the helicopter's 20 mm cannon successfully prevented the mother vessel from dispatching additional hijackers.

Following a brief firefight on MV Bunga Laurel, three pirates were wounded and all seven hijackers surrendered. None of the crew members or Malaysian personnel sustained injuries.

During initial questioning, the captured hijackers disclosed that their mother vessel was a previously seized commercial ship. However, the extent of damage to the mother vessel and casualties among the remaining pirates could not be determined due to darkness during the engagement.

After the Malaysian tanker was able to proceed safely, the crew of Bunga Mas Lima recovered the remnants of the hijacker's weapons. A few AK-47 assault rifles including one modified AKM rifle and ammunition magazines were retrieved, along with Soviet-made Tokarev TT-33 semi-automatic pistols and other equipment.

== Aftermath ==
=== Prime minister ===
After news of the incident reached Malaysia, Malaysian Prime Minister Dato' Seri Najib Tun Razak congratulated the Royal Malaysian Navy on its success in rescuing the Malaysian chemical tanker, saying the government was studying international laws on how to deal with detained pirates. The Prime Minister said that the authorities would determine whether to bring the suspects under their jurisdiction or if they should take other appropriate action.

According to Maritime Institute of Malaysia senior fellow Nazery Khalid, the action by PASKAL proved Malaysia's resolve in safeguarding its maritime interests and its commitment to fighting piracy. An official with the London-based International Maritime Bureau (IMB) said, prior to any operation, the rescue team should first ensure the ship's crew was safe before boarding the vessel. On 22 January 2011, the news of this success began to spread in newspapers and international news agencies AFP and Reuters.

=== Legal proceedings ===
The Royal Malaysia Police took charge of investigations involving seven pirates who allegedly attacked Bunga Laurel in the Gulf of Aden on 20 January 2011. Inspector-General of Police Tan Sri Ismail Omar said the police were taking statements from the crew members of the vessel as well as the commandos from the navy elite PASKALs. Apparently all pirates, aged 15 to 35, had no identification documents on them. The police chief would also seek the Immigration Department's assistance.

The suspects were brought to Tengku Ampuan Rahimah Hospital in Klang for a medical examination after they arrived in Port Klang at 4:00am. They were detained at Bukit Jalil Detention Centre after the police had successfully obtained a seven-day remand order. Seven hijackers, including three minors, face a possible death sentence under Malaysian law for attempting to hijack Bunga Laurel.

They were prosecuted in the Magistrate Court on 11 February 2011, on charges of robbery with discharging their firearms at Malaysian forces with intent to cause death or seriously wound those on board Bunga Laurel. The offences were committed on board the Bunga Laurel at the co-ordinates Latitude 20 '14.73N Longitude 083' 39.96E, 250 nautical miles from the coast of Oman. Under Section 3 of the Firearms Act (Increased Penalties) 1971 (Act 37) along with Section 34 of the Penal Code, the offence carries the mandatory death penalty if convicted.

Earlier, Deputy Prosecutor Mohd Abazzafree Mohd Abbas told the court, all the accused did not speak Malay or English but the prosecution called one Somali student from Universiti Utara Malaysia (UUM), Yaser Mohamad Ahmad to translate for them.

By bringing them to the country after rescuing the vessel and booking them, Malaysia is following in the steps of the US, Germany, South Korea and the Netherlands which have charged foreign pirates who attacked their vessels in international waters.

The pirates were identified as Ahmed Othman Jamal (25), Abdil Eid Hasan (20), Koore Mohamed Abdile (18) and Abdi Hakim Mohd Abdi (18), and each were explained the charges in their native language in front of the Magistrate Siti Shakirah Mohtarudin. The names of three 15-year-old juveniles were not announced.

In September 2013, the Malaysian High Court sentenced four of the seven Somali to 4 years in prison, and the other three faced 7 years in prison.

== See also ==
- List of armed conflicts and attacks, 2011
- List of ships attacked by Somali pirates in 2011
- Combined Task Force 150 and Combined Task Force 151, coalition counter-piracy operations in the region.
- Maersk Alabama hijacking
- PASKAL The Movie, a subplot in this 2018 Malaysian film is based upon the event
- Operation Dawn of Gulf of Aden
- Piracy in the Strait of Malacca
