= Survival knife =

Knife designed for wilderness survival use

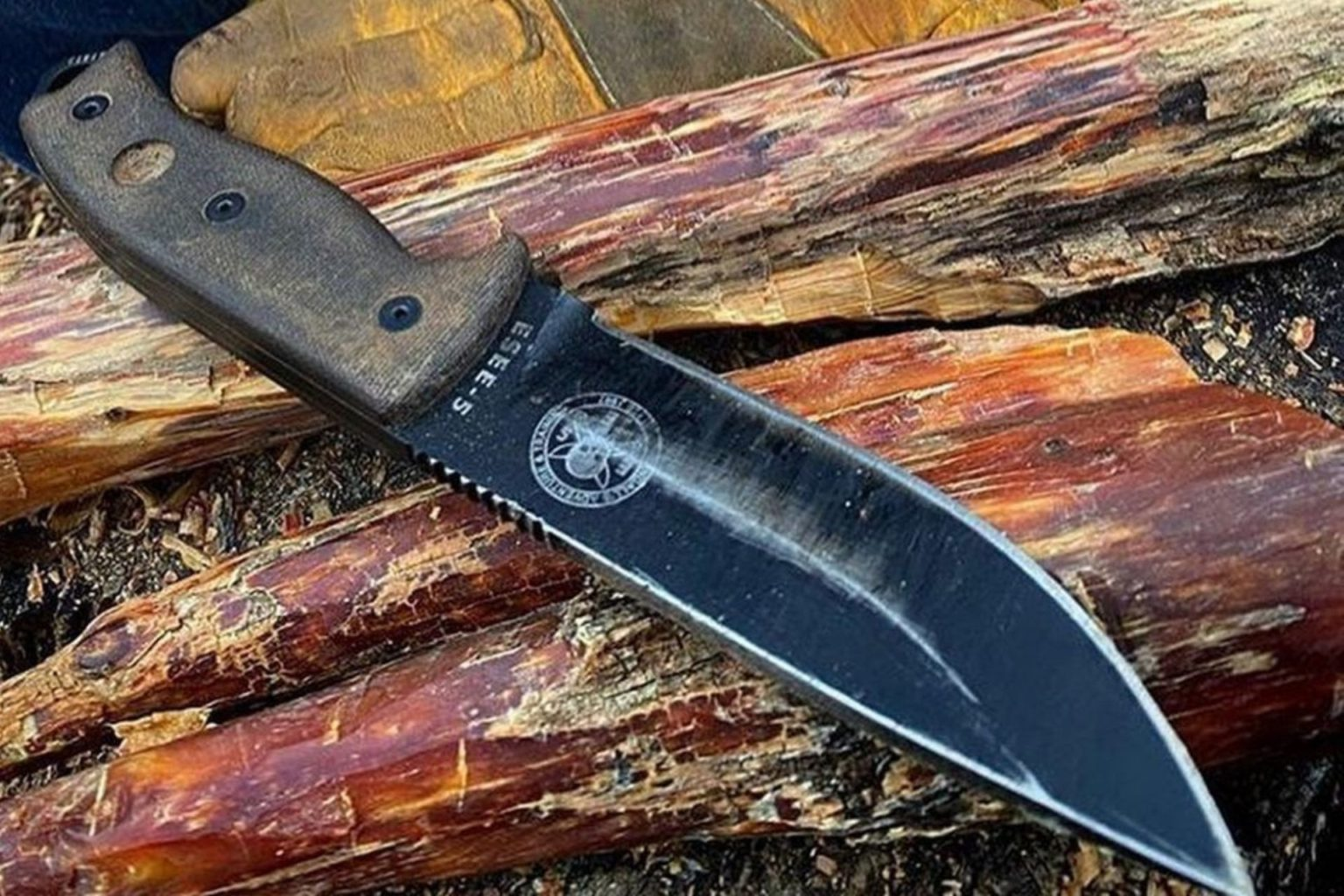
Modern typical survival knife.

Survival knives are knives intended for survival purposes in a wilderness environment, often in an emergency when the user has lost most of their main equipment.

== Origins ==
Prior to the late 19th century, outdoorsmen and military personnel did not use knives that were notably different from the knives used by butchers.

Blades were relatively thin and the handles were often no more than two wooden slabs riveted to the tang. Serrations appeared on knives in the 19th century for use as a wood saw or fish scaler.

Around the turn of the century, Webster L. Marble introduced the modern concept of the "hunting knife." These knives incorporated heavier blades, crossguards, and pommels. They very much resembled miniaturized Bowie knives.

Case, Cattaraugus, and other cutlery manufacturers soon introduced similar knives of their own and it is from these that the modern concept of the survival knife is descended. These knives, along with machetes and bolos constituted survival knives as used by military, explorers, and outdoorsmen up through at least the 1930s.

During WWII, survival knives were issued to aircraft crew, as it was a real possibility that these personnel might be shot down over wilderness or behind enemy lines. Lifeboats aboard naval vessels also frequently contained survival kits including knives.

These knives varied in design from one branch of the service to another and from one nation to another. The majority of them were simply commercial knives purchased in bulk by the military. From the Vietnam-era and to present, purpose-built survival knives evolved.

One of Randall's designs which became a popular fighting knife for troops in Vietnam was the Number 14 "Attack" Model.

During Vietnam, Randall received feedback from a Combat Surgeon in the US Army's 94th Medical Detachment named Captain George Ingraham. Ingraham's request was for serrations on the spine to cut through the fuselage of downed aircraft to rescue trapped personnel and a hollow handle to allow storage of survival gear.

Randall made the changes and the result was the first of the modern survival knives.

== Usage ==
=== Civilian ===
Survival knives can be used for trapping, skinning, wood cutting, wood carving, and other uses.

Hunters, hikers, and outdoor sport enthusiasts use survival knives. Some survival knives are heavy-bladed and thick.

Other survival knives are lightweight or fold in order to save weight and bulk as part of a larger survival kit. Their functions often include serving as a hunting knife.

=== Military ===
Most military aviation units issue some kind of survival knife to their pilots in case their aircraft are shot down behind enemy lines and the crew needs tools to facilitate their survival, escape, and rescue.

Some militaries (including Finland, Germany, the People's Republic of China, the Soviet Union, the United Kingdom, and the United States) have redesigned the bayonet used with their issued rifle to include survival knife features.

The newer models function more acceptably for mundane tasks while remaining capable of being attached to the muzzle of a rifle.

== Features ==
Survival knives are designed for work such as setting traps, cutting branches, carving wood, and skinning animals. Most survival knives have fixed blades that are 10 to 20 cm (3.9 to 7.9 in) long with a full thick tang.

Features, such as hollow handles, that could be used as storage space for matches or similar small items, began gaining popularity in the 1980s. Custom or semi-custom makers such as Americans Gil Hibben, Jimmy Lile, Bo Randall, and Chris Reeve are often credited with inventing those features.

Survival knives made by Aitor, Lile, Parrish, Randall, or Reeve have hollow handles, which allow the user to store additional equipment in the handle. Some of these knives feature a compass in the cap. A hollow handle survival knife may have reduced strength and may break more easily when performing tasks such as chopping or batoning.

On some survival knives, the spine or back of the blade is flat; allowing it to make a good hitting platform when pounding it with a hard stick to aid in splitting wood.

Other models such as Lile's and Parrish's feature a serrated spine or in the case of Rob Simonich's and Strider Knives, a band (strapping) breaker near the tip.

For survival knives that have a distinct flat spine with sharp 90 degree edges, the user can strike the spine edges against a ferrocerium rod to create sparks for fire starting purposes.

If the knife has a strong tip, then the knife can also be used as a weapon for self defense. Some knives even include holes in the handle such that the knife can be fastened to a long stick and then it functions as a spear tip. The capability to mount the knife on a stick to create a spear allows the user to better hunt wildlife at a safer distance.

The handle material of survival knives differs from one to the next and is determined primarily by user preference.

Handle materials can be hardened rubber, wood, bone (horn), aluminium, polymer, or even metal, such as stainless steel in the case of the Aitor Jungle King I, or tool steel as used in the Chris Reeve One-Piece line.

Makers like Lile, Strider, and Parrish often wrap these metal handled knives with cord which can be used in survival situations and in daily use provides a more comfortable and reliable grip.

In a situation where the knife handle breaks, if the knife is full tang, users can also wrap the handle area of the tang with cord to create a functional makeshift handle and not lose the functionality of the knife.

== See also ==
- Aircrew Survival Egress Knife
- Bushcraft
