= Jimmy Lile =

Influential custom knifemaker of the 20th century

James Buel Lile
- Born: August 22, 1933; Russellville; Pope County, Arkansas, US
- Died: May 5, 1991 (aged 57)
- Occupation(s): Knifemaker, Bladesmith
- Spouse: Marilyn Mathis
- Awards: Blade Cutlery Hall of Fame

James Buel Lile (August 22, 1933 – May 5, 1991), known as Jimmy Lile and "The Arkansas Knifesmith", was an American knifemaker from Russellville in Pope County, Arkansas, who made the Rambo Knife for the films First Blood and Rambo: First Blood Part II. As a knifemaker Lile served as a president of the Knifemakers' Guild and on the board of directors of the American Bladesmith Society.

== Early life ==
A Russellville native, Lile was the son of a coal miner. He made his first knife at the age of eleven by grinding an old file into a blade. He spent his young adult life working as a high school teacher, serving in the United States Army, and as a construction contractor.

== Knifemaker ==
In 1971, Lile became a full-time knifemaker and was known as "Gentleman Lile" or "The Arkansas Knifemaker". He was particularly known for his Survival knife designs known as "The Mission" series, created by request for Sylvester Stallone to use in his first two Rambo movies. These designs would go on to influence other knife makers in the 1980s. In addition to creating the Rambo knives, Lile designed and made several Bowie knives that he presented to Governor Bill Clinton and U.S. Presidents Ronald Reagan, Richard Nixon, and Gerald Ford. Other owners of his work included John Wayne, Peter Fonda, Fess Parker, Bo Derek, and Johnny Cash.

When Lile was approached with the specifications for the "Rambo" knife, he was told to design it not as a mere "prop" but as a basic tool to perform a variety of tasks. Lile adapted a basic clip point Bowie knife which could be used to chop wood and slice food while retaining an edge. He employed a waterproof hollow handle design to store matches, needles, thread, and a compass; the hollow-handle allows the knife to be fitted to a pole to make a spear or gig. The handle was wrapped with nylon line that could be used for fishing or making snares. The tips on the guards were made into a standard and Phillips screwdriver and the spine was serrated. Lile chose to forge the blade of 440C high-carbon steel, which he claimed could cut through the fuselage of an aircraft.

Lile was elected president of the Knifemakers Guild in 1978 and was an early member of the American Bladesmith Society. He was elected to the board of directors of the ABS in 1977 and acted as a liaison between the two groups. His "Lile Lock" folding knife is on display at the Smithsonian Institution in Washington, D.C. In 1984 he was inducted into the Blade Magazine Cutlery Hall of Fame.

On September 11, 2019, Dallas Auction Gallery sold the largest collection of original Jimmy Lile knives ever offered at auction. Over 100 Jimmy Lile Rambo movie knives were in the sale. All of the knives came from the same private collection.
