= Aitor Knife Company =

Spanish manufacturing company

Aitor is a Spanish company that specialises in manufacturing knives for consumer and military markets. According to the company, Aitor also provides equipment to the United Nations, UNESCO, the security services and armed forces of several countries.

The company was founded in 1939 in Ermua, Eibar, the Basque Country by Izaguirre brothers Máximo, Eugenio and Alejandro originally as IHER, for Izaguirre HERmanos (Izaguirre brothers), then changed the name as Cuchilleria del Norte, and finally Aitor, currently the social reason is Rehabe S.L. Their range includes combat knives for the Spanish army and several other countries armed forces, Fixed knives including high end Survival knives, are worldwide recognized for their outstanding hollow handled knives with their Jungle King I of 35.8 cm (14.10") inches total length, with a blade of 20.5 cm (8") length in stainless steel AISI 420MoV (DIN X50CrMoV15/W-Nr 1.4116) with Rockwell hardness 56/58 HRC, handle in stainless steel ISO A2 (SAE 304, 18-8) CrNi Anti magnetic. The smaller Jungle King II of 27.5 cm (10.87") of total length with Stainless steel blade in 13.5 cm (5.3") length in the same alloy that the Jungle King I, handle in Peraluman aluminum (5083-T651). Also makes pocket knives for outdoor recreation modelled on the Swiss Army knife.
